= Murder of Deborah Linsley =

1988 English murder victim

Deborah Linsley

On the afternoon of 23 March 1988, Deborah Linsley was murdered on a train between Petts Wood and London Victoria stations in Greater London. Although there were about 70 people on the train, and Linsley apparently fought and injured her attacker, only one passenger reported hearing anything suspicious. The killer has not been identified. Stored blood evidence from the scene allowed the case to be re-examined a decade later using DNA technology, and in 2002 it was re-opened with a major publicity campaign. A police reward is on offer.

== Background ==
Deborah Ann "Debbie" Linsley was born in Bromley, Kent, on 20 October 1961, to Arthur and Marguerite Linsley. Her father was a retired insurance broker, while her mother investigated fraud for the Department of Social Security. By 1988, Deborah had moved out and was living and working in Edinburgh as a hotel manager. She had returned to London to attend a hotel management course, staying at her parents' house in Bromley. She also visited her brother Gordon, at whose wedding in two weeks she would have been a bridesmaid.

On the afternoon of Wednesday 23 March, Gordon gave Deborah a lift to Petts Wood station, where she boarded the Orpington-to-London train at 14:16. The intermediate stops en route to London were Bickley, Bromley South, Shortlands, Beckenham Junction, Kent House, Penge East, Sydenham Hill, West Dulwich, Herne Hill and Brixton, with arrival at Victoria scheduled for 14:50.

The train was a 4EPB electric multiple unit number 5115 with compartment stock made up of a mixture of carriage types. Some carriages were of the fully open type with a central gangway running the full length of each carriage; others had unconnected full-width compartments seating twelve, each with a door on each side opening directly to the outside and no means of moving from compartment to compartment within the train. The trailer second carriage Linsley was in (number 15084) was of the latter type, and she may have chosen it because it was one of the few in which smoking was permitted. Following the murder, British Rail emphasised that trains always had at least some corridor-type carriages to give passengers a choice of corridor or non-corridor compartments.

== Death ==
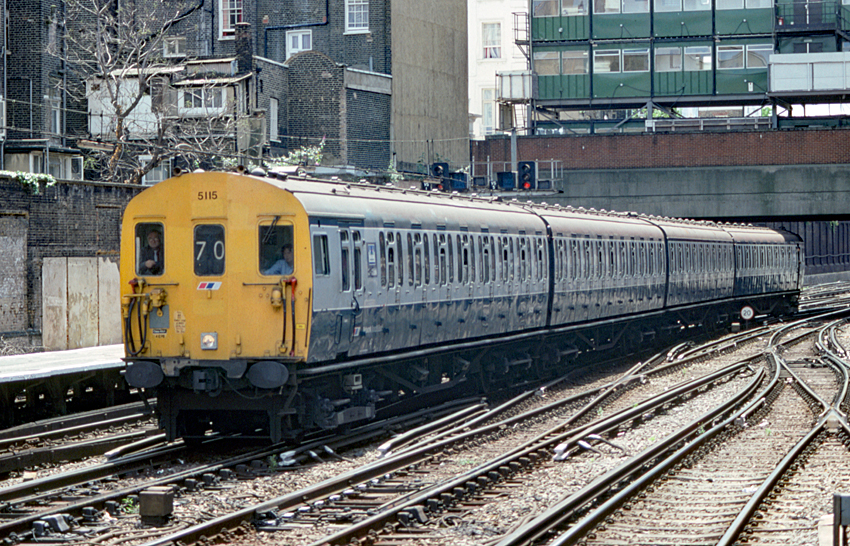
British Rail 4EPB train no. 5115, the one on which Linsley was killed on Chatham main line in 1990

At some point before the journey ended, Linsley was stabbed to death. She sustained eleven stab wounds to the face, neck and abdomen, of which at least five were to the area around the heart. One of these wounds was the cause of death. When the train arrived on Platform 2 at Victoria at 14:50, a British Rail porter (as was customary) checked the train. The carriage floor and seat were covered in blood. Some of this was discovered to be that of Linsley's killer, who had been injured in the struggle. Linsley had defence wounds on her hands, and a spokesman for Scotland Yard said that she may have been trying to defend herself from a sex attack, though police did not find any evidence of sexual interference.

Linsley's funeral took place at Holy Trinity Church, Bromley, on 22 April, and she was buried in a nearby cemetery. The cortege was accompanied by a police escort between the church and cemetery, where Deborah Linsley was buried in the bridesmaid's dress she would have worn at her brother's wedding.

British Rail had been slowly phasing out carriages of the type in which Linsley died, and within a week of the murder it announced that the number used on off-peak services – such as Linsley had been travelling on – would be reduced to minimise the chance of passengers being isolated. A broad red band was painted along the cantrail of coaches without corridors to allow passengers to identify them before boarding.

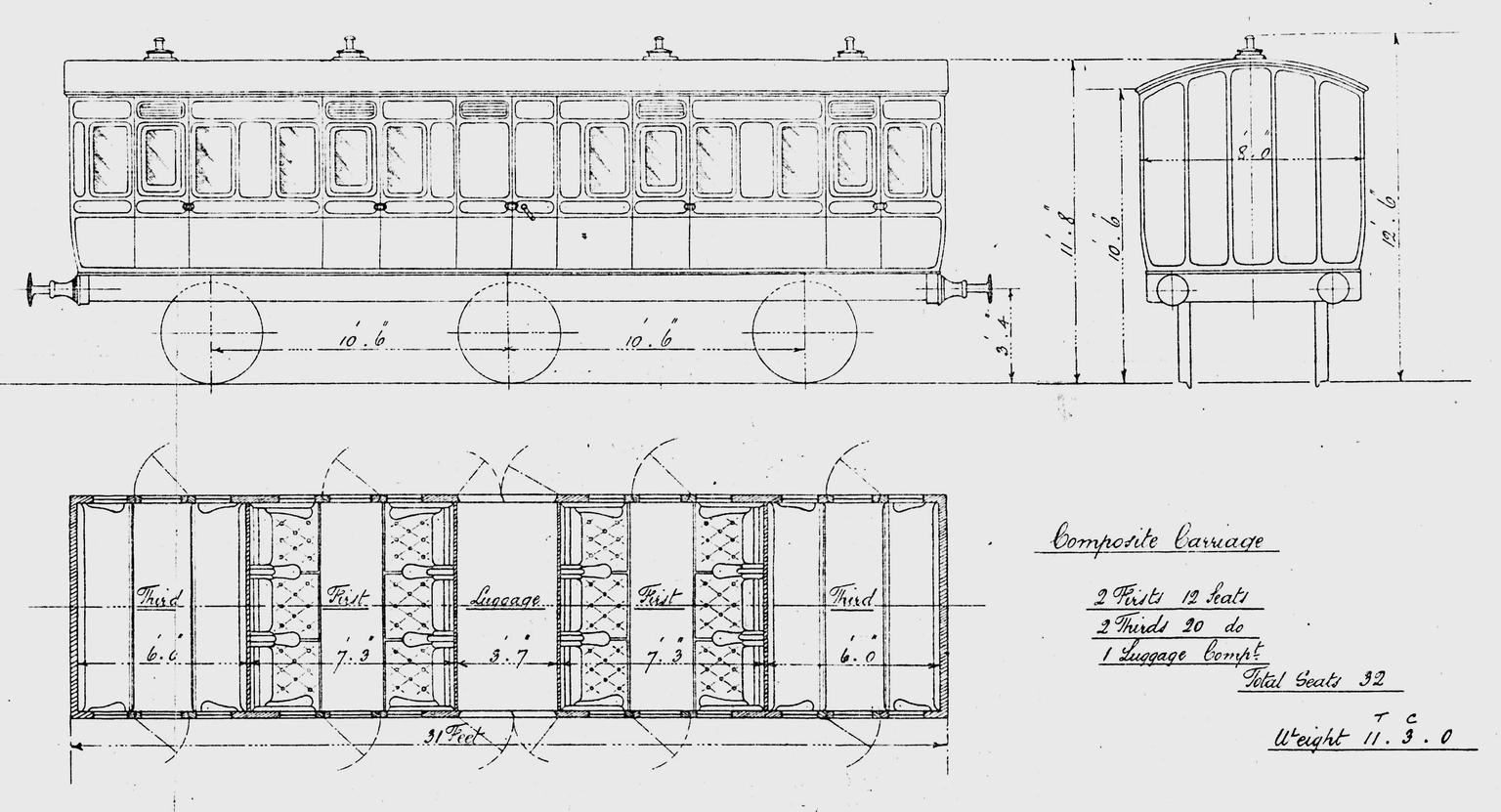
Interior layout diagram of a compartment coach with no corridor

== Investigation ==
The Metropolitan Police's senior investigating officer, Superintendent Guy Mills, described the crime as "savage and brutal". He highlighted that because the compartment Linsley was travelling in had no corridor, she had had no means of escape, "apart from through the side doors onto the track". On account of the ferocity of the attack, Mills suggested that it was unlikely to have been the killer's first. The short duration of the Brixton–Victoria journey – six minutes – suggested Linsley might have known her attacker.

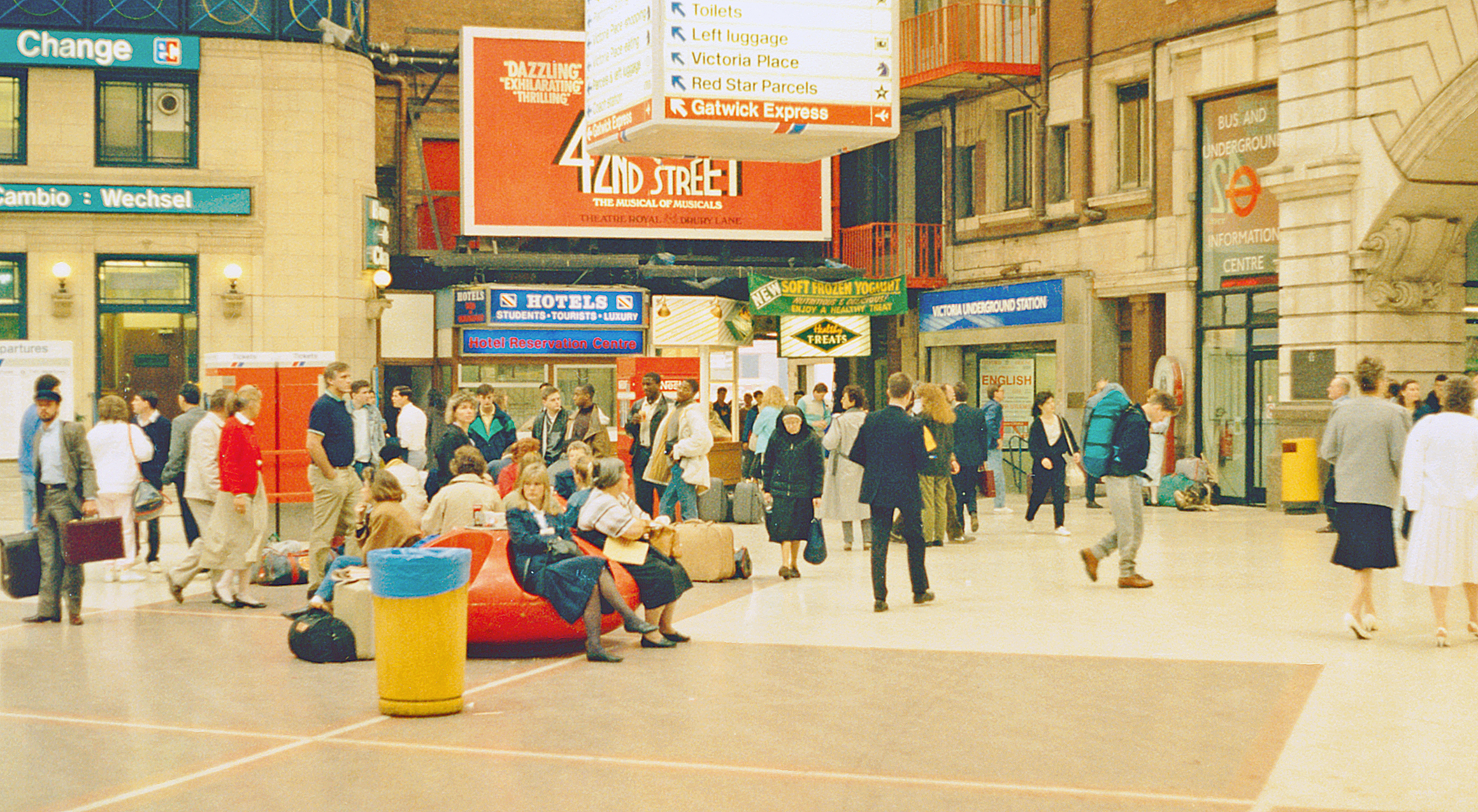
Victoria Station's concourse (May 1988) seen from around platform 2, where Linsley's train arrived

Although approximately 70 people had boarded and departed the train by the time it arrived at Victoria, the only potential witness appears to have been a French au pair who reported hearing loud screams soon after the train had departed Brixton.

Of interest to police were the following individuals:

- A passenger described as "a short, stocky man seen jumping from the train" at Victoria.
- A man seen leaving a compartment of the train at Penge East, before reboarding, possibly into Linsley's coach.
- A passenger described by police as a "scruffy man with dirty blond hair" who alighted from the train at Penge East. Police released an artist's impression of this man.
- A man seen staring at women boarding the train at Orpington.

The weapon was not found, but it is believed to have been five to seven-and-one-half inches long with a heavy blade. The 1988 police investigation produced 1200 witness statements; 650 individuals were questioned and ruled out. The case was featured on the crime reconstruction programme Crimewatch UK on 14 April 1988.

An inquest was held on 16 November 1988. The au pair who heard the attack was criticised by the Coroner for not pulling the communication cord, despite believing that someone was being raped. She said she had been "glued to her seat" and contacted police only after she learned that a murder had occurred. The coroner highlighted that, although passengers reported hearing "a commotion", nobody investigated. The inquest returned a verdict of unlawful killing.

In response to Linsley's murder, British Rail's Eastern Region ordered its guards to proactively patrol their trains and be particularly observant for women travelling alone. Likewise, the police advised that passengers should be vigilant on the railway generally, but particularly to "avoid [carriages] where the only means of escape was directly onto the line or platform".

=== Case reopened ===
Linsley's killer had sustained injuries and left blood at the scene, which was collected and stored. DNA science was in its infancy in 1988, but with advances in DNA profiling technology, the case was re-opened in 2002 and a complete DNA profile built from the sample. Linsley's case was raised on the Tonight with Trevor MacDonald programme which aired on 13 September 2002.

The new investigation case was passed to the Met's cold case investigative section, formed in 2000. An extensive publicity campaign was launched in Victoria station, and there was a peak-time television crime-scene reenactment.

In 2013 the leading officer on the case called it "puzzling" that the DNA of Linsley's killer, who was "a probable repeat violent offender" had not been matched to anyone in the DNA database. That same year, police offered a reward of £20,000 for information leading to the arrest and conviction of the killer. The new investigation also re-examined steps taken in the previous investigation, including tracing Linsley's seventy fellow passengers that day; police say they know the identities of at least fifty of them.

Deborah Linsley's parents publicly appealed several times for the assistance of the public in solving her murder. Her mother had died by 2013.

A detective has suggested more recently that not only was the attacker injured and probably bloodied but likely "behaved in a different way after the murder", which friends or relatives may have noticed at the time.

== See also ==
- Murder of Marie Wilks – 1988 stabbing murder of a woman on the emergency phone by the M50 motorway, once linked in the press to Linsley's murder
- 1988 in the United Kingdom
- Crime in London
- Murder of Laetitia Toureaux – 1937 murder in Paris, France
- John Dickman
- List of unsolved murders in the United Kingdom
- Murder of Alison Shaughnessy – another high-profile stabbing of a woman in London in 1991

UK cold cases where the offender's DNA is known:

- Murders of Eve Stratford and Lynne Weedon
- Murders of Jacqueline Ansell-Lamb and Barbara Mayo
- Murder of Lindsay Rimer
- Murder of Lyn Bryant
- Murder of Janet Brown
- Murder of Linda Cook
- Murder of Melanie Hall
- Batman rapist, subject to Britain's longest-running serial rape investigation
