= Bickley railway station =

National Rail station in London, England

Bickley
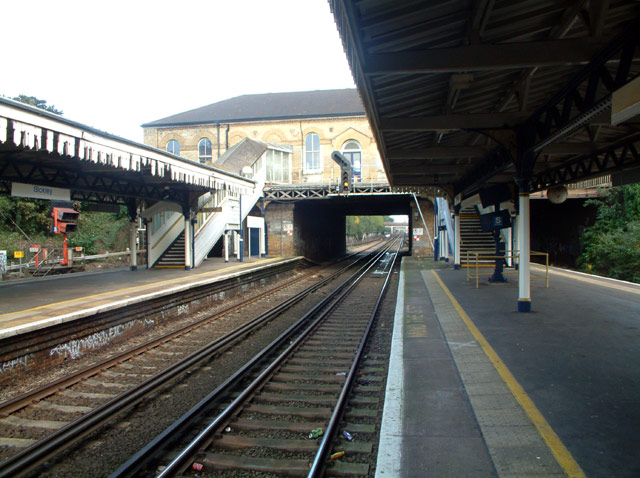
- Interactive map of Bickley

General information
- Location: Bickley
- Local authority: London Borough of Bromley
- Managed by: Southeastern
- Station code: BKL
- DfT category: D
- Number of platforms: 4
- Fare zone: 5

National Rail annual entry and exit
- 2020–21: ▼0.215 million
- Interchange: ▼1,675
- 2021–22: ▲0.478 million
- Interchange: ▲4,675
- 2022–23: ▲0.578 million
- Interchange: ▼3,410
- 2023–24: ▲0.691 million
- Interchange: ▲3,888
- 2024–25: ▲0.738 million
- Interchange: ▼3,599

Key dates
- 5 July 1858: Opened (terminus)
- 3 December 1860: Through

Other information
- External links: Departures; Facilities
- Coordinates: 51.3995°N 0.0441°E

Bickley railway station is on the Chatham Main Line, serving the town of Bickley in the London Borough of Bromley, south-east London, England; it is 11 miles 76 chains (19.2 km) down the line from London Victoria. Southeastern trains branch from the main line south of Bickley and run to Orpington via Petts Wood. Thameslink services run either via Petts Wood or St Mary Cray on the main line. Bickley is in London fare zone 5.

== History ==
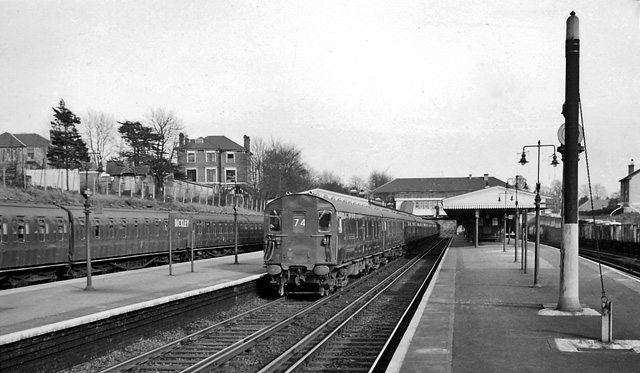
View eastwards towards Swanley, in 1961

The station was opened as Southborough Road by the London, Chatham and Dover Railway (LCDR), on the Chatham Main Line, firstly from the west (London-bound) from Bromley on 5 July 1858. On 3 December 1860, the line from the east completed the link between Victoria and Faversham; later, in 1861, in was extended to Dover and Ramsgate.

In 1860, the station was renamed Bickley.

To the east of the station are what are known as the Bickley Loops, which connect the Chatham Main Line with the South Eastern Main Line; they were formerly of the South Eastern Railway, constructed in 1902 by the newly unified South Eastern and Chatham Railway.

== Layout ==
The station lies on the four-track main line, fast and slow lines paired; crossovers allow trains to use the Bickley Loops. There are two island platforms, with stairs leading up to the station buildings at the country end of the station, located on Southborough Road.

== Services ==
Services at Bickley are operated by Southeastern and Thameslink, using Class 465, 466 and 700 electric multiple units.

The typical off-peak service in trains per hour is:

- 4 tph to London Victoria, via Herne Hill
- 2 tph to London Blackfriars, via Catford
- 4 tph to Orpington
- 2 tph to Sevenoaks, via Swanley

During peak hours, additional services between Orpington, Kentish Town and Luton call at the station. In addition, the service to London Blackfriars is extended to and from Welwyn Garden City via Finsbury Park.

From the December 2024 timetable change, the off-peak service between London Victoria and Orpington doubled to 4tph on Mondays to Fridays.

Preceding station	National Rail	Following station
Bromley South	Southeastern Bromley South Line	Petts Wood
Bromley South	Thameslink Catford Loop Line Peak Hours Only	Petts Wood
Bromley South	Thameslink Darent Valley Line	St Mary Cray

== Connections ==
London Buses routes 162, 269, 336, R7 and SL3 serve the station.
