= Chislehurst railway station =

National Rail station in London, England

Chislehurst
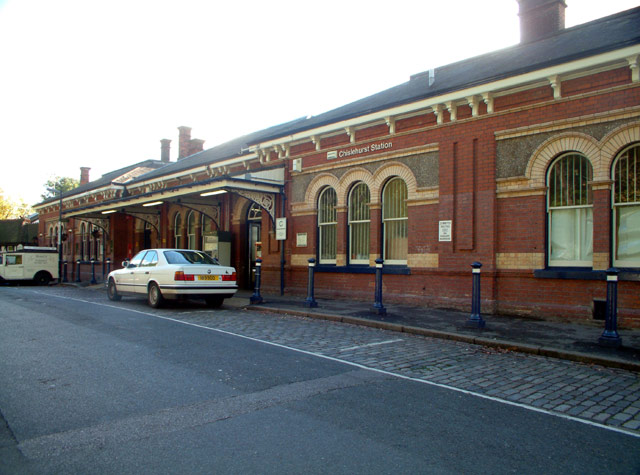
- Interactive map of Chislehurst

General information
- Location: Chislehurst
- Local authority: London Borough of Bromley
- Managed by: Southeastern
- Station code: CIT
- DfT category: D
- Number of platforms: 4
- Fare zone: 5

National Rail annual entry and exit
- 2020–21: ▼0.224 million
- 2021–22: ▲0.628 million
- 2022–23: ▲0.864 million
- 2023–24: ▲0.959 million
- 2024–25: ▲1.013 million

Key dates
- 1 July 1865: Opened
- 2 March 1868: Resited

Other information
- External links: Departures; Facilities
- Coordinates: 51.4057°N 0.0573°E

Chislehurst railway station is on the South Eastern Main Line, serving the neighbourhood of Chislehurst in the London Borough of Bromley. It is 11 miles 19 chains (18.1 km) down the line from London Charing Cross and is situated between Elmstead Woods and Petts Wood stations.

It is in London fare zone 5, and the station and all trains are operated by Southeastern.

== History ==
The station was originally named Chislehurst and Bickley Park when it was first opened on 1 July 1865: the South Eastern Railway had opened part of its cut-off line to Dover on that date. On 2 March 1868 a new station was opened south of the original on completion of the cut-off to Tonbridge. At the beginning of the 20th century the tracks through the station were quadrupled. Beyond Elmstead Woods station (opened in 1904) to the north of Chislehurst lie the Chislehurst Tunnels, a tunnel each on the slow lines 649 yards (593 m) and fast lines 591 yards (540 m).

To the south of the station the Up and Down Chatham Loop lines give access to the Chatham Main Line where the next station is St Mary Cray. There are normally no direct trains between Chislehurst and St Mary Cray, as trains that use the connecting curves usually run non-stop between London Bridge and either Rochester or West Malling.

When engineering work takes place on the South Eastern Main Line, services from London to Ashford International or Hastings call additionally at Chislehurst, using Class 375 units. These services are diverted onto the Chatham Main Line and run via Swanley and Otford.

=== Chislehurst Caves ===
The station is very close to Chislehurst Caves, former mines that were used as an air raid shelter during World War II. The close proximity of the station saw thousands of people at one point disembark at the station to enter the shelter.

== Connections ==
London Buses routes 162, 269, R7 and SL3 serve the station.

== Services ==
All services at Chislehurst are operated by Southeastern using Class 376, 465, 466 and 707 EMUs.

The typical off-peak service in trains per hour is:

- 2 tph to London Charing Cross (non-stop from Lewisham to London Bridge)
- 2 tph to London Cannon Street (all stations except Lewisham)
- 4 tph to Orpington of which 2 continue to Sevenoaks

On Sundays, the station is served by a half-hourly service between Sevenoaks and London Charing Cross via Lewisham.

Preceding station	National Rail	Following station
Elmstead Woods	Southeastern Grove Park Line	Petts Wood
