= Murder of Marie Wilks =

1988 English murder victim

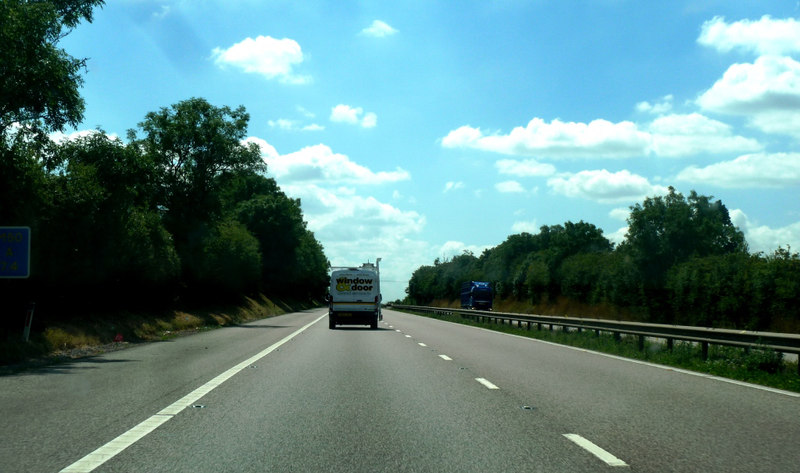
- The M50 in 2016. The emergency telephone, where Wilks was attacked and abducted, was by the trees on the right-hand side of the image, near the blue lorry.
- Date: 18 June 1988
- Time: Approx. 7:40 pm
- Location: Emergency telephone 2076B, M50 motorway, near Longdon, Worcestershire

Marie Wilks
- Wilks, c. 1988
- Born: 30 March 1966
- Disappeared: 18 June 1988; Emergency telephone 2706B, hard shoulder of the M50 motorway52.017643°N 2.226348°W
- Status: Found murdered on 20 June 1988
- Died: 18 June 1988 (aged 22)
- Cause of death: Stab wounds to the neck
- Body discovered: Embankment on the side of the eastbound carriageway of the M50 motorway, slightly east of Junction 1 52.036436°N 2.160195°W
- Known for: Abduction from the side of a busy motorway within sight of traffic and subsequent murder

Marie Patricia Wilks (30 March 1966 – 18 June 1988) was a 22-year-old seven-months-pregnant woman who was abducted from the hard shoulder of the M50 motorway and murdered in June 1988. Her body was found two days later dumped three miles up the road, after a witness described having seen a silver-grey Renault 25 car parked there. In 1989, Eddie Browning was convicted of the murder by unanimous jury decision. Browning, who had previous convictions for assault and was recently released for aggravated burglary, had stormed out of his home that day after a violent row with his seven-months-pregnant wife. Dozens of witnesses reported seeing a blond man in a silver-grey C-registered Renault 25 parking by Wilks and both the descriptions of the man and the car matched Browning and his vehicle. He was the only driver of C-registered silver-grey Renault 25s nationwide who could not be eliminated as a suspect, indicating that only he could be responsible. A tyre expert also testified at trial that a skid mark matched a wheel on Browning's car.

Having failed in an initial appeal in which he argued the judge should have allowed a conviction of manslaughter and not murder, Browning was controversially freed in 1994 on a technicality. A police officer who had felt guilty at having apparently driven past the killer's vehicle had undergone hypnosis to try to remember more of the numberplate, but the video of this had not been disclosed to the defence (or prosecution). It was determined that this was an "irregularity" as he had given a numberplate different from Browning's, even though he still maintained it was a C-registered vehicle. The prosecution maintained the video had only not been disclosed as the man had unintentionally made up the evidence in an effort to be helpful, highlighting how he had immediately apologised and told police to ignore it. However, the judges ruled they could not be certain the jury would still have convicted Browning and so ordered his release, although did not declare him innocent.

Browning was given compensation, as were all individuals freed on appeal at this point regardless of confirmation of innocence. Browning was subsequently convicted twice of carrying a knife in public (the same believed used in the murder) and also for drunk driving and attempting to evade arrest, whilst also being arrested for allegedly attacking his wife with a chainsaw and for causing a car accident. In 2000, one of those who had called police saying he matched the artist's impression in the Wilks case testified on oath at a trial that Browning had admitted to murdering the woman the day before he was arrested. Re-investigations of the case failed to identify any suspects other than Browning. He died in 2018 aged 63; police said there were no suspicious circumstances.

== Background ==
Marie Wilks was pregnant and heading home to Worcester after visiting her husband Adrian at a Territorial Army camp. She was driving accompanied by her 11-year-old sister, Georgina Gough, and her 13-month-old son Mark. She was attacked while calling for assistance after her car had broken down, and her body was later found on the side of the M50 motorway.

== Search and discovery ==
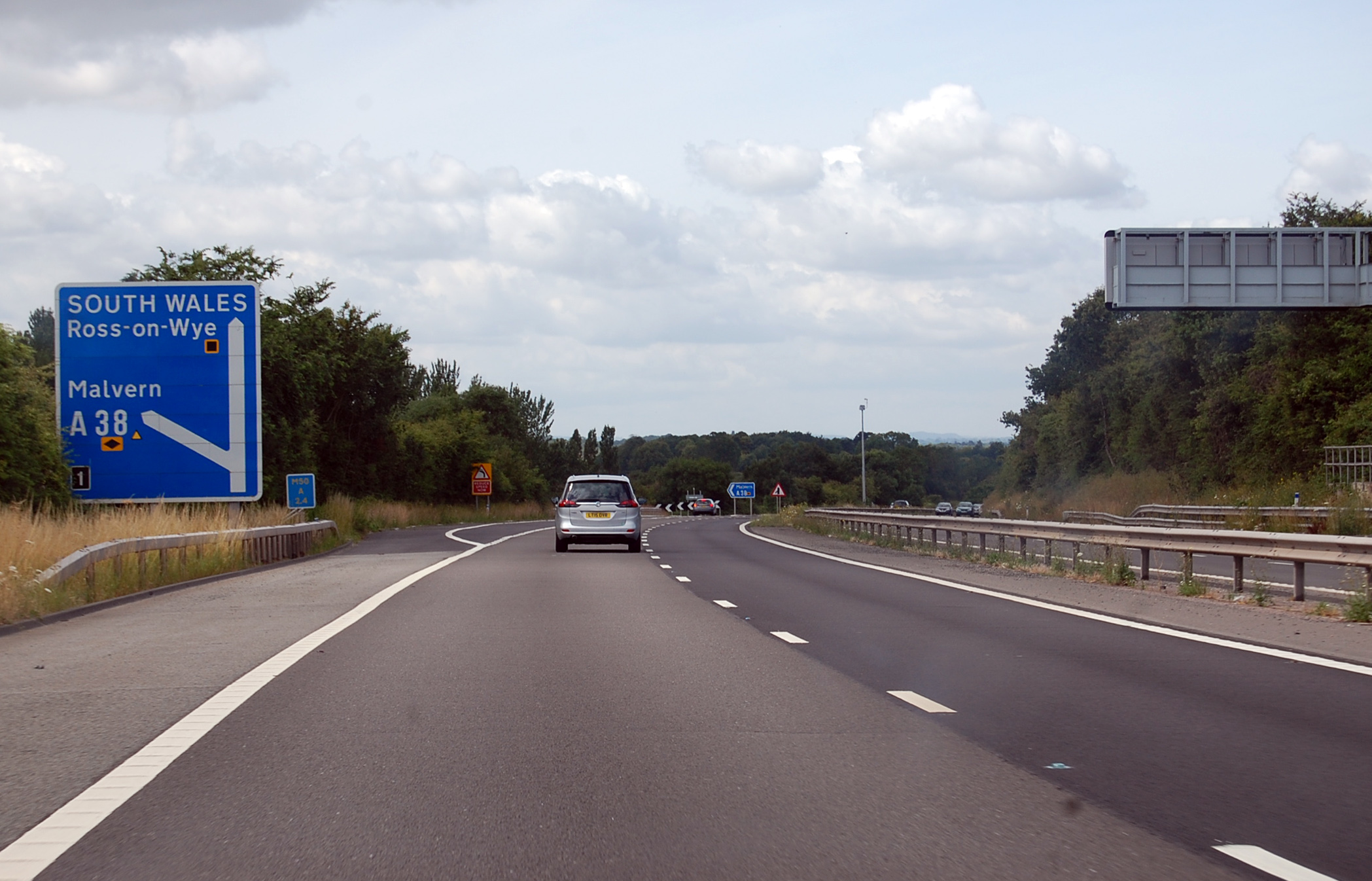
Wilks was found dead beside the eastbound carriageway on the right of this image (this picture is taken from the westbound carriageway approaching Junction 1). Several witnesses reported seeing a Renault 25 parked inside the crash barrier on the edge of the road, and when police went to the spot they found Wilks' body.

By 8.10 pm, a police helicopter had been scrambled to search with heat-seeking imagery; however, it was unsuccessful due to the hot June weather. At 8.20pm, tracker dogs began to aid the large police search. At dawn, the following day, some blood was discovered around the emergency phone area. A witness came forward to report seeing a silver Renault 25 parked three miles further up the road in a reversed position behind the crash barrier at the side of the road, and when this witness led police to the spot on 20 June, the body of Wilks was discovered at the bottom of the embankment, near the Bushley area in Hereford and Worcester. Wilks had been stabbed in the side of her neck, severing her carotid artery, and struck on the side of the head. It was later disclosed that Wilks had tried to use her Red Cross training to stem the blood from her punctured artery with her hand, which had successfully helped reduce her blood loss and might have saved her, before the killer had punched her three or four times in the face and broken her jaw, knocking her out and finally killing her. The attack, murder and dumping of Wilks' body would only have taken about 10 minutes in total.

Further evidence was found at the site that a car had been reversed behind the crash barrier.

== Investigation and arrest ==
West Mercia Constabulary set up interview areas in nearby service stations and also detained motorists in their search for witnesses. On 24 June, an artist's impression of a possible suspect was released, with further witness descriptions of a blond man seen at the crime scene. He was described as "of young appearances, in his 20s", blond crew cut hair, with possible yellow or orange highlights. He had pale skin and a long sharp nose. This man had been seen driving his silver-grey car onto the hard shoulder next to Wilks's car, and a similarly described man had been seen by witnesses near Wilks at the emergency telephone. Several witnesses corroborated the sighting.

Experts attempted to examine an automatic tape machine by the site of the phone box, believing that it may have recorded the attack. On 25 June, a reconstruction was filmed on the M50, with WPC Taryn Green dressed in a pink and white maternity dress similar to the one Marie had worn. On 28 June, following an identity parade, Edward Owen Browning was charged with the abduction and murder of Marie Wilks.

== Evidence against Eddie Browning ==
The artist's impression of the suspect in the Wilks' case, compared to Eddie Browning. Browning was later found to have been wearing a blue and white striped shirt on the day of the murder, as the suspect was described and depicted in the artist's impression.

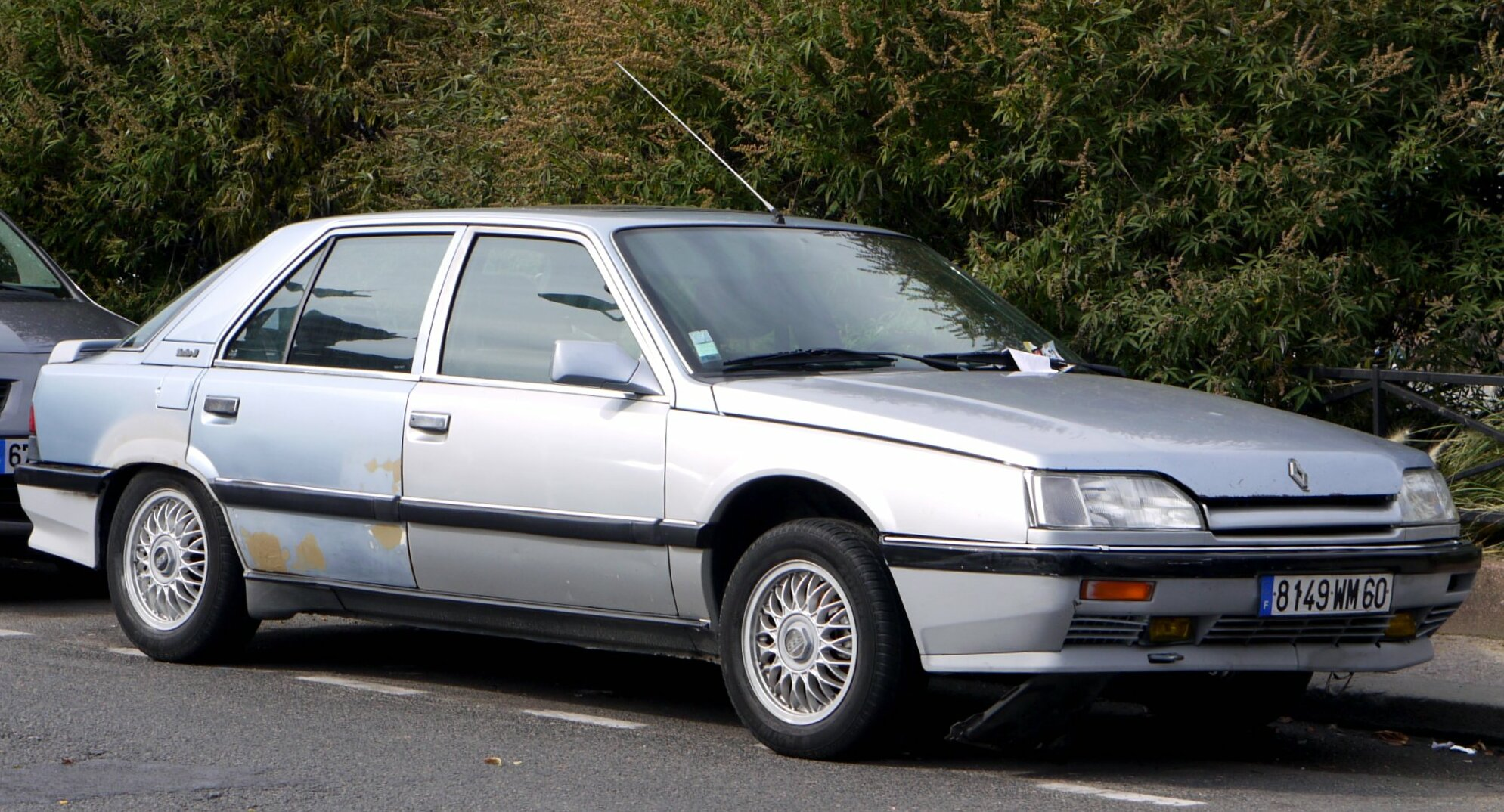
Several witnesses saw a silver-grey Renault 25 both at the murder scene and parked where the body was found. Browning was driving a silver-grey Renault 25 that day.

"Eddie" Browning was a former Welsh Guardsman who had been rejected by the SAS and who worked as a night club bouncer in a South Wales social club. He lived in Cwmparc, in the Rhondda Valley area of South Wales, and was said to live off his 'hard man' reputation as a bouncer. He was married, and expecting a baby with his wife, Julie, although he was also cheating on her at the time. This was his second marriage, with his first marriage notably having broken up because of Browning's violence. He had a reputation for mindless, random violence and had a criminal record, including two convictions for assault. He had only recently been released from prison in 1986, having served a seven-year sentence for aggravated burglary. At the time, police had found a revolver, which he used to threaten victims, buried in his garden. He had also once chased two policemen with a samurai sword. He was considerably stressed at the time of the murder because he had recently developed the life-changing condition diabetes.

Police had become interested in Browning after several calls identifying him from the artist's impression, which bore a remarkable likeness to him. One of the 14 calls identifying Browning had come from Browning's own close friend and fellow night club bouncer Kenneth Latten, who said he matched the description and also reported that he became edgy and unstable as soon as the artist's impression came on TV while they were at a club together. On the day of the murder he left his house to drive to Scotland after a violent row with his wife, who, like Wilks, was seven months pregnant at the time. The row had begun after Browning insisted his wife make breakfast for him, which she did not want to do as she had just returned from work. For some hours he went out to several clubs and pubs and drank a considerable amount, and witnesses recounted him being in a foul and reckless mood. Browning then came home, only to soon storm out again after his wife became angered at him ignoring her and a violent argument ensued about his womanizing; he had indeed been cheating with a mistress at the time. His first wife would later tell the press that Browning was a violent and unfaithful man who cheated on her constantly, even on the day before their wedding, and also used to hit her when she complained, including when she was pregnant. It later materialised that Browning's second wife had herself been cheating behind her husband's back at the time of the murder; it is not known whether Browning knew about this, but the man with whom the wife was having an affair told the press that Browning "would kill us if he found out" since he was "a maniac and would gladly kill any man who went with his wife". It was said that Browning had on multiple occasions assaulted local men he thought had been having affairs with his wife.

Browning declared that he was going to drive away to a friend's house in Scotland after the second row, with his wife not knowing how long he would be away. After the murder, it was revealed, Browning had called his mistress to tell her about the violent row with his wife, saying: "Bev, I had to go then because if I had stayed I would have killed her". It was later argued that this showed he had "murder on his mind". When Browning's wife heard that he had been arrested for the murder she reportedly collapsed. Three "vital" calls were received by police from an anonymous man in Scotland; it was not known if this evidence was related to the friend in Scotland Browning drove to see on the day of the murder.

It was believed that Browning had seen the vulnerable Wilks at the side of the motorway on his journey and, still filled with rage, had stopped to attack her. When he had seen that she was heavily pregnant, it may have reminded him of the tempestuous relationship he had with his own heavily pregnant wife and reignited his anger which led to him stabbing her. The amount he had drunk likely would have also worsened his state of mind.

Witnesses had seen a silver Renault 25 car parked at the spot where the body was later found dumped, and dozens of witnesses had come forward to report seeing this silver-grey C-registered Renault driving erratically on the stretch of the motorway near the murder site, with the blond-haired driver speeding at speeds of up to 120 miles per hour. Browning had been driving a C-registered silver-grey Renault 25 that day. An off-duty police officer had seen Browning park his silver-grey car by Wilks as she was on the emergency telephone, but assumed that he was offering to help her and so drove on. Several witnesses corroborated this account, reporting that they had seen the silver Renault perform a U-turn across the central reservation before parking up next to Wilks. One woman reported seeing the man getting out and touching Wilks. All these witnesses reported the man who had parked near Wilks and got out to speak to her as being blond. Another officer also saw Browning's car parked by the embankment where Wilks was dumped, but did not know at that early stage that it was connected to Wilks' murder. Crucially, a motorist had also identified the first two letters of the car's numberplate, which matched Browning's numberplate. Police were able to eliminate all the 479 other drivers of silver/grey Renault cars in the country with the same first two letters on their numberplates, meaning Browning was further incriminated by a process of elimination and indicating only he could have been responsible. The only driver of such a vehicle across the country whose movements could not be accounted for on the day of the murder was Browning. Police later said that even if his name had not been given to the police by tip-offs they would have eventually interviewed Browning anyway because of these descriptions of the type of Renault car which Browning was driving and the numberplate, with his car one of the 480 in the country that matched the descriptions.

It was known by witnesses that Browning owned a butterfly knife whose blade matched the one used in the murder, and which he carried with him. Several people had seen him practicing opening it. He was a martial arts enthusiast and had boasted about his speed with a knife.

== Trial ==
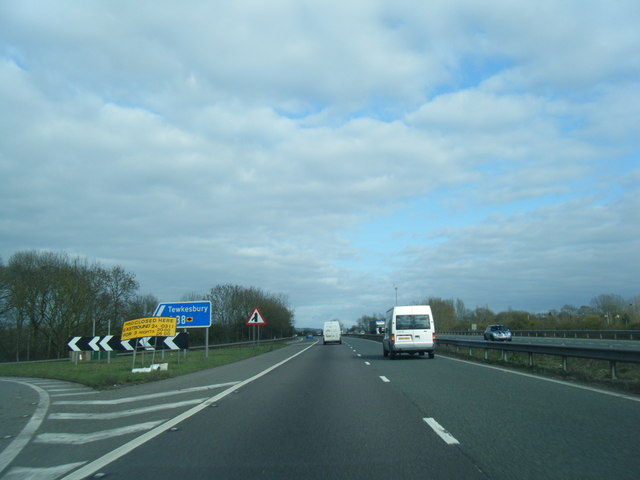
Wilks was dumped beside the road a few hundred yards (metres) up the road from this spot, near Junction 1 of the M50.

The trial of Eddie Browning took place at Shrewsbury Crown Court, beginning on 3 October 1989, and ending on 10 November 1989. The evidence was presented by Mr Anthony Palmer, QC for the prosecution. A notable moment in the trial was when Browning openly admitted that, in his duties as a bouncer, he could punch someone hard enough to break their jaw. Wilks had been found with a broken jaw when she was discovered murdered. Some years previously, Browning had broken a police officer's jaw at a South Wales police station but had been cleared by a court after claiming self-defence. The jury were not told this information, nor did they know about Browning's prior convictions for assault or aggravated burglary, since laws at the time prevented prior criminal convictions being disclosed in court. With his wife and mistress in court attending, Browning admitted he could be "insensitive" to women, but denied that he could be "callous". By the time of the trial Browning's pregnant wife had given birth to a baby daughter whom he then met in prison, which had delighted him. Both of the psychologists appointed by the court to inspect Browning agreed that there might have been a serious disturbance in Browning's past which had left him with his unstable personality. However, both concluded that he had killed out of anger.

Mr John Griffiths Williams QC, for the defence, argued that Browning had not been on the M50 on 18 June 1989. Browning himself said that he had crossed the Severn Bridge on his journey to Scotland and had not travelled on the M50 that day. However, Mr Palmer of the prosecution pointed out that security cameras on the Severn Bridge did not pick up Browning's car that day, indicating that Browning's story was a lie. Browning's own father also testified against his son for the prosecution and said that Eddie had called in to ask him the best route to Scotland from south Wales that day, and he told him to go via the M50, before Browning promptly left and started his journey. Browning was found to have a written route which included the M50, and the trial judge asked the jury to consider why Browning had therefore dubiously claimed he had not used the M50, when he was accused of a murder on the M50. The prosecution pointed out that Browning had claimed he had got rid of his butterfly knife three weeks before the murder, yet witnesses had reported him showing them it two days before the murder, indicating he was lying and still had it at the time of the killing.

Defence QC Williams said that Browning had only "acted impulsively" said there was nothing to suggest any sexual motive. The defence argued that Browning only bore a superficial resemblance to the artist's impression, especially in regards to hair cut and age. However, the tyre expert revealed at the trial that the skid mark made near the spot Wilks' body was found was made by Browning's Renault 25 car, saying that he was certain it came from his front nearside wheel. The front nearside wheel on Browning's car had a braking fault that matched the peculiar mark one of the skid marks had left, and also was heavily worn and without tread just like the mark. Browning's friend also testified that there was a thick smudge of blood on the car when he arrived in Scotland, with Browning saying it must have come from "an animal he had hit on the journey" before cleaning it off. The friend, however, saw that the blood was thick and not like thin animal blood. Browning then asked the friend for a bucket of water and cloth to clean it off before asking if he could then keep the cloth, the friend testified. The friend's housemate also corroborated this story, and both said that Browning had arrived wearing a blue and white striped shirt, two of seven witnesses who said so. Browning's friend also said that he was wearing blue jeans. These were exactly the type of clothes witnesses had described the suspect at the scene of the murder as wearing, as depicted in the artist's impression.

Browning's own brother also testified that Browning said had spoken of burning his Renault 25 car for an insurance claim. Forensic experts had in fact found a smear of human blood in Browning's car, but it was too small a sample to tell the blood group (forensic science at that time could only tell what blood group a bloodstain was, not whose blood it was). It was believed that Browning had used his knowledge from his prior criminal experiences to hide more evidence.

The jury did not believe Eddie Browning's version of events and they found him unanimously guilty of murder after five and a half hours' deliberation. He was sentenced to life in prison to serve a minimum of 25 years. In his sentencing remarks, the trial judge said Browning had shown himself to be "vain and arrogant" in the dock and said he "wholeheartedly" agreed with the verdict of the jury. He told Browning:

On June 18, 1988, you had plainly had a fierce disagreement with your wife, arising in part out of your selfish demand that she, heavily pregnant, should get your breakfast. Following that, you spent six hours in pubs and clubs in the Upper Rhondda and on your return ignored your wife, which led to a violent disagreement. You set out for Scotland, without your wife knowing how long you would be away. You saw the solitary figure of a pregnant woman on the motorway. Whether out of spite or rage or any other reason, you determined to wreak violence on that person. It is plain you intended to take it out on her because she was defenceless and because she was pregnant.

There were cheers and applause from the public gallery when the guilty verdict was announced, and Wilks' sobbing husband Adrian rushed to thank Anthony Palmer of the prosecution. After the trial, he stated: "I never had any doubts that Browning killed Marie". Wilks' father also broke down after the verdict, exclaiming "brilliant". Browning showed no reaction when found guilty, staring straight ahead.

After the trial, the friend whom Browning had travelled to see on the day of the murder said he believed Browning had indeed killed Wilks, saying: "My feeling is that Eddie just snapped. In his mind's eye he was killing his own pregnant wife. She is lucky to be alive". Browning's first wife also commented: "It doesn't surprise me Eddie could kill a pregnant woman. Sometimes I thought he would murder me. It didn't matter to Eddie who he hit, policemen, women, anybody. If he got in a rage you couldn't stop him". She added: "He beat me and then denied it. Eddie was the sort of man who would lie about everything. No wonder he insisted he was innocent at the trial – he doesn't know what the truth is".

== Praise for investigation ==
The judge praised the prosecution and its preparation, and commended Detective Chief Superintendent David Cole, who led the investigation. He said that the detectives who worked on the case deserved "the highest commendations".

== Appeals ==
Browning lost an appeal against his conviction in 1991. He had complained about the nature of the evidence against him, but the Court of Appeal stated that the evidence had been properly admitted as the jury had been correctly directed on it. He had also complained that the judge had prevented the jury from coming to a manslaughter verdict against him (i.e. that he had indeed killed her but accidentally), but this was rejected. He said that the evidence about him appearing similar to the E-fit was faulty, but the trial judge pointed out that the prosecution's case was only that the witness sightings were not inconsistent with Browning's appearance, and never claimed they were identical. When the judges rejected the appeal and ordered Browning to be taken down, Browning shouted out "I have done nothing to be ashamed of". Wilks' family spoke of their relief at the decision to reject Browning's appeal.

Eddie Browning's new QC, Michael Mansfield, launched a new appeal in 1994. He introduced new evidence to the court, that West Mercia Constabulary has withheld witness evidence and statements. In particular, the evidence obtained under hypnosis of off-duty police Inspector Peter Clarke. He had seen a grey/silver car pulling over onto the hard shoulder at the crime scene. During his hypnotic state, Inspector Clarke gave the car registration number as C856HFK; Browning's car registration was C754VAD. There were other differences in make of car and type of hubcaps. Another witness was "encouraged", according to Mr Mansfield, to say that he had seen a C reg car when in actuality, he could not be sure. However, while the hypnosis video had not been disclosed to the defence, it had also not been disclosed to the prosecution. Additionally, Mr Clarke insisted that the registration number he mentioned during hypnosis was not certain and told police at the time that they "shouldn't spend too much time on it". The police insisted that Clarke had unintentionally made up the evidence "in an effort to be helpful". Clarke had been criticised for having driven on despite having seen a man, presumably the killer, having turned and stopped by Wilks while she was at the emergency phone, with Clarke notably saying that "I have to live with that on my conscience, that a young woman and her child lost their lives because I made a fatal error of judgement". After making the video in an attempt to make up for this error and the fact he had been unable to remember the numberplate other than it starting with a C, Clarke was extremely apologetic and wished for the details from the hypnosis session to be dismissed, saying he could only be sure of the details in his original statement. He insisted that the only thing he could remember for sure was that the car's numberplate started with a C – as Browning's indeed did.

Defending the conviction at the appeal, the prosecution said that the video had not been handed to any of the lawyers because it was considered unreliable, that it was a marginal part of the inquiry, and because the "sham" hypnosis video had in any case been made without the authorisation of the lead detective. The detectives who managed the investigation had already been cleared of misconduct in not disclosing the video tape. The Crown argued that, although the video should have been disclosed, it would not have been of any value anyway, as Clarke had been in a "hyper-suggestive" state and the overly-keen-to-help man was clearly being coaxed by the hypnotist in the video. The court also heard that even without the evidence of Clarke, there remained enough evidence to convict Browning, and that it was an "entirely safe conviction". Dozens of other witnesses had also reported seeing a blond man who looked similar to Browning driving this same car, and one had been able to identify the first two letters of the numberplate being "C7", which matched Browning's numberplate of C754VAD. Browning's car was still the only C7-registered Renault 25 car out of the nearly 500 known to be in the country that could have been in the vicinity of the murder that day. Clarke had continued to maintain that the car was a C-registered vehicle with C as the first letter on the numberplate, which partly corroborated the other witness's sighting of the numberplate starting C7.

Lord Chief Justice Taylor gave opinion that if the hypnosis evidence had been included in the original trial, he could not be certain that the verdict would have remained the same. The appeal was therefore narrowly granted and, in May 1994, Browning was freed, although he was not declared innocent. The judges also did not find that there was any bad faith in relation to any officer of the West Mercia Constabulary. West Mercia Constabulary said they were "surprised and disappointed" by the Court of Appeal's decision, and added that there were no new lines of inquiry which pointed to anyone other than Browning having committed the crime. Wilks's widower remarked that he was "totally gutted" by the decision and said it was "the second worst day of my life".

Browning advised the Wilks family to go back to West Mercia Constabulary, although he also stated that "over the years I have lost any sympathy for the Wilks family." He also acknowledged that he had not managed to prove that he was an innocent man. He was subsequently awarded £600,000 in damages, which Wilks's widower, Adrian, said made him "shocked and distressed". At that time, every individual who requested compensation after being acquitted on appeal would, automatically, be given compensation even if, as in Browning's case, there was no evidence proving their innocence; this law was only changed in 2006, when it was ruled that compensation would only be given "if and only if the new or newly discovered fact shows beyond reasonable doubt that the person did not commit the offence". Around this time, there began to be complaints in the press that people such as Browning had been awarded compensation, yet people who were apparently more likely to be innocent of the crimes they had been convicted of such as Angela Cannings had yet to be given any. Worcester MP Mike Foster said he could not comment on Mr Browning's acquittal, that he did not know if he had been rightly acquitted or not, but said his sympathies were with Mrs Wilks's family. Detective Chief Superintendent David Coles, head of CID, later said, "All I would say is that I was completely satisfied with the investigation".

Upon his release, Browning moved back to Cwmparc, in Wales, where locals there gave him a less-than-warm reception, as many remained convinced he was guilty, with one commenting to the press: "There's a lot of people won't be rejoicing". Even prior to the murder, he had a long-standing reputation in the village for being quick with his fists. Due to the strength of feeling in the village, only a small celebratory reception was held by close friends when Browning returned home. Soon after he was released, Browning moved from Cwmparc to Ceredigion. Within only seven months of his release, Browning's wife, Julie, filed for divorce from him because of the "living hell" of living with him. He also quickly spent all of his initial compensation money on luxury items and nights out drinking, saying that his release "hasn't made me any happier". He later married for a third time to Merediel Tomson.

== Aftermath ==
Police reinvestigations of the Wilks murder have not uncovered any suspects other than Browning and police continue to believe Browning was responsible. In 1995, only one year after he was freed, Browning was arrested in a pub for possessing a knife in public. Thirteen other people in the pub were arrested simultaneously for drug offences, and drugs such as heroin and cocaine were found. Browning refused to accept that any drugs were found. The knife was a butterfly knife, similar to the one used in the Wilks's murder, and he was convicted at court for possessing it and fined £150. Afterwards Browning attempted to approach national newspapers to try and sell his story.

In 1996, Browning made the news again after police issued a request for the public to help locate him so they could arrest him for allegedly threatening his estranged wife. The wife had dialled 999 from their home and the emergency operators reportedly heard the sound of him attacking her with a chainsaw in the background.

In 2000, Kenny Latten, the friend of Browning and fellow bouncer who had been one of those who had reported Browning matching the E-fit in the initial investigation, attacked Browning in his home in Rhondda. At his subsequent trial for the attack, Latten testified, on oath, that Browning had admitted to killing Wilks the day before he was originally arrested and he said this to Browning during their fight. Latten also said that he then told Browning's wife of his confession. Despite this new evidence Browning could not be retried for the murder due to the double jeopardy laws in place at the time. A jury only took less than an hour to clear Latten of wounding Browning.

In 2002, Browning was arrested again and charged with failing to stop after a car accident. He was also charged with failing to report the accident.

In 2005, Browning was banned from driving for 28 months after being caught driving three times over the legal alcohol limit. He initially claimed that he had only consumed alcohol due to 'his drink being spiked'. His brown Land Rover had been spotted driving erratically from one side of the road to the other, and when police attempted to pull him over he refused to stop. He was only stopped when another police officer used his car to block a junction and stop him from going any further. When he was finally stopped, he was found to be carrying a lock knife in his pocket. He was told at court that he was lucky to avoid prison for the offence.

In 2008, the original pathologist in the investigation said that advances in forensic science could feasibly help solved Wilks's murder. David Cole, the lead detective on the original case, who had always believed Browning was responsible, said of the possible forensic opportunities: "I would be very interested if West Mercia was to re-open the case and submit certain items of evidence to renewed examination."

In 2016, Detective Chief Inspector Steve Tonks, with his team, reopened the case to see if any new forensic evidence could be generated to solve the murder. No such evidence was found, and the case remains, officially, unsolved.

In 2018, while police were conducting a reinvestigation of the murder, Browning died aged 63. He was found dead in his home in Lampeter, Wales. Police said that it was a sudden death and that there were no suspicious circumstances.

The murder of Marie Wilks produced outrage at the death of a young mother; fear in lone female motorists; embarrassment and frustration for West Mercia Constabulary, whose tactics and procedures were found to be deficient; and brought attention to crimes against pregnant women.

== Issues raised by the murder ==
=== Safety ===
The fate of Marie Wilks was still being discussed in relation to driver safety years later. Other similar incidents, involving serious attacks on lone female drivers who had broken down, and the continued fears of women revealed in surveys that showed that eight out of ten women felt "some degree" of anxiety in driving alone. In 1988, the only safety option opened to motorists was the emergency phone. There was conflicting advice given to women who broke down. These women, on being interviewed, described being abandoned by police or even being fined for helping other stranded women. In 2021, police are still advising the use of the emergency phone while also recommending to get into your car if another person approaches you and you feel in danger.

=== Violence against pregnant women ===
A part of the circumstantial evidence against Eddie Browning was the fact of his angry row with his pregnant wife. There is some literature to evidence the vulnerability of pregnant women to attack. Pregnant women are attacked and murdered for various reasons, with the desire to control the overriding one. There is little academic study in the UK, and none about the murder of an expectant mother by a stranger. The exceptional murder of Marie Wilks shocked the British public, not only by its brutality but in its singularity. The United States has a crime of murder of the unborn child, with the "Unborn Victims of Violence Act", of 2004. The UK has no such laws. An unborn child is not a person in law in the UK, although there is a law of child destruction, which has been difficult to prove in most cases. The murder of Marie Wilks also caused the death of her unborn child.

=== Bystander theory ===
One of the most shocking aspects of the crime was that 11-year-old Georgina Gough was seen walking down the hard shoulder, carrying her baby nephew, looking for her sister, and that no motorist stopped to help her. Latane and Darley found that sometimes apathy stops intervention. People tend to use excuses, in this case, being in a car on a motorway. There are "strong situational factors" at play that stop a person acting in a critical situation. The term "bystander effect" refers to the theory that the more witnesses there are, the fewer will help in crisis. Applying this to the M50 murder, it is possible to theorise that those people in cars imagined that "someone else" would do something, the "diffusion of responsibility" hypothesis.

=== Withholding of evidence by the police ===
Detective Inspector Peter Clarke was off duty and driving on the M50 on 18 June 1988, when he spotted a man on the hard shoulder as well as a car. In court, he described what he had seen; a grey/silver car and a blond man. However, West Mercia Constabulary had not told the court that Inspector Clarke had agreed to undergo hypnotism in order to better recollect specific details. During hypnosis, however, Inspector Clarke gave the car registration number as C856HFK. Eddie Browning's car registration was C754VAD. The police also reserved other evidence from further witnesses. The successful 1994 appeal by Browning hinged on this abuse of process, the non- disclosure of evidence and this led, along with other similar cases to the Criminal Procedure and Investigation Act of 1996. Before this Act, defence barristers had access to all "unused material". In reality, the senior investigative officer decided what was shared. The conviction of Browning overturned on appeal was one of a series of cases where an appeal was upheld because of non-disclosure of possibly pertinent evidence. The Home Secretary, in 1996, took the decision of disclosure away from the police and gave it to the Crown Prosecution Service. The CPS would then apply the test "does the unused material assist the defence or undermine the prosecution". Lord Chief Justice Taylor decided that if the new evidence had been included at the original trial, it was impossible to determine whether the verdict would still have been guilty.

=== Use of hypnosis in criminal investigations ===
In 1977, the use of hypnosis in order to retrieve "hidden" evidence from a witness to a crime, was treated with some interest with studies concluding that it "may be a potential tool to get information". The fact that Browning had got off on the hypnosis evidence even though the witness had only apparently invented the evidence to be helpful had apparently highlighted the pitfalls of hypnosis as evidence and its accuracy, and in 1995 the Court of Appeal which had previously freed Browning stated that "hypnosis... should not normally be considered in relation to witnesses who might be called to give material evidence". In 2018, The Crown Prosecution Service concluded that the use of hypnosis may be subject to "cueing" or suggestion planting. A hypnosis subject should only be used as a witness in 'exceptional circumstances'.

== In popular culture ==
Belinda Bauer has written a novel loosely based on the murder of Marie Wilks, called Snap. The novel was long-listed for the Booker Prize 2018.

== See also ==
- List of solved missing person cases
- Murder of Melanie Hall – unsolved murder of a woman whose remains were found next to the M5 motorway in 2009
- Murders of Jacqueline Ansell-Lamb and Barbara Mayo – two unsolved murders of young women who, in 1970, were also abducted and killed on motorways in England
- Murder of Alison Shaughnessy – another contemporary murder case where an initial conviction was overturned and no other suspects have been uncovered
- Murder of Deborah Linsley – unsolved 1988 murder of a woman travelling alone on a train in London, once linked in the press to Wilks' murder
