= Chislehurst Junction =

Coordinates: 51.399°N 0.0643°E

Chislehurst Junction is an important railway junction near Chislehurst in the London Borough of Bromley, England. It is the point where the South Eastern Main Line and the Chatham Main Line pass over each other, with diversion chords between each line. These are arranged such that a London-bound train on one line can transfer to the other, and likewise for services heading away from the capital.

== History ==
=== Before nationalisation ===
The railways previously passed over each other without a junction, until the merger of the London, Chatham and Dover Railway (LCDR) and the South Eastern Railway (SER) on 1 January 1899 meant it made operational sense to build connections between the previously disparate networks. The first connection, the "down" Bickley Loop, opened on 8 September 1902 with a length of 3/4 miles (1 km). The reverse connection opened six days later. These connecting loops allowed trains to/from London Victoria to operate on the former SER line. The west and east ends of the loops became known as Bickley Junction and Orpington Junction respectively, named after the next stations on the line at the time. The corresponding connection (the Chislehurst Loops), allowing transfer of Charing Cross trains to/from the Chatham line was, opened on 19 June 1904.

From 1925 the Southern Railway — which had been formed in 1923 assuming the junction's previous owners — began to electrify the routes through the junction. The first to be installed with a third rail was the Bickley Loop, on 12 July 1925. This was followed by full electrification between Orpington Junction and Charing Cross on 28 February 1926. In connection with this wave of electrification, a three-storey red brick substation was installed, immediately to the north of the Chatham line and west of the Charing Cross line.

The next electrification did not take place until 1935, when on 6 January the Chislehurst Loops became live along with the section of the line between Bickley and Swanley. Electrification was further extended to Gillingham on 2 July 1939.

In the meantime, a new station had been opened at Petts Wood, 1/3 mi (0.5 km) south of Orpington Junction, on 9 July 1928. This eventually led to the renaming from Orpington Junction to Petts Wood Junction on 8 July 1936, in keeping with the practice of naming a junction after its closest station.

The last development of the junction under the administration of the Southern Railway came in 1941, when bomb damage to a wooden signal box required its replacement with an austere flat-roofed brick construction. The robust design of the new edifice was in reaction to the continued air raid threat.

=== After nationalisation ===
Following the nationalisation of railways in Britain in 1948, major modification of the network took place. Chislehurst Junction benefited in the form of the 1959 Kent Coast Electrification programme, which saw the Victoria-Chatham line quadrupled between Bickley and Swanley. Semaphore signals were replaced throughout with colour light signals, which brought about the need for a "power box" at Chislehurst Junction, situated between the two mainline routes, on the west side of the South Eastern Main Line. This assumed the functions of the mechanical signal boxes at Bickley, Chislehurst and Petts Wood junctions on 31 May 1959.

As part of the same project, work was undertaken to modify the junctions in order to increase the speed limit. The Bickley Loops were realigned to allow trains to pass through at 50 mph (80 km/h), instead of 30 mph (48 km/h) previously. This realignment also required the reconstruction of the bridge which took the South Eastern Main Line over the Down Bickley Loop.

The next modification to the signalling arrangement came in 1976, when the multi-panel London Bridge signal box became operational. This allowed the reversible operation of the Down Chislehurst Loop. The 1959-"power box" remained the primary control point for these lines in this area until 12 June 1983. This date saw the expansion of Victoria Signalling Centre's scope of control as far as the boundary of Rochester signal box. Chislehurst Junction signal box retained control over the South Eastern Main Line until 1993, when it was taken over as part of the gradual implementation of Ashford Signalling Centre. Meanwhile, in 1992/1993, the "Up" and "Down" Bickley Loops were doubled to accommodate Eurostar operations, which began in earnest on 14 November 1994. The new Down Slow Bickley Loop shares the same alignment as the Up Chislehurst where they pass under the South Eastern Main Line. This created a new junction named Hawkwood Junction.

== Boundaries ==
Railway lines, being physical lines, are often conveniently used for administrative boundaries. The railway lines of Chislehurst Junction are used as the boundaries of three electoral wards, and three postcode districts in the BR postcode area, they are, Bickley, BR1 to the west, Chislehurst, BR7 to the north and Petts Wood, BR5 to the southeast; this also makes it the boundary between the two parliament constituencies, of Bromley and Chislehurst to the north and Orpington to the south.
