= Petts Wood railway station =

Railway station in southern England

Petts Wood
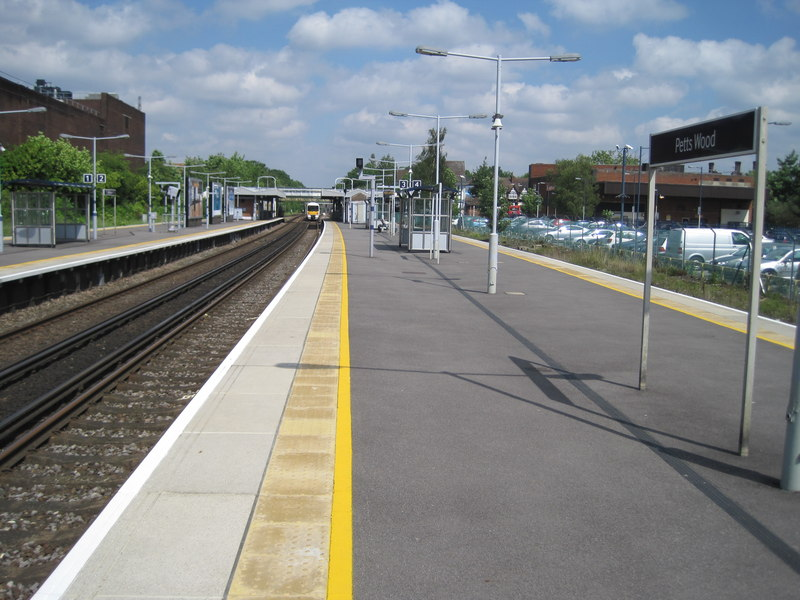
- Interactive map of Petts Wood

General information
- Location: Petts Wood
- Local authority: London Borough of Bromley
- Managed by: Southeastern
- Station code: PET
- DfT category: C2
- Number of platforms: 4
- Fare zone: 5

National Rail annual entry and exit
- 2020–21: ▼0.399 million
- 2021–22: ▲1.051 million
- 2022–23: ▲1.392 million
- 2023–24: ▲1.596 million
- 2024–25: ▲1.708 million

Key dates
- 9 July 1928: Opened

Other information
- External links: Departures; Facilities
- Coordinates: 51.3889°N 0.0742°E

Petts Wood railway station is on the South Eastern Main Line, serving Petts Wood in the London Borough of Bromley, south-eastern Greater London. It is 12 miles 53 chains (20.4 km) down the line from London Charing Cross and is situated between Chislehurst and Orpington stations. It is in London fare zone 5.

It has four platform faces on islands located between the slow and fast pairs of tracks. To the north of the station is Petts Wood Junction, where the up (London-bound) and down (country-bound) loop lines link the lines from Charing Cross and Victoria. The station is managed by Southeastern. There is a waiting room serving the two slow lines. The booking office, Oystercard readers, and ticket machines are all situated at footbridge level; this footbridge is always open to non-passengers.

== History ==
The station was built on the main line to the north of Orpington and opened on 9 July 1928, initially as a single island platform, with the first tickets printed showing the name as Pett's Wood. The residential areas now surrounding it developed from that date: now the railway divides Petts Wood East and Petts Wood West.

In March 2024, a project to create step-free access at the station was completed.

== Connections ==
London Buses routes 208, 273, R3, R7 and night route N199 serve the station.

== Services ==
Off peak, all services at Petts Wood are operated by Southeastern using Class 376, 465, 466 and 707 EMUs.

The typical off-peak service in trains per hour is:

- 4 tph to London Victoria via Herne Hill
- 2 tph to London Charing Cross via Lewisham
- 2 tph to London Cannon Street
- 8 tph to Orpington of which 2 continue to Sevenoaks

Additional services, including a number of Thameslink services between Orpington, Kentish Town and Luton via Catford call at the station during the peak hours.

On Sundays, the services between London Cannon Street and Orpington do not run.

From the December 2024 timetable change the off-peak service between London Victoria and Orpington doubled to 4tph on Mondays to Fridays.

Preceding station	National Rail	Following station
Chislehurst	Southeastern Grove Park Line	Orpington
Bickley	Southeastern Bromley South Line	Orpington
Bickley	Thameslink Catford Loop Line Peak Hours Only	Orpington

== See also ==
- Murder of Deborah Linsley – unsolved murder of a woman that occurred on a train travelling between Petts Wood and London Victoria in 1988

== Bibliography ==
- Mitchell, V & Smith, K (1991). Southern Main Lines: Charing Cross to Orpington. Midhurst, West Sussex: Middleton Press. ISBN 0-906520-96-7.
