= Orpington railway station =

Rail station in south-east London

Orpington
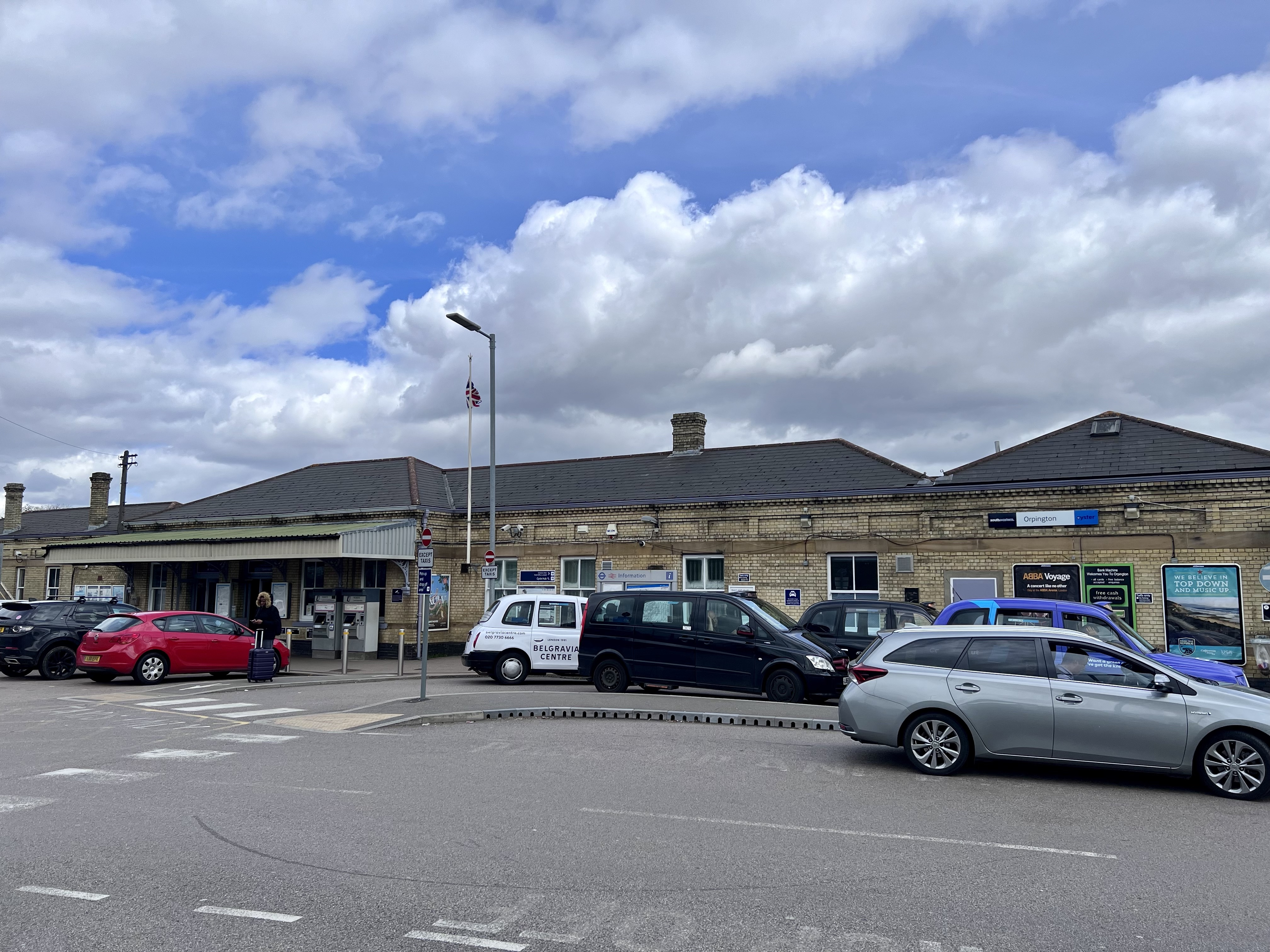
- The station main entrance off Crofton Road in 2023
- Interactive map of Orpington

General information
- Location: Orpington
- Local authority: London Borough of Bromley
- Managed by: Southeastern
- Station code: ORP
- DfT category: C2
- Number of platforms: 8
- Accessible: Yes
- Fare zone: 6

National Rail annual entry and exit
- 2020–21: ▼1.308 million
- Interchange: ▼0.189 million
- 2021–22: ▲3.189 million
- Interchange: ▲0.549 million
- 2022–23: ▲4.030 million
- Interchange: ▲0.579 million
- 2023–24: ▲4.586 million
- Interchange: ▼0.511 million
- 2024–25: ▲4.990 million
- Interchange: ▲0.725 million

Key dates
- 2 March 1868: Opened
- 1904: Rebuilt
- 1925: Electrification

Other information
- External links: Departures; Facilities
- Coordinates: 51.3741°N 0.0885°E

Orpington railway station is on the South Eastern Main Line, serving the town of Orpington in the London Borough of Bromley, south-east London. It is 13 miles 65 chains (22.2 km) down the line from London Charing Cross and is situated between Petts Wood and Chelsfield stations. It is in London fare zone 6.

== History ==
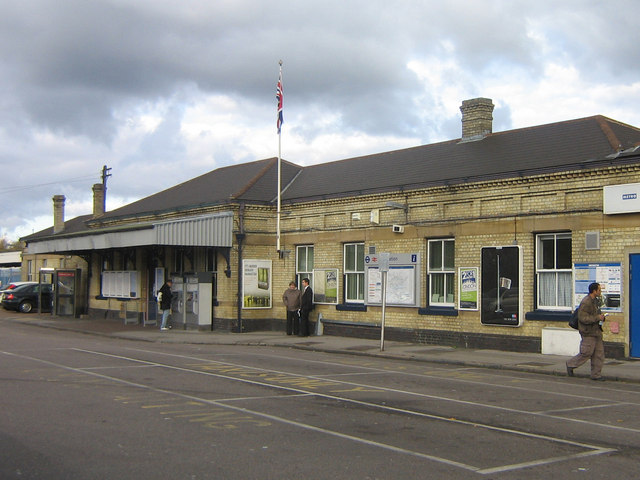
The Station Crofton Road entrance in 2007.

The station was opened on 2 March 1868 by the South Eastern Railway (SER), when the SER opened its cut-off line between Chislehurst and Sevenoaks. Previously, trains between London and Tunbridge Wells had taken a circuitous route via Redhill. The line was widened and the station rebuilt in 1904, expanding to six platforms. Third rail electrification reached Orpington in 1925, and extended to Sevenoaks in 1935.

About this time the Southern Heights Light Railway was proposed, which would have diverged from the main line south of Orpington and finished at Sanderstead. Crofton Roman Villa was partly destroyed by a railway cutting in the late 1800s but was rediscovered in 1926 when work was carried out to the area to the west of the station entrance as an entrance to a new council building.

Platforms 7 and 8 were built in the early 1990s on the site of former carriage sidings. In 2008, the station became fully accessible following the opening of a new footbridge providing lift access to all platforms. As of 2013, the former steam locomotive shed (closed for steam in 1926; in use as sidings until 1960) is still standing, converted to offices (sited adjacent to platform 8). In 2014 the car park was rebuilt with 2 storeys to increase capacity.

== Layout ==
The station has eight platforms. Platform 1 is a bay platform which is only used for extra capacity during rush hour and other periods of high traffic.

Platforms 2-5 are through platforms. Platform 2 is used for fast services to Charing Cross or Cannon Street. Platforms 3 and 4 are an island, 3 used by trains towards Ashford International or Tunbridge Wells and 4 by stopping services from Sevenoaks to Charing Cross or Cannon Street. Platform 5 hosts the Sevenoaks slows.

Bay platforms 6-8 are bay platforms for stopping services towards Charing Cross, London Victoria, Cannon Street and Luton/Bedford. At the country end, the four tracks become two. At the London end there is a four-road sidings, where trains are stabled and cleaned.

There are two entrances, both containing ticket offices and ticket barriers. The main entrance is on the platform 1/2 side (Crofton Road), while the other entrance is on the platform 5-8 side (Station Approach and the bus interchange). Access to platforms 3 and 4 is available via an underground subway (inaccessible for wheelchair users) or via a bridge opened in 2008 which incorporates lift access to all platforms.

== Parking ==
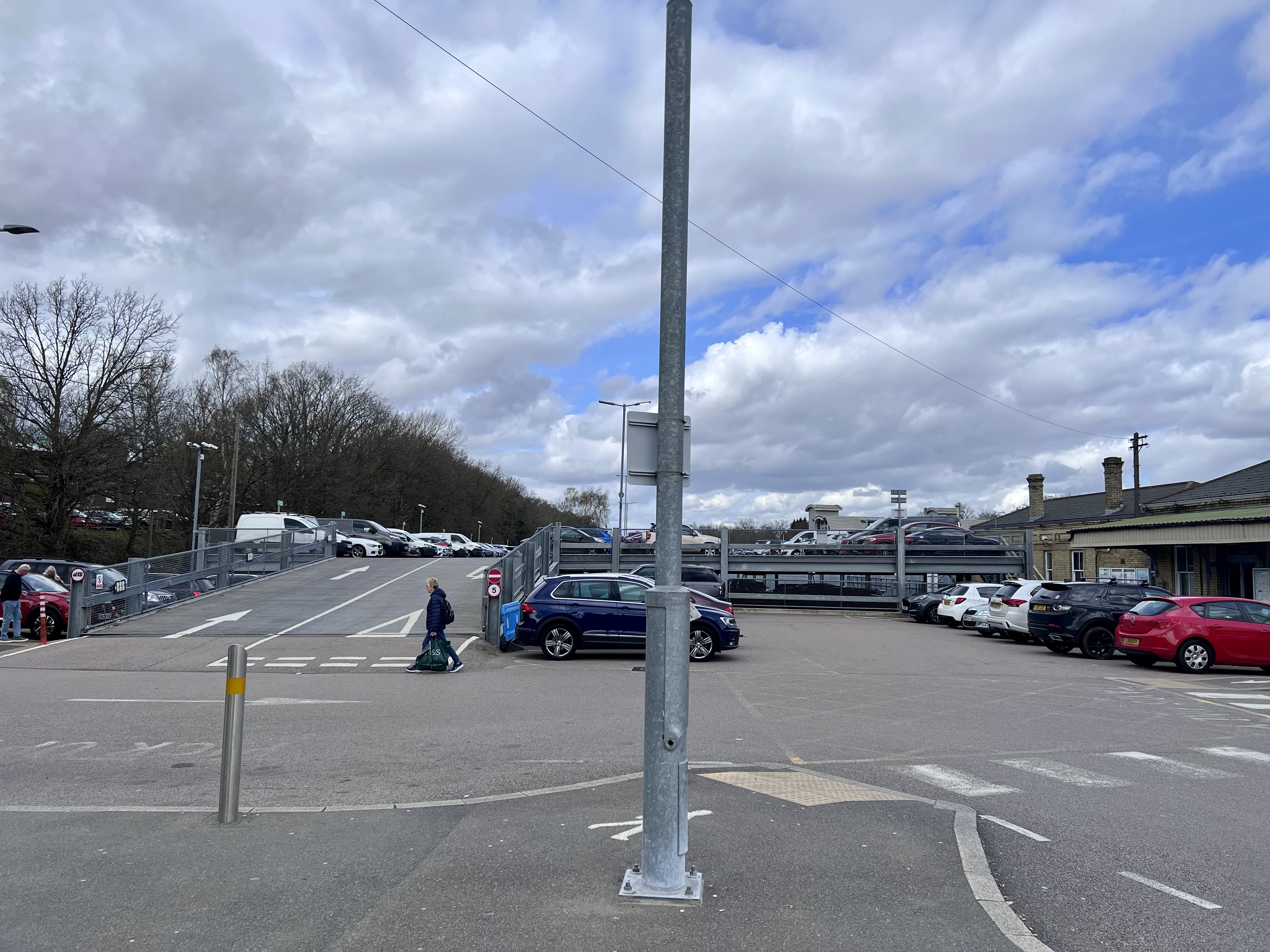
The Station Multi-story car Park built in 2014.

The multi-story car park with a capacity of 142 cars was inaugurated in 2014. Southeastern rail company funded the expansion with a cost of £1.9 million. Jo Johnson, who was serving as the MP for Orpington, as well as David Statham, Southeastern's Managing Director at the time, were hosting the event.

== Services ==
Services at Orpington are operated by Southeastern and Thameslink using Class 375, 376, 465, 466, 700 and 707 EMUs.

The typical off-peak service in trains per hour is:

- 4 tph to London Victoria via Herne Hill
- 4 tph to London Charing Cross (2 of these run non-stop to London Bridge and 2 are stopping services via Lewisham)
- 2 tph to London Cannon Street
- 2 tph to Sevenoaks (all stations)
- 2 tph to Hastings via Tunbridge Wells (1 semi-fast, 1 stopping)

Additional services, including a number of Thameslink services between to and from Kentish Town and Luton via Catford call at the station during the peak hours.

On Sundays, the services to and from London Cannon Street do not run.

Preceding station	National Rail	Following station
London Bridge	Southeastern South Eastern Main Line	Sevenoaks
Petts Wood	Southeastern Grove Park Line	Chelsfield or Terminus
Petts Wood	Southeastern Bromley South Line	Terminus
Petts Wood	Thameslink Catford Loop Line Peak Hours Only	Terminus

== Connections ==
London Buses routes 51, 61, 208, 353, 358, B14, R1, R2, R3, R4, R5, R6, R7, R8, R9, R10, school routes 654, 684, night route N199, and Go-Coach route 3 serve the station.

== See also ==
- Murder of Deborah Linsley – unsolved 1988 murder of a woman who boarded an Orpington–London Victoria train at Petts Wood. A man had been seen staring at women boarding the train at Orpington.
