= London Victoria station =

London Underground and railway station

Victoria
- London Victoria
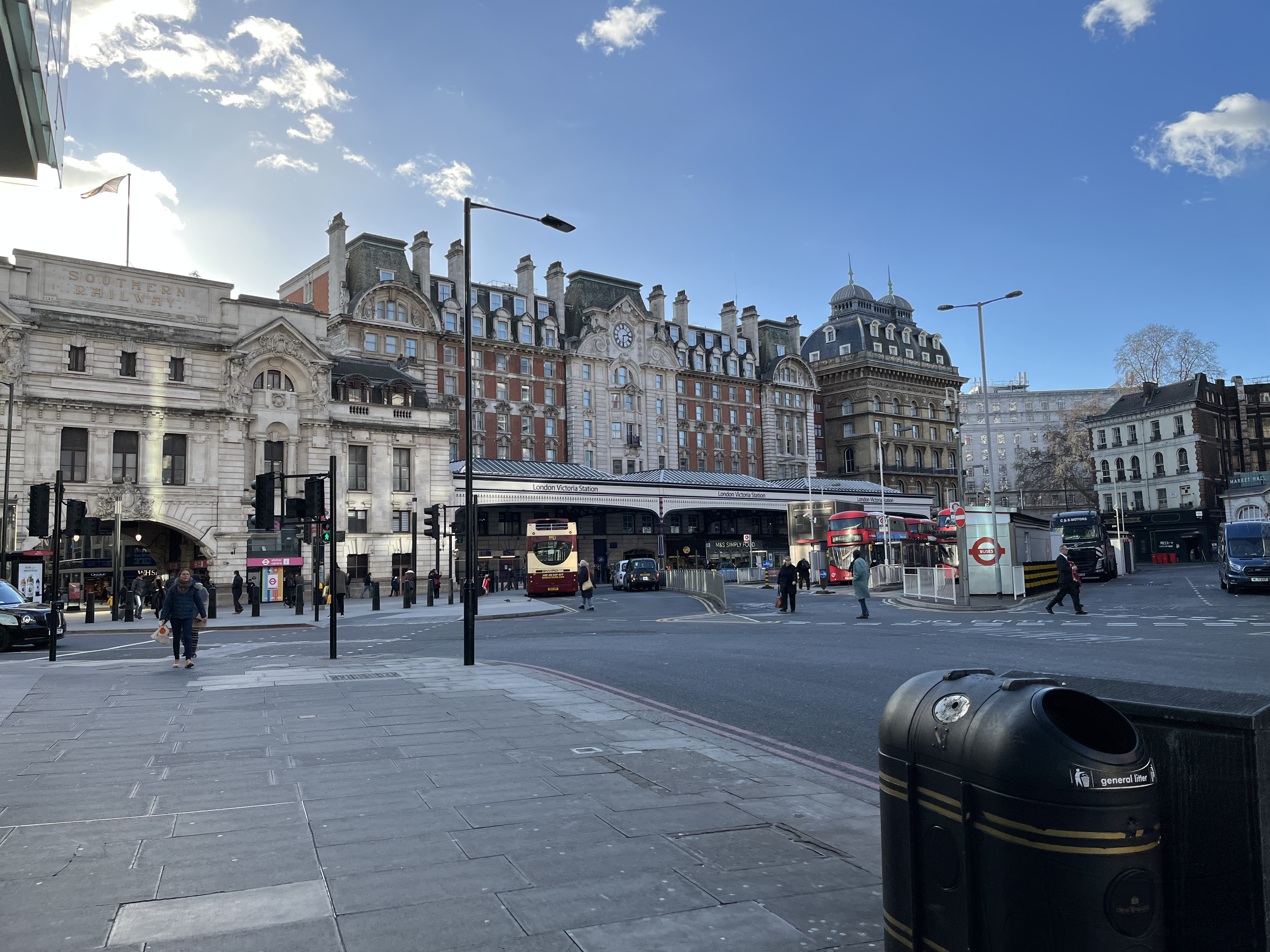
- Victoria Station in Westminster, London
- Interactive map of Victoria

General information
- Location: Victoria
- Local authority: City of Westminster
- Managed by: Network Rail
- Owner: Network Rail
- Station code: VIC
- DfT category: A
- Number of platforms: 19
- Accessible: Yes
- Fare zone: 1
- OSI: Victoria
- Cycle parking: Yes – platforms 7–8 & 17–18
- Toilet facilities: Yes

National Rail annual entry and exit
- 2020–21: ▼13.791 million
- Interchange: ▼1.385 million
- 2021–22: ▲36.776 million
- Interchange: ▲3.296 million
- 2022–23: ▲45.564 million
- Interchange: ▼3.268 million
- 2023–24: ▲50.830 million
- Interchange: ▲3.290 million
- 2024–25: ▲53.784 million
- Interchange: ▼3.232 million

Key dates
- 1 October 1860: Opened by Victoria Station and Pimlico Railway
- 1860: Leased to London Brighton and South Coast Railway
- 25 August 1862: Separate station opened for London, Chatham and Dover and Great Western Railways

Other information
- External links: Departures; Facilities
- Coordinates: 51.4952°N 0.1441°W

Victoria station, also known as London Victoria, is a central London railway terminus and connected London Underground station in Victoria, in the City of Westminster, managed by Network Rail. Named after the nearby Victoria Street, the mainline station is a terminus of the Brighton Main Line to Gatwick Airport and Brighton and the Chatham Main Line to Ramsgate and Dover via Chatham. From the main lines, trains can connect to the Catford Loop Line, the Dartford Loop Line, the Sutton & Mole Valley lines to Dorking and the Oxted line to East Grinstead. Southern operates most commuter and regional services to south London, Sussex and parts of east Surrey and south-east Hampshire while Southeastern operates trains to south-east London and Kent, alongside limited services operated by Thameslink. Gatwick Express trains run direct to Gatwick. The London Underground station is served by three lines: Circle, District and Victoria. The area around the station is an important interchange for other forms of transport: a local bus station is in the forecourt and Victoria Coach Station is nearby, which serves national and international coaches.

Victoria was built to serve both the Brighton and Chatham Main Lines, and has always had a "split" feel of being two separate stations. The Brighton station opened in 1860 with the Chatham station following two years later. It replaced a temporary terminus at Pimlico, and construction involved building the Grosvenor Bridge over the River Thames. It became immediately popular as a London terminus, causing delays and requiring upgrades and rebuilding. It was well known for luxury Pullman train services and continental boat-train trips, and became a focal point for soldiers during World War I.

As at other London termini, steam trains were phased out of Victoria by the 1960s, to be replaced by suburban electric and diesel multiple-unit services; all services from the station are currently operated using third rail electric multiple units. Despite the end of international services following the opening of the Channel Tunnel, Victoria still remains an important London terminal station. The connected Underground station, in particular, suffered from overcrowding, until a major upgrade was completed in the late 2010s. Gatwick Express provides half-hourly non-stop direct services between London Victoria and Gatwick Airport. However Southern run more frequent semi-fast services to Gatwick Airport.

== Location ==
The station complex is in Victoria in the City of Westminster, immediately south of the London Inner Ring Road. It is located south of Victoria Street, east of Buckingham Palace Road and west of Vauxhall Bridge Road. Several railways lead into the station line by way of Grosvenor Bridge from the south west, south and south east. It is in London fare zone 1 and is one of 19 stations managed by Network Rail. It has been a Grade II listed building since 1970.

Victoria Coach Station is about 300 metres south-west of the railway stations. It is the main London coach terminal and serves all parts of the UK and mainland Europe.

The station is served by a large number of London Buses routes day and night, using Victoria bus station or neighbouring streets.

== History ==
=== Background ===
By 1850, railways serving destinations to the south of London had three termini available – London Bridge, Bricklayers' Arms and Waterloo. All three were inconvenient for Central London as they terminated south of the river Thames, whereas the main centres of population, business and government were north of the river in the City of London, the West End and Westminster.

Victoria Station was designed in a piecemeal fashion to help address this problem for the London Brighton and South Coast Railway (LB&SCR) and the London Chatham and Dover Railway (LC&DR). It consisted of two adjacent main line railway stations which, from the viewpoint of passengers, were unconnected.

=== Early history ===
Victoria Station in 1897, showing the separate Brighton (left) and Chatham (right) stations.

The London and Brighton Railway terminus at London Bridge provided reasonable access to the City of London but was inconvenient for travellers to and from Westminster. As early as 1842 John Urpeth Rastrick had proposed that the railway should build a branch to serve the West End, but his proposal was unsuccessful.

However, the transfer of the Crystal Palace from Hyde Park to Sydenham Hill between 1851 and 1854 created a major tourist attraction in the then rural area south of London, and the LB&SCR opened a branch line from the Brighton Main Line at Sydenham to the site in 1854. While this was under construction the West End of London and Crystal Palace Railway also planned a line from Crystal Palace, to a new station at Battersea Wharf, at the southern end of the new Chelsea Bridge. Despite its location, the new station was called Pimlico. It opened on 27 March 1858, but was very much regarded as a temporary terminus, composed of a small number of wooden huts, and positioned immediately next to a proposed bridge over the Thames. Shortly afterwards the LB&SCR leased most of the lines of the new railway, and built a further connection from Crystal Palace to the Brighton Main Line at Norwood Junction, thereby providing itself with a route into west London, although it was recognised that a terminus would be needed on the north side of the river.

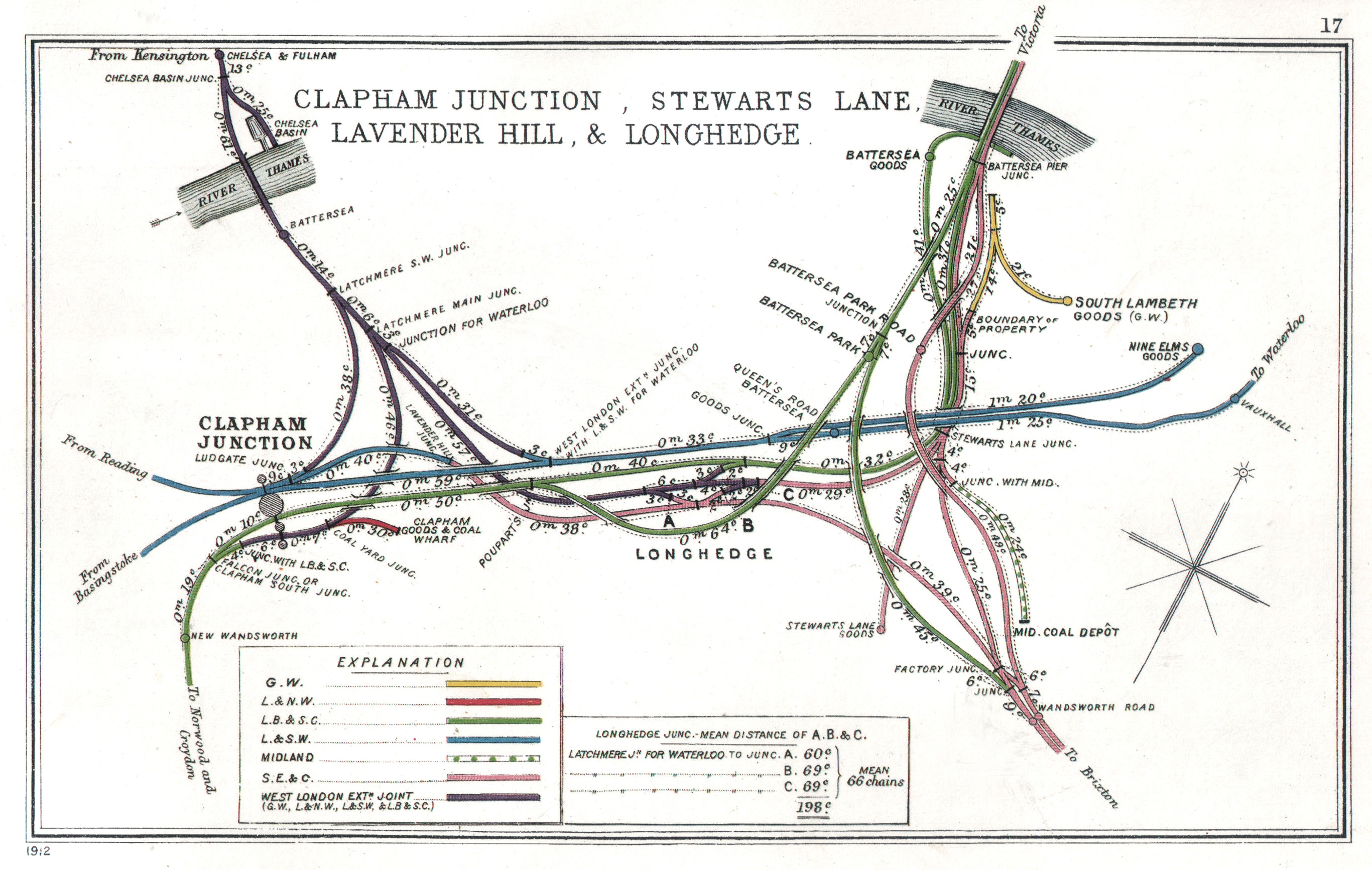
The approaches to Victoria Station in 1912. The line leading to the station is top right, the 'Brighton line' (shown in green) is bottom left and the 'Chatham line' (pink) bottom right. The connection to the GWR and LNWR (purple) is top left.

During the summer of 1857 a scheme for an independent "Grosvenor Basin Terminus" in the West End of London, "for the use of the Southern Railways of England" was mooted. The station was originally referred to as the "Grosvenor Terminus" but later renamed Victoria as it was sited at the end of Victoria Street. Three other railway companies were also seeking a terminus in Westminster: the Great Western (GWR), the London and North Western (LNWR), and the East Kent Railway (EKR). The first two already had rail access to Battersea through their joint ownership of the West London Line with the LB&SCR. In 1858, the EKR leased the remaining lines of the West End of London and Crystal Palace Railway from Shortlands railway station, and also negotiated temporary running powers over the lines recently acquired by the LB&SCR, pending the construction of its own line into west London. On 23 July 1859 these four companies together formed the Victoria Station and Pimlico Railway (VS&PR), with the object of extending the railway from Stewarts Lane Junction, Battersea across the river to a more convenient location nearer the West End, and the following month the EKR changed its name to the London Chatham and Dover Railway.

The new line followed part of the route of the Grosvenor Canal with Victoria station on the former canal basin. It required the construction of a new bridge over the Thames, originally known as Victoria Bridge and later as Grosvenor Bridge. The bridge was 930 feet (280 m) long, which was required so that it could clear all river traffic. It was designed by John Fowler. The line was built as mixed gauge from Longhedge Junction, Battersea, to cater for GWR trains. It required a 1-in-50 climb and a 15 chains (990 ft; 300 m) turn from the LSWR main line to reach the bridge. The LB&SCR had hoped to amalgamate with the VS&PR, and introduced a parliamentary bill to allow it to do so in 1860. This was opposed by the GWR and LC&DR and rejected. By way of compromise the LB&SCR was permitted to lease Victoria station from the VS&PR, but agreed to accommodate the other railways until a terminus could be built for them on an adjoining site.

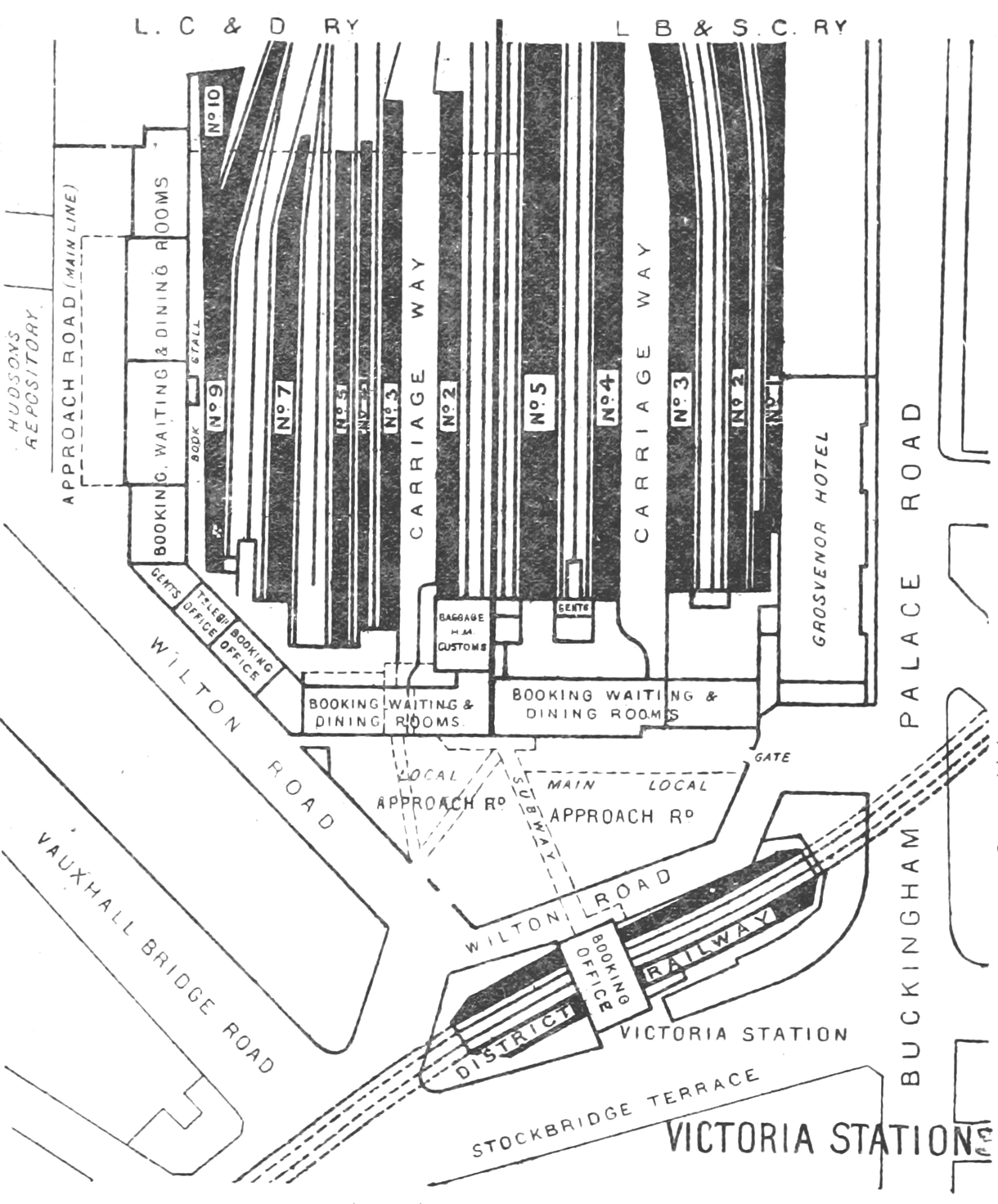
Plan of Victoria Station as it was in 1888. The 'Chatham' side was rebuilt in 1906 and the 'Brighton' side in 1898–1908

The LB&SCR side of Victoria station opened on 1 October 1860, the temporary terminus in Battersea having closed the day before. The station was designed by Robert Jacomb-Hood. It consisted of six platforms and ten tracks, with an entrance on Victoria Street. The site then covered 8.5 acres (3.4 ha) and was 800 feet (240 m) long and 230 feet (70 m) wide. The roof was built on a set of wrought iron girders, with an additional safety row that would allow the main girders to withstand a train strike. On the northwest corner of the station was the 300-bedroom Grosvenor Hotel. It was designed by J. T. Knowles, and run independently of the station itself. It opened in 1861. The LCDR and GWR opened their own station on 25 August 1862, occupying a less imposing wooden-fronted building with an entrance on Wilton Road. The Chatham line station had eight platforms, five of which were of mixed gauge, shared by broad-gauge trains of the GWR from Windsor via Southall.

=== Post-opening ===
Victoria station proved to be unexpectedly popular for both the main companies, and by 1862 there were frequent delays due to congestion at Stewarts Lane Junction. In March 1863 the LB&SCR and the LC&DR jointly funded a new high-level route into Victoria, avoiding Stewarts Lane and requiring the widening of Grosvenor Bridge, including the replacement of the broad-gauge rails with a third LB&SCR line. The work was completed during 1867/8. The South Eastern Railway (SER) wanted to use Victoria as a London terminus as it was more convenient than London Bridge, but were advised they would need to pay extensive tolls and expenses to do so. Consequently, the SER constructed a station at Charing Cross instead.

The GWR began services on 1 April 1863, connecting Victoria to Southall, and later some services to Uxbridge, Reading, Slough and Windsor. From 13 August 1866 the LB&SCR ran services from Victoria to London Bridge along the newly completed South London Line. The Great Northern Railway began a service from Victoria to Barnet (via Ludgate Hill) on 1 March 1868, with other cross-London services running via Victoria in the 1870s.

In 1898 the LB&SCR decided to demolish its station and replace it with an enlarged red-brick Renaissance-style building, designed by Charles Langbridge Morgan. Since widening of the station was prevented by the LC&DR station and Buckingham Palace Road, increased capacity was achieved by lengthening the platforms and building crossovers to allow two trains to use each platform simultaneously. Work was completed in 1908, and included the rebuilding of the Grosvenor Hotel at the same time. The site then covered 16 acres (6.5 ha) with 2.25 miles (3.62 km) of platforms. Overhead electric trains began to run into Victoria on 1 December 1909, to London Bridge. The line to Crystal Palace was electrified on 12 May 1911.

Victoria became well known for its Pullman services during the late 19th century. The LB&SCR introduced the first Pullman first-class service to Brighton on 1 November 1875, followed by the first all-Pullman train in the UK on 1 December 1881. Another all-Pullman service was introduced in 1908 under the name of the Southern Belle, then described as "... the most luxurious train in the world...". The SECR began Pullman continental services on 21 April 1910 and on domestic services to the Kent coast on 16 June 1919. The Golden Arrow, another all-Pullman train began services in 1924, and remained in service until 30 September 1972.

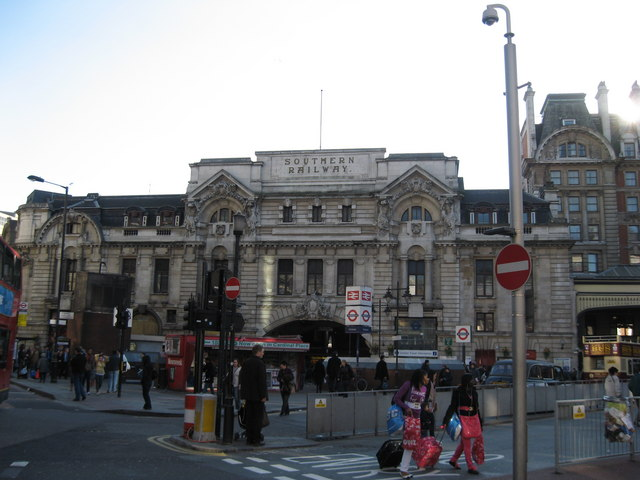
The London Chatham and Dover Station as rebuilt by the South Eastern and Chatham Railway.

The LC&DR and GWR jointly leased the 'Chatham' portion of the station for 999 years from 28 June 1860, with the GWR responsible for 6.67%. The LC&DR completed its main line as far as Canterbury on 3 December 1860 and began to use the LB&SCR station on that day.

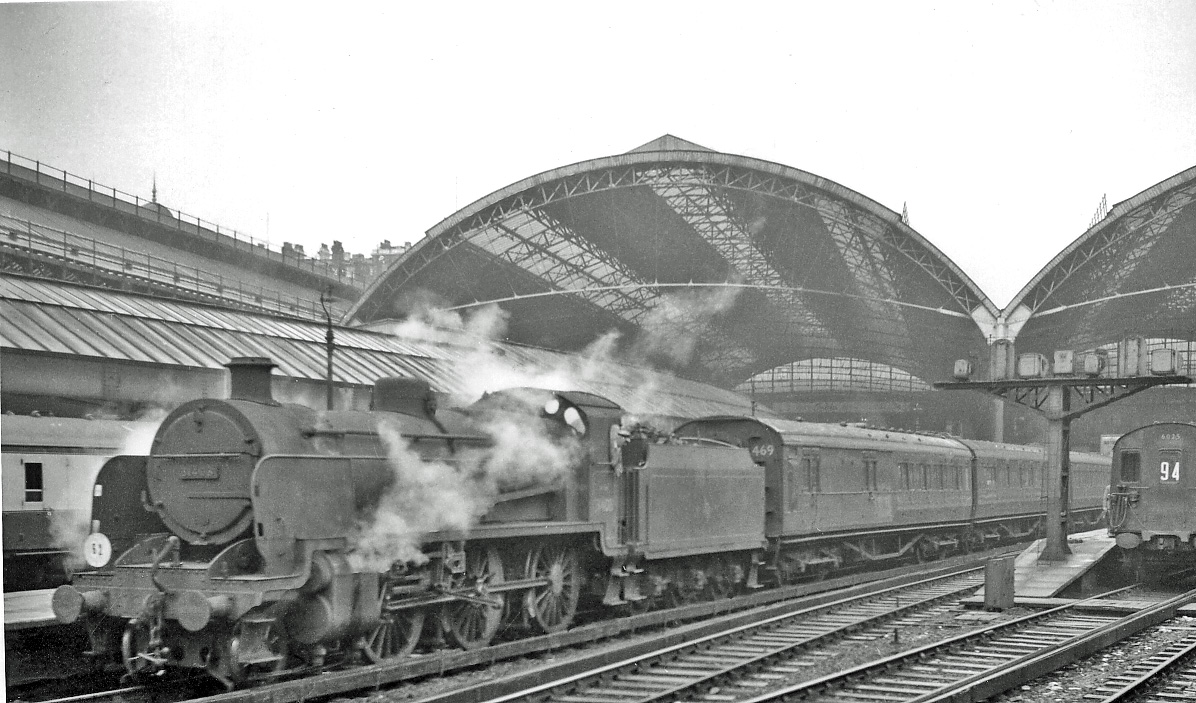
The Eastern side in 1958

From 1899 the LC&DR entered a working union with its rival, the South Eastern Railway, to form the South Eastern and Chatham Railway (SECR). As a result, services from its station at Victoria began to be rationalised and integrated with those from the other SECR termini.

The LC&DR station began to be reconstructed in the late 19th century after several properties on Buckingham Palace Road, and the hotel, were bought by the company. Work began in 1899 with the removal of the old roof. The rebuilt station was partially opened on 10 June 1906, with additional platforms and cab exit on 10 February the following year, along with a new annexe to the hotel. It was formally re-opened on 1 July 1908. As a consequence of the rebuilding, boat trains become more popular from Victoria compared to Charing Cross and Cannon Street. Services increased to serve Ostend and Calais via Dover and Rotterdam via Gravesend. The LB&SCR part of the station also served Dieppe via Newhaven.

Victoria has since seen more visits from royalty and heads of state than any other London station. During the funeral of Edward VII, seven kings, over 20 princes and five archdukes were greeted here.

In the early 20th century, the development and improvement of the London Underground, meant that Victoria could not compete as a cross-London service. GNR trains stopped running on 1 October 1907, with Midland ones following in June the next year. The GWR ceased to use the station for scheduled services on 21 March 1915, partly due to World War I in addition to the new Underground lines. Victoria was used as the main station for drafted soldiers, and those returning from action in the war. By the middle of the war, the station served twelve trains a day running between Victoria and Folkestone, with additional trains serving Dover. The station was regularly served with a voluntary buffet for departing soldiers, who served up to 4,000 men a day. Victoria itself did not suffer significant damage during the war, but a section of Grosvenor Bridge was destroyed after an anti-aircraft shell struck a gas main underneath it.

Following the war, memorials were built on both parts of the station. The Southern Railway side marks 626 soldiers killed or missing, while the Chatham side marks 556. A plaque marks the arrival of the body of The Unknown Warrior at Victoria on 10 November 1920.

The service to Ostend via Dover was re-introduced on 18 January 1919. Civilian trains to Boulogne via Folkestone restarted on 3 February. Boat train services to Newhaven started on 1 June, and a connection with Paris started on 15 July. On 8 January 1920, Victoria replaced Charing Cross as the main station for continental services, as it had more facilities and closer locomotive and carriage facilities. The service to Paris via Calais and Dover began on the same day.

=== Southern Railway ===
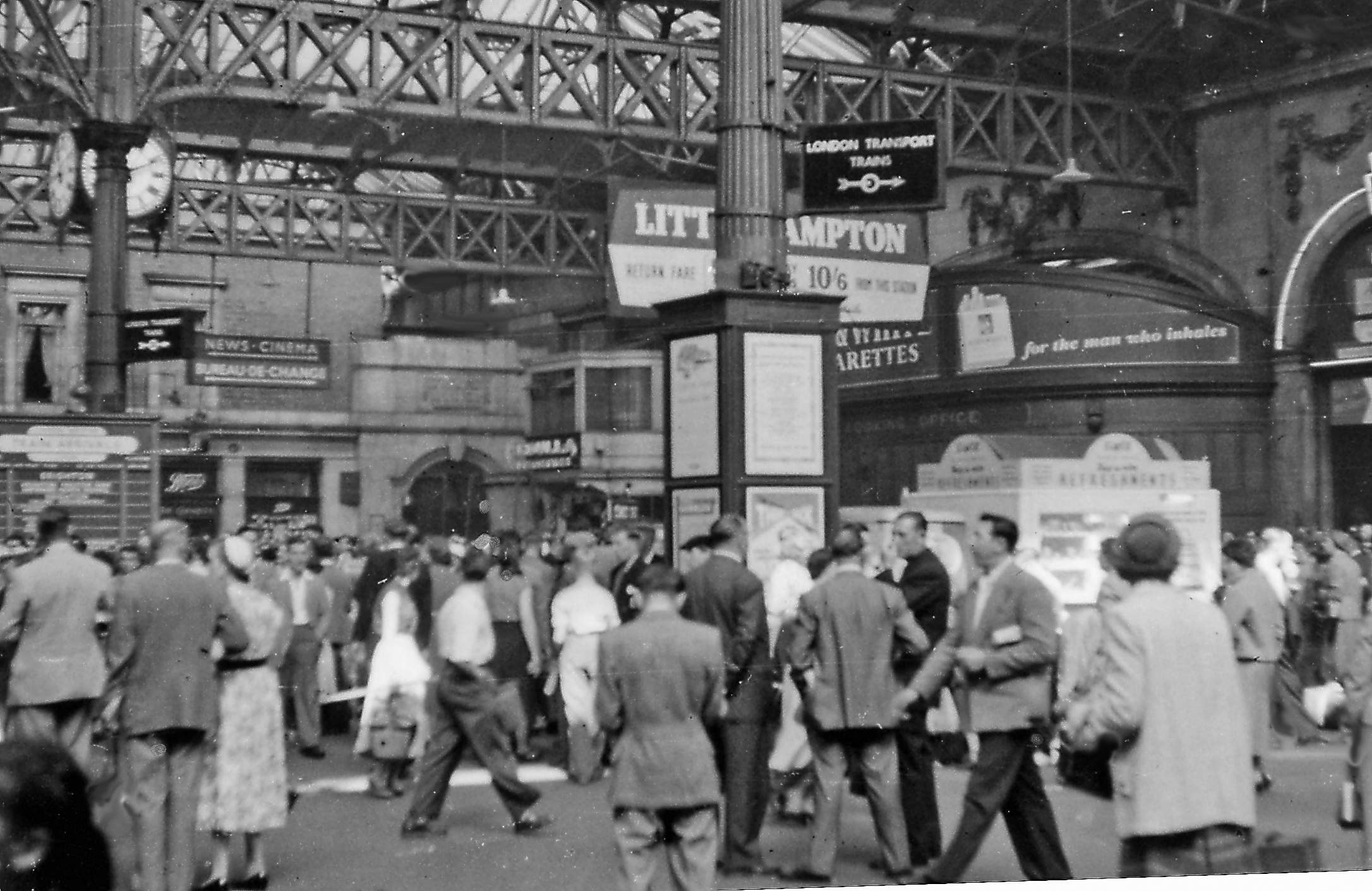
The Brighton side concourse in 1955

The two stations at Victoria came largely under single ownership in 1923 with the formation of the Southern Railway (SR) as part of the Big Four grouping. The following year steps were taken to integrate the two stations. The platforms were renumbered in a single sequence, openings were made in the wall separating them to allow passengers to pass from one to the other without going into the street, and alterations were made to the tracks to allow for interchangeable working. The work was completed in 1925, and all platforms were renumbered in a contiguous sequence. Electric suburban services to Herne Hill and Orpington first ran on 12 July that year, followed by South London line services on 17 June 1928, and electric services to Crystal Palace and Epsom (via Mitcham Junction) on 3 March 1929. The SR also concentrated continental steamer traffic at Victoria, introducing the Golden Arrow, in 1924, and the Night Ferry in 1936.

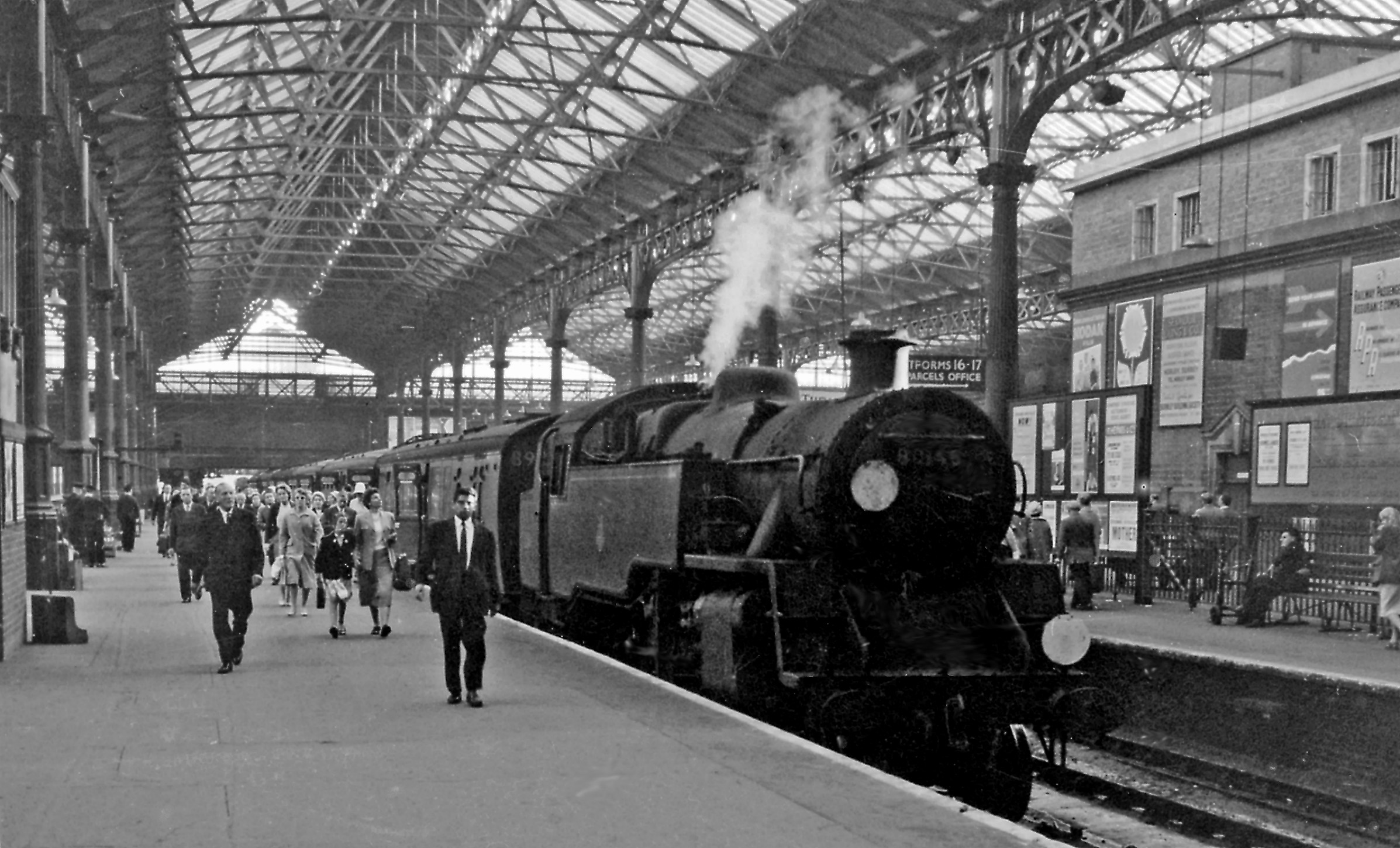
The Central side in 1961 with train from Tunbridge Wells West

The station had a news cinema (later a cartoon cinema) that showed a continuous programme. The cinema was designed by Alister MacDonald, son of the Prime Minister Ramsay, and was in operation from 1933 until it was demolished in 1981. The GWR remained part-owner of the station until 1932 thereafter retaining running powers, although it does not appear to have used them.

Night-train services stopped running from Victoria on 4 September 1939 after World War II was declared, and other services were terminated following the German invasion of France in May 1940. Though the station was bombed several times in 1940 and 1941, there was not enough damage to prevent operations. A plane crashed into the eastern side of the station on 15 September 1940 and a flying bomb caused partial damage on 27 June 1944.

The greatest change to the station during the 1920s and 1930s was the introduction of third-rail electrification for all suburban and many main-line services, replacing the original LB&SCR overhead scheme by 1929 and largely replacing steam traction, except on Chatham Section main-line and Oxted line trains. Services to Orpington were electrified in 1925 and to Epsom the following year. By 1932 the Brighton Main Line was electrified, quickly followed by those to other Sussex coastal towns and Portsmouth by 1938. The brand name "Southern Electric" was applied to all these services. The Brighton Belle, the first electric all-Pullman service in the world, ran from Victoria from 29 June 1934 until its withdrawal in 1972.

=== Nationalisation ===
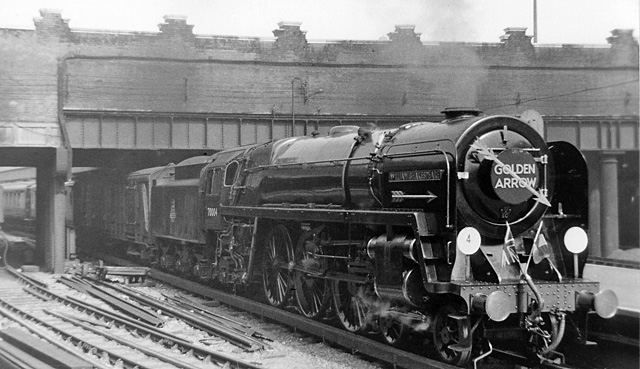
The Golden Arrow leaving Victoria Station, 1953

British Railways (BR) took over the station on 1 January 1948. A new set of offices for Continental trains opened on 14 June, while the eastern booking hall was renovated, opening on 5 February 1951.

During the 1950s and early 1960s British Railways (Southern Region) completed its Kent Coast Electrification schemes, which meant that most of the remaining services from the station were electrified, including boat trains. Some minor services were withdrawn, and the few remaining steam services, to Oxted and beyond, were replaced by diesel-electric multiple units. Various plans were proposed at this time to redevelop Victoria, including new offices, hotels and a helicopter station. The last steam service left Victoria on 8 January 1964 to East Grinstead, after which it was replaced by diesel-electric multiple units.

The station was redeveloped internally in the 1980s, with the addition of shops within the concourse, and above the western platforms as the "Victoria Place" shopping centre and 220,000 square feet (20,000 m^{2}) of office space. Platforms 16 and 17 opened on the site of the former taxi rank on 21 December 1987. A major re-signalling scheme was carried out during the works. The station was managed by Network SouthEast also under British Rail.

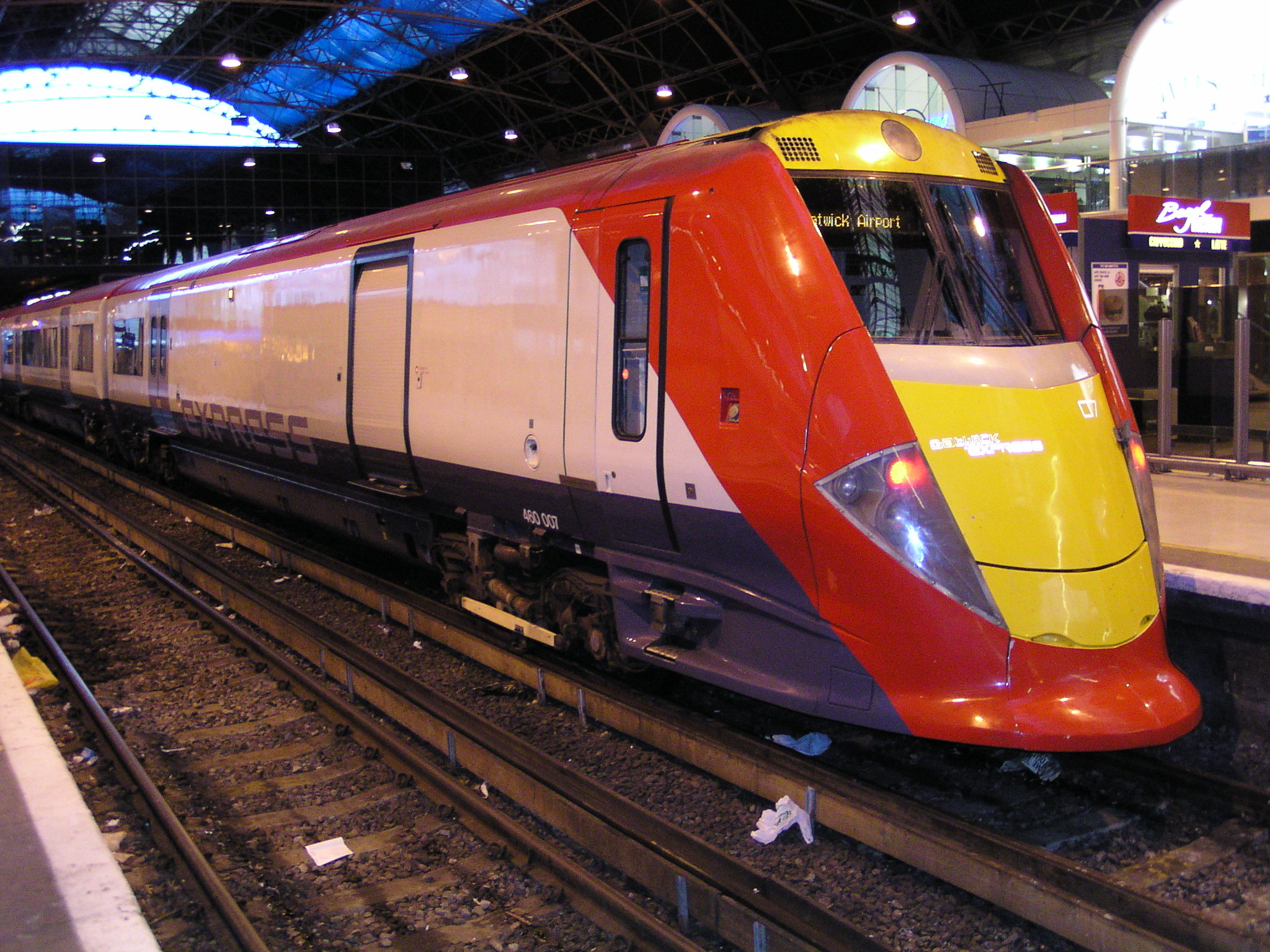
Gatwick Express service at Victoria in 2003

The other major change to the station under BR was the gradual development of services to Gatwick Airport station after its opening on 28 May 1958. A dedicated rail-air terminal opened on top of platform 15 on 1 May 1962, designed by Clive Pascall.

Several long-standing services from Victoria ended during the BR era. The Brighton Belle's final service was on 30 April 1972, followed by the last Golden Arrow on 30 September. The Night Ferry lasted until 31 October 1980, though the Venice-Simplon Orient Express, a luxury Pullman service, has been running intermittently since 1982.

In 1984 the non-stop Gatwick Express service was started, aiming for a 30-minute journey time. This was coupled with the provision of an airport lounge and check-in facilities at first-floor level, with dedicated escalators down to the Gatwick Express platforms. British Airways and other major airlines had their own check-in desks there. British Rail operated an International Travel Centre within the main station, separate from the domestic travel centre. At the time, Victoria was still a major departure point for international travel, with boat trains to Dover and Folkestone for France and Belgium and beyond. This ceased with the introduction of Eurostar in 1994, which did not serve Victoria, and the International Travel Centre closed.

== Future ==
Victoria is a proposed stop on Crossrail 2, the route of which has been safeguarded since 1991. The project would involve the construction of two new 250-metre (820 ft) long platforms, and new entrances onto Ebury Street and the main National Rail station. The District and Circle line ticket hall would be expanded and include a direct connection to the new Crossrail station. Crossrail 2 trains would also be able to reverse at Victoria. The service proposes to run 30 additional trains per hour through the station, which is expected to reduce crowding in Victoria by 25%.

In January 2020, Victoria BID – the local Business improvement district – proposed removing the bus station from the mainline station forecourt to create a new "Station Square". Bus stops would be relocated to nearby streets.

In 2024, Network Rail announced that architects Hawkins/Brown and Acme Space had begun work on a future "major office-led redevelopment" of the station.

== Services ==
In 2019/20, Victoria was the second-busiest station in the UK, with an estimated 73.6 million passenger entries/exits. However, as with other stations, patronage dropped dramatically as a result of the COVID-19 pandemic. The estimated usage figure fell 81% in 2020/21 to 13.8 million, although Victoria retained its rank in second place, behind Stratford.

Operationally, there are two separate main line termini:

- The eastern (Chatham) side, comprising platforms 1–8, is the terminus for Southeastern services to Kent on the Chatham Main Line and its branches. This is also the London terminus for the Venice-Simplon Orient Express, from Platform 2, the longest platform. It was used for boat trains to Dover and Folkestone until these were made redundant by the introduction of Eurostar trains to the continent in 1994.
- The western (Brighton) side, comprising platforms 9–19, is the terminus for Southern and Gatwick Express services to Surrey, Sussex and parts of southern Hampshire including Gatwick Airport and Brighton on the Brighton Main Line and the East Grinstead branch on the Oxted Line.

Services are operated by Southeastern and Southern, owned by the Department for Transport and Govia respectively. All services at Victoria use electric multiple unit trains.

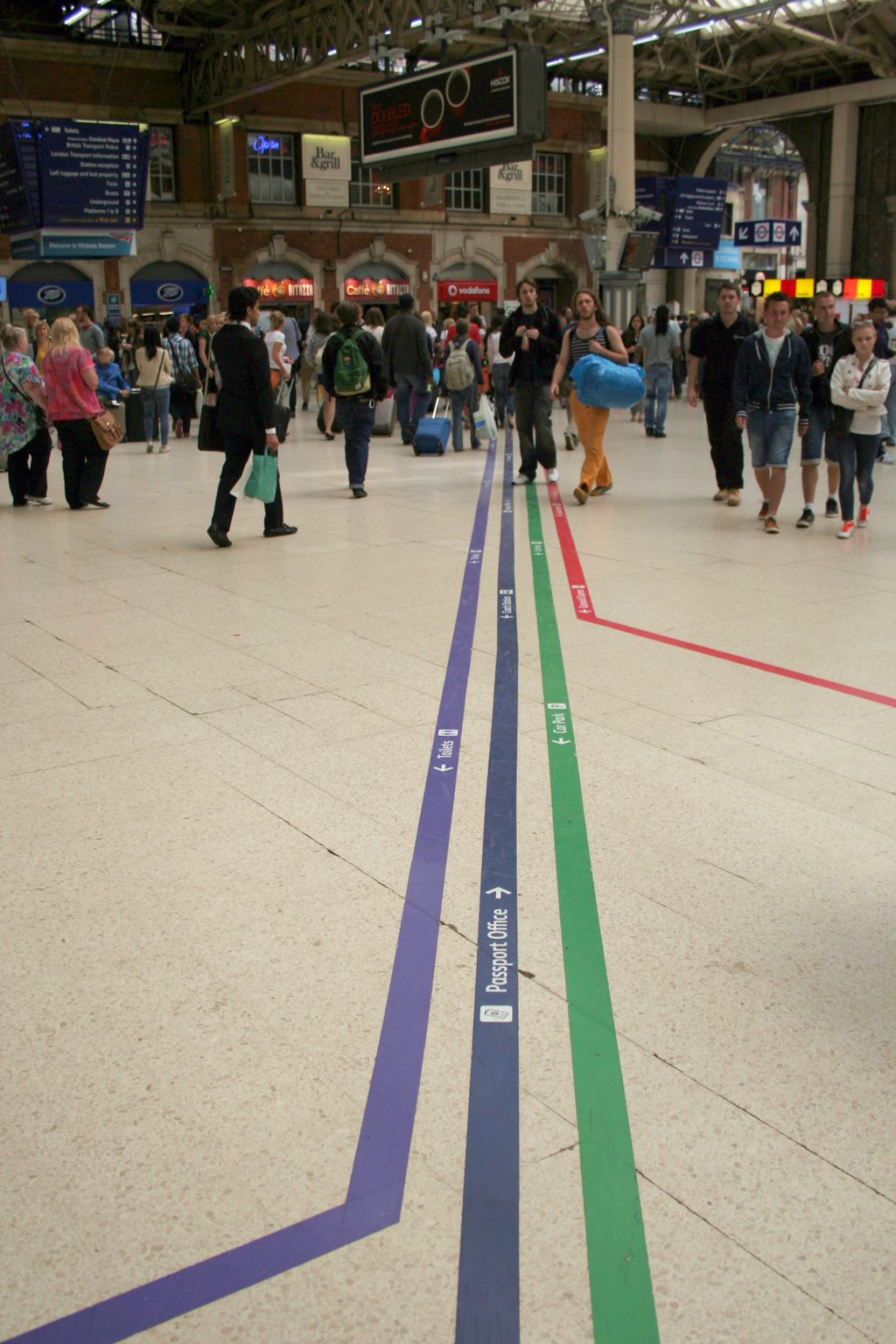
Lines on the floor of the concourse leading to various facilities.

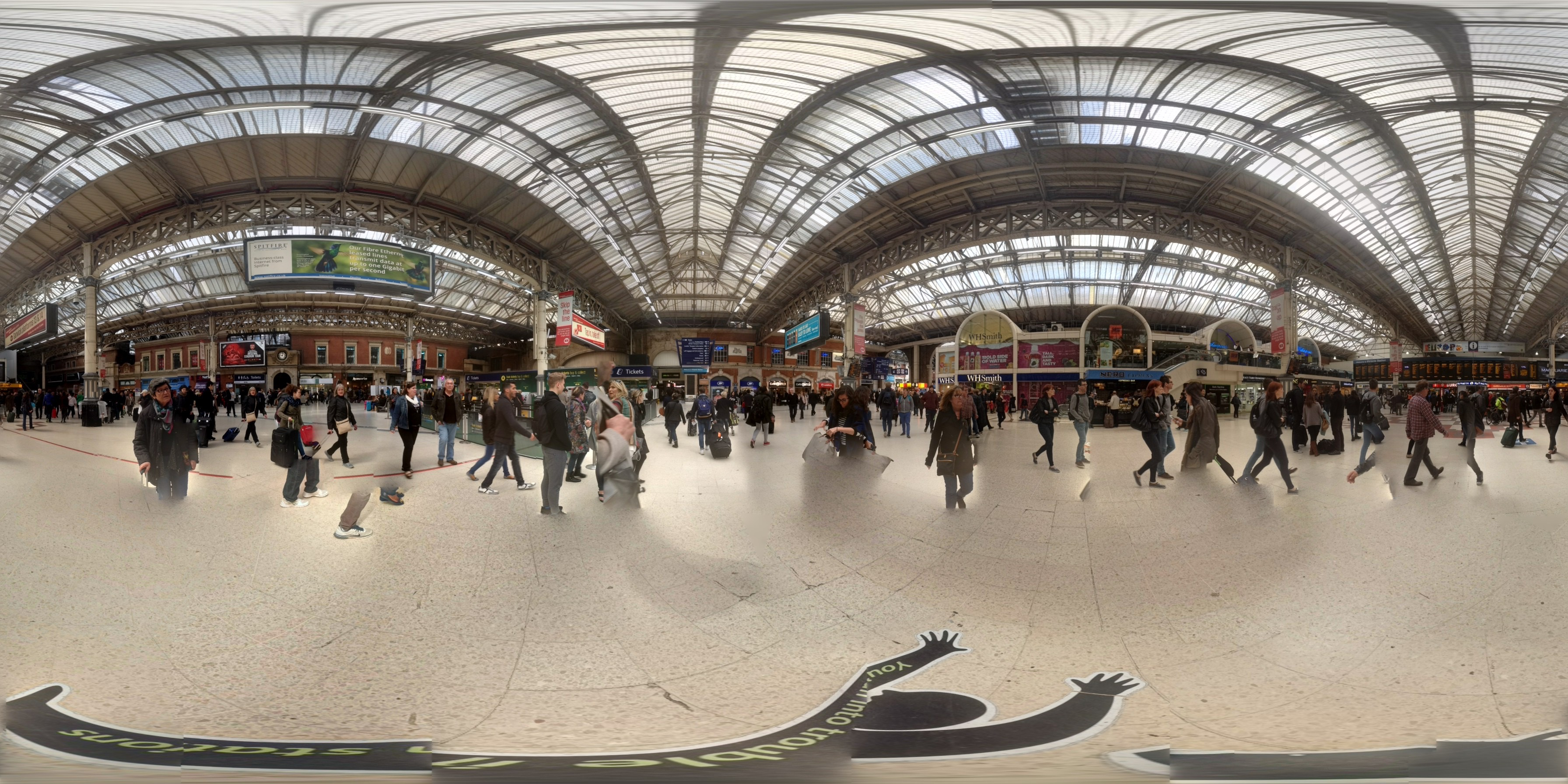
A 360° sphere view of the station concourse

To help passengers choose the correct service, the floor of the main concourse at Victoria was marked with different coloured lines. Passengers could then follow the line marked with the specific colour for that service to arrive at their intended departure point.

=== Southeastern ===
Southeastern services at Victoria use platforms 1–8. The station is served by a mixture of metro and long distance (mainline) services. Metro services are operated using Class 465 and 466 EMUs whilst mainline services are operated using Class 375 and 377 EMUs.

As of December 2024, the typical off-peak service operated by Southeastern in trains per hour (tph) is:

- 4 tph to Orpington via Beckenham Junction
- 2 tph to Gravesend via Bexleyheath
- 1 tph to Ramsgate via Faversham
- 1 tph to Dover Priory via Faversham
- 1 tph to Gillingham via Chatham
- 1 tph to Ashford International via Maidstone East

=== Southern ===
Southern services at Victoria use platforms 9-12 and 15-19 as of August 2022. The station is served by a mixture of metro and long-distance (mainline) services. Southern metro and mainline services are both operated by Class 377 EMUs and Gatwick Express is serviced by Class 387 EMUs.

As of May 2025, the typical off-peak service operated by Southern in trains per hour (tph) is:

- 2 tph to London Bridge via Crystal Palace
- 2 tph to Epsom Downs via Sutton and Norbury
- 2 tph to West Croydon via Crystal Palace
- 2 tph to Dorking via Epsom and Sutton of which 1 continues to Horsham
- 2 tph to East Grinstead via Oxted
- 2 tph to Reigate via Redhill
- 2 tph to Bognor Regis and Portsmouth Harbour, dividing at Horsham
- 2 tph to Littlehampton via Worthing
- 2 tph to Eastbourne via Lewes of which 1 continues to Ore

During the suspension of the Gatwick Express, Southern services at Victoria began to use Platforms 13 and 14 as well as operating the Gatwick Express fleet of Class 387 units. Gatwick Express services were reinstated in March 2022.

=== Gatwick Express ===
Gatwick Express, formerly a separate franchise but now operated by Southern, runs services from platforms 13 and 14. Ticket barriers were installed on these platforms in 2011.

As of September 2022, the typical off-peak service run by Gatwick Express in trains per hour (tph) is:

- 2 tph to Brighton (calling only at Gatwick Airport and Haywards Heath)

In the peak hours, Gatwick Express services call at intermediate stations between Haywards Heath and Brighton such as Preston Park, Hassocks and Burgess Hill.

| Preceding station | National Rail | Following station |
|---|---|---|
| Terminus | Southeastern Greenwich Park Branch Line | Denmark Hill |
| Terminus | Southeastern Chatham Main Line | Bromley South or Denmark Hill |
| Terminus | Southeastern Bromley South Line | Brixton |
| Terminus | Southern Brighton Main Line stopping services | Battersea Park |
| Terminus | Southern Brighton Main Line semi-fast services | Clapham Junction |
| Terminus | Gatwick Express Gatwick Express | Gatwick Airport |
| Terminus | Belmond London-Paris-Venice; March to November | Folkestone West |

== London Underground station ==
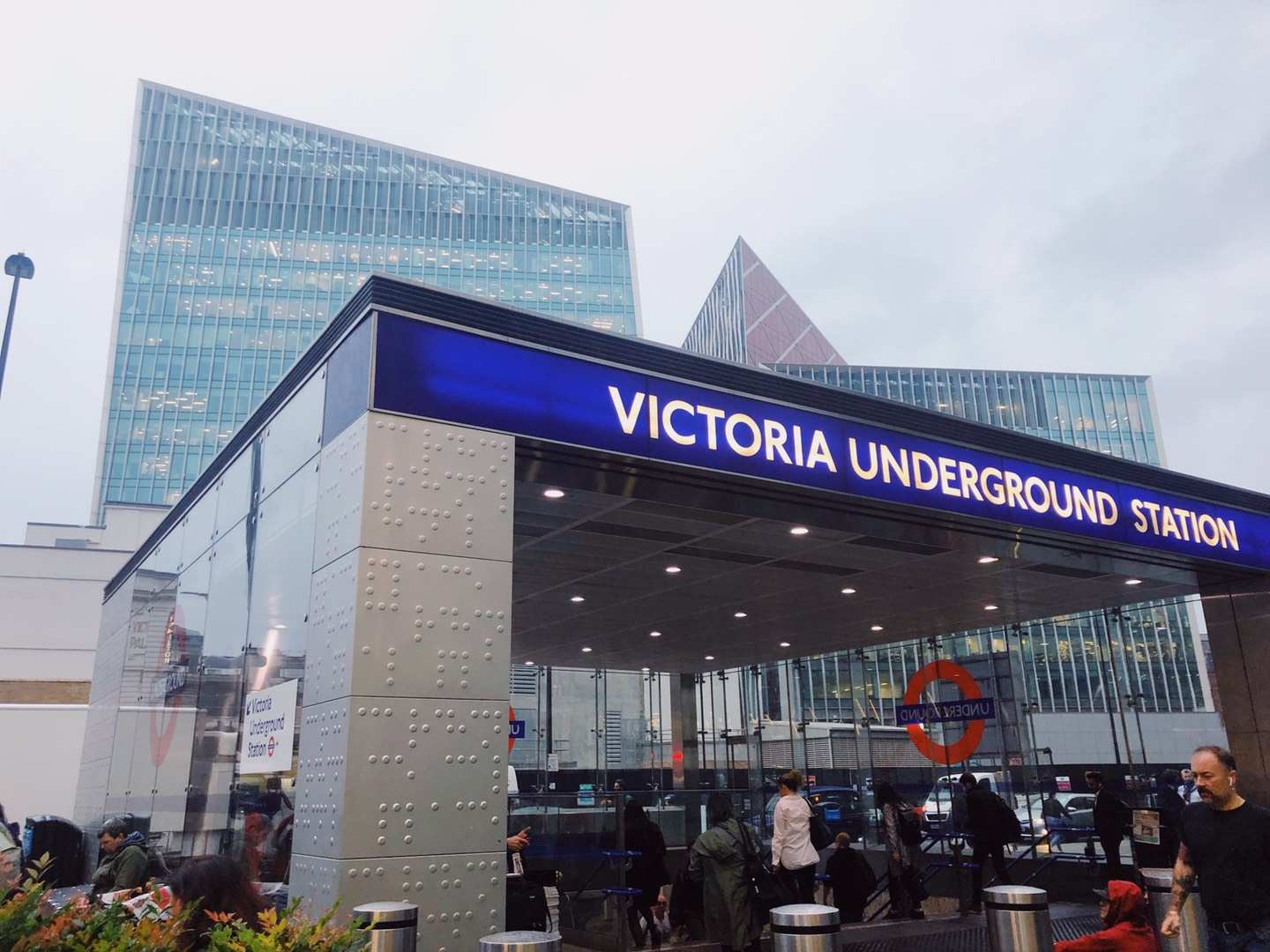
Entrance to the tube station at Cardinal Place

There are two connected Underground stations at Victoria, on different levels and built more than a century apart. The older one, on the north side of the bus station, serves the sub-surface lines Circle and District, constructed by 'cut and cover' methods just below road level. The newer station, closer to the main line station, serves the deep-level tube line, Victoria. Each has its own ticket hall, and the two are connected by a pedestrian passage beneath the bus station.

Victoria is currently the 3rd busiest station on the London Underground with 62.69 million passengers using the station in 2024.

| Preceding station | London Underground | Following station |
|---|---|---|
| Sloane Square towards Edgware Road | Circle line | St James's Park towards Hammersmith via Tower Hill |
| Sloane Square towards Wimbledon, Richmond or Ealing Broadway | District line | St James's Park towards Upminster |
| Pimlico towards Brixton | Victoria line | Green Park towards Walthamstow Central |

== Accidents and incidents ==
On 26 February 1884, an explosion occurred in the cloakroom of the Brighton side injuring seven staff, as part of the Fenian dynamite campaign.

On 27 August 1910, an empty LB&SCR stock train derailed due to inadequate signalling arrangements, leading to four injuries.

On 26 July 1939, as part of the IRA's S-Plan, bombs exploded in the luggage office at King's Cross and then in the cloakroom at Victoria. Five were wounded at Victoria; at King's Cross, one man was killed and 17 people severely wounded.

On 15 September 1940, a German Nazi plane crashed into the station courtyard but there were no deaths. The plane was later displayed at the Imperial war museum.

On 17 July 1946, a light engine collided with a passenger train; several people were injured.

On 15 December 1959, a passenger train collided with a rake of parcels vans. At least eleven people were injured.

On 8 September 1973, a Provisional Irish Republican Army bomb exploded at the ticket office, injuring four people.

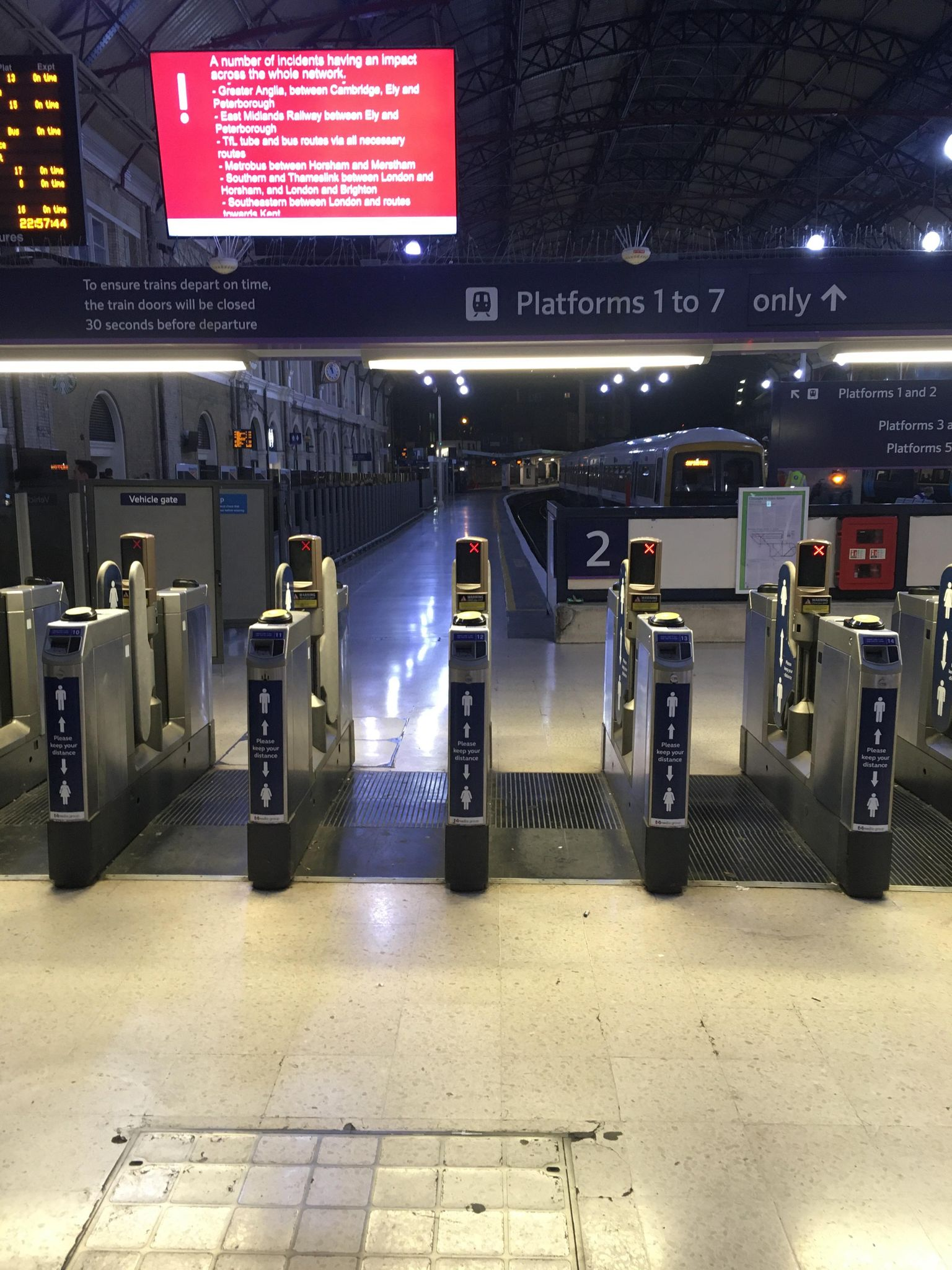
Deborah Linsley was found murdered on an Orpington-Victoria train arriving at this platform on 23 March 1988. The unidentified killer disembarked here and disappeared into the crowd. The high-profile murder remains unsolved as of 2022, despite the killer's DNA being known since 2002 and a £10,000 reward still being on offer.

On the afternoon of 23 March 1988, Deborah Linsley was found brutally stabbed to death on a train arriving at platform 2 at Victoria. She had boarded the Orpington-Victoria service at Petts Wood. A French au pair heard screaming from the compartment next to her on the final leg of the journey between Brixton and Victoria. Several people, including the au pair, reported seeing a suspicious blond or ginger-haired man walking from the train and washing cuts on his face in the toilet of the station, while there were also sightings of a man seen staring at women boarding the train at Orpington and changing compartments at Penge East, possibly into Linsley's compartment. Despite the killer's DNA being known since 2002, the murder remains unsolved as of August 2022. There remains a £10,000 reward on offer for information leading to the capture of the killer.

On 18 February 1991, an IRA bomb exploded in a litter bin, killing David Corner, and injuring 38. A general bomb warning for all main-line stations had been received by telephone at 0700, but the Metropolitan Police Anti-Terrorist Branch chose not to close the stations.

In 2009 a woman was found by a Police Community Support Officer (PCSO) acting suspiciously. When approached she produced a gun and pointed it at a passing young child. Unarmed PCSO George McNaught of the Metropolitan Police wrestled the gun out of the woman's hands before overpowering and detaining her. The woman was arrested and PCSO McNaught was awarded the commendation of the High Sheriff of Greater London for his brave actions. He is the first PCSO to receive the award.

In March 2010, a youth was stabbed to death in Victoria Underground station, in front of numerous witnesses. Eight people were convicted of the killing in 2013. Three defendants were found guilty of murder and five were convicted of manslaughter.

The former British ambassador to the US, Sir Christopher Meyer, said he was attacked on a Tube platform at the station in July 2018. Two teenagers were arrested and then bailed by police. However, a witness subsequently claimed that Meyer was injured after accidentally falling over.

On 8 May 2019, Class 377 electric multiple unit 377 142 collided with the buffer stops.

On 22 March 2020, during the global COVID-19 pandemic, a ticket office worker, Belly Mujinga along with another female staff member, were repeatedly coughed and spat on by a male member of the public, who claimed to have COVID-19. A few days later, both Mujinga and the fellow worker fell ill with the virus. Mujinga had underlying respiratory issues and was eventually admitted to Barnet General Hospital and put on a ventilator. She died on 5 April 2020, aged 47. The police interviewed a 57-year-old man, who tested negative for the virus. No further action was taken as it was discovered that the incident was not a cause of Mujinga's death, as well as senior detectives concluding that "there is no evidence to substantiate any criminal offences having taken place".

== Cultural references ==
Victoria station is mentioned in Oscar Wilde's The Importance of Being Earnest as the location where Jack Worthing was found by Thomas Cardew. In describing this to Lady Bracknell, Jack clarifies he was named because Cardew had a ticket to Worthing, and clarifies this as "the Brighton line" (that is, the LB&SCR station, as opposed to the LC&DR one).

The station is mentioned in the Sherlock Holmes short story "The Final Problem", when Dr Watson catches a Continental Express train from Victoria to avoid Moriarty and his henchmen.

The Harold Pinter short play Victoria Station has the station as the intended destination that the driver never reaches.

== See also ==
- Murder of Deborah Linsley – unsolved murder of a woman that occurred on a train arriving at Victoria in 1988
