= Murder of Kate Bushell =

1997 murder in South West England

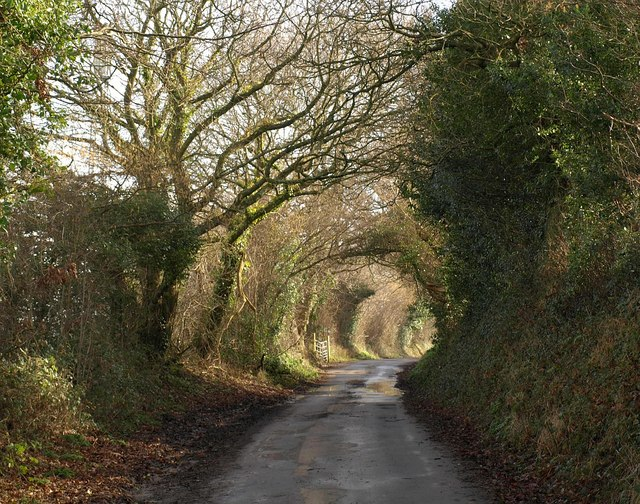
- Exwick Lane, the place of the murder
- Location: 50.728479°N 3.561385°W; Exwick Lane, Exwick, Exeter, Devon
- Date: 15 November 1997
- Attack type: Murder
- Weapon: Knife
- Victim: Kate Bushell
- Perpetrator: Unknown
- Motive: Apparently motiveless

Locations
1 1987 Helen Fleet murder.
2 1997 Kate Bushell murder.
3 1998 Lyn Bryant murder.

On the evening of 15 November 1997, Kate Bushell, a 14-year-old schoolgirl, was found murdered in Exwick, Exeter.

Bushell was found with her throat cut 300 yards (270 m) yards from her home. It was the first of two murders assumed to be connected in the region.

The crime made headline news and received significant coverage in the press and media, and featured on Crimewatch appeals. As of 2025, the case remains unsolved.

== Background ==
Katherine Helen Bushell
- Bushell, c. September 1997
- Born: 11 September 1983; Nottingham, England
- Died: 15 November 1997 (aged 14); Footpath next to Exwick Lane, Exwick, Exeter, Devon, England
- Education: St Thomas High School, Exeter (Now West Exe School)
- Parents: Jerry Bushell (father); Susan Bushell (mother)

Katherine Helen Bushell was born on 11 September 1983 in Nottingham. She lived in Exwick, a suburb on the western edge of Exeter, Devon, and attended St Thomas High School.

== Murder ==
On Saturday 15 November 1997, Bushell set out to walk her neighbours' dog Gemma. She walked up Exwick Lane, a narrow rural lane commonly used by dog walkers and Bushell herself. At 6 p.m., with Bushell having not returned home and it being dark, her mother and father drove up the lane in their car to search for her, and also contacted the police. They then searched the footpaths through the adjacent fields and at 7:30 p.m. her father found Gemma, and then saw that Bushell was lying dead next to her. Her throat had been cut.

Three suspicious figures were reported as being near the scene by witnesses: a vagrant, a man with a blue car parked on Exwick Lane yards from the murder site, and a man seen running from the scene. None of these individuals ever came forward to police, and police would later state that this indicated that they had "something to hide".

Most people in the community knew each other well, so it had been noted in the summer of that year that the vagrant had suddenly appeared in the area. In mid-September, a resident noted the unknown man walking past him as he walked his dog on a lane on the outskirts of Exwick. He was described as wearing a long, checky-brown coat with a big collar that was very tight to his neck, and he had long straggly hair. He was between 5 feet 10 inches (1.78 m) and 6 feet (1.8 m) tall, and between 30 and 40 years of age. The witness said he got the impression the man had been sleeping rough in the area. The man was seen around the area several times by the same witness, and was described as always wearing the same big coat, even when it was hot. On the evening of Wednesday 12 November 1997, as the local resident again walked his dog down the lane, the vagrant suddenly came out from behind the trees and startled him. This was only three days before Bushell's murder, and only half a mile from her home, on a lane which she regularly walked down. On the weekend before Bushell's murder, a neighbour saw an orange or red tent pitched near to the spot Bushell was found killed, and it seemed unusual for someone to be camping on their own outside Exeter in mid-November.

On the day of the murder, Bushell had gone shopping with her mum in Exeter city centre. At 4:30 p.m. she left her house to walk Gemma, her next-door neighbours' dog. At 4:55 p.m., a father and his children who were out walking at the same time passed Bushell as she walked her dog up Exwick Lane. A mother and her daughter driving down the lane at 5:00 p.m. reported passing Bushell and her dog as they drove towards Exwick. They noted that she was looking straight at them, which they thought was unusual, and slightly further up the road they saw a man stood by a small blue van that was parked on the southern side of the lane. It was parked facing away from Exwick, and police believe it may have been a blue Vauxhall Astra van. The witnesses questioned what the man was doing there, and said after they heard of the murder that they felt guilty that they had not gone back to help Bushell in some way. The location this sighting was reported was only 100 yards (91 metres) from where Bushell was found murdered, and it was the last sighting of her alive. The sighting was also made only minutes before Bushell's murder took place. About a quarter of an hour before this sighting was made, two other witnesses had driven down the lane and seen a blue Ford Fiesta parked in the opposite direction, and it was not known whether this was the same vehicle. The man did not come forward and neither he or his vehicle were traced.

Half an hour after Bushell was found dead and half a mile away, a man was seen running from the direction of the lane into Cornflower Hill in Exwick, while the police helicopter was circling above. Police did not know for sure if the sighting of the man was connected, and when Bushell's murder was featured on Crimewatch in January 1998 they appealed for him to come forward. He never did.

Bushell's murder made front-page news nationally, provoking a national outcry, and was described in an appeal on Crimewatch in January 1998 as one of those murder cases that "strike a nervous chord across the nation". As it was a child who was murdered, the case gained a particularly high amount of attention. It was noted on Crimewatch that the murder appeared to be the kind committed by a repeat offender, with viewers being told: "unless a viewer can help now, the killer might not be caught until he strikes again". The lead detective on the case, Mike Stephens, said that all the officers on the inquiry were concerned that the murder may just be the start of the killer's attacks. Bushell's murder featured on Crimewatch again on 22 September 1998, as part of the 'Still Unsolved' programme. At the conclusion of this second Crimewatch appeal, it was asked for any individuals who knew the identity of the killer to come forward before he committed another offence. Almost exactly one month after the appeal, Bryant was killed.

== Initial investigations ==
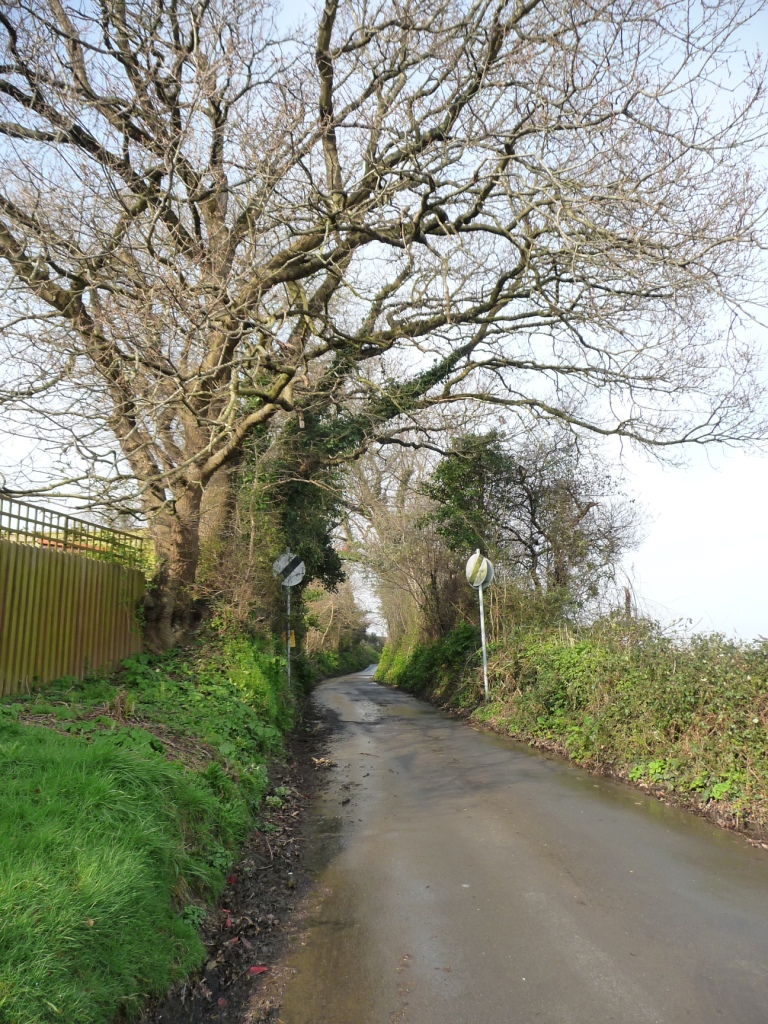
The entrance to Exwick Lane, looking from Exwick.

The police investigating Bushell's murder found a number of man-made dens in the area around where she was found dead. Police appealed for any children or adults who had used those to come forward and eliminate themselves from the inquiry. A black bin-liner was also found which contained an individual's personal effects, and some unidentified fingerprints were found on the bin-liner. On Crimewatch in January 1998, the lead detective Mike Stephens appealed to the community of Exwick directly, saying that someone in the community knew who the perpetrator was and requested that they helped bring him to justice. Despite the high profile of the Bushell case, and the appeal on Crimewatch in January 1998, the killer was not caught quickly. Another appeal was made on Crimewatch's 'Still Unsolved' programme on 22 September 1998, in which Stephens said he was "90% certain" that the killer was a local man or someone who had local knowledge. He also stated that the man was right handed, possibly the owner of a blue vehicle, and may have had prior experience of slaughtering animals, particularly sheep. A psychological profile of the killer was also revealed, which said the killer was likely:

- Aged between 18 and 35
- Someone with previous convictions, possibly for sexual offences
- Someone with sexual and/or relationship difficulties
- Someone who kept pornography
- Someone who may have shown cruelty to animals

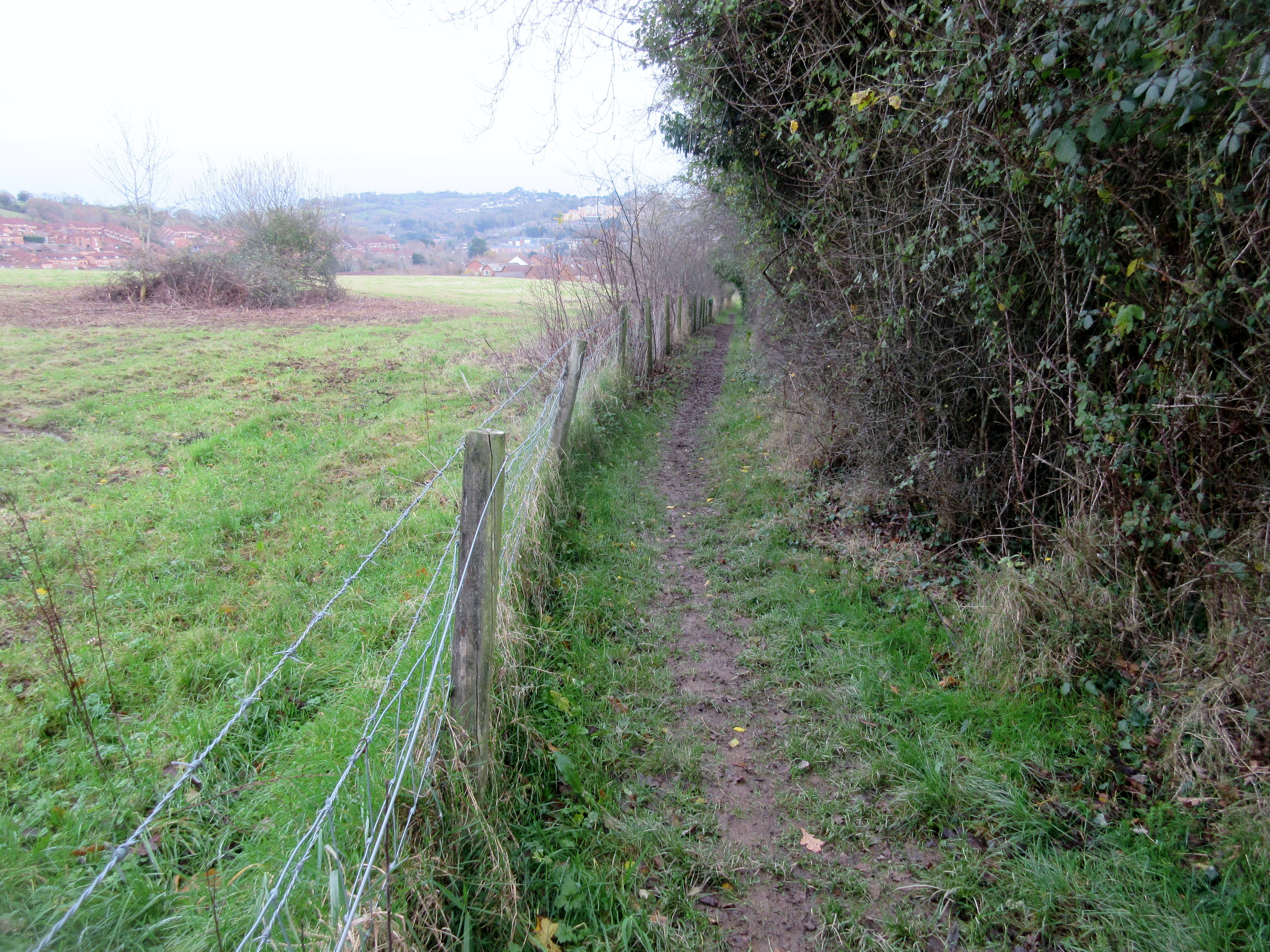
Bushell was found dead with her throat cut on this footpath, about 100 m (110 yd) behind where this image is taken.

Despite the high profile of Bushell's killing and the appeals, none of the three suspicious figures seen in the area of Bushell's murder (the vagrant, the man by the vehicle 100 yards from the murder site, and the man running from the scene) came forward, and Mike Stephens stated in November 1998: "We must question why some of these people have not come forward." Of the man seen by the blue vehicle very close to the scene, he said: "Despite extensive publicity this individual has failed to come forward and may clearly be Kate's killer... we have to conclude after this period of time the individual has something to hide".

== Cold case investigations ==
Despite its high-profile, the case eventually went cold, with the investigation remaining open.

Investigators found that a number of bright orange fibres had been left at or near the scene of Bushell's murder, and police continue to appeal for the public to come forward if they know of anyone who owned such orange clothing at the time. In 2014, it was revealed that these fibres had been contaminated in 1999 with purple fibres from a lab technician when the evidence was examined as part of a forensic review. This led to fears that a prosecution would no longer be possible, but police responded in 2014 by saying that it was still possible as some evidence was unaffected.

Over time, the case has been speculatively linked to a number of known killers. In 2001, the murder was linked to Philip Smith in the press, after he killed three women randomly in Birmingham. It was said that he regularly visited Devon and Cornwall with the fairground he worked for, and had a sister who lived in Exeter. In 2012, possible links between Bushell's murder and serial killer David Burgess (responsible for the Beenham murders) were investigated after it was discovered that he had been released from prison between 1996 and 1998, a time period in which Bushell was killed. No links were found to either of these killers.

New leads were investigated after a 20th anniversary appeal on Bushell's murder in 2017, but they did not lead anywhere. Detectives remained convinced that Bushell's killer had a local connection due to the location of the crime scene, which was an isolated rural spot mainly used as a cut-through and by local dog walkers. Detectives have also highlighted how the killer would have taken a knife with him that day to the scene, showing he set out to cause harm.

Detectives believe that the "most critical" sighting in the Bushell murder is of the man with the blue car 100 yards (91 metres) from the murder site.

There remains a £10,000 reward for information leading to the capture of the killer of Bushell.

On 14 November 2022, Devon and Cornwall Police launched a renewed appeal to the public, appeal for information to find Bushell's killer. A £20,000 reward was offered by the charity Crimestoppers for information which leads to the arrest and conviction of the offender.

== Legacy ==
Bushell's murder case is Devon and Cornwall Police's biggest and most high-profile murder investigation, with the investigation costing more than £1m by 2018.

The murder continues to be heavily featured in the news, and was heavily publicised on the 20-year anniversary of it in 2017.

In 2009, Bushell's case was discussed in detail in a chapter of a book by Vanessa Brown, titled Britain's Ten Most Wanted: The Truth Behind the Most Shocking Unsolved Murders.

The Bushell case was considered to be linked to the murder of Julia Webb, who was murdered while walking her dog in Sandiway in Cheshire on 22 July 1998, but a link was ruled out one month later. That case also remains unsolved.

== See also ==
- Murders of Kate Bushell and Lyn Bryant
- Murder of Lyn Bryant
- List of unsolved murders in the United Kingdom
- Russell murders – similar, and contemporary, random murders of a mother and daughter walking with their dog in Kent in July 1996
- Murders of Eve Stratford and Lynne Weedon – two separate unsolved UK murders from 1975 that have been proven by DNA to have been committed by the same person
- Murders of Jacqueline Ansell-Lamb and Barbara Mayo – two separate unsolved UK murders from 1970 that are believed to have been committed by the same person
- Murders of Janet Brown and Carolanne Jackson – two separate unsolved UK murders from 1995 and 1997 which may be linked
- Murder of Ann Heron – another UK unsolved murder where key witness sightings reported seeing a mysterious blue Vauxhall Astra at the scene

Other UK cold cases where the offender's DNA is known:

- Murder of Deborah Linsley
- Murder of Lindsay Rimer
- Murder of Janet Brown
- Murder of Linda Cook
- Murder of Melanie Hall
- Batman rapist – subject to Britain's longest-running serial rape investigation
