= Murder of Lyn Bryant =

Unsolved 1990s murder in England

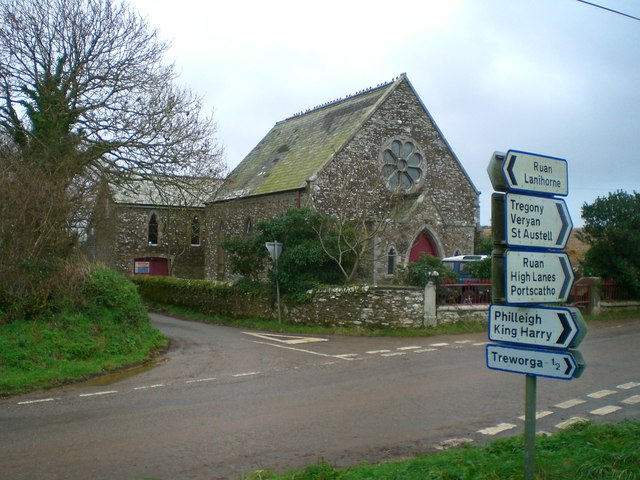
- Ruan Methodist Chapel, the place of the murder
- Location: 50.231795°N 4.941366°W; Ruan Methodist Chapel, Ruan High Lanes, Roseland Peninsula, Cornwall
- Date: 20 October 1998
- Attack type: Murder with a Knife
- Weapon: Knife
- Victim: Linda Bryant
- Perpetrator: Unknown
- Motive: Apparently motiveless

Locations
1 1987 Helen Fleet murder.
2 1997 Kate Bushell murder.
3 1998 Lyn Bryant murder.

On the afternoon of 20 October 1998, Linda "Lyn" Bryant, a 41-year-old woman, was found murdered in Ruan High Lanes, Cornwall.

Bryant was found with her throat stabbed about 100 yards (91 metres) from Ruan Methodist Chapel. It was the second of two murders assumed to be connected in the region.

The crime made headline news and received significant coverage in the press and media, and featured on Crimewatch appeals. As of 2024, the case remains unsolved. It remains one of the United Kingdom's most notorious unsolved murders.

In 2018, it was revealed that a DNA profile had been isolated in the Bryant case, leading to renewed hopes that the perpetrator could be identified.

== Murder ==
Linda Bryant
- Bryant, c. 1998
- Born: 1957
- Died: 20 October 1998 (aged 40–41); Next to Ruan Methodist Chapel, Ruan High Lanes, Roseland Peninsula, Cornwall, England
- Other name: Lyn Bryant

On Tuesday 20 October 1998, Linda Bryant (known as Lyn), a 41-year-old mother-of-two was killed. At 2:30 p.m. she was found by a gate to a field near her home on the Roseland Peninsula in Cornwall, five miles south of Truro, by a holiday-maker driving past. Her dog was found unharmed next to her. She had been stabbed a number of times in her neck and chest and police called the murder "horrendous". She had almost certainly fought with her killer. She had been in contact with her attacker for a considerable amount of time, having been stabbed while standing and also in a horizontal position.

At around lunchtime that day, between about 12:30 and 12:45 p.m., a local woman driving on the nearby road from Truro and St. Mawes noticed a stranger walking down the road who she thought looked "odd". As she passed him in her vehicle, he looked straight at her, and this sighting was later the basis of a photofit. He was 5 ft 10ins, in his early 30s, with a square-ish jaw and dark eyebrows. Bryant drove to Chenoweth's garage at Ruan High Lanes and on the A3078 in her car and arrived at about 1 p.m., where she saw a friend and chatted with her. Whilst they were talking, at about 1:10 p.m., a small, scruffy white van turned into the garage and parked at a strange angle, facing towards Bryant's car. The driver was between 30 and 50 years old, with a round face and a full bushy brown beard flecked with grey. He appeared quite big and seemed to be wearing a waxed green jacket. As soon as Bryant exited the petrol station, the unidentified van followed her out of the garage, which the employees of the garage thought odd. It was later discovered that the van had also been sighted on the Friday and Saturday before the murder, and that it had been sighted parked in the layby beside the chapel where she was found dead. The van was described as either an Austin Maestro, a Ford Escort or a Bedford van.

Bryant returned home but left again at 1:35 p.m. to walk her dog along Ruan High Lanes, which she walked on almost every day. She walked towards the Methodist chapel and then left towards Treworga. Then, between 1:45 and 2:00 p.m., a witness driving past saw Bryant speaking with a man outside the chapel, 100 yards (91 metres) from where she was later found dead. He was described as 5 ft 9ins, in his 30s, and wearing light clothing. A farmer moving his animals at the murder site did not report seeing Bryant at around 2:00 p.m., but she was then found dead at this location shortly after.

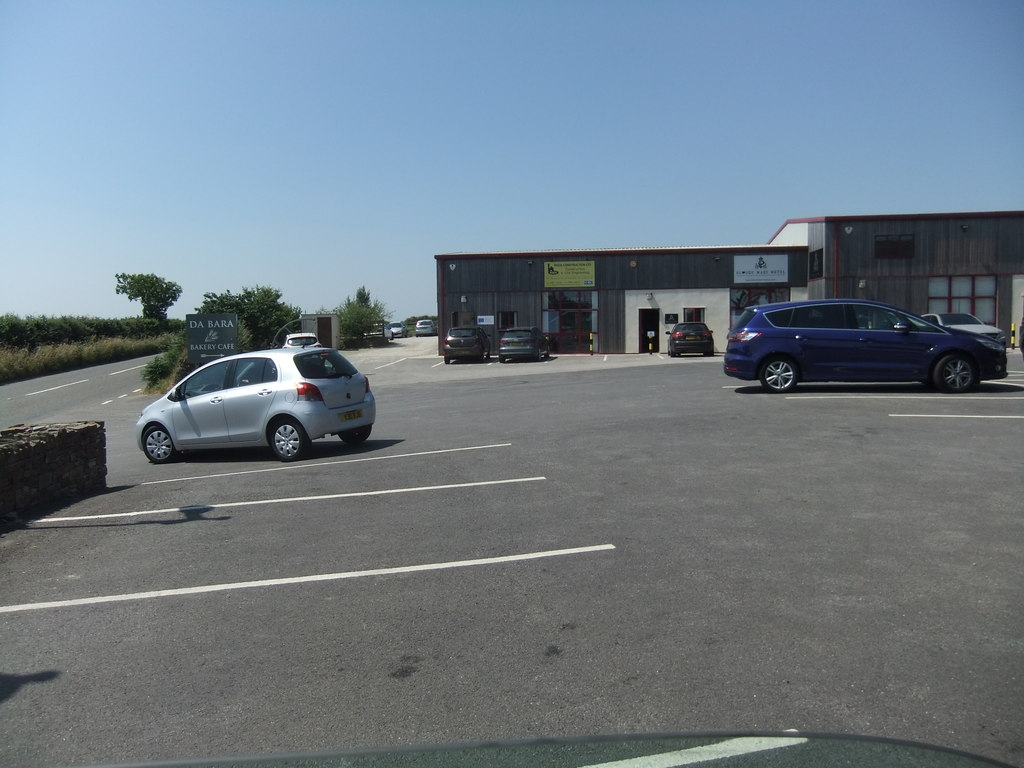
Chenoweth's Garage by the A3078 on the Roseland Peninsula, Cornwall. On the day Bryant was murdered, an unknown man followed Bryant's vehicle out of this garage in a white van.

The possible links between it and a similar murder in the region of Kate Bushell were noted on Crimewatch on 10 November 1998, and the lead detective on the Bryant inquiry, Chris Boarland, said that there were "distinct possibilities that they are linked", although he said that the murder could also have merely been local in character. He also said that they were working closely with the Bushell investigation team. Both victims had been out walking their dogs in the south-west when they were attacked and brutally murdered, apparently without motive. Boarland said "I truly believe that if we don't catch this man there is every possibility that he will strike again". An appeal was made to doctors and psychiatrists who may have had a patient that may have been capable of such a violent crime, indicating that detectives thought the killer may have been mentally ill. It was concluded that the man in the white van was a strong suspect for the crime, and it was said that he did not appear to be local.

Bryant's murder made headline news and was heavily reported on in the press and media. The murder occurred at a time when other high-profile killings were in the news: ongoing at the time was the high-profile trial of Michael Stone for the Russell murders in Chillenden, Kent, and three days after Bryant was murdered, Stone was convicted of the crimes. A mother and her two daughters had been attacked by a man while out walking with their dog.

Bryant's glasses were missing from her body and were not initially found by investigators, which detectives noted on Crimewatch three weeks later.

== Initial investigations ==
Police found nothing in Bryant's background that would lead them to believe that she could be the subject of such an attack. Detectives traced the owners of 8,000 vans similar to the one the suspect was seen driving in the area of Bryant's murder in Devon and Cornwall, but did not find the vehicle, indicating that the driver may have come from outside the area. A criminal profile of the killer in Bryant's case said that he would likely be:

- A loner
- Not in a stable relationship
- Someone who has a hatred of women, which he may have expressed to friends or even psychiatrists

Detectives believed that Bryant did not know her killer. Lead detective Chris Boarland concluded: "This was a planned murder. It was not about Lynda Bryant. This is somebody who was looking for somebody in an isolated location." In both the Bushell and Bryant cases it was ultimately concluded that the motive was sexual, even though neither of the victims had been sexually assaulted. In both cases this was because of the way their clothes had been disturbed by her killer. The murders were described as "pretty unique nationally and internationally".

6,000 people were DNA tested in the first few years of the Bryant investigation, indicating that investigators had DNA evidence.

=== Killer returns to crime scene, glasses found ===
In February 1999, four months after Bryant's murder, it was reported that Bryant's missing glasses had turned up at the scene of her murder, despite the scene having been meticulously searched at the time of the killing and them not having been found. Detectives said they believed that the killer could have returned to the gateway where her body was found and placed her missing spectacles there. They had been found at the scene by a local man and given to the police. One possibility investigated by police was that the killer had returned them to the scene as he wanted to be caught.

== Cold case investigations ==
"All the advice from our profilers was people who kill like this have an offending history. They might be able to go for a while without committing further offences but they won't be able to go indefinitely... where is this person? Are they dead? Are they in prison? I can't believe they are living a normal life. It is a real mystery."

— Chris Boarland, former lead detective, 2014

Despite its high-profile, the case eventually went cold, with the investigation remaining open.

Over time, the case has been speculatively linked to a number of known killers. In 2001, the murder was linked to Philip Smith in the press, after he killed three women randomly in Birmingham. It was said that he regularly visited Devon and Cornwall with the fairground he worked for, and had a sister who lived in Exeter. No links were found to this killer.

In October 2018, it was revealed that a partial DNA profile of the killer of Bryant had been isolated during a 2016 forensic review of the case. Detectives said that it could be used to eliminate suspects quickly, and revealed that they were re-testing some of the 6,000 people who had their DNA tested in the original investigation (the police had to destroy previous DNA evidence they had in 2013 due to a change in the law). It was also announced that three suspects arrested in the initial investigation had now been eliminated forensically. It was also said that three men of interest in the Bryant murder had still not been identified: the scruffy, bearded driver of the white van seen following her out of the garage, the man seen talking to her beside the chapel shortly before she was killed (the last known sighting of her), and a clean-shaven man wearing "normal clothes" who was seen by a farmer walking through a field away from the scene, which the farmer said was very unusual.

There is a £10,000 reward for information leading to the capture of the killer of Bryant.

In October 2023, the 25th anniversary of the murder of Lyn Bryant, police launched a new appeal. Crimestoppers offered a £20,000 reward for information.

== Legacy ==
Bryant's case had cost £2m by 2018. Bryant's murder continues to be heavily featured in the news, and was heavily publicised on the 20-year anniversary of her killing in 2018.

The murder is seen as one of the most notorious murders in Britain, and is seen as a particularly notorious unsolved murder in the West Country.

== See also ==
- Murders of Kate Bushell and Lyn Bryant
- Murder of Kate Bushell
- List of unsolved murders in the United Kingdom
- Russell murders – similar, and contemporary, random murders of a mother and daughter walking with their dog in Kent in July 1996
- Murders of Eve Stratford and Lynne Weedon – two separate unsolved UK murders from 1975 that have been proven by DNA to have been committed by the same person
- Murders of Jacqueline Ansell-Lamb and Barbara Mayo – two separate unsolved UK murders from 1970 that are believed to have been committed by the same person
- Murders of Janet Brown and Carolanne Jackson – two separate unsolved UK murders from 1995 and 1997 which may be linked
- Murder of Ann Heron – another UK unsolved murder where key witness sightings reported seeing a mysterious blue Vauxhall Astra at the scene

Other UK cold cases where the offender's DNA is known:

- Murder of Deborah Linsley
- Murder of Lindsay Rimer
- Murder of Janet Brown
- Murder of Linda Cook
- Murder of Melanie Hall
- Batman rapist – subject to Britain's longest-running serial rape investigation

== Bibliography ==
- Brown, Vanessa (2009). "Chapter 6 - Kate Bushell: Stranger Danger". Britain's Ten Most Wanted: The Truth Behind the Most Shocking Unsolved Murders. John Blake. pp. 147–172. ISBN 978-1-84454-759-3.
