= Murders of Kate Bushell and Lyn Bryant =

1990s murders in England

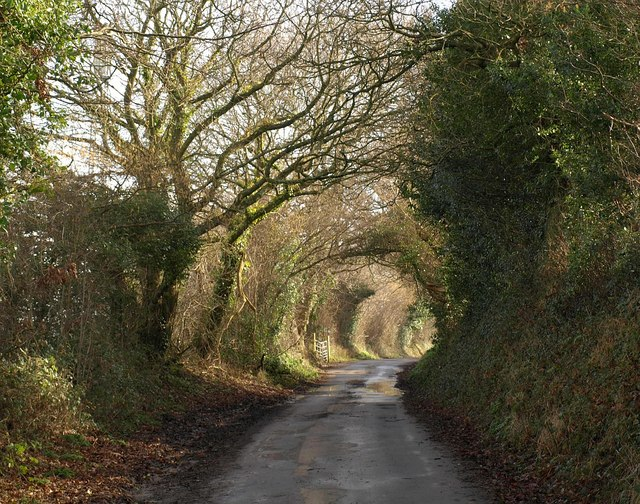

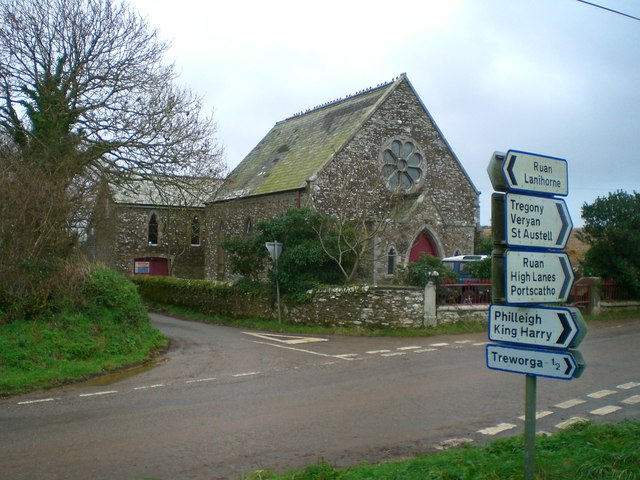
Exwick Lane (left) and Ruan Methodist Chapel
- Location: 50.728479°N 3.561385°W (Bushell); 50.231795°N 4.941366°W (Bryant); Kate Bushell: Exwick Lane, Exwick, Exeter, Devon; Lyn Bryant: Ruan Methodist Chapel, Ruan High Lanes, Roseland Peninsula, Cornwall
- Date: 15 November 1997–20 October 1998
- Attack type: Murder with a Knife
- Weapon: Knife
- Deaths: 2
- Victims: Kate Bushell; Lyn Bryant
- Perpetrator: Unknown
- Motive: Apparently motiveless killings

Locations
1 1987 Helen Fleet murder.
2 1997 Kate Bushell murder.
3 1998 Lyn Bryant murder.

A number of links between the murders of Kate Bushell and the murder of Lyn Bryant have been made, which occurred in 1997 and 1998. The similar circumstances of the murders have led investigators to conclude that there is a high possibility the murders are linked, with both killed with knives while walking dogs along isolated lanes.

In 1997 Bushell was found with her throat cut 300 yards (270 metres) from her home. Bryant was stabbed a number of times; her killer had apparently returned to the scene four months later to place her missing glasses back at the site. The apparent motivelessness of the killings, as well as their particularly brutal nature and apparent links, led to fears that a serial killer was at large in the south-west at the time.

In 2018, it was revealed that a DNA profile had been isolated in the Bryant case, leading to renewed hopes that the perpetrator could be identified. There has been speculation that the murders could be linked to the similarly apparent motiveless killing of 66-year-old Helen Fleet, who was also walking her dog in Weston-super-Mare in 1987. If the perpetrator had killed all three victims, he would be an unidentified serial killer. (Note: A serial killer is most commonly defined as a person who kills three or more people for psychological gratification; reliable sources over the years agree. See, for example: "Serial killer". Segen's Medical Dictionary. 2012. Archived from the original on 11 August 2016 – via TheFreeDictionary.com. "A person who murders 3+ people over a period of > 30 days, with an inactive period between each murder, and whose motivation for killing is largely based on psychological gratification."; Holmes, Ronald M.; Holmes, Stephen T. (1998). Serial Murder (Second ed.). Sage. ISBN 978-0-7619-1367-2. Archived from the original on 14 May 2019. "Serial murder is the killing of three or more people over a period of more than 30 days, with a significant cooling-off period between the murders The baseline number of three victims appears to be most common among those who are the academic authorities in the field. The time frame also appears to be an agreed-upon component of the definition."; Petherick, Wayne (2005). Serial Crime: Theoretical and Practical Issues in Behavioral Profiling. Elsevier. p. 190. ISBN 9780080468549. Archived from the original on 2 September 2016. "Three killings seem to be required in the most popular operational definition of serial killing since they are enough to provide a pattern within the killings without being overly restrictive."; Flowers, R. Barri (2012). The Dynamics of Murder: Kill or Be Killed. CRC Press. p. 195. ISBN 9781439879740. Archived from the original on 1 September 2016. "In general, most experts on serial murder require that a minimum of three murders be committed at different times and usually different places for a person to qualify as a serial killer."; Schechter, Harold (2012). The A to Z Encyclopedia of Serial Killers. Simon & Schuster. p. 73. ISBN 9781439138854. Archived from the original on 1 September 2016. "Most experts seem to agree, however, that to qualify as a serial killer, an individual has to slay a minimum of three unrelated victims.")

Both crimes made headline news and received significant coverage in the press and media, and both cases having featured on Crimewatch appeals. As of 2025, the cases remain unsolved. They remain some of the United Kingdom's most notorious unsolved murders.

== Murder inquiries ==
=== 'Serial killer' fears ===
In early January 1999 a knife attack on a mother and her daughter in the area prompted fears of a serial killer being at large in the area, and that he was stalking women in the area. A man with a knife had deliberately driven his car into a 17-year-old girl and then drove her and her mother into a nearby field where they fought their way out of his car while he lashed out and slashed the mother's hands. The attack happened while they walked their dog in a country lane in Netherton, near Newton Abbot, Devon, and Devon and Cornwall police said the similarities between the incident and the two murders were "too obvious to ignore". The man had driven past them on the lane in a blue-grey Vauxhall Cavalier saloon, before coming up behind them again at slow speed several minutes later, before deliberately driving into the daughter's legs. The driver got out and held a knife to the girl's throat, saying he would cut her unless they did as he ordered.

The man matched the descriptions of the suspects in the two murders, described as white, 35 to 40, and of medium height. He was 5 ft 8ins tall and well-built, with short fair hair and with a roundish face.

In late January, there was another attack on a woman out walking her dog, 15 miles from the scene of Bryant's murder, and police also investigated whether her attack was linked to the murders. She had been attacked in a lane near Camborne, Cornwall, by a man driving a black vehicle. He was described as large, between 30 and 40, with light hair and wearing dark trousers and a light top.

=== Possible further attack ===
On 2 July 2000, there was an incident in which a woman was stalked for more than 300 yards by a man carrying a six-inch knife in Salcombe, Devon. Occurring at 7:30 p.m., her Alsatian dog barked at the man and he ran off. Detectives investigated whether the incident was linked to the murders. The man was white with a suntan, about 40 and clean shaven. He had got out of a dark blue Volvo car and was wearing green corduroy trousers and a blue sweatshirt.

== Lasting notoriety ==
Bushell's murder case is Devon and Cornwall Police's biggest and most high-profile murder investigation, with the investigation costing more than £1m by 2018. Bryant's case, meanwhile, had cost £2m by 2018. Both Bushell and Bryant's murders continue to be heavily featured in the news, and were heavily publicised on the 20-year anniversary of their killings in 2017 and 2018. Bushell and Bryant's murders are seen as some of the most notorious murders in Britain, and are seen as particularly notorious unsolved murders in the West Country.

In 2009, Bushell's case was discussed in detail in a chapter of a book by Vanessa Brown, titled Britain's Ten Most Wanted: The Truth Behind the Most Shocking Unsolved Murders.

The possible links between Bushell and Bryant's murders continue to be noted in the press and media, and in 2018, retired detective Chris Clark claimed that the two murders could be linked to the murder of 66-year-old Helen Fleet in Worlebury Woods, in Weston-super-Mare, in March 1987. She had also been randomly killed while out walking her dog, which was also left unharmed, and was not sexually assaulted or robbed. Clark claimed that there was a similar sighting of a pale van nearby.

The Bushell case was considered to be linked to the murder of Julia Webb, who was murdered while walking her dog in Sandiway in Cheshire on 22 July 1998, but a link was ruled out one month later. That case also remains unsolved.

== See also ==
- List of unsolved murders in the United Kingdom
- Russell murders – similar, and contemporary, random murders of a mother and daughter walking with their dog in Kent in July 1996
- Murders of Eve Stratford and Lynne Weedon – two separate unsolved UK murders from 1975 that have been proven by DNA to have been committed by the same person
- Murders of Jacqueline Ansell-Lamb and Barbara Mayo – two separate unsolved UK murders from 1970 that are believed to have been committed by the same person
- Murders of Janet Brown and Carolanne Jackson – two separate unsolved UK murders from 1995 and 1997 which may be linked
- Murder of Ann Heron – another UK unsolved murder where key witness sightings reported seeing a mysterious blue Vauxhall Astra at the scene

Other UK cold cases where the offender's DNA is known:

- Murder of Deborah Linsley
- Murder of Lindsay Rimer
- Murder of Janet Brown
- Murder of Linda Cook
- Murder of Melanie Hall
- Batman rapist – subject to Britain's longest-running serial rape investigation
