= Murder of Helen Fleet =

1987 murder in Weston-super-Mare, Somerset, England

- Fleet walking her two dogs in the woods at Worlebury Hill in early 1987.
- Location: Weston-super-Mare, Somerset, England
- Date: 28 March 1987
- Attack type: Homicide by stabbing and strangulation
- Victims: Helen Fleet, aged 66
- Perpetrator: Unknown
- Motive: Unknown

Locations
1 1987 Helen Fleet murder.
2 1997 Kate Bushell murder.
3 1998 Lyn Bryant murder.

Helen Fleet was a woman who was murdered in Weston-super-Mare, Somerset, England, on 28 March 1987. She was discovered stabbed, beaten, and strangled in the woods at Worlebury Hill, where she had been walking her two dogs. Her murder remains unsolved.

== Background ==
Helen Fleet was born in Stoke-on-Trent, Staffordshire in about 1921, and lived in Crewe, Cheshire until the age of 18. During World War II, she joined the Auxiliary Territorial Service, where she trained as a lorry driver, before transferring to the Women's Auxiliary Air Force. She went on to have a career for an Oxfordshire engineering firm. Her first marriage ended in divorce and she was widowed from her second marriage in about 1967.

After a period of living with her mother and widowed sister in Wales, Fleet and her sister moved to Weston-super-Mare around 1983 after their mother died. At the time of her death, Fleet, 66, was living with her sister, Betty Brough, 60, at 38 Osborne Road, Weston-super-Mare.

== The murder ==
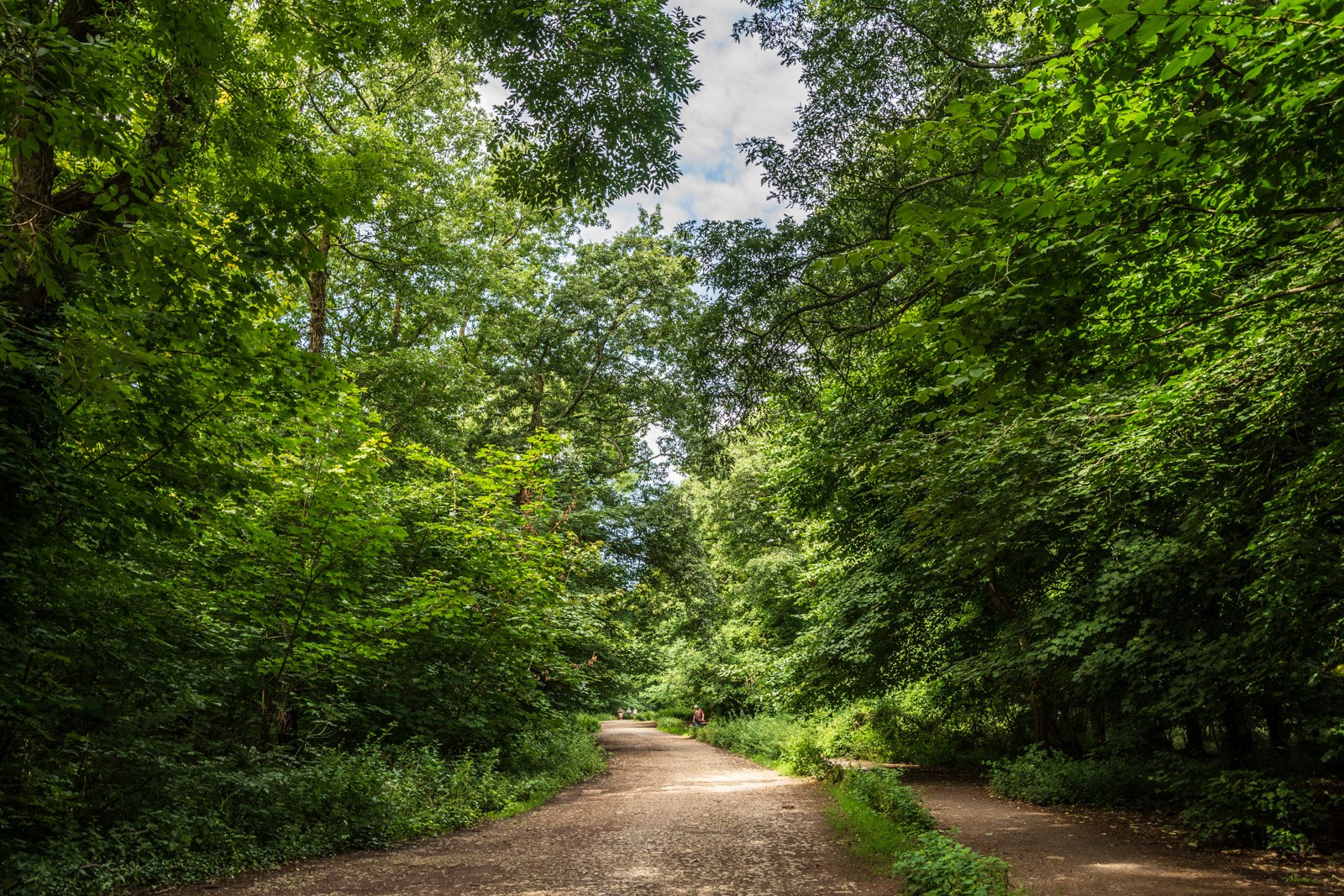
The murder took place in the woods at Worlebury Hill.

On the morning of 28 March 1987, Fleet dropped her sister off to go shopping, then called in at a bakery and petrol station, before heading to Worlebury Hill to walk her two dogs. Fleet usually walked her dogs in the woods twice a day along a certain route of about a mile. She was last seen alive at 10:50am, after parking her car along Worlebury Hill Road.

The murder took place sometime between 12:20pm and 12:40pm, with three people subsequently reporting hearing a series of screams around 12:20pm. Fleet was stabbed with a knife ten times, beaten around the head and body, and strangled in what was described by Avon and Somerset Police as a "motiveless, vicious attack on a frail old lady". The murder took place in the section of woodland between Worlebury Hill Road and Upper Bristol Road, approximately 200 yards from houses and a bus stop.

At 12:40pm, Fleet's body was discovered by Sylvia Lewis, a fellow dog owner and acquaintance of Fleet, who also frequently walked her dogs in the area. She found Fleet's two dogs barking and running loose in the vicinity of the body. Upon discovering Fleet, Lewis ran to a nearby house on Worlebury Hill Road and alerted David and Hazel Davies that her "friend had collapsed". The Davies followed Lewis into the woods and, after determining that Fleet was dead, Hazel Davies returned to her house to alert the authorities.

A post-mortem examination concluded that Fleet died from manual strangulation and stab wounds. The clothing on her body was found to be disarranged, but police subsequently ruled out sexual assault and robbery.

== Police investigation ==
=== Initial response and inquiries ===
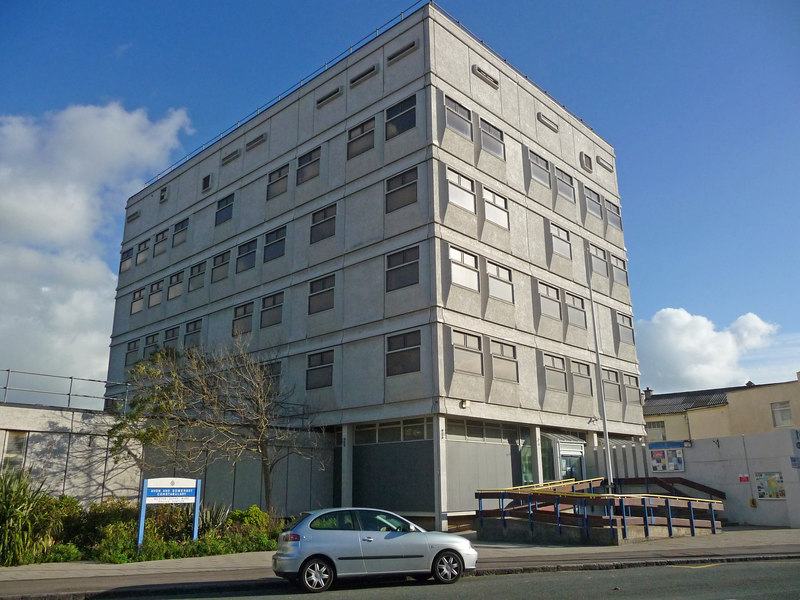
An incident room was established in the now-demolished Weston-super-Mare police station at Walliscote Road, seen here in 2011.

Avon and Somerset Police immediately set up an incident room at Weston-super-Mare police station and a mobile headquarters at Worlebury Hill. A task force of approximately 120 officers were assigned to the case and carried out an examination of the murder scene, while house-to-house enquiries and vehicle checks were made in the surrounding residential areas. The murder weapon, believed to have been a small-bladed knife, was never found. By the end of March 1987, police had taken approximately 70 statements, received 70 phone calls from members of the public, and had followed up 200 lines of inquiry.

On 31 March 1987, police put up 500 posters in Weston-super-Mare and Worlebury Hill in the hope it would lead to further members of the public coming forward with information. On 4 April 1987, 50 police officers returned to the crime scene to speak to walkers, joggers and horse riders looking for leads. By this time, police had received over 240 calls with information and had taken numerous statements, but were not any closer to catching the killer. By 6 April 1987, the police, who had 80 officers assigned to the case, had taken 349 statements.

On 6 April 1987, the police issued the descriptions of three individuals they wished to interview and eliminate from their inquiries. One was a boy, aged 15 to 18, who was seen wearing a "distinctive" ski jacket and was walking alone in the direction of the water tower at 11:30am. The second was a man in his early twenties seen running along nearby Ashbury Drive, sometime between 11:30am and 12:30pm, and the third was a boy, about 12 years of age, who was seen on the morning of the murder in the woods carving into a piece of wood with a small knife near the water tower at 10:15am. The 12-year-old boy was subsequently interviewed and ruled out of the investigation.

On 11 April 1987, a murder reconstruction took place in the attempt to bring forward further leads. A female police constable re-enacted the final two hours of Fleet's life by driving in Fleet's car from her home in Osborne Road with her two dogs to walk them in the woods at Worlebury Hill. While walking the dogs along the usual route Fleet took, police questioned any passersby in the area.

=== Potential hoax caller ===
On 12 April 1987, the police received a phone call from a woman who claimed to live within two miles of the murder scene and suspected a close relative of committing the murder. She subsequently phoned a further three times over the following week, but refused to give her identity out of fear for her safety and would ring off before being questioned in detail. In her final call, she claimed the relative had confessed to the murder over "some row over dogs". The police initially believed the caller was likely to be genuine, but later determined it was probably a hoax after the caller failed to appear at the police station as promised and never phoned again. After three weeks of silence, police publicly released an edited recording of her last call in the bid to identify her. It was broadcast on both TV and radio on 6 May 1987, and resulted in several calls.

=== Reports on youths of interest ===
By 27 April 1987, there were still 70 officers assigned to the case, although there were no new leads. The police remained interested in speaking to the individual in the "distinctive" ski jacket and the young man seen running in Ashbury Drive. A potential second youth wearing a different ski jacket was reported to have been seen running out of the woods in the direction of Worlebury Golf Club around 12:45pm. A youth wearing a ski jacket was reported by at least two witnesses running from the vicinity of the murder scene shortly before the body was discovered. A witness on a stationary bus, only 50 yards from the murder scene, also reported seeing a youth walking past wearing what they described as an anorak. Police believed the young man running down Ashbury Drive may have been the same individual who was seen running down Farm Road, carrying a yellow hard hat or crash helmet.

1987 police photofit of the youth seen talking to Fleet two days before her murder.

Six weeks into the investigation, police received new information from a man about a youth, aged 16 or 17, who he saw chatting with Fleet at Worlebury Hill on 26 March 1987 at 4:10pm, two days before the murder. Police released a photofit of the youth on 5 May. Police believed that he was possibly one of the same youths seen running from the scene on the day of the murder as his description was similar. The photofit resulted in 12 calls over the next couple of days with possible identities.

=== Crimewatch appeal and response ===
By 21 April 1987, the police decided to appeal for information through the BBC television programme Crimewatch. A re-enactment of Fleet's movements on the day of her murder was filmed over the course of three days in May 1987 using actors, with actress Sylvia Marriott portraying Fleet. Prior to them being rehomed together, Fleet's two dogs also took part in the re-enactment. The film was included in the Crimewatch episode broadcast on 21 May 1987.

One call received after the broadcast was from a man who claimed he knew who the killer was, but he failed to identify himself and rang off. Another said he believed he was the youth seen talking to Fleet two days before her murder, but he also rang off before he could be questioned further. On 28 May 1987, police publicly released the name given by the youth as Keith Spears, which did not match any of the names received from the public based on the photofit. The police were not able to trace the youth and he did not contact them again.

=== Later leads ===
By August 1987, 1,156 statements had been taken, 2,873 houses visited in the town and 5,300 people interviewed. With the police no closer to catching the killer, only one detective sergeant and two detective constables remained working on the case.

On 13 September 1987, the police received a call from a man who claimed he knew someone called Steve who was in the woods on the day of the murder and had "struck an old woman in Worlebury Woods on the day of the murder". The unidentified caller rung off before further questioning.

On 14 April 1988, HTV broadcast an episode of Police 5 on which officers from Avon and Somerset Police reminded the public about the facts of the case in a bid to receive new leads. The broadcast resulted in police following up ten calls the following day.

A year after the crime, police estimated that approximately 40 people who were in the vicinity of the crime scene had not been traced. Three officers continued to be assigned to the case and suspects arrested for related crimes were still being questioned about the murder. A report from a forensic psychiatrist concluded the killer was probably aged between 17 and 24 with sexual problems, and police were aware of five individuals matching that age range who were seen at the scene between the time Fleet was last seen alive and the time her body was found.

== Developments in later years ==
In October 1997, Fleet's murder was one of 17 unsolved murder cases from the previous 30 years to be re-examined by Avon and Somerset Police. Numerous pieces of evidence from the original inquiries, including clothing, blood samples and fingerprints, were reanalysed using the latest techniques in forensic testing and DNA analysis.

In 2000, another reconstruction of Fleet's murder was broadcast on HTV's Crimestoppers and resulted in a new witness, who claimed he had seen Fleet talking to a youth, who was playing with her two dogs, on the day of the murder. The witness believed the pair "knew each other and were talking quite openly". Police believed the killer was most likely a "local boy who had a good knowledge of Worlebury Woods".

In March 2017, on the 30th anniversary of the murder, Avon and Somerset Police made a new appeal for anyone with information to come forward. The police carried out further DNA analysis on remaining evidence and received a number of calls with new leads, some of which provided names, but no further developments in the investigation were announced.

There has been speculation that Fleet's murder may be linked to the similarly apparently motiveless killings of the 14-year-old schoolgirl Kate Bushell at Exwick, Devon, in 1997, and 41-year-old woman Lyn Bryant at Ruan High Lanes, Cornwall, in 1998. In 2018, retired police intelligence officer Chris Clark noted the similarities between the three cases, although they have never been officially linked by police.
