= Murders of Jacqueline Ansell-Lamb and Barbara Mayo =

British murder victims

Jacqueline Ansell-Lamb Barbara Mayo
- Ansell-Lamb (left) and Mayo, c. 1970
- Born: 21 September 1951 (Ansell-Lamb); 20 March 1946 (Mayo)
- Died: Ansell-Lamb: 8 March 1970 (aged 18); Mayo: 12 October 1970 (aged 24)
- Cause of death: Strangulation
- Body discovered: Mere, Cheshire (Ansell-Lamb); Ault Hucknall, Derbyshire (Mayo)
- Known for: Victims of unsolved murder

Jacqueline Susan Ansell-Lamb (21 September 1951 – 8 March 1970) and Barbara Janet Mayo (20 March 1946 – 12 October 1970) were two young women who were murdered in separate incidents in 1970. Both women were last seen hitch-hiking along motorways in England, and both were sexually assaulted before being strangled to death.

Although the murders occurred seven months apart and a considerable distance from each other, investigators suspect both murders were committed by the same perpetrator. Links between the two murders are often erroneously reported to have been proven via DNA testing, and although detectives announced in 1990 that the women's murders were likely linked, a DNA profile was not isolated in either case until 1997, and only in the case of Mayo.

Despite numerous public appeals for information and reconstructions, both murders remain unsolved. The perpetrator(s) of the murders of Ansell-Lamb and Mayo is sometimes referred to as the Monster of the Motorway or the Motorway Monster.

== Murders ==
=== Jacqueline Susan Ansell-Lamb ===
Jacqueline "Jacqi" Ansell-Lamb was an 18-year-old secretary who worked in Manchester, and who was described as "very much a 60s teenager". On the weekend of 7–8 March 1970, she had spent time collecting belongings from her old house in London and had attended a party in Earl's Court, where she met a young man. On Sunday, 8 March 1970, she attempted to hitch-hike back to Manchester from London. She had been given a lift by the man she had met at Earl's Court to one of the slip roads of the M1 motorway in London, where she intended to hitch a lift northwards. She then shared a lift with another man 50 miles up the M1 to Buckinghamshire. How she travelled further north from there was not known. Ansell-Lamb was reported missing on 9 March when she did not turn up in Manchester. On the day she disappeared, she was wearing a blonde wig, false eyelashes, a dark blue coat and maroon shoes. She was carrying a Japan Airlines bag because the initials of the company were the same as hers.

The last place Ansell-Lamb was positively seen was at a transport café named the Opera Café at High Legh, just off Junction 20 of the M6 motorway near Warrington in Cheshire. Between 9 pm and 10 pm she was seen in the café in the company of a man. A number of witnesses sighted her there including a chef, Delia Brown, who said that a man came through the door, went up to Ansell-Lamb and then came to order two coffees. Brown said that she then saw him sitting with her talking. The man was described as smartly dressed in "business-like" clothing. The pair left together and she got into the man's car. It is believed the car may have been a white Jaguar. A final unconfirmed sighting of Ansell-Lamb put her thumbing for a lift on the A556 road, one mile from where her body was found.

On 14 March, the partially clothed body of Ansell-Lamb was found by a ten-year-old boy and his father as they walked through woodland in Mere, Cheshire, just off the M6 motorway, near the café she was last seen at. She had been sexually assaulted and strangled. Her body had been posed. She had bruises and cuts on her neck and face which indicated she had fought with her attacker.

=== Barbara Janet Mayo ===
Barbara Mayo was a 24-year-old schoolteacher who lived in Hammersmith, London.

On 12 October 1970 she set off to hitch-hike to Catterick, North Yorkshire to pick up her boyfriend's car, which had broken down there. She did not turn up and two days after she left London her boyfriend reported her missing. She was last seen wearing a navy-blue coat, lilac jersey and gold and tan slacks. She was thought to have been carrying her red bag with her.

Four days later, a family out walking in an isolated wood just off the M1 motorway at Ault Hucknall near Chesterfield, Derbyshire discovered her partially clothed body under a pile of leaves. She had been raped, battered around the head and strangled to death with a length of flex. She was found next to a lovers' lane named Hodmire Lane. Despite a detailed search, her bag containing her purse was not recovered and was never found. The postmortem was by Home Office pathologist Allan Usher. Two police officers closed off access to the wood. On Tuesday 20 October, the police looked for a white Vauxhall Viva, and Barbara's body was officially identified, by her sister Marjorie, of Taplow. 50 police investigated. The body was fully clothed.

Scotland Yard Chief St Charles Palmer, on Friday 13 November 1970, said 'There is someone on the M1 looking for girls - and none of the youngsters using it are safe until this man is found'. He said that hitchhiking was a pastime with students. A lone girl waited for 2 minutes, two girls waited for ten minutes, but one male waited for up to 4 hours. He believed that Barbara had been picked up at Watford Gap services.

The investigation was under the head of Derbyshire CID Detective Superintendent Ernest Bradshaw, and assistant chief constable L T Bowers, and Det Chief Superintendent Charles Palmer, and Det Sgt Michael Purchase of Scotland Yard. By Tuesday 20 October, Cheshire Police had noticed a similarity with the murder on 8 May. Det Sup Walter Arden of Cheshire Police Support Group, at Stockport, visited the scene.

Barbara lived at 40 Rockley Rd, in Shepherds Bush. She taught part-time in Hammersmith. She was wearing orange trousers, with an orange pullover, being 5 ft 10. Her boyfriend was David Pollard, an electrical designer. She had been possibly seen at Trowell services, as some staff remembered her 'snazzy trousers'. She had planned to travel along the M1, M18 and A1. Cafeteria staff and the manager of the service station, and a petrol attendant, recognised the picture, and said that she had got into a car around 3-4pm on Tuesday night. Philip Leech, deputy manager of Trowell services, said 'Girls are hitchhiking along the M1 all the time. We think it is dangerous'. Barney Labanyi, the manager of Trowell services in 1971, said that there were too many female hitchhikers at Trowell, and he had to call police when some were a nuisance.

On Monday 26 October 1970, Palmer brought 120 miles of the M1, from Scratchwood to Chesterfield, to a stop, and every vehicle at every junction and service station was stopped for 3 and a half hours from 11.30am. Every driver was questioned. No warning was given. The technique is called dragnet (policing). The headquarters of the investigation was at New Beetwell Street, Chesterfield.

On Monday 2 November 1970, a policewoman wore Barbara's clothes and followed her route up the M1. The policewoman, chosen for her resemblance to Barbara and given cosmetics by the BBC make up department, met Barbara's boyfriend in Barbara's flat in London, who was visibly startled. Some newspapers described it as 'Barbara's ghost'.

On Monday 23 November 1970, police stopped every vehicle on the M1 Heath Interchange. On Monday 30 November 1970, police questioned all motorists over for four hours on the Nuthall Interchange. In August 1971, Scotland Yard took its last two officers off the case, but 400 local police were still on the case. 50 police were on the case on October 11, 1971.

The media dubbed the killer of Mayo the "Monster of the Motorway" or the "Motorway Monster". The murder became infamous, and was later described by investigating officers as being "well and truly ingrained into local folklore".

== Police investigations ==
=== Initial inquiries ===
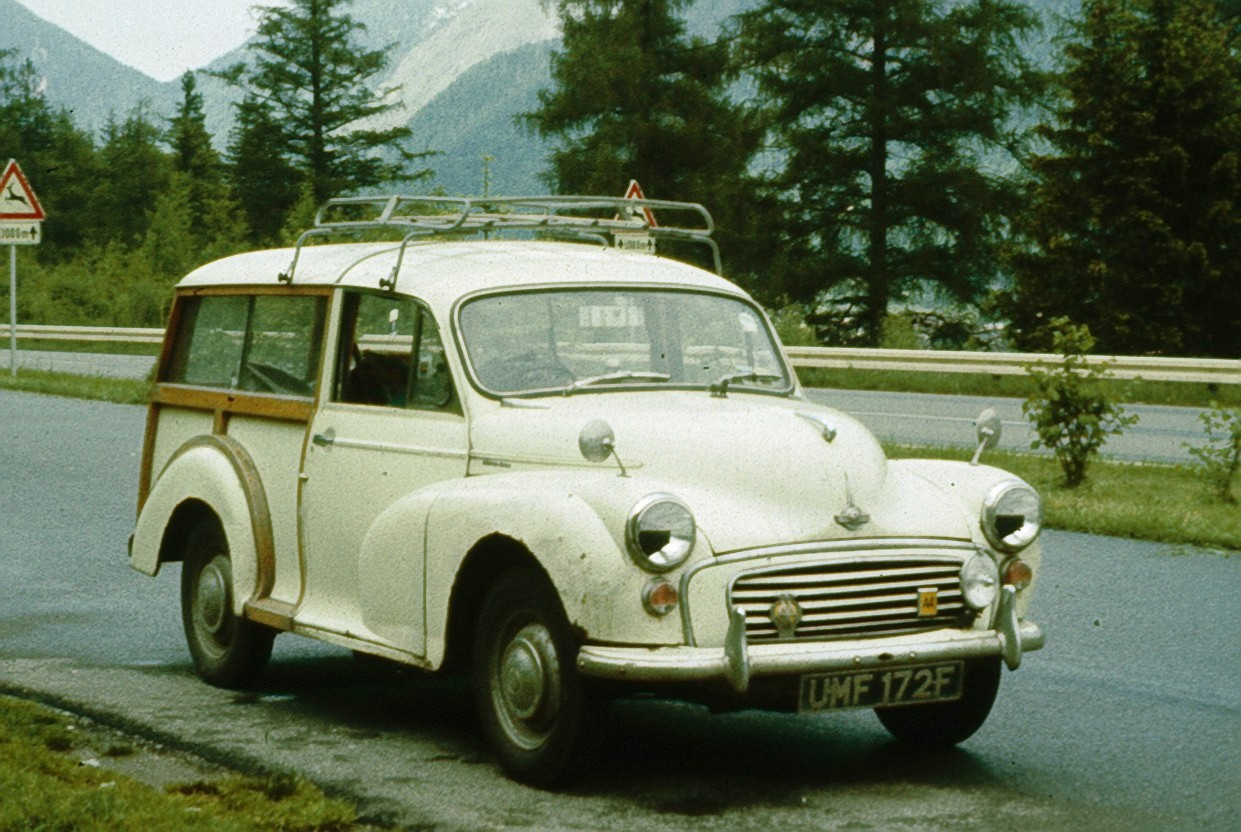
It is believed Mayo was last seen getting into a white Morris Traveller, similar to this vehicle

A massive police hunt was launched by Cheshire Police after Ansell-Lamb's murder, involving 120 officers. Investigators soon determined that neither the man Ansell-Lamb had met in Earl's Court nor any of her other male associates could have been responsible for the murder. As many fans of Manchester City were known to have travelled along the M6 from London to Manchester on the weekend of Ansell-Lamb's murder, investigators theorized her killer could have been one of these individuals. (Note: On the day before Ansell-Lamb's last sighting, Manchester City FC had faced West Bromwich Albion in the League Cup Final at Wembley Stadium in London. An estimated 40,000 fans of Manchester City had travelled to London to watch this fixture.)

The brutal killing of Mayo led to what was described as Britain's "biggest ever motorway hunt". The investigation into her murder was led by Detective Chief Superintendent Chris Pollard from Scotland Yard, as Derbyshire and Nottinghamshire police had limited resources. 1,500 police officers quizzed more than 125,000 people on motorways and took nearly 50,000 statements. In an unprecedented move, police set up checkpoints across 150 miles of the M1 between London and Leeds to ask drivers if they had any information, although this was not done until two weeks after the murder. For a whole day every vehicle at every junction along the 150-mile length of the motorway was stopped and checked. Officers then launched a publicity campaign with posters pasted all over Britain. It was believed that some men who might have given lifts to female hitch-hikers at the time had not come forward because they did not want their wives to know, and police appealed to them by saying that their wives would not be told if they came forward with information.

A reconstruction was broadcast on television a week after the motorway checkpoints were set up, covering Mayo's last known movements from her home in Hammersmith to the M1 motorway. The reconstruction led to 700 members of the public coming forward to say they had sighted Mayo. A significant sighting came from a man who said he was certain he had seen Mayo or a girl fitting her description at 4:00 p.m. on 12 October, thumbing for a lift and then getting into a white Morris Traveller at Kimberley, Nottinghamshire. This was less than twenty miles from where she was found dead and was located just off Junction 26 of the M1 motorway. The witness said he had driven past her thumbing for a lift, not being able to pick her up as he had others in the car, and said that he saw in his rear-view mirror her being picked up by a Morris Traveller which he had seen parked nearby moments earlier. The driver was described as being between 30 and 35 years old, of medium build with mousy hair brushed forward. The witness said the vehicle followed behind him heading towards the M1, and after both cars joined the motorway he soon lost sight of the vehicle. Police believed the driver was her killer. At that time 100,000 Morris Travellers were on the road in Britain, and each owner had to be traced and eliminated. Each driver of Morris Travellers in the country was spoken to. Despite this, the driver of the Morris Traveller never came forward. Another notable witness who came forward after the reconstruction was a butcher from Kimberley who said that he thought she had come into his shop and then walked down the hill towards the main road. No one came forward to say they had given a lift to Mayo that day, which was unusual as someone had to have driven her out of London to Kimberley. Several 'courting couples' were known to have been in the area where Mayo was found at the time she was dumped there, but none of them came forward either. The records of 28,000 criminals were checked and 76,000 leads were looked into.

Mayo was known to have caught the Tube from Hammersmith to Hendon and then had thumbed for a lift on the M1. It is believed 250,000 motorists were using the northbound carriageway on the M1 between the time Mayo left London and 14 October. At that time Mayo's murder inquiry was the largest investigation ever mounted by one police force in Britain.

Media reports soon suggested a link between the murders of Ansell-Lamb and Mayo, noting their clear similarities. Investigators confirmed they were looking into the links. During the investigations a man claiming to be the killer sent a note to detectives saying that the Mayo murder would not be the last.

=== "Yorkshire Ripper" theory investigated ===
When "Yorkshire Ripper" Peter Sutcliffe began his murder spree in the 1970s, Derbyshire Constabulary investigated whether the killings could be linked to Mayo's murder. Upon being convicted of the Ripper murders in 1981 he was formally questioned in connection with her death. It was known he had owned a Morris Traveller and had travelled to and from London around October 1970. Sutcliffe was finally eliminated from the investigation in December 1997.

=== Murder investigations linked ===
By 1990, Cheshire Police and Derbyshire Police increasingly suspected that the murders of Ansell-Lamb and Mayo could be linked. In January 1991 the lead investigators on each murder case from the two forces appeared on a joint appeal on Crimewatch, saying that although they were by no means certain they were looking for one man, there were "striking similarities" between the cases. It was announced that Cheshire and Derbyshire Police had decided to combine forces in an attempt to solve the two cases. A number of women came forward after the appeals to say they had been sexually assaulted in the same area where Mayo was last seen shortly before or after her murder.

The lead investigator on the Ansell-Lamb murder case revealed on Crimewatch that forensic scientists had recovered several pieces of carpet fibre from Ansell-Lamb's body, believed to have come from a carpet roll or a carpet sample. On the weekend she was murdered there had been a carpet exhibition at Earl's Court in London. It was also noted that the man she was last seen with was described as a rep or a salesman, and that it was the investigator's belief that the murderer had some connections to the carpet industry.

=== DNA profile isolated from Mayo's clothing ===
In 1997, Derbyshire Police obtained a DNA profile of the killer of Mayo from her clothing. Police attempted to trace all of the 250 original suspects for DNA testing, in order to see if their profiles matched. By 2009 all but a 'handful' had been located and eliminated. It was this DNA testing that also allowed detectives to eliminate Peter Sutcliffe from the investigation. 200,000 DNA profiles then on the national DNA database were quickly eliminated from the inquiry, and 9,000 samples taken from serving prisoners were also examined, but none matched the killer's profile. Police were hopeful that the recent DNA developments would soon help them solve Mayo's murder.

Detectives were also hopeful of DNA advances assisting the Ansell-Lamb inquiry and in determining whether the two women had been killed by the same man. A Derbyshire Police spokesperson stated: "Should a test be successful and find matching DNA, we would have a serial killer investigation that would get huge". However, in 1997 Cheshire Police revealed they had not at that point been able to isolate a DNA profile from Ansell-Lamb's garments.

In August 2001 detectives from Derbyshire Police made a televised appeal for information on a 90-minute programme titled Britain's Ten Most Wanted Murderers.

Multiple sources state that Ansell-Lamb's and Mayo's murders were conclusively linked through DNA in 1990. However, this is inaccurate, as although detectives concluded in 1990 that the two murders were likely (although not certainly) linked, no DNA profiles were isolated in the murder investigations until 1997, when the DNA profile was isolated from Mayo's clothing. Cheshire Police revealed at that time that they had not at that point managed to discover any DNA on Ansell-Lamb's clothing. In 2020, the former boyfriend of Mayo revealed that, despite the reports, investigators never extracted a DNA profile in the Ansell-Lamb case. He said that the claims that one had been originally came from a Reuters report that erroneously assumed that a DNA match had been made when police announced in 1990 that they believed the murders were likely linked. However, he added that while the 1990 reinvestigation did not prove a DNA link between the two women's murders, it did establish that other forensic evidence linked the murders.

== Subsequent developments and theories ==
In the late 2000s, police investigated whether serial killer Peter Tobin could have committed the murders, as he had just been convicted of the murders of three young women, including that of a hitch-hiking girl he had picked up and killed in 1991. However, police eliminated him from their enquiries. Criminologist David Wilson stated in a book on Tobin in 2010 that he was unlikely to be responsible and could be ruled out as a suspect by DNA, and that the DNA samples from the two murders had already been cross-referenced to Tobin's profile.

In 2008, Harvey Richardson, a 77-year-old man who had just died, was found to have newspaper clippings regarding Ansell-Lamb's murder hidden in his house alongside a confession to the murder of another woman, 19-year-old Lorraine Jacob, who had been killed in Liverpool in September 1970. He had previously lived in London, Manchester, Bolton and Wigan before he had died of cancer. Investigators said there was no evidence linking him to Ansell-Lamb or Mayo's murder. They pointed out that the man had no access to a car and never had a driving licence.

In 2009, crime writer Scott Lomax revealed in a book he published about unsolved murders that Manchester City were playing in London at the time of Mayo's murder, just as in Ansell-Lamb's case, and that police had never investigated whether the killer could again have been returning from the football match in London when he came across Mayo on the M1.

In 2015, crime writers Chris Clark and Tim Tate published a book in which they claimed that Ansell-Lamb and Mayo's murders could be linked to Yorkshire Ripper Peter Sutcliffe. However, he had previously been ruled out by investigators in 1997 through DNA. Clark and Tate also claimed in the book that Sutcliffe could also be responsible for the murders of Eve Stratford and Lynne Weedon, but the DNA sample in Mayo's murder case has not been linked by police to the cases of Weedon or Stratford, showing the murders were committed by different people. Upon Sutcliffe's death in 2020, Clark submitted a Freedom of Information request to the Home Office, asking if Sutcliffe's DNA was on the national DNA database. The Home Office confirmed that it was, indicating that Sutcliffe can be ruled out of unsolved murder cases in which there is existing DNA evidence such as in the Mayo case. Notably, neither the Mayo or Ansell-Lamb case featured in the subsequent 2022 ITV documentary version of Clark's book.

In 2019, Don Hale, the journalist behind a campaign to free a man he believed to be wrongly imprisoned for the 1973 murder of Wendy Sewell, claimed in a book that Sewell's murder could be linked to Mayo's. He claimed that Mayo and Sewell looked similar and said their murders had been committed nearby. However, other writers have said there is very little evidence to suggest the murders are linked. The man whose release Hale successfully campaigned for in the Sewell case, Stephen Downing, remains the police's only suspect in the murder of Wendy Sewell. In 2003 Derbyshire Police stated after a reinvestigation of the murder that had the rules on double jeopardy been different, they would have re-charged Downing.

Both Hale and Clark continue to regularly make claims in the media that either Sutcliffe or the killer of Wendy Sewell was responsible for Ansell-Lamb and Mayo's deaths, or that they are the same.

Investigators continue to regularly appeal for information on the murders of Ansell-Lamb and Mayo. The building where Ansell-Lamb was last seen is now Lymm Truckstop.

== See also ==
- Murder of Marie Wilks – high-profile unsolved UK motorway murder in 1988
- Cold case
- List of kidnappings
- Lists of solved missing person cases
- List of unsolved murders in the United Kingdom (1970s)
- Murders of Eve Stratford and Lynne Weedon
- Murders of Kate Bushell and Lyn Bryant – two other UK unsolved murders police believe may be linked
- Murder of Carol Wilkinson – another case that has been linked to "Yorkshire Ripper" Peter Sutcliffe
- Murder of Patsy Morris – another case that has been linked to "Yorkshire Ripper" Peter Sutcliffe

Other UK cold cases where the offender's DNA is known:

- Murder of Deborah Linsley
- Murder of Lindsay Rimer
- Murder of Janet Brown
- Murder of Linda Cook
- Murder of Melanie Hall
- Batman rapist, subject to Britain's longest-running serial rape investigation

== Cited works and further reading ==
- Boar, Roger; Blundell, Nigel (1991). "The Motorway Monster". The World's Greatest Unsolved Crimes. London: Hamlyn. pp. 185–186. ISBN 9780600572312.
- Canning, John (1992). Unsolved Murders and Mysteries. London: Little, Brown Book Group Limited. ISBN 978-0-751-50896-3.
- Clark, Chris; Tate, Tim (2015). Yorkshire Ripper: The Secret Murders. London: John Blake. ISBN 978-1-78418-418-6.
- Cawthorne, Nigel (2007). The Mammoth Book of Killers at Large. London: Robinson Publishing. ISBN 978-1-845-29631-5.
- Lomax, Scott (2009). "Barbara Mayo: Ault Hucknall 1970". Unsolved Murders in and Around Derbyshire. Barnsley: Pen & Sword. ISBN 9781783408870.
- Nash, Jay Robert (1983). Open Files: A Narrative Encyclopedia of the World's Greatest Unsolved Crimes. London: The Rowman & Littlefield Publishing Group, Inc. ISBN 978-0-070-45907-6.
- Wilson, David; Harrison, Paul (2010). "Cold cases". The Lost British Serial Killer: Closing the Case on Peter Tobin and Bible John. London: Sphere. pp. 202–234. ISBN 978-0-7515-4232-5.
