= Murder of Janet Brown =

1995 murder in Buckinghamshire, England

Janet Brown
- Brown, c. January – April 1995
- Born: 27 January 1944; Southampton, Hampshire, England
- Died: 10 April 1995 (aged 51); Hall Farm, Spriggs Holly Lane, Radnage, High Wycombe, Buckinghamshire
- Cause of death: Beating with a blunt instrument, possibly a crowbar
- Occupation: Nurse
- Known for: Victim of unsolved murder
- Spouse: Grahaem Brown
- Children: 3

Janet Brown (27 January 1944 – 10 April 1995) was an English nurse who was murdered by an intruder in her house in Radnage, Buckinghamshire in 1995. The case remains unsolved, and the investigation remains open. A link has been suggested between her murder and that of 50-year-old Carolanne Jackson 10 miles away in Wooburn Green, which occurred in similar circumstances and on almost the exact same day two years later. In 2015 it was announced by police that a DNA profile of Brown's killer had been extracted.

== Biography ==
Janet Brown was born in Southampton, an only child. She worked as a research nurse at the Public Health and Primary Care department of Oxford University. Her husband Grahaem Brown worked in Switzerland as a senior executive at Ciba-Geigy, a pharmaceuticals company. The couple had three children and the family lived in a remote farmhouse situated on an 11-acre (4.5 ha) estate in Radnage, Buckinghamshire, valued at £345,000 (1995 prices).

Following a spate of local burglaries, Janet Brown had formed the local Neighbourhood Watch scheme. She was known to be security-conscious and had installed a panic alarm in the house.

== Murder ==
Brown was at home alone on the evening of 10 April 1995. Her husband was working in Switzerland, her eldest daughter and son were at university and her youngest daughter was staying at the home of a friend. At some point after 20:20 GMT, one or more intruders entered the house and handcuffed and gagged Brown, and then beat her across the head with a blunt instrument, possibly a crowbar, until dead. Police described the attack as "extremely brutal."

Brown is believed to have triggered a panic button in her bedroom at one point during the attack. Despite the ringing alarm, the killer seemed to have taken his time at the scene, washing his hands of blood and moving around the house.

Brown's body was discovered by builder Nick Marshall and his teenage son, who were performing renovation work on the garage, at the bottom of her stairs at 8:11 GMT on 11 April.

Brown's funeral and burial took place at St Mary the Virgin church in Radnage, on 13 June.

== Initial investigation ==
There was no evidence of sexual assault, and police stated that they remain open-minded regarding the motive.

A prominent theory was that the murder was a result of a bungled burglary. The intruder had used glass-cutting equipment on the first panel of the doubled-glazed patio door and then smashed the second panel. However, although a television and video recorder were unplugged, nothing had been stolen from the house. Most burglaries take place during the day, when it is less likely that anyone is home. It is unusual for burglars to target properties in which someone is obviously inside, and there were two cars parked outside the house. Detective superintendent Martin Short, who led the investigation, said, "on balance, I don't think the motive was burglary. If a burglar did it, it wasn't a half-decent one."

Police were unable to discover any evidence of an extramarital affair, and considered the scenario unlikely. Other theories, such as industrial espionage, a failed kidnapping or a contract killing, were examined and dismissed.

Police stated their belief that, given the isolated location of the murder, the perpetrator was most likely a local man who was familiar with the area.

Forensic psychologist Paul Britton assisted police with the investigation. Britton posited that although Brown had not been sexually assaulted, the perpetrator may have become aroused by inflicting fear and dominating his victim, and that this may have been his primary motive rather than burglary.

Author Vanessa Brown wrote, "thieves don't take handcuffs to a robbery and strip their victims ... The one focus had been Janet, a desire to humiliate and control her. It had to be personal."

Detective superintendent Martin Short commented:

There is no theory to explain what happened that night which makes perfect sense. There are aspects of every theory which are contradicted by the facts. And policemen deal in facts. The intruder showed a fair amount of planning. He had an iron bar or truncheon, two types of tape, handcuffs, a glass cutter and probably a torch. I have the gut feeling that it wasn't burglary. He didn't react like a normal burglar. More than 99 percent of burglars would run on hearing an alarm go off. This one not only continued his murderous attack but coolly washed his hands and went upstairs again. We don't know the motive. In most murders, once you've got the motive, then you're a long way to cracking it. There are no indications that Mrs Brown had a boyfriend. Everything points to the fact that she was a respectable woman who doted on her family. Her husband was definitely in Switzerland when she was killed and he had nothing to gain by her death.

By the second anniversary of the murder, 2,700 people had been interviewed by the police.

== Possible links to Carolanne Jackson murder ==
Carolanne Jackson
- Jackson, c. January – April 1997
- Born: Carolyne Jackson; 23 May 1946
- Died: 11 April 1997 (age 50); Apple Tree Cottage, Berghers Hill, Wooburn Green, Buckinghamshire
- Cause of death: Asphyxiation, beating
- Other name: Carol Anne Jackson
- Occupations: Jewellery and antiques dealer
- Known for: Victim of unsolved murder
- Spouse(s): None (single, lived alone)

The distance between Brown's 1995 murder and Jackson's 1997 murder, both within Buckinghamshire.

On 11 April 1997, there was a similar murder of a 50-year-old woman 10 miles away in Wooburn Green, and police announced that they were investigating possible links between the cases. The victim was a jewellery dealer named Carolanne Jackson (also known as Carolyne Ann Jackson or Carol Anne Jackson), who ran an antiques business from her home. She had complained at least twice to police about a stalker before she was found bound and dead in the kitchen of her cottage. She died from asphyxiation and from head injuries, and police believed that she had been beaten to death by a burglar who had tried to force her to instruct him how to open her safe, where a large amount of jewels were stored. They also revealed that the killer may have waited for Jackson to return from a trip abroad, and followed her into her home as she was unloading her car. Jackson had lived alone, and she was also known to be very security-conscious and her home was protected by an alarm system. A few months before her death, she had contacted police complaining of a man following her as she drove, and had also reported a man standing outside her house who also banged on the door. She had also registered other complaints about being followed, and had been burgled the previous year. The lead detective on the case stated: "It is my firm suspicion that regrettably Ms Jackson had been targeted by someone who knew what sort of trade she was in. Someone suspected she might have items at her home which would be of value. It is likely they had been hanging around the area waiting for her and, indeed, may have been in the area in earlier days or weeks." Some suggested that, had Jackson been stalked, her murder could have been sexually motivated.

The murders of Brown and Jackson, who were almost the same age, occurred on almost the same day two years apart; in Brown's case 10 April, in Jackson's 11 April.

The murderer had tied Jackson's hands and feet and took a £2,000 Rolex watch, which she had worn every day for 20 years, from her body, as well as other jewellery. A gold 1930s Cartier bracelet snatched from her wrist has never been recovered. The police were unable to open the house safe to discover whether the attacker had taken anything from it. The cottage had been ransacked and the contents of the cupboards and drawers were strewn across the floor. The severe wounds on Jackson's head were caused by strikes using fists and a blunt instrument. The items by which her hands and feet were bound had originated within the home.

A witness claimed to have seen a man acting suspiciously in the woods near Jackson's home on the night of the murder. The day after this sighting was reported in the press, police found a bag of clothes in the woods containing some light casual clothes, towels and a "sports gear" torch inside a green bag. Detectives did not know whether the items were connected to the murder.

Police also examined a possible link between Jackson's murder and a February robbery at a Wargrave antiques store at which an elderly couple were bound by thieves. There had been other incidents in the Buckinghamshire region in recent weeks involving wealthy victims who had been attacked and robbed in their homes by gangs. Detectives also examined possible links to a string of about 100 violent robberies nationwide, some of which were attributed to the work of a gang of robbers known as the Quality Street Gang.

In 1998, Jackson's and Brown's murders were suggested to be linked by Operation Enigma, a nationwide investigation into the unsolved murders of 207 women.

An inquest into Jackson's death in 1999 concluded that she was almost certainly killed by an opportunistic thief who followed her to her house after she had withdrawn £500 from a cashpoint at 9:30 p.m. She was likely attacked as she unloaded items from her car. Detectives also revealed that they wanted to trace two men who had been seen leaving the area in a dark car that evening.

== Developments since 2015 ==
In 2015, police announced that they had isolated a DNA sample from the scene of the Brown murder. Almost every male from the surrounding area, a total of more than 700 people, was tested, but no match was found.

Police later said that they were concentrating on the bungled-burglary theory. The chief investigating officer in 2015, Peter Beirne, stated, "[M]y working hypothesis at the moment is that it was a burglar, or burglars, who weren't particularly proficient. They came across Janet, they had control of her because they handcuffed her, and I think she was bludgeoned to death when she pressed the panic alarm."

In 2020, a £20,000 reward was offered to anyone who could provide tips that will lead to an arrest, a joint effort by Crimestoppers and Thames Valley Police.

== See also ==
- List of unsolved murders in the United Kingdom
- Murders of Kate Bushell and Lyn Bryant – Two other UK unsolved murders that police believe may be linked

Other UK cold cases for which the offender's DNA is known:

- Murder of Deborah Linsley
- Murders of Eve Stratford and Lynne Weedon
- Murders of Jacqueline Ansell-Lamb and Barbara Mayo
- Murder of Lindsay Rimer
- Murder of Linda Cook
- Murder of Melanie Hall
- Batman rapist, subject to Britain's longest-running serial-rape investigation
