= Murder of Melanie Hall =

British hospital clerk who disappeared in 1996 at Bath, Somerset, later found murdered

Melanie Hall
- Melanie Hall
- Born: 20 August 1970; England
- Disappeared: 9 June 1996 (aged 25); Bath, Somerset, UK
- Status: Declared dead in absentia on 17 November 2004 (aged 34)
- Body discovered: 5 October 2009; Thornbury, Gloucestershire, UK
- Education: University of Bath
- Occupation: Clerical officer
- Employer: Royal United Hospital
- Known for: Murder victim
- Parents: Steve Hall (father); Patricia Hall (mother)

Melanie Hall (20 August 1970 – disappeared 9 June 1996; declared legally dead 17 November 2004) was a British hospital clerical officer from Bradford-on-Avon, Wiltshire, who disappeared following a night out in Bath. She was declared dead in absentia in 2004.

On 5 October 2009, her partial remains were discovered, after a rubbish bag containing human bones was found by a workman on the M5 motorway near Thornbury, South Gloucestershire. On 7 October 2009, the bones, which included a pelvis, thigh bone and a skull, were analysed and identified as belonging to Melanie Hall. It was determined that she had suffered severe fractures to her skull and face, and had been tied up with rope, although a definitive cause of death could not be established. Over the years, various people have been arrested in connection with the murder, but subsequently released.

== Background ==
Hall was described by her parents as a "young, vibrant daughter". She had graduated from the University of Bath in 1995 with a degree in sociology and psychology; Hall's mother, Pat Hall, said graduation had been a "cherished" dream of Melanie for four years. Melanie Hall worked as a clerical officer at Bath's Royal United Hospital. Her father, Stephen Hall, had been chairman of Bath City Football Club.

== Disappearance ==
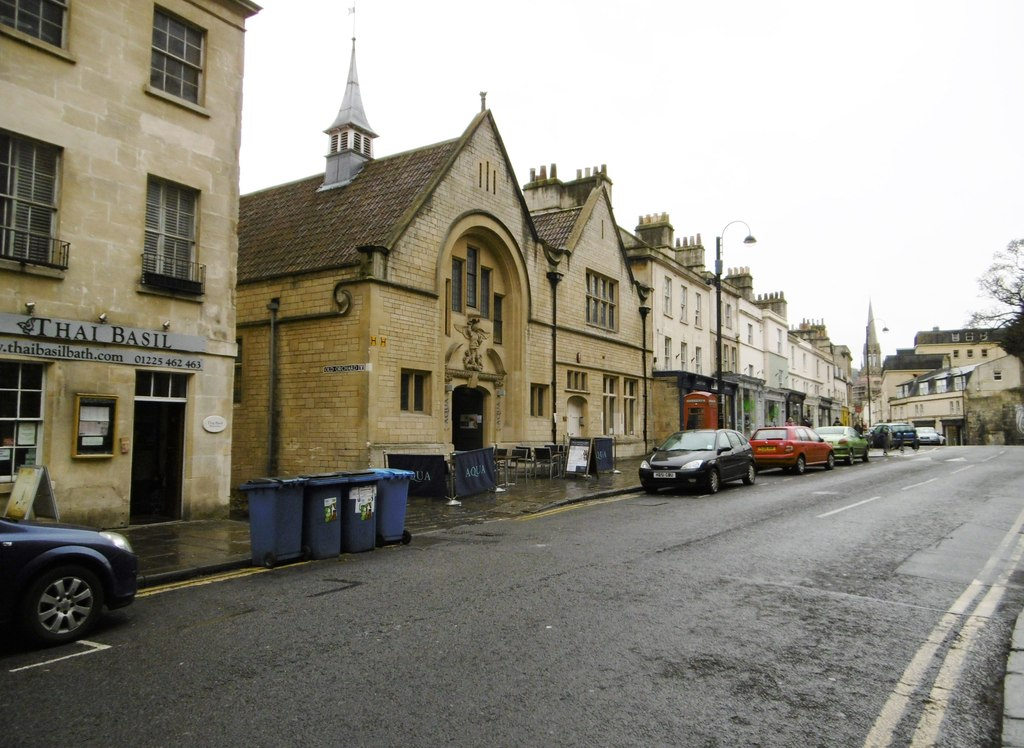
The old St Michael's Church Hall. On the night Melanie Hall went missing, she was seen by witnesses arguing with an unidentified man in the doorway of this building, who is believed to have been her abductor.

Hall had arranged to stay with her boyfriend Philip Karlbaum on 8 June, and her mother dropped her off at his home. On the night of 8 June 1996, Hall went to Cadillacs nightclub in Walcot Street, Bath with Karlbaum and another couple. Hall was reported as having had an argument with Karlbaum, and he left the club "upset" after he allegedly saw her dancing with another man. Hall was last seen sitting on a stool in the club at around 1:10 am on 9 June 1996. She was reported missing on 11 June 1996 by her parents after she failed to turn up for work.

Locations
1 01:15 Sighting, Cadillacs nightclub, 90 Walcot Street.
2 02:00 Woman arguing with man, old St Michaels Church Hall building, 88 Walcot Street.
3 Podium car park, 9a Walcot Street - man coaxing woman.
4 Dominos, 66 Walcot Street - Prior location of eyewitnesses to argument by church hall.
5 1984 Murder of Melanie Road, St Stephens Court/Broad Street after a night out.

Karlbaum described his devastation at her disappearance on 17 June 1996. Avon and Somerset police launched several searches of the River Avon after her disappearance and interviewed thousands of clubbers and taxi drivers. A £10,000 reward was offered for information, and the BBC programmes Crimewatch and Crimestoppers made appeals to the public for information, as did Hall's sister Dominique, but no trace of Hall was found. The Crimewatch appeal broadcast on 5 November 1996 included details of unconfirmed sightings of Hall around the time she disappeared: one witness saw a woman who resembled Hall in Cadillacs nightclub, talking to a man, and saw them leave together; at approximately 2 am on 9 June, two women had left Domino's Pizza on Walcot Street and were heading towards the nightclub, when they witnessed a woman who looked like Hall arguing with a man outside the church hall; around the same time, further along Walcot Street, another witness saw a man coaxing a woman, who may have been Hall, into the Podium car park.

Hall was declared legally dead on 17 November 2004.

=== Discovery of remains ===
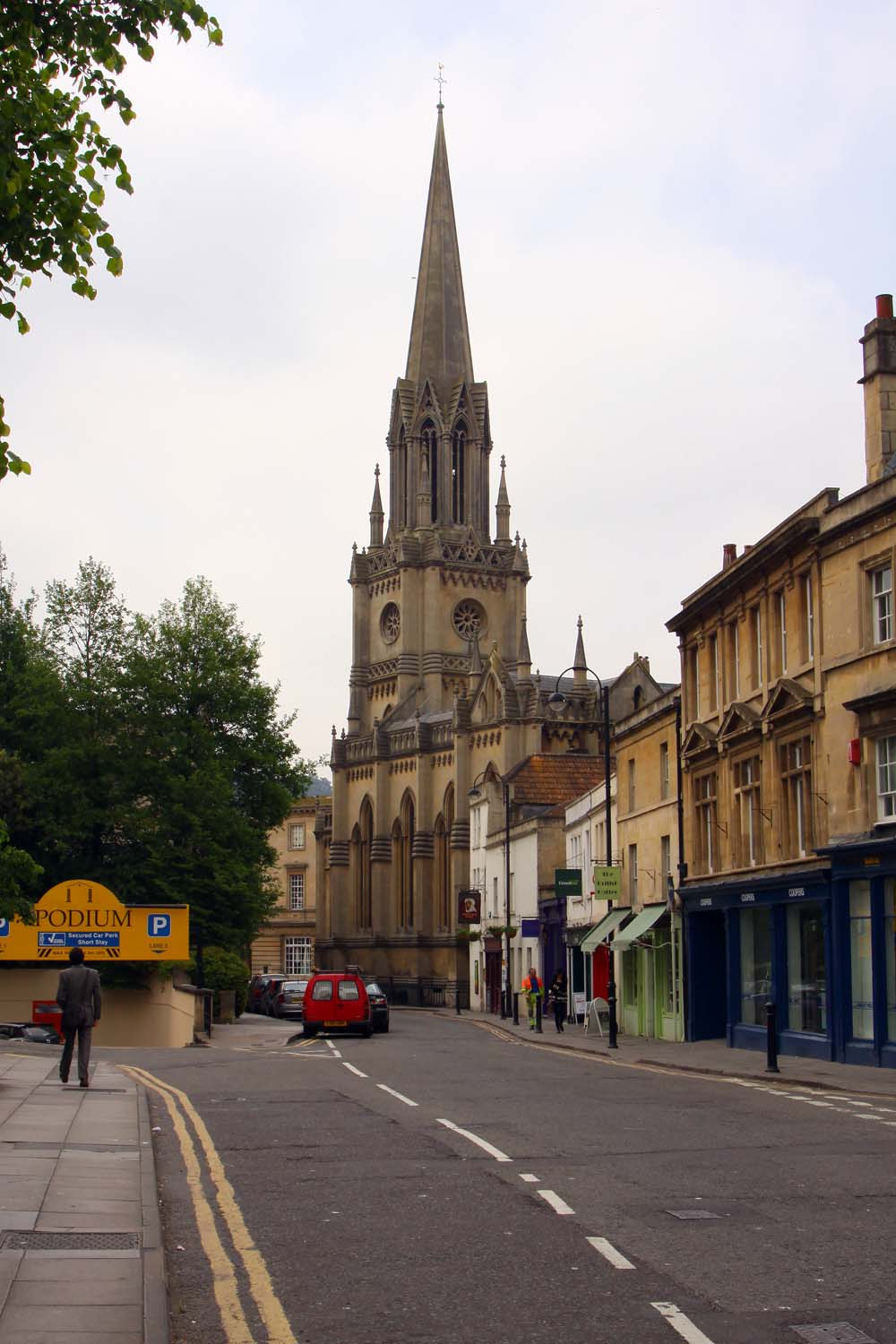
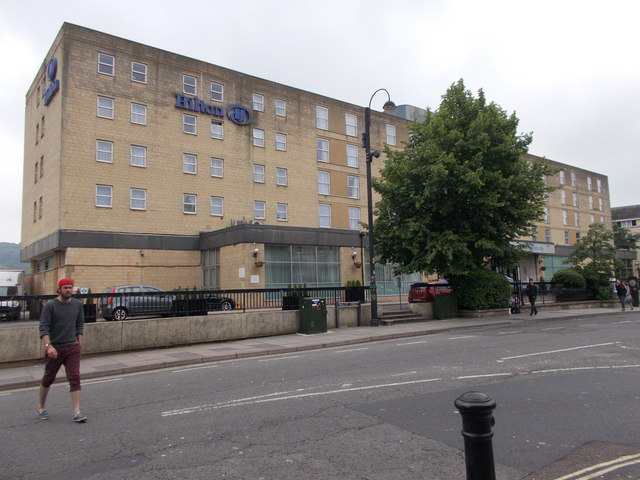
The final unconfirmed sighting of Hall was of her being coaxed reluctantly by a male into the Podium car park further down Walcot Street. This was about 100 metres (110 yards) away from Cadillacs club and the church building, where there was an unconfirmed sighting of her arguing with a man.

On 5 October 2009, a motorway worker found a plastic bin bag containing bones while he was clearing a vegetation patch on a slip road at Junction 14 of the M5 motorway. The bones in the bag included a skull, pelvis and thigh bone, and further remains were found buried and spread around the field by the side of the motorway. Police confirmed that the remains were human, and they showed a piece of jewellery found at the site to Hall's parents, who confirmed that it had belonged to their daughter. Despite this, police refused to confirm that the body was that of Hall until a post-mortem had been carried out. The remains were formally identified as being Hall's through dental records on 7 October. She had incurred severe blunt trauma to her head resulting in a fractured skull, cheekbone and jaw. Blue rope had been used to tie the bin bags around Hall's body.

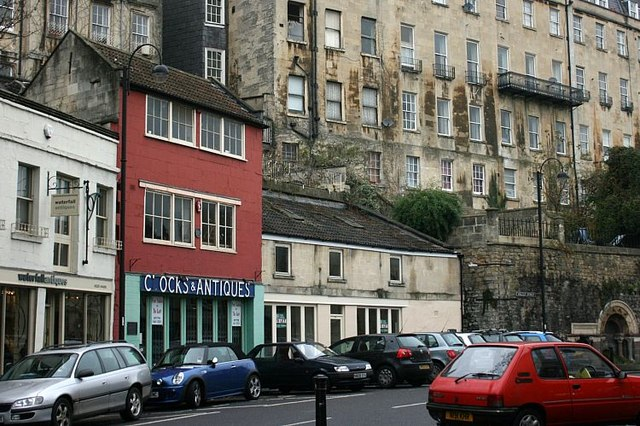
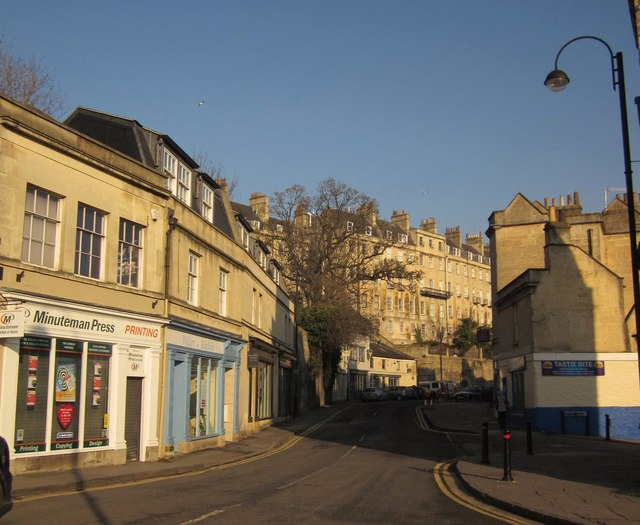
Walcot Street in Bath, looking north, shown in 2007 and 2012. Cadillacs Nightclub, where Hall disappeared from, was only about 40-80 metres (44-87 yards) further up this road (in the direction the cameras are facing). Two of the witness sightings came from women emerging from what was then Domino's Pizza.

Hall's parents launched a fresh appeal on 8 October for anyone with information to come forward, while Avon and Somerset CID DS Mike Britton stated that he was staying on after his retirement to continue working on the Hall disappearance, codenamed Operation Denmark, having spent 13 years on the case. On 29 October 2009, police announced that three keys to a Ford vehicle, possibly a Transit, Fiesta or Escort, had been found near the body, and that they were working with Ford to try to identify the vehicle. Crimewatch also launched a fresh appeal for information, which resulted in more than 200 phone calls from the public. The reward for information leading to arrest was also increased to £20,000.

In October 2019, police revealed they had obtained a partial DNA profile from the rope wrapped around the bag containing Hall's remains and stated that they remained confident that Hall's killer would be caught. Her parents reinstated a £50,000 reward for information leading to an arrest and conviction.

=== Arrests ===
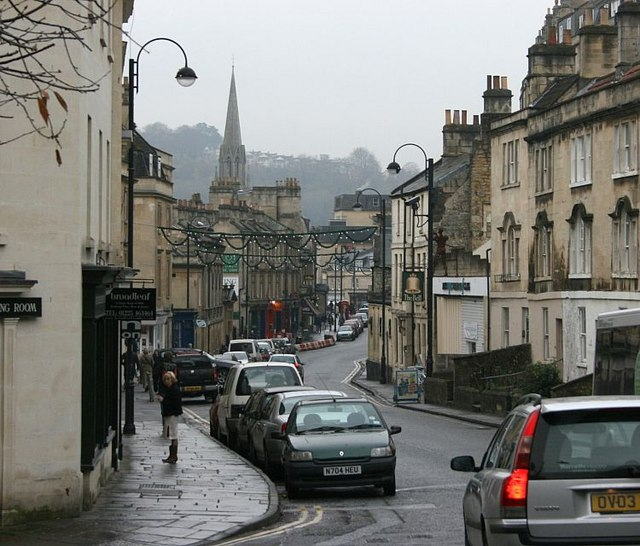
Walcot Street in Bath, looking south towards the site of Cadillacs Nightclub where Hall disappeared from, 2007.

In 1998, the suspected killer of Suzy Lamplugh, John Cannan, was questioned over the disappearance of Melanie Hall. Known for his Bristol connections, Cannan was spoken to by police after allegations came to light that he had plotted the murder of Hall from his prison cell at HM Prison Durham. Detectives investigated claims from sources who said that Cannan had spent many hours planning what he described as the "perfect" abduction with a fellow inmate. The other inmate was a convicted rapist who supposedly put the plan into action after being released from prison.

Inexplicably, although Cannan was in prison at the time Melanie Hall was last seen alive, some witnesses came forward to say they were certain that Cannan was the man they had seen abducting Hall that night. Hall's parents said that they feared if Cannan was responsible for their daughter's death they would never know the truth of what happened to her, as Cannan was infamous for tactically withholding information about victims in order to maintain a sense of control over investigators.

In 2003, police arrested two men in connection with Hall's disappearance but they were released without charge after police searched buildings and a field near Bath. In 2009, a 37-year-old man confessed his involvement in Hall's murder to police in Greater Manchester, but was eliminated from the inquiry after undergoing psychiatric tests. In July 2010, a 38-year-old man from Bath was arrested on suspicion of Hall's murder and subsequently released on bail. In August 2010, a 39-year-old man from Wiltshire was arrested by police on suspicion of murder after handing himself in at a police station in the Avon and Somerset area. The man was subsequently released on bail.

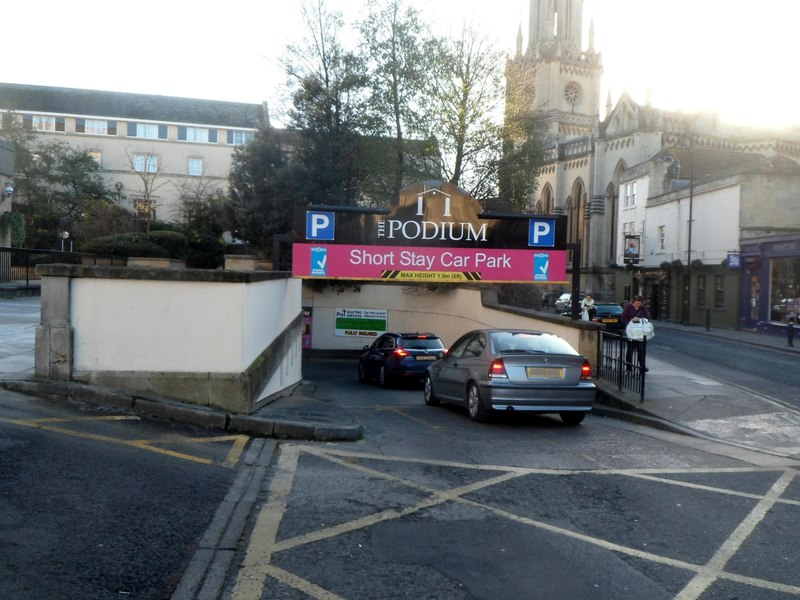
Hall's abductor may have parked his car in the Podium car park on Walcot Street that night, and taken Hall to it after she left the club at around 2:00 am.

In October 2013, police said that they had found a white Volkswagen Golf car connected to their inquiries, and had received relevant information about the rope used to tie up Hall's body. On 25 November 2013, it was reported that a 44-year-old man had been arrested at an address in Bath, on suspicion of murder. The man was released on bail until 19 December, and a property at Roundhill Park, Whiteway, was searched. On 28 November 2014 it was reported that there was insufficient evidence to charge the suspect. On 23 June 2016, a 45-year-old man was arrested following retrieval of DNA from where Hall's remains were discovered, and released on bail a few days later.

By October 2019, eleven arrests had been made during the police investigation but no one has ever been charged.

=== Links to other cases ===
Police have yet to rule out the suggested links to John Cannan and the murder of estate agent Suzy Lamplugh (who disappeared in July 1986 and whose body has never been found). They have also not ruled out links to the case of a serial sex attacker in Bath, nicknamed the "Batman rapist" after he left a baseball cap bearing a Batman logo at the scene of one attack. The unknown assailant is known to have attempted to carjack a woman at knifepoint, leaving her wounded when she fought back and managed to escape, in the same area of the city a few hours before Hall was abducted.

It has also been suggested that there may be a link between Hall's murder and Levi Bellfield, who is serving life imprisonment with a whole life order for the murders of Milly Dowler, Marsha McDonnell, and Amélie Delagrange committed between 2002 and 2004. A suggested link with convicted killer Christopher Halliwell, who is serving a life sentence with a whole life order for the murders of Sian O'Callaghan and Becky Godden-Edwards, has been ruled out by Avon and Somerset Police.

== Media ==
External videos
- The Body in the Bag: The Murder of Melanie Hall (Five)

In 2024, Channel 5 broadcast The Body in the Bag: The Murder of Melanie Hall.

== See also ==
- List of solved missing person cases (1990s)
- List of unsolved murders in the United Kingdom (1990s)
- Murder of Marie Wilks – case in which a woman was found dead by the nearby M50 motorway in 1988
- Disappearance of Suzy Lamplugh – woman believed to have been killed by John Cannan who has been linked to Hall's murder
- Murder of Lindsay Rimer – unsolved 1994 case of a British girl who disappeared and was found a year later in a nearby canal

Other UK unsolved murders where there is DNA evidence:

- Murder of Deborah Linsley
- Murders of Eve Stratford and Lynne Weedon
- Murders of Jacqueline Ansell-Lamb and Barbara Mayo
- Murder of Lyn Bryant
- Murder of Janet Brown
- Murder of Linda Cook

== Bibliography ==
- Welch, Claire (2012). "Melanie Hall". Unsolved Crimes: From the Case Files of The People and Daily Mirror. Yeovil: Haynes. pp. 134–138. ISBN 978-0-857331-75-5.
