= Exwick =

Area of Exeter, Devon, England

Coordinates: 50.73786°N 3.54732°W

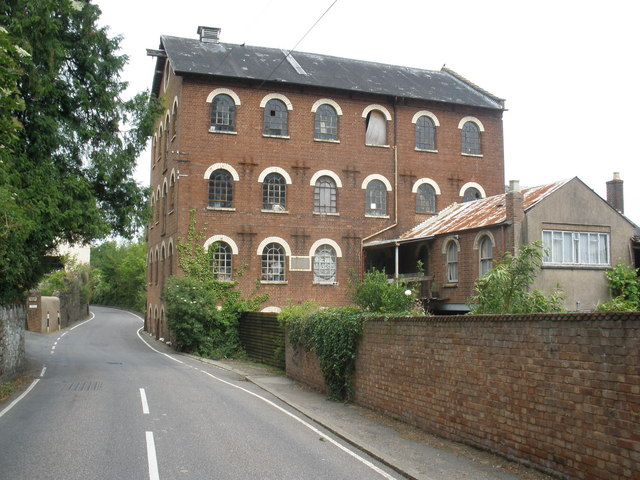
- Exwick Mills

- Exwick district ward in Exeter

- Location within Devon
- Shire county: Devon
- Region: South West
- Country: England
- Sovereign state: United Kingdom
- Post town: EXETER
- Postcode district: EX4
- Dialling code: 01392
- Police: Devon and Cornwall
- Fire: Devon and Somerset
- Ambulance: South Western
- UK Parliament: Exeter

Exwick is an historic parish and manor in Devon, England, which today is a north-western suburb of the City of Exeter. Its name is derived from the River Exe, which forms its eastern boundary. It is also an Ecclesiastical parish and an electoral ward. At the 2021 census, the ward had a population of 9,767.

Mentioned in Domesday Book, it was the site of farms, orchards and mills. Exwick meaning farm by the river Exe.

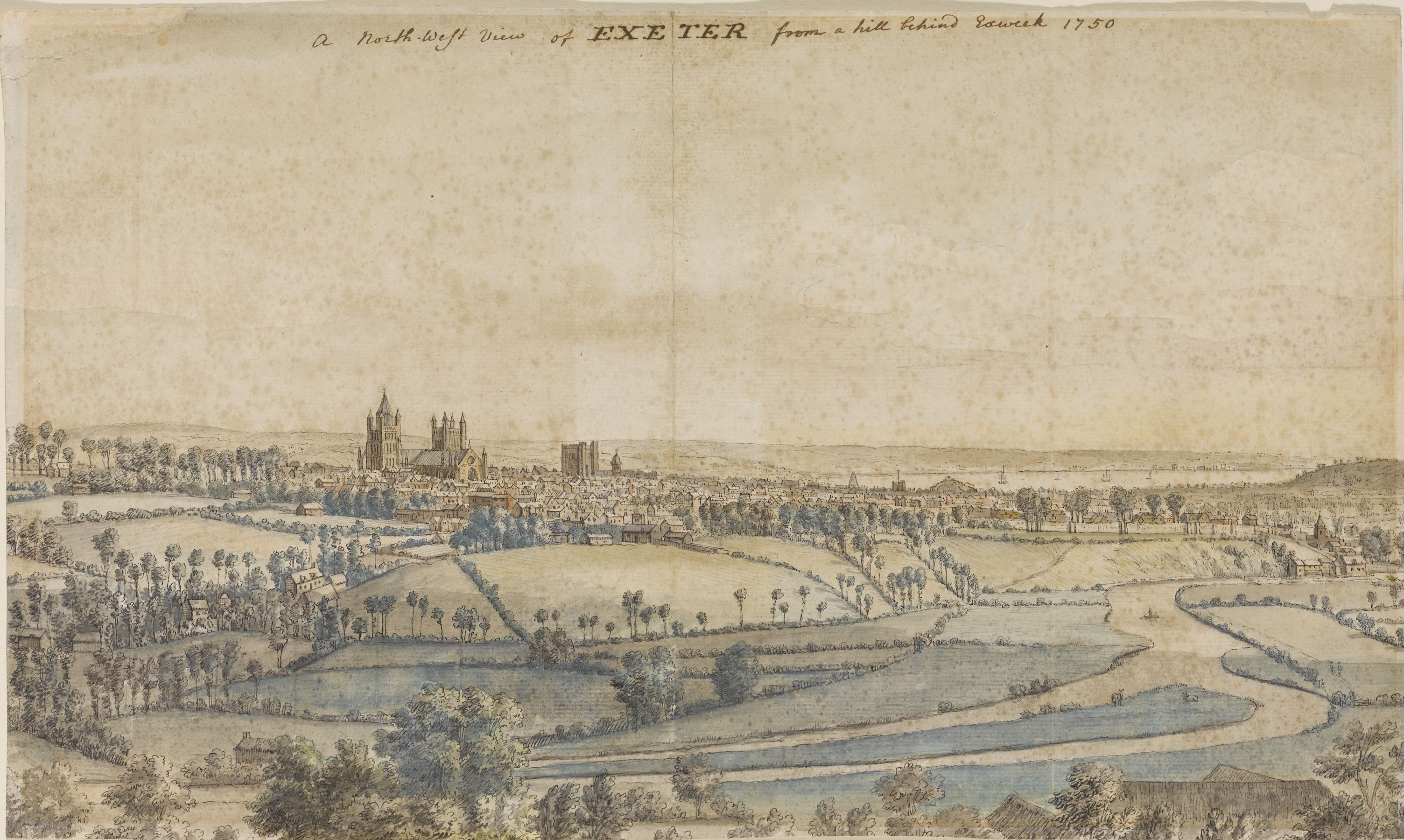
1750 watercolour by Coplestone Warre Bampfylde of Exeter from Exwick from the Royal Albert Memorial Museum's collection (3/1953/1)

Being on the edge of the Exe floodplain, mill industries were important in Exwick. A leat from the Exe was dug before Domesday Book was compiled. Other industries formerly in the area include clothmaking, aircraft parts and baking. Manufacture of wooden flooring continues to this day.

There were a number of large houses in the area including Cleve House which became a Guide Dogs for the Blind training centre in the 1950s. Later it became private houses and the site of a new primary school. The Mallet family bought Exwick Mill.

Another important family with an Exwick Connection were the Gibbs. Andrew Gibbs from Clyst St Mary in Exeter, following several adventures, was involved in setting up the Antony Gibbs & Sons cloth business in 1778. William Gibbs paid to make Exwick a separate parish from St Thomas and extend the Chapel of ease into the full church of St. Andrews.

The area is often used as a location for painters to look back at Exeter, including Francis Towne in 1773 and J. M. W. Turner in 1811.

The murder of Kate Bushell, one of Britain's most high-profile unsolved murders, occurred in Exwick in November 1997.

== Public transport ==
Public transport in Exwick is limited to buses, operated by Stagecoach Devon, and taxis. The bus services are known as the E. Bus to locals Railway services are provided at Exeter St Davids station.

== Kate Bushell murder ==
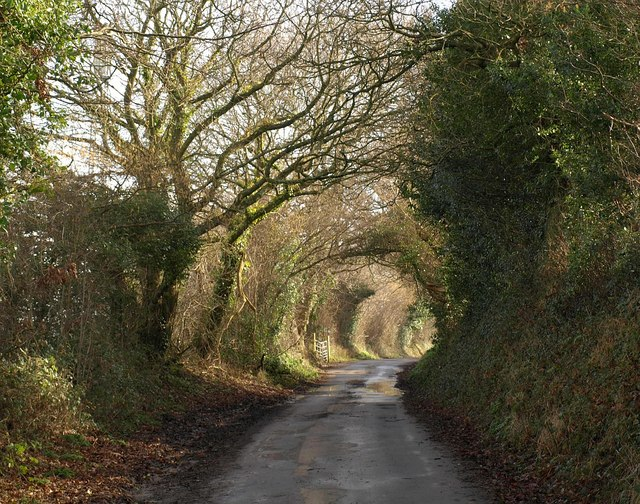
Exwick Lane, where Kate Bushell was last seen alive walking her dog on 15 November 1997. She was found murdered on the footpath to the left of the gate. Near to Bushell, on the right of this image, a man was seen standing next to a blue vehicle. This man has never come forward or been traced. This was only minutes before she was killed.

A high-profile, random murder of a child occurred in Exwick in 1997, which today remains one of the UK's highest-profile unsolved murders. 14-year-old Kate Bushell, a pupil at what is now West Exe School, had her throat cut by an unidentified attacker while walking her dog along Exwick Lane on 15 November 1997. Despite the police insisting the killer must be local and repeatedly appealing for locals to come forward with information on Crimewatch, the attacker has never been identified. There remains a £10,000 reward for information leading to the capture of the killer.

== Gallery ==
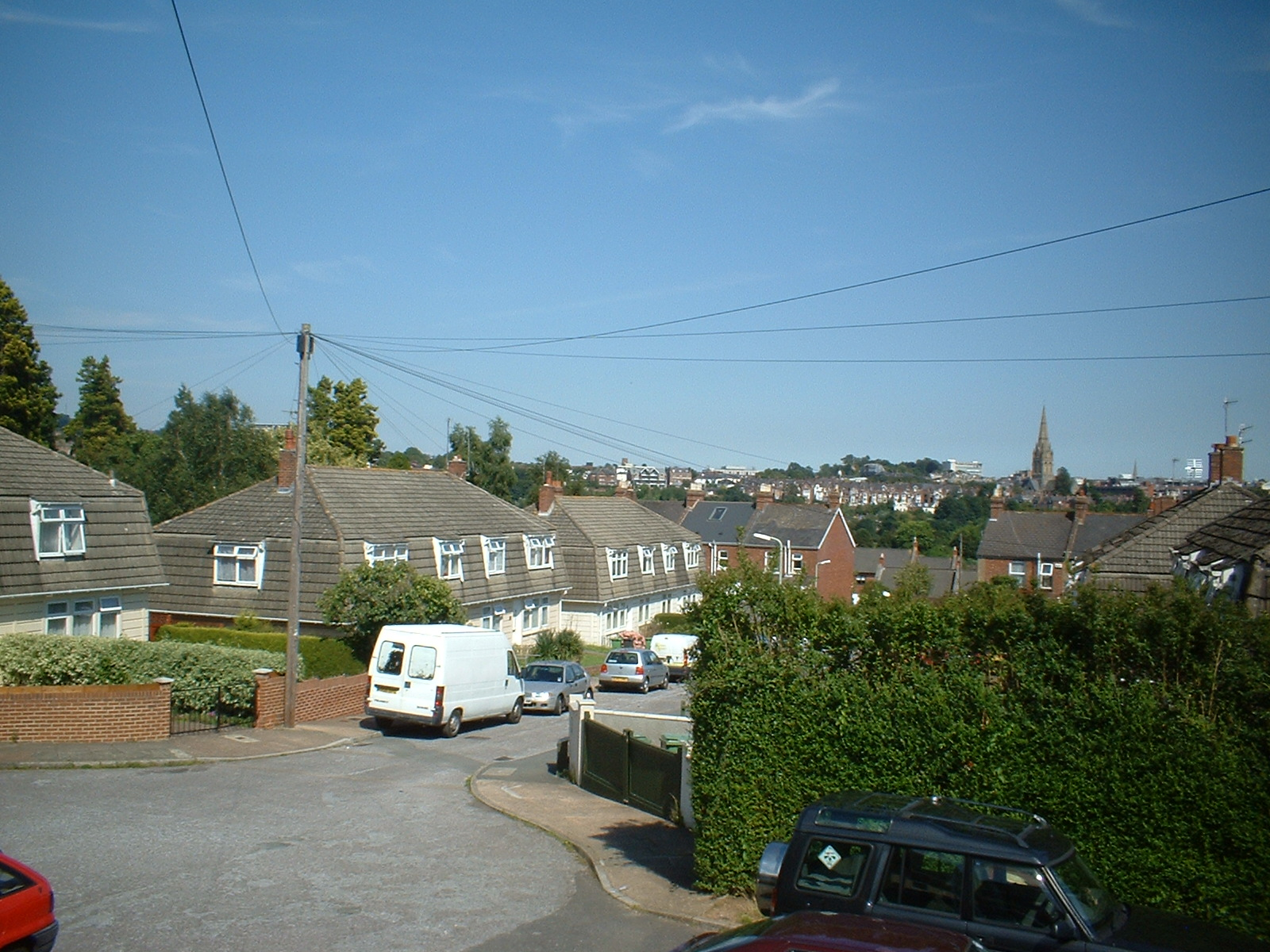
Ashleigh Close, on the outskirts of Exwick

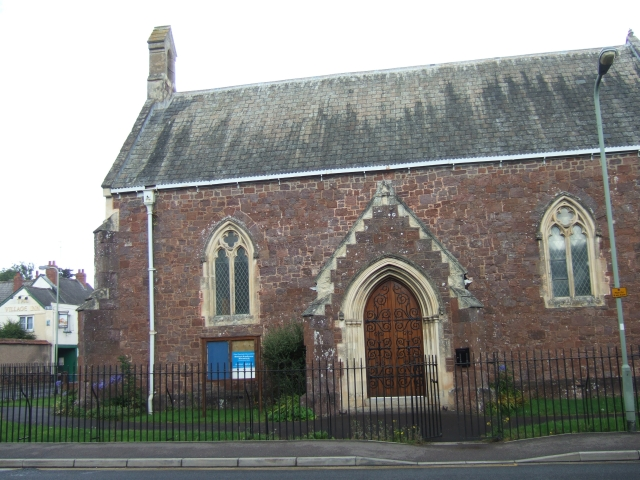
St Andrew's Church
