= Murder of Ann Heron =

British murder

Coordinates: 54.520236°N 1.494944°W

- Location: Darlington, County Durham
- Date: August 3, 1990; 36 years ago

Location of Heron's murder within County Durham

Ann Heron was a British woman who was murdered on 3 August 1990 at her home in Darlington, County Durham, by an unidentified killer. The case was heavily featured in British media as well as on the BBC programme Crimewatch in October 1990, but her murder remains unsolved.

Her husband, who was having an affair at the time, was charged with her murder in 2005 after his semen was found in samples taken from Heron's throat, but the case was subsequently dropped due to lack of evidence. He claims he has an alibi but police feel he cannot adequately account for his movements for the crucial part of the day. He remains a suspect in the case.

In 2020, a private investigator claimed that Michael Benson, an escaped prisoner who was on the run in Hampshire at the time, was a possible suspect. Jen Jarvie had watched the October 1990 edition of Crimewatch that featured Heron's murder and then watched the following month's edition, concluding that one of the criminals featured fitted her profile of the killer. However, Durham Constabulary investigated the alleged links to Benson and found there was no evidence to place Benson in the area at the time of the murder, and also revealed that they were "all but certain" he was living abroad at the time of the attack. Durham Constabulary eliminated Benson from their enquiries, concluding that he "is not and never has been a suspect".

== Background ==
Ann Heron was born Mary Ann O'Neill on 24 March 1946 in Glasgow, Scotland. Her first marriage was to Ralph Cockburn. She moved to England in the 1980s when she began a relationship with Peter Heron. Peter Heron was married when the pair first met and already had three children, but he began an affair with Ann and in 1986 he divorced his wife and married Ann in the same year. The couple lived together in Aeolian House on the outskirts of Darlington, County Durham. Peter Heron worked as a company director of a haulage firm down the road from the house. Ann Heron had a part-time job helping out as a care assistant at a local care home. Ann was unhappy living in Darlington and often missed her children from her previous marriage, who were still living in Scotland.

The free-standing Aeolian House was described as a 'conspicuous' building which was clearly visible from the busy main road which it was located next to. The A67 road it was located on was the main route from Teesside Airport to Darlington and so was heavily used. Ann was known to have felt frightened of the isolation of the house and was said to have felt wary of being alone in the property.

== Murder ==
On the morning of 3 August 1990, Heron went shopping in Darlington with a friend before returning at lunchtime. Her husband always came home for lunch and did so on the day. Ann said that she was going to spend the afternoon sunbathing in her bikini in the garden. It was the middle of the 1990 heat wave, and that day was the hottest day of the year. Peter left to go back to work at 2:00pm.

At 2:30pm a friend rang and spoke to Ann, who sounded happy and cheerful. At 3:30pm a friend on a passing bus saw Ann sunbathing in her bikini in front of the house. She had been forced to move to the front of the house to sunbathe, nearer the road, because a tractor nearby had been blowing grass towards the back garden. This was the last known sighting of Ann alive.

When Peter Heron arrived home from work at 18:00, her radio was found still on, along with her book and cigarettes. The family dog was also outside, and the house front door was open. Heron's body was found in the living room of the house. Heron was lying on the floor in a pool of blood and had a stab wound in her neck. Her bikini bottoms had been removed, which indicated that it may have been a sexually motivated killing. The weapon used had been something like a Stanley knife or a razor blade. The murder weapon was missing from the scene and was never found.

== Investigation ==
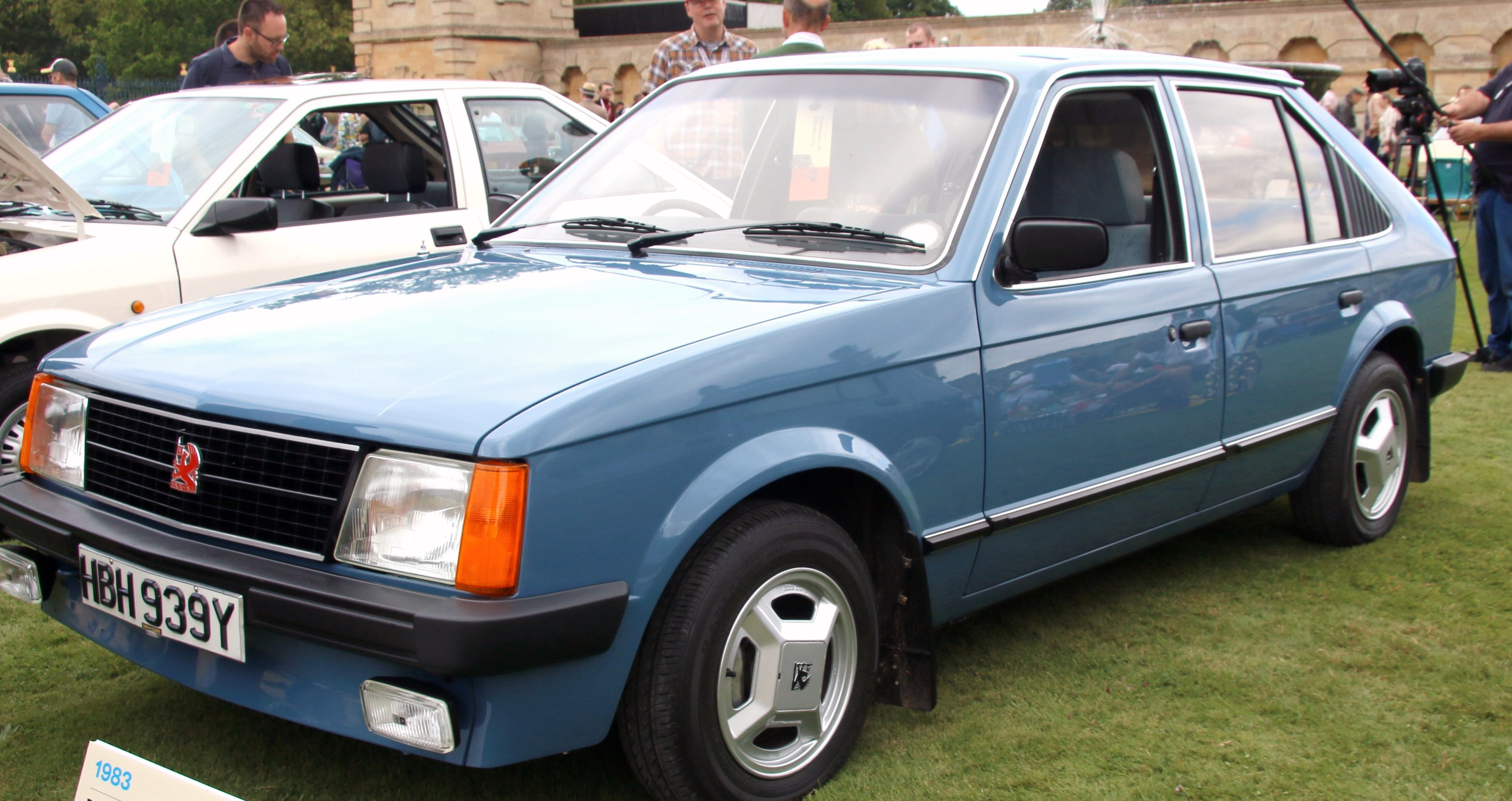
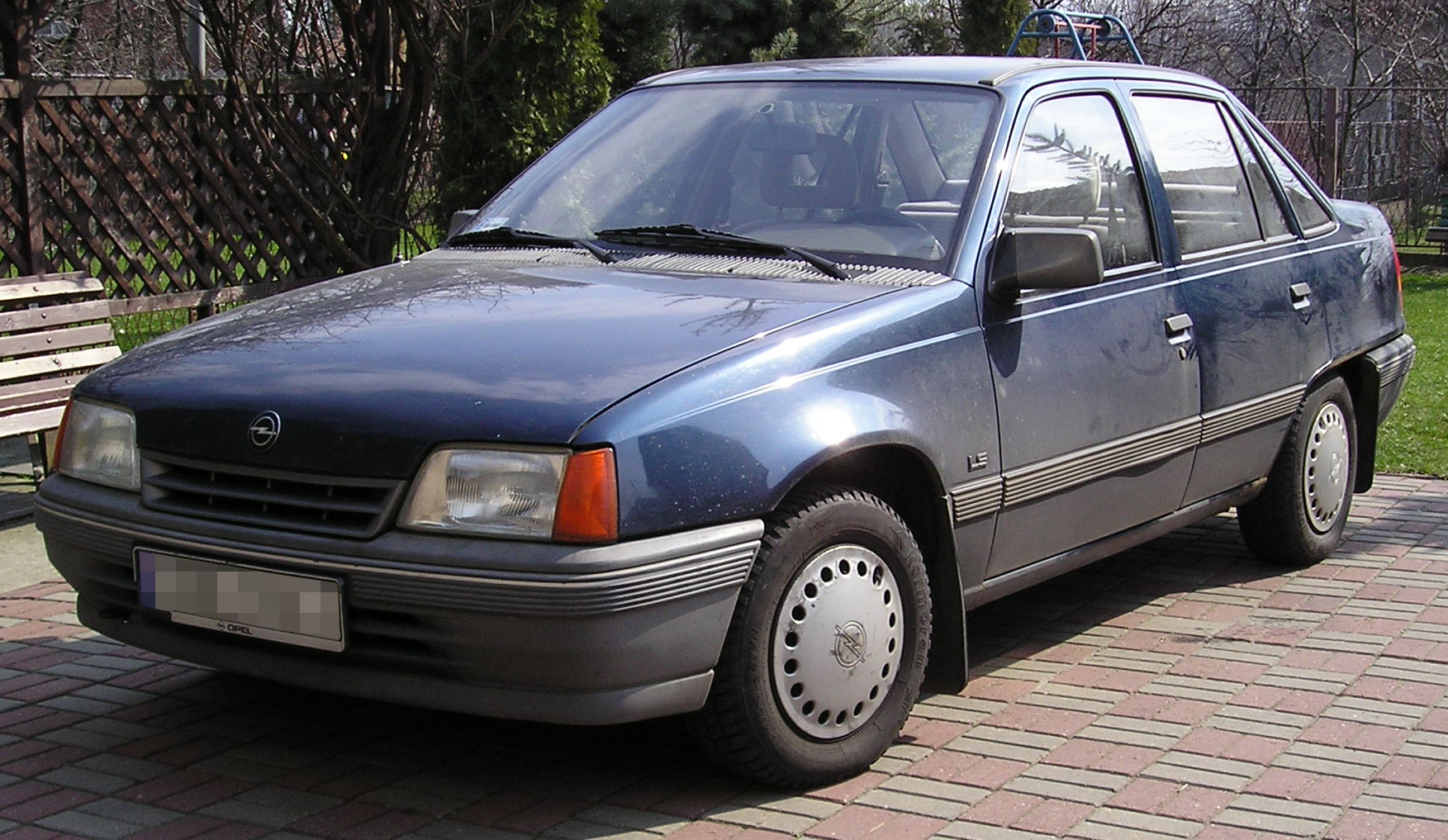
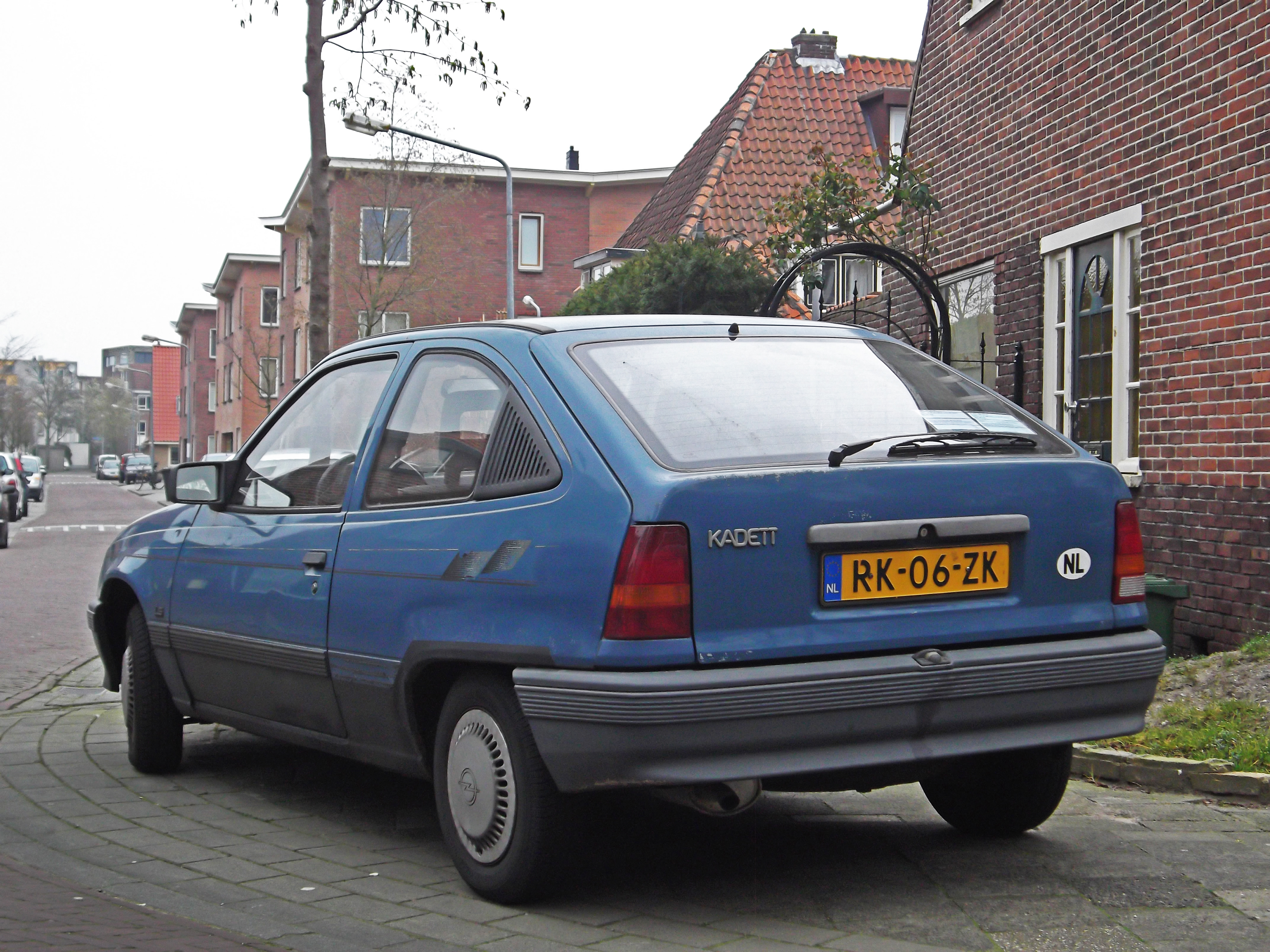
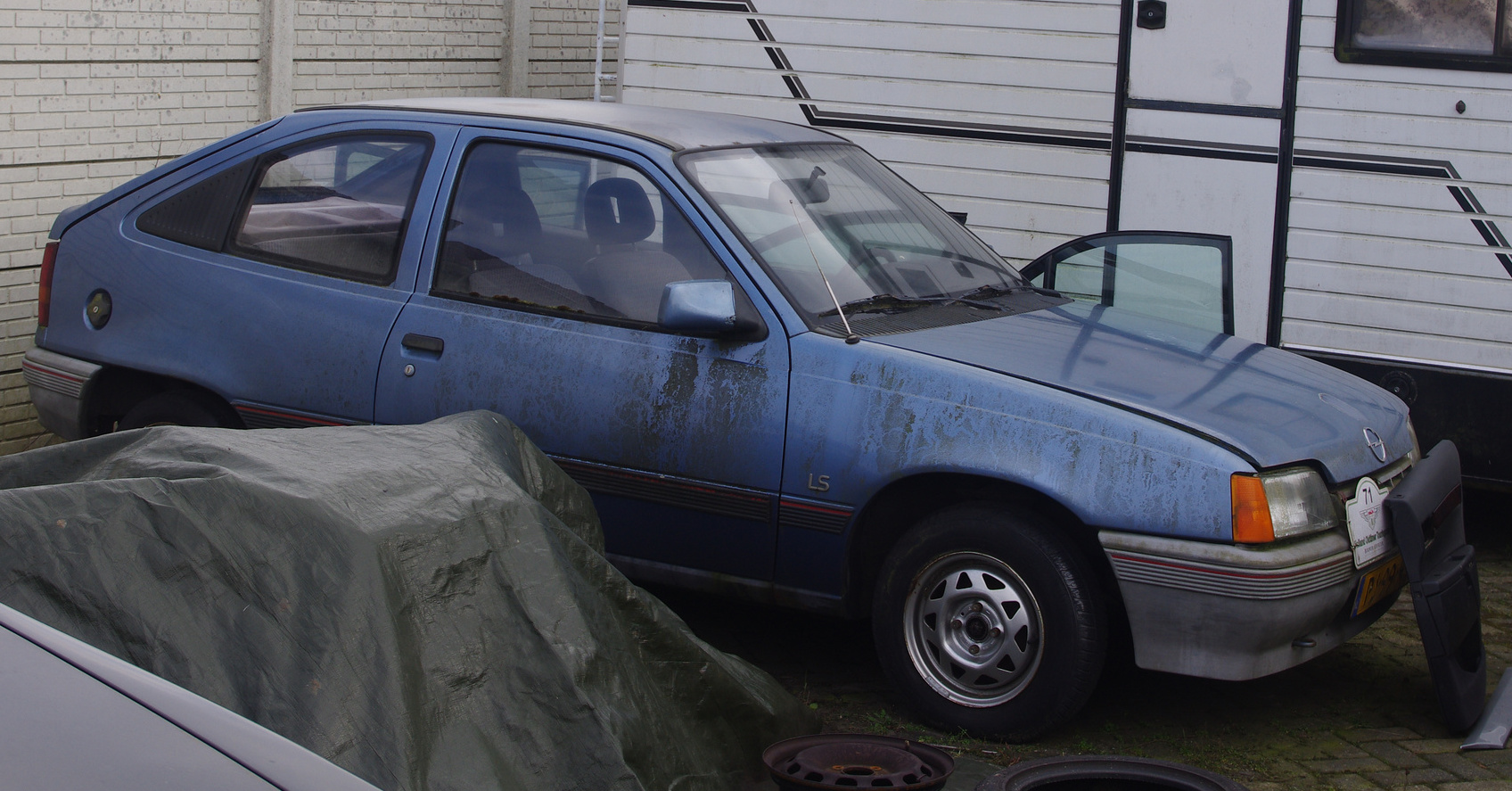
Several witnesses saw a blue car parked at Heron's house and then speeding down the driveway away from the property around the time she was murdered. In the Crimewatch appeal on her murder in October 1990, investigators stated that it was possibly a blue Astra, similar to the vehicles above.

When the police first investigated the crime, they noticed that there were no signs of a struggle either inside or outside of the house, indicating that she may have known her killer. This was supported by the fact that the family dog, which was found outside of the house when Peter arrived home, had not been heard to bark at an intruder or a stranger.

A witness came forward to say they saw a blue car, possibly a Vauxhall Astra, parked outside the house around 16:45. Witnesses also reported seeing a blue Leyland Sherpa van parked at the end of the drive some time after this. The van had a trident logo on the side, and three men were seen inside. At around 17:05, a taxi driver and two women in another car who were passing the property saw a blue car speeding down the driveway away from the house, travelling so fast that the taxi driver did not know whether it would stop and pull out in front of him. The car pulled out immediately behind him but accelerated and overtook before racing across the nearby roundabout and driving down Yarm Road into Darlington. Several other people also reported seeing the car parked at the house and speeding down the drive, and investigators believed that it was the same vehicle. Several of the witnesses gave similar descriptions of the male driver as being aged between 35 and 45 with a suntanned complexion and short dark hair.

When Heron's murder was reconstructed on Crimewatch in October 1990, the multiple sightings of the blue car were described as "obviously the most interesting of the sightings". Although said to have possibly been an Astra, it was also noted that the car could have been a Mazda, Toyota or a Vauxhall Cavalier. Police tracked down the owners of 3,500 blue cars, but the car has never been found or identified. Despite several witnesses saying they had seen the driver, a photofit was never produced of the man, with Durham Constabulary later stating that "the descriptions of both the vehicle and the person driving the vehicle differ and lacked the detail required for a photofit".

The police found no evidence of a robbery or sexual assault. Police believe Heron was murdered around 17:00. Peter Heron discovered her body at 18:00.

A witness said they thought they saw Heron driving near her home with two unidentified persons in the car around 16:15 that afternoon, but they were not certain it was Heron. However, it is likely that the witness was mistaken, as Ann was found dead in the same bikini she was seen wearing at 3:30pm, indicating she had sunbathed for the whole afternoon.

One week after the murder, it was discovered that 55-year-old Peter was having an affair at the time with a 32-year-old barmaid at the local spa club, leading some to suspect that he may have had a motive to kill Ann. Statistically most murder victims know their killers, with 62% of those murdered in England and Wales in 1988 being murdered by someone they knew, and statistics show that 37% of women murdered in the UK are killed by their husband, boyfriend or lover. Only 13% of women murdered in England and Wales in 1988 were murdered by strangers, with most women murdered at this time being killed in domestic violence situations. As Ann's husband and the person who found her body, Peter Heron hit two of the main criteria for murder suspects. Peter had left a meeting at Cleveland Bridge at 4pm and said he drove back to his office through the village of Croft-on-Tees and Middleton St. George. Detectives questioned this route because going via Croft was not the most direct or logical route from Cleveland Bridge (which is only 400m from Aeolian House). Police felt that Peter had a missing amount of time he could not account for between 4pm and 5.50pm (the time period in which the murder occurred).

By 1991, the case had gone cold, despite press conferences and a Crimewatch UK reconstruction. In December 1992, a woman told police a man came to the card shop in Darlington where she worked and boasted about killing Heron. In October 1994, the police, Peter Heron and a newspaper received a series of letters from someone claiming to be the killer. The letter to the newspaper, the Northern Echo, began "Hello editor, it's me...Ann Heron's killer!" and ended "Your readers will have plenty to talk about. Signed The Killer." Forensic tests were carried out on the letters in an attempt to establish who the author was, and handwriting samples were taken for comparison with suspects in the case.

Two years after the murder, in 1992, Peter Heron remarried. He publicly defended himself after the press questioned why he had remarried so quickly. Two uniformed officers chose to attend the wedding.

=== Questioning of Philip Hann ===
In April 1997, Durham Police questioned a convicted rapist about the murder. 29-year-old Philip Hann, who had been jailed in 1994, was taken from Wakefield Prison to Darlington to be spoken to about the killing.

=== Arrest, charging and release of husband ===
Police were adamant that scientific advances could eventually lead to the identification of the killer, and early in 2005 Durham Police brought in one of the country's foremost forensic scientists so a series of laboratory tests could be conducted. Blood traces and fingerprints found on some of the 1,500 items originally taken from the crime scene were forensically examined. This led to the arrest in November that year of Ann's husband, Peter Heron, who had remarried after the murder and relocated to a bungalow in Wishaw, Lanarkshire. His DNA was found on samples taken from his wife's body at the time of the murder. Specifically, his semen was found on samples taken from the back of Heron's throat. The Crown Prosecution Service agreed to charge him after he was interviewed a number of times, however, the case against him was subsequently dropped due to a lack of evidence. The decision was made after additional expert opinion was obtained on the scientific evidence presented, leading to an eminent barrister advising the CPS that the case should be discontinued. Durham Police insisted that Peter Heron's release would "not preclude us from going back and re-interviewing him".

Investigators subsequently announced their plans to re-examine key evidence, and in 2007 fresh forensic tests were conducted on what police described as "the crucial samples" from the crime scene. Investigators stated that advances in technology would allow some samples taken from the scene to be examined for the first time, using "super-sensitive" technology.

== Peter Heron's alibi ==
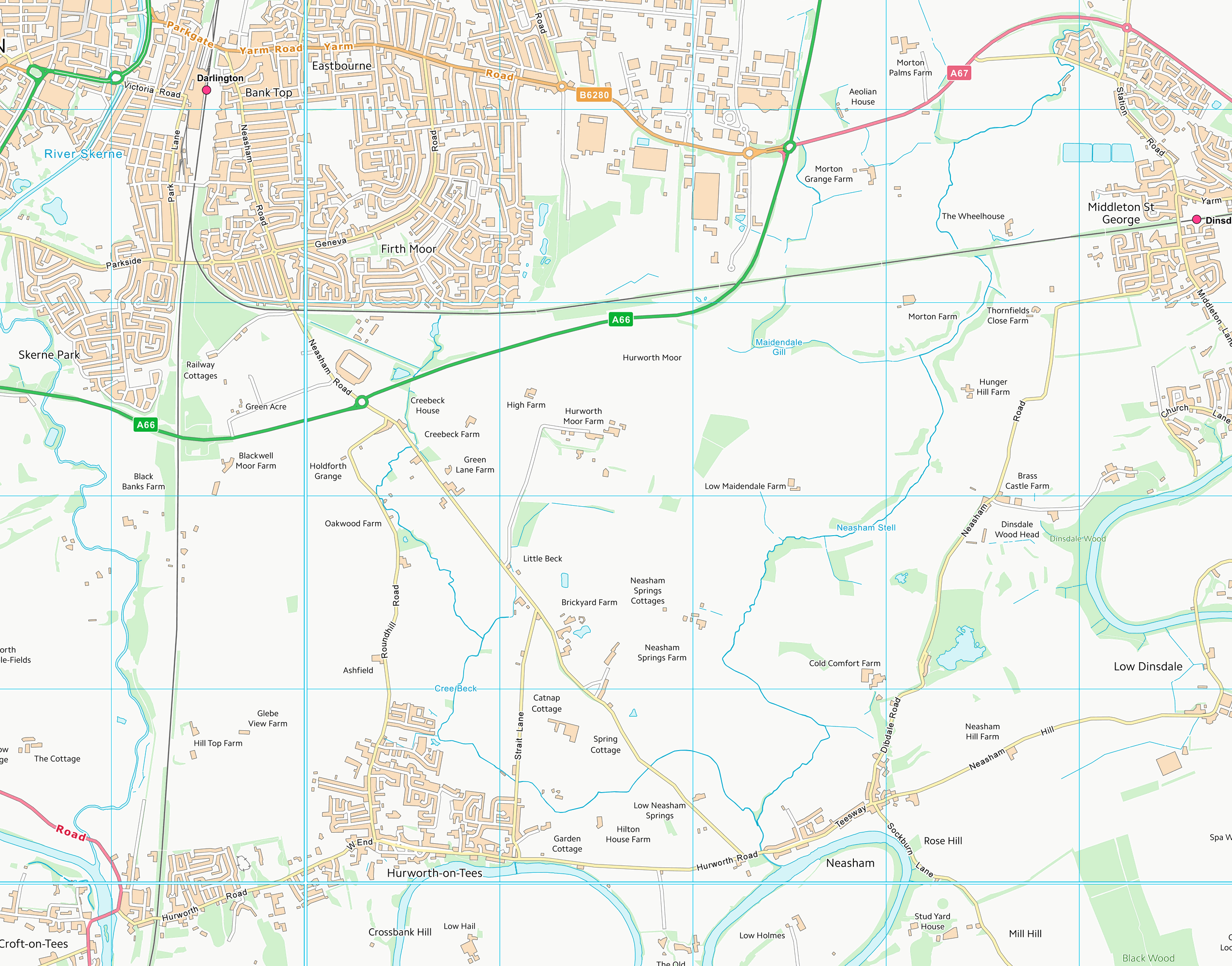
Peter Heron claimed that, after finishing a meeting at Cleveland Bridge sometime between 4:00 and 4:30 pm, he travelled back to his office in Middleton St. George by a circuitous route through the village of Croft-on-Tees, instead of simply driving there on the A67 which passes Aeolian House. Police were suspicious of his claim that he took this unusual route as the murder occurred around the time he said he was completing this journey.

Peter Heron has long claimed that he was at work at the time of the killing. However, the police feel that he cannot fully account for his movements between 4 pm and 5:50 pm, the time period in which the murder occurred, and he has given conflicting accounts over the years of the exact timings of his movements that day. He had certainly been in a meeting with clients at Cleveland Bridge at some point that afternoon, but while he previously claimed that this meeting started at 3:15 pm, his daughter testified on the 2022 Channel 5 documentary on the case that the meeting began at 3:45 pm and only lasted about half an hour. Heron had originally said it started at 3:15 pm after being told by police that a former employee of his had reported seeing him driving erratically at high speed towards the murder house at 3:15 pm. He said in 2016 that the meeting, which was taking place only 400 meters from Aeolian House, ended at approximately 4:30 pm, but his daughter said in 2022 that it ended at approximately 4:20 pm, while other sources assert it ended at around 4:00 pm. Heron had also been positively identified driving his white car around a roundabout two miles from Aeolian House between 3:50 and 3:55 pm, when he was supposedly in the meeting with the clients. In total, three separate witnesses reported during this time seeing a car which they thought may be Heron's travelling towards Aeolian House at excessively high speed, although each gave a different description of the car. Heron said that after the meeting ended he took an extremely long route back to his office through the village of Croft and Middleton St. George, meaning that he would not have driven past Aeolian House during the time period Ann Heron was murdered between 4:00 pm 5:50 pm. When police asked him why he did this, he said that he had gone to see a woman he was later found to be having a brief affair with.

== Subsequent developments ==
In 2020, an investigator, named Jen Jarvie, claimed that she had identified a man named Michael Benson, who died in 2011, as a "viable suspect". Jarvie had contacted the daughter of Peter Heron over Facebook in 2016 offering help investigating the case. After watching the October 1990 edition of Crimewatch which featured the murder, she concluded that the killer must have been a prolific offender and burglar. She watched the next month's episode and saw that Hampshire Police were searching for Leeds man Michael Benson, who had escaped from prison using his wife's blue Ford Orion. She concluded that the man fitted her profile of the killer.

Benson was described as a violent criminal with a strong criminal history of robbery, burglary and assault with a shotgun, and another with a carving knife. However, Durham Constabulary investigated the alleged links to Michael Benson and found that there was no evidence to place Benson in the area at the time of the murder, and also revealed that they were "all but certain" Benson was living abroad at the time of the attack. Detectives also have DNA samples from Benson's family members to compare to the crime scene evidence. In May 2022 Durham Constabulary ruled out a connection to Benson, stating that he "is not and never has been a suspect". Durham Constabulary also voluntarily referred itself to the Independent Office for Police Conduct in response to allegations against them.

In a 2022 Channel 5 documentary on the murder, Durham Constabulary revealed that Peter Heron, along with various unnamed individuals was still a suspect in the case.

== In popular culture ==
The episode of Crimewatch which reconstructed the murder was shown in October 1990.

The site of the murder, Aeolian House, featured in a 2003 Channel 4 documentary titled Blood Under the Carpet. The show focused on people who live at murder scenes and documented the lives of Andy and Louise Bloomfield, who had moved in to Aeolian House and set up a boarding kennels for cats and dogs.

Heron's murder was the subject of a 2021 Crime+ Investigation podcast. The episode, titled The Murder of Ann Heron: Darlington, was published as a part of the podcast series spin-off to the documentary show Murdertown.

In May 2022, Channel 5 aired a two-hour documentary on Heron's murder, titled The Mysterious Murder of Ann Heron. Peter Heron agreed to be interviewed for the documentary and protested his innocence.

== See also ==
- Murder of Nisha Patel-Nasri – 2006 UK case in which the victim's husband, who was also having an affair, secretly arranged his wife's murder while he was out of the house
- Chris Clark – author who has claimed Heron's murder could be linked to Christopher Halliwell
- Murders of Kate Bushell and Lyn Bryant – two other UK unsolved murders in the 90s in which witnesses reported seeing a mysterious blue Vauxhall Astra at the scene
- Murder of Billie-Jo Jenkins – similar 1997 UK murder case
- Disappearance of Suzy Lamplugh – one of Britain's most famous unsolved murders
- Murder of Eve Stratford
- Murder of Lindsay Rimer – another infamous unsolved murder in England which occurred in 1994
