= Murder of Colette Aram =

1983 murder of a British teenager

Colette Aram
- Born: 3 February 1967
- Died: 30 October 1983 (aged 16); Keyworth, Nottinghamshire, United Kingdom
- Cause of death: Strangulation
- Occupation: Trainee hairdresser

Colette Aram (3 February 1967 – 30 October 1983) was a 16-year-old British trainee hairdresser who was abducted, raped and strangled as she walked from her home to her boyfriend's house in Keyworth, Nottinghamshire, on 30 October 1983. The murder was the first case to be featured on the BBC television series Crimewatch when it began in June 1984. However, despite receiving over 400 calls as a result of the programme, Nottinghamshire Police were unable to catch the killer, and it was not until 2008 and following advances in forensic technology that police were able to develop a DNA profile of the suspect. Paul Stewart Hutchinson was finally charged with the murder in April 2009. He initially pleaded not guilty, but changed his plea to guilty on 21 December 2009 and was sentenced to life imprisonment on 25 January 2010. Following his sentencing, Crimewatch ran a recap of the murder and investigation on BBC TV on 27 January 2010 exposing several inaccuracies reported in the press about his background, notably a lie about being a psychology graduate.

== Disappearance and investigation ==
Colette when she did not arrive at her boyfriend's house, and after a series of frantic phone calls, police were called at 10:30 p.m. to help family and friends search for Aram. At 9:00 a.m. the following morning her naked body was found dumped in a field about a mile and a half from where she had been abducted. She had been raped and strangled.

Police launched a murder investigation, and on 7 June 1984 the murder of Colette Aram was the first case to be featured on the newly launched BBC television series Crimewatch, a programme which reconstructs major unsolved crimes with a view to gaining information from members of the public. As a result of the appeal, police received 400 tip-offs and were able to eliminate 1,500 suspects from their enquiries. However, the killer remained at large. The case was featured for a second time on Crimewatch's 20th anniversary show in 2004.

In 2008, advances in forensic technology allowed Nottinghamshire Police to put together a DNA profile of the killer, and officers appealed for members of the public to come forward with the names of suspects who could then be DNA tested using a mouth swab. A similar appeal had been made in the hunt for the M25 rapist and had proved successful. Police received more than 100 calls from members of the public.

== Arrest of suspect ==
In June 2008 a young man, Jean-Paul Hutchinson, was arrested on a motoring charge. DNA swabs are routinely taken from anyone who is arrested, and his DNA was a near identical match to the profile of the killer of Colette Aram. However, Jean-Paul was only 20 years old at the time of his arrest and DNA swab, so he had not been born at the time of the murder. The match provided the police with the breakthrough needed to solve the case.

Paul Stewart Hutchinson, father of Jean-Paul and then aged 50, was arrested and charged with the murder in April 2009. Initially, Hutchinson tried to blame the murder on his late brother Gerhard (or Gerard), who had died in January 2008 and been cremated, but DNA tests ruled Gerhard (or Gerard) out, as his DNA was held on a hospital blood sample and didn't match that left at the scene. Hutchinson was held on remand after his arrest and entered a plea of not guilty on 5 October, but changed his plea to guilty at a pre-trial hearing on 21 December 2009.

== Sentencing and death ==
On 25 January 2010, Hutchinson was sentenced to life with a minimum of 25 years at Nottingham Crown Court for the murder of Colette Aram. Aram's mother, Jacqui Kirkby, said Hutchinson's sentencing brought some relief, but the family next needed to know why she was murdered – a question Hutchinson refused to answer.

At 8:00 a.m. on 10 October 2010, 9 months after his sentencing and after 18 months in custody, Hutchinson was found unconscious in his cell at Nottingham Prison. Paramedics were called and tried to resuscitate him. He died at 9:58 a.m. in an ambulance on the way to hospital. It is believed he took an overdose of medication, but a post mortem examination was inconclusive. Hutchinson's daughter told the inquest he had asked his wife to come and meet him in prison the day before he died, but she did not attend the meeting.

== See also ==
- List of kidnappings
- Antoni Imiela, who was caught using a similar DNA profiling method
- Joseph Kappen, a Welsh serial killer identified in 2002 with the same familial DNA profiling technique used to catch Aram's killer
- Murder of Claire Woolterton – infamous 1981 UK cold case murder of a girl solved with DNA in 2013

UK cold cases where the offender's DNA is known:

- Murder of Deborah Linsley
- Murders of Eve Stratford and Lynne Weedon
- Murder of Julie Pacey
- Murders of Jacqueline Ansell-Lamb and Barbara Mayo
- Murder of Lindsay Rimer
- Murder of Lyn Bryant
- Murder of Janet Brown
- Murder of Sheila Anderson
- Murder of Lisa Hession
- Murder of Linda Cook
- Murder of Melanie Hall
- Batman rapist, subject to Britain's longest-running serial rape investigation
