= Murder of Nikki Allan =

1992 child murder in Sunderland, England

- Portrait of Nikki Allan
- Location: Sunderland, Tyne and Wear, England
- Date: 7 October 1992
- Attack type: Blunt force trauma, stabbing
- Deaths: 1
- Charges: Murder
- Convicted: David Boyd
- Judge: Mrs Justice Lambert

On 7 October 1992, Nikki Allan, a seven-year-old English girl, was murdered by David Boyd who "beat her about the head with a brick" shattering her skull and stabbed her multiple times, inside the derelict Old Exchange Building in Sunderland, Tyne and Wear, England. The following day, Allan's body was found in the basement room. George Heron was acquitted of the murder in 1993. Boyd was found guilty of Allan's murder in 2023 and was sentenced to life imprisonment with a minimum term of 29 years.

== Background ==
Nikki Allan was a seven-year-old English girl who lived on a council estate in Wear Garth, Sunderland, Tyne and Wear, North East England, with her mother Sharon Henderson, stepfather, sister and two half-sisters.

== Murder ==
On 7 October 1992, Allan was walking home from her grandfather's flat on the same estate when she disappeared. She set off at 8:30pm. When Henderson arrived home, Allan was nowhere to be seen. More than 100 neighbours helped to search for Allan. The following day, Allan's shoes and coat were spotted outside the nearby derelict Quayside Old Exchange building in High Street East, Sunderland. Her body was found inside the basement of the building with 37 stab wounds and her head had been bludgeoned by a brick.

== Legal proceedings against George Heron ==
In late 1993, George Heron, a young man who lived near Allan's home, stood trial at Leeds Crown Court for Allan's murder. A knife matching the stab wounds was found in Heron's lodgings. Blood splatters were also found on Heron's shoes and clothing. Heron's sister told police that after he had returned home on the night of the murder he had gone straight to the bathroom for a "good half hour", something which Heron would not usually do. He had gone to the bathroom to wash both himself and his clothes. Heron had denied being out on the evening of the murder, although four witnesses said that they had seen a man at the Boar's Head pub and the Clarendon pub who matched his description. He was seen buying cheese and onion crisps, which were Allan's favourite crisps, and police believed that he had used these to lure Allan into the building. After three days of questioning, Heron confessed to the murder, although he had previously denied the murder 120 times. The evidence against Heron was circumstantial. However, police believed that a conviction would be secured.

The case against Heron collapsed after the judge ruled that Heron's taped confession to the murder was inadmissible in court. The judge blamed "heavy-handed police tactics" for this outcome. Heron was found not guilty of Allan's murder and was given a change of identity and was moved out of Sunderland.

In 1994, Henderson brought a civil case against Heron. She charged Heron with, "battery on a child, resulting in her death." A court found this to be in her favour and ordered him to pay her more than £7,000. He was unable to be traced which meant that the money was never paid. In May 2023, Northumbria Police apologised to him.

== Investigation ==
In February 2014, imprisoned serial killer Steven Grieveson was arrested on suspicion of Allan's murder. He was questioned and was later told that he would face no further action.

In May 2016, a woman contacted Henderson claiming to have new information about the murder. The woman, who was twelve years old at the time of the murder and had been babysitting nearby at the time Allan disappeared, spoke to police. In September the same year, Henderson called for a full reinvestigation of the crime. She launched an online petition urging Northumbria Police to carry out a "top-to-bottom" review of the case. This petition attracted more than 500 signatures in less than 24 hours. The following month, Henderson contacted Grieveson, asking him to share anything that he may know about Allan's death. In April 2017, Henderson met Northumbria Police Chief Constable Steve Ashman and Detective Chief Inspector Lisa Theaker. They restated their determination to "bring Nikki's killer to justice." In October 2017, police said that they had successfully recovered a DNA sample from an unknown male.

On 17 April 2018, Northumbria Police raided a house in the Stockton area of Teesside and arrested a man on suspicion of Allan's murder. Two years later in April 2020, Henderson was contacted by a stranger saying that she could have information about Allan's murder.

== Arrest and trial of David Boyd ==
The man arrested in 2018 was charged with the murder in 2022. He was named as 54-year-old David Thomas Boyd. He appeared at Newcastle Crown Court on 24 May 2022 and was remanded in custody. On 20 June 2022, Boyd appeared at Newcastle Crown Court via videolink and pleaded not guilty to the murder.

On 20 April 2023, the trial of Boyd began at Newcastle Crown Court. The prosecution alleged that he had lured Allan to some wasteland next to the River Wear, where she was struck in the head, causing her to bleed. A witness stated that they did not see Allan being abducted, but that she was "skipping" to catch up with a man. The prosecution then said that the man had then forced Allan through an opening in a boarded up window of the derelict Old Exchange building. The man had then "beat her about the head with a brick" and had shattered her skull. She was then subsequently stabbed multiple times through her chest, heart and lungs. A post-mortem examination revealed that Allan had suffered "blunt force trauma" to the head which was believed to have knocked her unconscious before she was stabbed. A witness said that at around 22:00 he had heard a loud scream which "fixed the time of the killing." Allan's body was found the next day dumped in the basement of the building, the body was discovered by two volunteers who had joined the search for Allan. During the trial, it was reported that at the time of the murder, David Boyd was known as David Smith or David Bell and was aged 25. At the time of the murder Boyd had been the partner of Caroline Branton, who occasionally babysat for Allan. The case was described as "circumstantial but compelling" due to the fact that Boyd's DNA had been found on Allan's clothing. Boyd suggested to police that the DNA may have been there because she had wiped her hands in his saliva and had smeared it onto her clothes after he had spat off his balcony that night and that it may have hit Allan. It was also reported that Boyd "knew the layout" of the Old Exchange building and that he had used the same window a few days before when he took a boy there to search for pigeons. Boyd had misled police about his whereabouts on the night of the murder, claiming he had gone to the fish and chip shop an hour before he actually had, and was said to physically resemble the sketch of the man eyewitnesses had seen walking with Nikki Allan.

David Boyd had been convicted in March 2000 of indecent assault of a young girl at a park in Stockton that took place on 8 April 1999. Boyd had also been convicted of breaching the peace in 1986 in which he had approached four children in Sacriston, County Durham and grabbed a ten-year-old girl. Boyd furthermore admitted to harbouring a paedophilic attraction towards young girls.

During the trial, the defence alleged that the "various strands of evidence don't prove" and that they were the "result of innocent coincidences." The defence also highlighted the fact that the murder showed no evidence of a sexual motive, making Boyd's prior convictions and admitted sexual interest in young girls irrelevant to the case. Mrs Justice Christina Lambert told the jury that the case relied on "circumstantial evidence" and that there was "no direct evidence" of Boyd's guilt. Later on in the trial, it was reported that Boyd would not be giving evidence.

On 12 May 2023, Boyd was found guilty of the murder of Allan. It took the jury of 10 women and two men two and a half hours of deliberating to convict Boyd. Henderson spoke to BBC News about the 30-year wait for justice. On 23 May 2023, Boyd was sentenced to life imprisonment with a minimum term of 29 years before becoming eligible for release on parole. Boyd will become eligible to apply for parole on 16 August 2049.

In August 2023, it was reported that Henderson was to sue Northumbria Police over her 30-year wait for the conviction of Boyd. In September 2023, it was reported that the police investigation which took 30 years to identify Boyd as Allan's killer would be the subject of a review by either the Independent Office for Police Conduct (IOPC) or another police force. It was also reported that Boyd was to appeal his conviction and sentence. In October 2024, it was reported that an appeal made by Boyd against his conviction and sentence had been rejected.

== See also ==
Other (still unsolved) UK cold cases where the offender's DNA is known:

- List of solved missing person cases: 1950–1999
- Murder of Deborah Linsley
- Murders of Eve Stratford and Lynne Weedon
- Murder of Lisa Hession
- Murders of Jacqueline Ansell-Lamb and Barbara Mayo
- Murder of Lindsay Rimer
- Murder of Julie Pacey
- Murder of Janet Brown
- Murder of Sheila Anderson
- Murder of Linda Cook
- Murder of Melanie Hall
- Batman rapist – subject to Britain's longest-running serial rape investigation
