= Crimewatch =

British television programme produced by the BBC

- Also known as: Crimewatch UK
- Genre: Factual
- Based on: Aktenzeichen XY... ungelöst
- Presented by: Nick Ross; Sue Cook; David Hatcher; Helen Phelps; Jacqui Hames; Pattie Coldwell; Jill Dando; Fiona Bruce; Rav Wilding; Kirsty Young; Matthew Amroliwala; Martin Bayfield; Jason Mohammad; Sophie Raworth; Jeremy Vine; Tina Daheley
- Opening theme: "Rescue Helicopter"
- Composer: John Cameron
- Country of origin: United Kingdom
- Original language: English
- No. of series: 33
- No. of episodes: 321 (list of episodes)

Production
- Executive producer: Joe Mather
- Production locations: Television Centre, London (1984–2010); Broadcasting House, Cardiff (2011–2016); Various (2016–2017)
- Running time: 60 minutes
- Production companies: BBC Studios; BBC Cymru Wales

Original release
- Network: BBC One
- Release: 7 June 1984 – 20 March 2017

Related
- Crime Limited; Crimewatch File; Crimewatch Solved; Crimewatch Live

Crimewatch (formerly Crimewatch UK) is a British television programme produced by the BBC, that reconstructs major unsolved crimes in order to gain information from the public which may assist in solving the case. The programme was originally broadcast once a month in a primetime slot on BBC One, although in the final years before its relaunch in September 2016 it was usually broadcast roughly once every two months.

Crimewatch was first broadcast on 7 June 1984, and is based on the German TV show Aktenzeichen XY... ungelöst (which translates as File Reference XY... Unsolved). Nick Ross and Sue Cook presented the show for the first eleven years, until Cook's departure in June 1995. Cook was replaced by Jill Dando. After Dando was murdered in April 1999, Ross hosted Crimewatch alone until January 2000, when Fiona Bruce joined the show.

Kirsty Young and Matthew Amroliwala replaced Ross and Bruce following their departures in 2007. The BBC announced on 15 October 2008 that they would move production of shows such as Crimewatch to studios in Cardiff. The move took place in January 2011. Young and Amroliwala remained as the lead presenters until 2015. Following a brief period with guest presenter Sophie Raworth in 2016, it was announced that the show would relaunch in September 2016 with a new weekly format. The new presenters were announced as Jeremy Vine and Tina Daheley. The new series began on 5 September 2016, with the final episode broadcast on 20 March 2017.

In October 2017, the BBC announced that the main Crimewatch series had been cancelled, citing declining viewership. The daytime spin-off series Crimewatch Roadshow (now Crimewatch Live) would continue to air, but will also air more episodes per year. Over 40 years, more than 700 programmes have been broadcast with 7,000 appeals made on behalf of British police.

== History ==
The idea for the show came from the UK programme Police 5 and the German Aktenzeichen XY... ungelöst (File Reference XY... Unsolved). Producers viewed the shows and rejected the overt reconstructions with music to build suspense in America's Most Wanted, and were also against the idea of filming the reconstruction from the perspective of the offender as in Aktenzeichen XY... ungelöst (particularly for sexual assaults). However, they favoured the idea of audience participation in the show.

Originally, Crimewatch UK (as it was then known) was due to run for only three programmes. It was regarded as an experiment when it was first shown due to doubts that the police would take part and scepticism as to whether witnesses and victims would welcome the idea. There was also concern that it could be considered to prejudice a jury. The cases featured on the first programme included three murders, a stamp theft in London and some forged car documents. In over 25 years, 57 murderers, 53 rapists and sex offenders, 18 paedophiles, and others were captured as a direct result of Crimewatch appeals.

The original theme music was "Rescue Helicopter" (1980) by John Cameron (Bruton Music).

== Show format ==
=== Main programme ===
Logo used after the show's name dropped the "UK" suffix (2008–2014)

Crimewatch used to be shown once a month on BBC One. The start time varied slightly but it was generally aired for 45–50 minutes before being extended to an hour in the early 2000s. In the early years it followed the BBC Nine O'Clock News starting at around 9.30pm but in the mid to late 1990s was often moved to 10pm, always with a short Crimewatch Update programme airing later that evening (sometimes as late as after midnight due to scheduling). In June 1986, there was no edition of the programme due to World Cup football coverage from Mexico. In January 1987, the Grandstand studio was used for that month's edition due to a strike by the set designers. In later years, following the move of the flagship evening news programme, the main show was now aired at 9pm for an hour with Crimewatch Update now airing sometime after the BBC Ten O'Clock News. In 2006, the show's name dropped the "UK" suffix. Since March 2011 the show aired less frequently, roughly once every two months.

It featured approximately three or four cases per show, with each case featuring reconstructions of the crime. It was one of the largest live factual studio productions. The films shown often feature interviews with senior detectives and/or relatives or friends of victims. Key evidence is usually shown, such as E-FIT profiles of suspects and details of certain lines of enquiry.

Other features to the show included a "CCTV section", which showed crimes caught on CCTV with enhanced imagery of suspects. A "Wanted Faces" section was also featured: eight close-up pictures of suspects police are trying to trace are shown on screen. This section also frequently involves information about suspects, including aliases. These eight photos are shown upon the programme's closing credits, one of the few programmes in which the BBC do not 'show the credits in reduced size'.

Viewers could contact Crimewatch by phoning 0500 600 600, with the phone lines remaining open until midnight the night following the programme. Viewers could also send text messages to 63399. Due to the high demand for cases to be shown on the programme, many other cases are added to the Crimewatch website. These are joined by reconstructions, CCTV footage and wanted faces that have been shown on previous programmes. All reconstructions, CCTV footage, faces and cases remain on the Crimewatch website until the criminals are caught or suspects convicted. Crimewatch could be watched on the BBC iPlayer catch-up service for only 24 hours from broadcast due to legal reasons.

=== Crimewatch Update ===
Following the main programme, there was a 10–15 minute follow-up after the BBC News at Ten, with updates on calls and results from the earlier broadcast. This was removed when the show relaunched in September 2016. From the start of the fourth series in October 1987, additional updates were also featured as part of the following morning's edition of Open Air but later moved into magazine programme Daytime Live (a replacement for Pebble Mill at One) from November 1989 until May 1990.

== Police involvement ==
Despite initial police concerns about involvement (only three forces out of more than 40 agreed to participate initially), Crimewatch developed a special status with police and was credited with an expertise of its own, notably through Nick Ross' long experience with public appeals. Unlike the American equivalent, America's Most Wanted, Crimewatch itself usually appeals for unsolved cases inviting viewers to be armchair detectives. According to the producers, about a third of its cases are solved, half of those as a direct result of viewers' calls. Its successes have included some of Britain's most notorious crimes, including the kidnap of Stephanie Slater and murder of Julie Dart, the M25 rapist, the road-rage killing by Kenneth Noye, and the capture of two boys for the abduction and murder of James Bulger. Over the years, Crimewatch has featured appeals from all 43 police forces in the country.

Several police officers have appeared on the programme from the studio, including David Hatcher, Helen Phelps, Jeremy Paine, Jacqui Hames, Jonathan Morrison, Jane Corrigan, and Rav Wilding. For many years the programme also included antiques experts John Bly, Eric Knowles and Paul Hayes to help with 'treasure trove' details of recovered goods believed to have been stolen.

== Ratings and public response ==
At its peak, Crimewatch was seen by fourteen million viewers per week. However, by 2017, credited to competition from other programmes, it had fallen to an average of three million. At the time of the programme's 150th episode in January 1999, it was reported that the average viewing figures were eight million. Ratings began to decline further in the 2000s but remained competitive. In January 2008, the first episode to feature Young as presenter attracted 4.5 million viewers.

A study by the Broadcasting Standards Council found that Crimewatch increased the fear of crime in over half of its respondents, and a third said it made them feel "afraid". However, according to John Sears, senior English lecturer at Manchester Metropolitan University, it provides a beneficial role, performing "a social function by helping to solve crime, and drawing on the collective responsibilities, experiences and knowledge of the viewing audience in order to do so."

== Presenters ==
=== Lead presenters ===
Presenter	Year	Additional information
Nick Ross	1984–2007	The main anchor and longest-serving presenter of the series since its inception. His catchphrase, "Don't have nightmares, do sleep well" (which closed out most episodes), became a household phrase and was often spoofed in numerous other TV shows. During his time on the show, he had three co-presenters: Sue Cook, Jill Dando and Fiona Bruce. From May 1999 until January 2000, Ross presented the show alone following the murder of Jill Dando. He left the programme in July 2007 to concentrate on other broadcasting projects.
Sue Cook	1984–1995	British broadcaster and author, and first co-presenter of the series. Unlike her successors, Cook acted more as a second main anchor, sometimes presenting a larger segment of the programme than Ross. Cook left the series in June 1995 to focus on other broadcasting projects.
Jill Dando	1995–1999	British broadcaster and newsreader. Second co-presenter of the series, appointed following Sue Cook's departure. The edition of Crimewatch broadcast on 20 April 1999 would be Dando's last; she was murdered six days later (26 April). Her murder was reconstructed on the May 1999 programme, where an appeal for witnesses was made. Calls made by viewers initially draw the police onto a new line of enquiry, in which they identified suspect Barry George, who was later convicted of the killing, but was acquitted in August 2008 following an appeal. No further appeals for information were ever made on the programme, and the murder remains unsolved to this day.
Fiona Bruce	2000–2007	British broadcaster and newsreader. Third co-presenter of the series, appointed in January 2000 following the murder of Jill Dando the previous year. Bruce co-hosted with Ross until his departure in July 2007, but left the show in December 2007 to host Antiques Roadshow.
Kirsty Young	2008–2015	Former newsreader for ITV and Channel Five who became the main anchor of the show in January 2008. Young departed the series in December 2015 after seven years.
Matthew Amroliwala	2008–2015	British newsreader who became the show's fourth co-presenter, Amroliwala hosted both the "How they were caught" and "update" segments. He left the show in March 2015 to focus on his other role of international affairs correspondent for BBC News.
Martin Bayfield	2012–2016	Former rugby player and policeman turned sports commentator, who took over from Rav Wilding in January 2012 as the presenter of the "Caught on Camera" segment. Bayfield was the only remaining full-time presenter on the show when the BBC chose to reboot the format, and did not return.
Jason Mohammad	2015–2016	British rugby commentator and journalist, who initially took over from Amroliwala for two months on a temporary basis, before returning in October 2015 as a full-time presenter. Mohammad did not return to the show when the format was rebooted in September 2016.
Jeremy Vine	2016–2017	British newsreader, presenter and journalist who took over as main anchor as part of a new rebooted format in September 2016, which saw the programme travel across the country and broadcast from the scene of one of the main appeals featured in the episode.
Tina Daheley	2016–2017	British newsreader and former BBC Radio 1 journalist who took over as co-presenter in September 2016, taking over the roles of both Mohammad and Bayfield, presenting the "Caught on Camera", "How they were caught" and "update" segments.

=== Police officers ===
Presenter	Year	Additional information
Chief Supt. David Hatcher	1984–1999	At the time of his appointment a Chief Inspector, Hatcher presented the "Photocall" and "Incident Desk" sections for 15 years. The first and longest-serving police officer to feature on the programme, Hatcher retired from the programme in July 1999 and the force in 2004, having reached the rank of Chief Superintendent. During his time on the show, he had two co-presenters: PC Helen Phelps and later DS Jacqui Hames and was replaced by DCS Jeremy Paine.
PC Helen Phelps	1984–1989	Co-presenter of the "Photocall" and "Incident Desk" sections alongside David Hatcher for six years. Phelps' last appearance as a co-presenter was in March 1989; she subsequently left the police to become a researcher for the programme and was eventually replaced by Jacqui Hames a year later.
DS Jacqui Hames	1990–2006	Succeeded Helen Phelps as co-presenter of the 'Photocall' section alongside David Hatcher. Remained with the show for 16 years, before quitting in 2005. Hames made her last appearance on the programme in January 2006. Co-presented the Friday episode of Crimewatch Roadshow in 2013.
DCS Jeremy Paine	1999–2005	Joined the show in September 1999; previously appeared as a Senior Investigating Officer. Paine made his last appearance on the programme in April 2005.
PC Jonathan Morrison	2004–2005	Morrsion joined in May 2004 and was the first ethnic police presenter in the programme's history, but left in April 2005.
Rav Wilding	2004–2011	A Detective Constable at the time of joining the show in June 2004 on its 20th anniversary, Wilding hosted a segment entitled "Caught on Camera", which replaced the previously featured "Photocall" section. Wilding departed the main show in December 2011, but continues to present the daytime spin-off series.
DS Jane Corrigan	2006–2007	Succeeded Hames as co-presenter alongside Wilding but did not return in 2008; also appeared on Crimewatch Roadshow.

=== Stand-in presenters ===
Presenter	Year	Additional information
Pattie Coldwell	1988	Co-presented episode broadcast in April 1988 as Sue Cook was on maternity leave.
Sian Williams	2012, 2015	Williams acted as main anchor in episodes broadcast in July 2012, May 2015 and October 2015, as Kirsty Young was unavailable.
Sonali Shah	2015	Presented four shows in the wake of Amroliwala's departure, before Jason Mohammad was appointed as a main presenter.
Sophie Raworth	2012, 2016	Took over as temporary main anchor following Kirsty Young's departure. She presented the first three shows of 2016, before the show was taken off-air and rebooted with Jeremy Vine as main anchor.

== Featured cases ==
=== Victims ===
Title	Notes	Airdate
The murder of Sheila Anderson		26 February 2009, 30 March 2009
The murder of Colette Aram	The first case to be featured on the show	7 June 1984
The death of Helen Bailey		
The murder of Penny Bell	One of Britain's most famous unsolved murders	12 September 1991
The disappearance of Lee Boxell		
The murder of Emma Caldwell		15 June 2005
The murder of Deborah Linsley		14 April 1988
The murder of Sally Anne Bowman		
The murder of Janet Brown		18 May 1995
The murder of James Bulger		18 February 1993
The murder of Jill Dando		18 May 1999
The murder of Milly Dowler		
The disappearance of Charlene Downes		4 December 2014
The murder of Caroline Glachan		1996 and September 2016
The murder of Helen Gorrie		15 October 1992
The murder of Daniel Handley		
The murder of Ann Heron		4 October 1990
The murder of Danielle Jones		
The murder of Rhys Jones		
The murder of Sophie Lancaster		
The murder of Stephen Lawrence		
The murder of Brian McDermott		22 October 2003
The murder of Rachel Nickell		
The murder of Nisha Patel-Nasri		
The murder of Sarah Payne		
The murders of Eve Stratford and Lynne Weedon	DNA shows both were killed by the same person in separate incidents in London, 1975	23 April 2015
The death of Damilola Taylor		
The murder of Mark Tildesley		
The stabbing of Abigail Witchalls		
The murders of Holly Wells and Jessica Chapman		
The disappearance of Suzy Lamplugh		
The murders of Jacqueline Ansell-Lamb and Barbara Mayo	Unsolved murders in 1970 believed to be committed by the same person	17 January 1991
The kidnapping and murder of Julie Dart		
The murder of Julie Pacey	Featured again after a new DNA development. The 2015 appeal caused the arrest of the actor who played the murderer, after viewers mistakenly identified him as the killer	3 November 1994, 28 July 2015
The kidnapping of Stephanie Slater		
The murder of Claire Tiltman		18 February 1993
The disappearance of Claudia Lawrence		
The New Cross double murder		
The Joanna Yeates murder		
The disappearance and murder of Melanie Hall	Her case featured both after she disappeared in 1996 and after her remains were finally discovered in 2009	5 November 1996, 28 October 2009
The murder of Elaine Doyle in Greenock		
The murders of the Sharkey family	Whose house was deliberately set on fire in Helensburgh, Scotland.	
The murder of Rachel Hudson	Her case featured after her remains were discovered in 2004	
The 2007 Penhallow Hotel fire		20 February 2008
The disappearance of Madeleine McCann		

=== Suspects and criminal offenders ===
Title	Notes	Airdate
Sidney Cooke	Suspected murderer of Mark Tildesley	
John Cooper	Murderer	
Tony Alexander King a.k.a. Tony Bromwich	Originally known as the "Holloway Strangler", fled to southern Spain after he featured on Crimewatch before murdering two people	2 September 1997
Delroy Grant	'The night stalker', burglar and serial rapist of elderly women.	
Allan Grimson	Suspected serial killer who always killed on 12 December, and who is believed to have killed up to 20 people across naval bases around the world. Prime suspect in the disappearance of sailor Simon Parkes from Gibraltar on 12 December 1986.	5 October 2005
Christopher Halliwell	Discussed in relation to media speculation linking him to the unsolved murder of Sally Ann John	20 March 2017
Antoni Imiela	The M25 rapist	
Bible John	A serial killer who murdered three young women in Glasgow, Scotland in the late 1960s	
Fred Lawlor	Child abuser and murderer	
Fiona Mont	Formerly Britain's Most Wanted Woman	
The Motorway Monster	Unidentified murderer who killed two hitchhikers in separate incidents on motorways in 1970	17 January 1991
Kenneth Noye	Murderer	
'Overalls Man'	Mysterious prime suspect in the murder of Julie Pacey. After a 2015 re-appeal on the case, confused viewers mistakenly called in to report that the (innocent) actor who played the suspect, Steve Watson, was the killer	3 November 1994, 28 July 2015
Batman rapist	Subject to Britain's longest-running serial rape investigation. The offender is still unidentified	25 January 2000
Michael Sams	Rapist, kidnapper, extortionist and murderer	
Joel Smith	Murderer	
Michael Stone	Murderer	
Dena Thompson	Woman known as the 'Black Widow', murdered her second husband for financial gain and also stole money from many other partners. She was also tried for the attempted murder of her third husband.	6 January 2009
Peter Tobin	A serial killer who murdered Vicky Hamilton, Dinah McNicol and Angelika Kluk	
Steve Wright	A serial killer in the Ipswich serial murders	
2011 England riots	A special edition was aimed at identifying those who committed offences during that month's riots.	18 August 2011

== Transmissions ==
Series	Start date	End date	Episodes	Main presenter(s)	Co-presenter(s)	Police officers
1	7 June 1984	20 December 1984	6	Nick Ross	Sue Cook; Pattie Coldwell (April 1988)	David Hatcher; Helen Phelps (Note: Absent for Episodes 2 and 3 of Series 4 (1987) and Episode 6 of Series 6 (1989))
2	21 January 1985	12 December 1985	9	Nick Ross	Sue Cook; Pattie Coldwell (April 1988)	David Hatcher; Helen Phelps
3	30 January 1986	18 December 1986	10	Nick Ross	Sue Cook; Pattie Coldwell (April 1988)	David Hatcher; Helen Phelps
4	29 January 1987	8 December 1987	10	Nick Ross	Sue Cook; Pattie Coldwell (April 1988)	David Hatcher; Helen Phelps
5	12 January 1988	8 December 1988	10	Nick Ross	Sue Cook; Pattie Coldwell (April 1988)	David Hatcher; Helen Phelps
6	12 January 1989	7 December 1989	10 (Note: June's episode was postponed until July)	Nick Ross	Sue Cook; Pattie Coldwell (April 1988)	David Hatcher; Helen Phelps
7	18 January 1990	6 December 1990	10	Nick Ross	Sue Cook; Pattie Coldwell (April 1988)	David Hatcher (Note: Absent for Episode 4 and was replaced by Colin Fry); Jacqui Hames (Episodes 4–10); Colin Fry (Episode 4)
8	17 January 1991	5 December 1991	10	Nick Ross	Sue Cook; Pattie Coldwell (April 1988)	David Hatcher; Jacqui Hames
9	23 January 1992	10 December 1992	10	Nick Ross	Sue Cook; Pattie Coldwell (April 1988)	David Hatcher; Jacqui Hames
10	21 January 1993	9 December 1993	10	Nick Ross	Sue Cook; Pattie Coldwell (April 1988)	David Hatcher; Jacqui Hames
11	20 January 1994	2 December 1994	10	Nick Ross	Sue Cook; Pattie Coldwell (April 1988)	David Hatcher; Jacqui Hames
12	19 January 1995	13 December 1995	10	Nick Ross	Sue Cook (Episodes 1–6); Jill Dando (Episodes 7–10)	David Hatcher; Jacqui Hames
13	25 January 1996	10 December 1996	10	Nick Ross	Jill Dando	David Hatcher; Jacqui Hames
14	14 January 1997	16 December 1997	13	Nick Ross	Jill Dando	David Hatcher; Jacqui Hames
15	27 January 1998	15 December 1998	13	Nick Ross	Jill Dando	David Hatcher; Jacqui Hames
16	26 January 1999	14 December 1999	10	Nick Ross	Jill Dando (Episodes 1–4); No co-host (Episodes 5–10)	David Hatcher (Episodes 1–8); Jacqui Hames
17	25 January 2000	13 December 2000	11	Nick Ross	Fiona Bruce	Jacqui Hames
18	24 January 2001	20 December 2001	12	Nick Ross	Fiona Bruce	Jacqui Hames
19	13 February 2002	18 December 2002	13	Nick Ross	Fiona Bruce	Jacqui Hames
20	5 February 2003	17 December 2003	11	Nick Ross	Fiona Bruce	Jacqui Hames
21	27 January 2004	14 December 2004	11	Nick Ross	Fiona Bruce	Jacqui Hames; Rav Wilding (Episodes 6–11)
22	1 February 2005	20 December 2005	12	Nick Ross	Fiona Bruce	Jacqui Hames; Rav Wilding
23	31 January 2006	20 December 2006	11	Nick Ross	Fiona Bruce	Rav Wilding; Jacqui Hames (Episode 1); Jane Corrigan (Episodes 2–11)
24	8 February 2007	20 December 2007	10	Nick Ross (Episodes 1–6); Fiona Bruce (Episodes 7–10)	Fiona Bruce (Episodes 1–6)	Rav Wilding; Jane Corrigan
25	23 January 2008	15 December 2008	10	Kirsty Young	Matthew Amroliwala	Rav Wilding (Note: Absent for Episodes 2 and 3 of Series 28 (2011))
26	27 January 2009	21 December 2009	10	Kirsty Young	Matthew Amroliwala	Rav Wilding
27	27 January 2010	14 December 2010	10	Kirsty Young	Matthew Amroliwala	Rav Wilding
28	26 January 2011	15 December 2011	8	Kirsty Young	Matthew Amroliwala	Rav Wilding
29	26 January 2012	21 November 2012	8	Kirsty Young; Sophie Raworth (Episode 2); Sian Williams (Episode 5)	Matthew Amroliwala; Martin Bayfield (Episodes 2–8)	—N/a
30	14 February 2013	28 November 2013	8	Kirsty Young	Matthew Amroliwala; Martin Bayfield	—N/a
31	22 January 2014	4 December 2014	8	Kirsty Young	Matthew Amroliwala; Martin Bayfield	—N/a
32	21 January 2015	14 December 2015	8	Kirsty Young; Sian Williams (Episodes 3 & 6)	Martin Bayfield (Episodes 1–5, 7–8); Matthew Amroliwala (Episodes 1–2); Sonali Shah (Episodes 3–6); Jason Mohammad (Episodes 6–8)	—N/a
33	8 February 2016	10 March 2016	2	Sophie Raworth	Martin Bayfield; Jason Mohammad	—N/a
34	5 September 2016	26 September 2016	4	Jeremy Vine	Tina Daheley	—N/a
35	27 February 2017	20 March 2017	3	Jeremy Vine	Tina Daheley	—N/a

== Spin-offs and regional versions ==
Crime NI, a similar live monthly programme in partnership with Crimestoppers UK, was aired from 3 September 2021 to 11 April 2022 on BBC One Northern Ireland and presented by Wendy Austin and journalist Dearbhail McDonald. Previously, a localised version of the programme was aired in the English Midlands region on BBC Two from 1987 until 1991. Presented originally by Peter Purves and BBC Midlands Today's Kathy Rochford, who was later replaced by fellow newsreader Sue Beardsmore, Crimewatch Midlands was broadcast live from Pebble Mill Studios in Birmingham and ran for five series.

=== Crimewatch File ===
First aired on 10 August 1988, Crimewatch File is an hour-long programme devoted to the reconstruction and investigation of a single case including cases that the programme has previously helped to solve. Presented by Nick Ross and Sue Cook concurrently (with Jill Dando taking over from Cook in 1996), more than thirty editions aired until April 2000, when the final edition, fronted by Ross, was broadcast. Following this, in latter years of the main Crimewatch programme, episodes would regularly feature segments and reports in a very similar vein to Crimewatch File.

=== Crime Limited ===
Crime Limited was the second spin-off from Crimewatch which took cameras behind the scenes of the crimes. The first series aired on BBC One over ten episodes in 1992 and was presented by Nick Ross and Sue Cook. A second series ran in 1993 and a third series ran in 1994.

=== Crimewatch Extra ===
First aired in late 1998, Crimewatch Extra was a short-lived spin-off from the main programme, which would give updates and reports received on the cases featured in the previous month's programme. Broadcast on BBC Choice, the series was presented by Emma Howard. Around ten episodes were broadcast, with the final episode airing on 25 August 1999.

==== Crimewatch Extra transmissions ====
Title	Airdate	Presenter(s)
Crimewatch Extra 1	8 February 1999	Emma Howard
Crimewatch Extra 2	9 March 1999	Emma Howard
Crimewatch Extra 3	6 April 1999	Emma Howard
Crimewatch Extra 4	6 May 1999	Emma Howard
Crimewatch Extra 5	2 June 1999	Emma Howard
Crimewatch Extra 6	30 June 1999	Emma Howard
Crimewatch Extra 7	28 July 1999	Emma Howard
Crimewatch Extra 8	25 August 1999	Emma Howard

=== Crimewatch Solved ===
Beginning on 10 August 1999, a new yearly programme entitled Crimewatch: Solved was transmitted, showing cases previously featured on the programme that resulted in convictions. Aside from 2002, a new edition was broadcast every year until 2010, when the thirteenth and final edition aired on 1 September 2010.

=== Crimewatch Live ===
The BBC has aired a number of weekday Crimewatch programmes. Originally shown between 2000 and 2001, Crimewatch Daily was the first daily version of the programme, aired between 10:00 and 11:00am on weekday mornings, that appealed for help with unsolved cases not covered in the main programme. Originally shown between 2009 and 2020, Crimewatch Roadshow was the second daily version of the programme, that was broadcast on weekdays from 9:15 to 10:00am. From 8 March 2021, the show's name was changed to Crimewatch Live and is aired between 10.00 and 10:45am on weekday mornings.

=== Crimewatch Specials ===
Crimewatch also aired a number of one-off programmes.

First aired on 21 May 1997, Crimewatch: Hot Property was a one-off special presented by Jill Dando. The programme's aim was to help people find their stolen property that were recovered in police raids.

==== Episodes ====
Subtitle	Airdate	Presenter(s)
Hot Property	21 May 1997	Jill Dando
Still Unsolved (1)	2 December 1997	Nick Ross; Jill Dando
Still Unsolved (2)	22 September 1998	Nick Ross; Jill Dando
Cracking Crime: Don't Have Nightmares	18 September 2002	Nick Ross; Fiona Bruce; Peter Snow
Killer on Camera	12 March 2008	Kirsty Young
On the Streets 1	17 March 2008	Kirsty Young
The Killing of Sally Ann Bowman	8 April 2008	Kirsty Young
Innocent: the Colin Stagg Story	18 December 2008	—N/a
On the Streets 2	7 May 2009	Kirsty Young
On the Streets 3	11 August 2009	Kirsty Young
Catch Me If You Can: Murderers	17 May 2011	Philip Glenister
Taken: The Milly Dowler Story	30 June 2011	Kirsty Young
Riots Caught on Camera	18 August 2011	Rav Wilding
Catch Me If You Can: Armed Robbers	6 September 2011	Philip Glenister
Caught in the Crossfire	23 August 2012	Kirsty Young

=== Crimewatch Caught ===
In addition to marking the programme's 40th anniversary, a new spin-off documentary series was commissioned in 2024. Crimewatch Caught reveals the inner workings of how detectives investigated and solved a range of complex crimes. Each half-hour episode features exclusive interviews with leading officers, alongside the crucial CCTV, forensic evidence and witness testimony that allowed them to bring the perpetrators to justice. Selected episodes of the fifteen part series were first aired, during the run of the live daytime series, on the BBC Scotland channel and BBC One Wales at primetime and later in full over three weeks on BBC One in a daytime slot. A second series began airing in late September 2025.

== New Zealand version ==
A New Zealand version of Crimewatch was broadcast on TVNZ from 1987 until 1996 and was replaced by NZI Crimescene which was aired in 1997 and 1998. It was shown once a month on TV One.

In its first year, Crimewatch was shown on fourth Mondays at 8pm before moving to fourth Tuesdays at 8pm in 1988 and 8.30pm from 1989 (with a Crimewatch Update aired at around 11pm) until mid-1996. The programme moved to TV2 on 1 August 1996 and aired at 8.30pm on a fourth Thursday until it ended later that year.

Ian Johnstone presented the New Zealand version throughout its entire run, and was joined by Natalie Brunt (1987–88), Carol Hirschfeld (1989–93), Tiana Tofilau (1994) and Mairanga White (1995–96) as successive co-presenters. Calls to the show's special phoneline helped police solve approximately 1,400 cases.

== See also ==
- Police 5 (United Kingdom)
- Manhunt – Solving Britain's Crimes (United Kingdom)
- America's Most Wanted (United States)
- Fugitive Watch (United States)
- Unsolved Mysteries (United States)
- Crime Watch Daily (United States)
- The Hunt with John Walsh (United States)
- Aktenzeichen XY... ungelöst (Germany)
- Efterlyst (Sweden)
- Crimecall (Ireland)
- Ten 7 Aotearoa (New Zealand)
- India's Most Wanted (India)
- Police Report (Hong Kong)
- Linha Direta (Brazil)
- Crime Watch (Trinidad and Tobago)
- Crimewatch Singapore
