= Ron Hudson =

Ron or Ronald Hudson may refer to:

- Ron Hudson (American football coach, born 1947)
- Ron Hudson (American football coach, born 1964)
- Ron Hudson (ice hockey) (1911–1984), Canadian ice hockey player
- Ron Hudson, English murderer
- Ronnie Hudson (born 1957), American musician, composer and record producer
- R. W. H. T. Hudson (Ronald William Henry Turnbull Hudson, 1876–1904), British mathematician
