= Murder of Julie Pacey =

1994 mysterious UK unsolved murder

- Top: Victim Julie Pacey; Bottom: 1994 police artist's impression of 'Overalls Man', the man believed to have murdered Pacey. At the time he was described as about 35, chubby, with a notably red face and with rough hands. He would likely be in his 60s as of 2025
- Date: 26 September 1994
- Time: Between 3:20 pm and 4:15 pm
- Location: 30 Longcliffe Road, Grantham, England; 52.92818°N 0.63757°W
- Cause: Strangulation
- Motive: Not fully known, although victim was sexually assaulted

The murder of Julie Pacey (1955/1956 – 26 September 1994) is an unsolved murder of a mother in her own home in Grantham, England on Monday 26 September 1994. 38-year-old Pacey was found strangled to death with a cord in her first-floor bathroom by her 14-year-old daughter on her return home from school. The prime suspect, 'Overalls Man', was seen by numerous witnesses in the vicinity of Pacey's home in the days around the murder, and had appeared at Pacey's home when she was alone three days previously. Although she had been sexually assaulted, investigators do not know why she was apparently targeted in what appeared to be a planned attack.

The case has twice featured on Crimewatch. The actor who played the role of the killer in the Crimewatch reconstruction was investigated as a suspect in September 2015 after the 1994 appeal was re-shown, as some viewers who had watched the appeal mistakenly called in to report him as the killer.

Publicity on the case returned in 2015 after a full DNA profile of the killer was created. As the killer's DNA did not have any matches on the UK National DNA Database, police continue to appeal to the public to come forward with information.

== Pacey's background ==
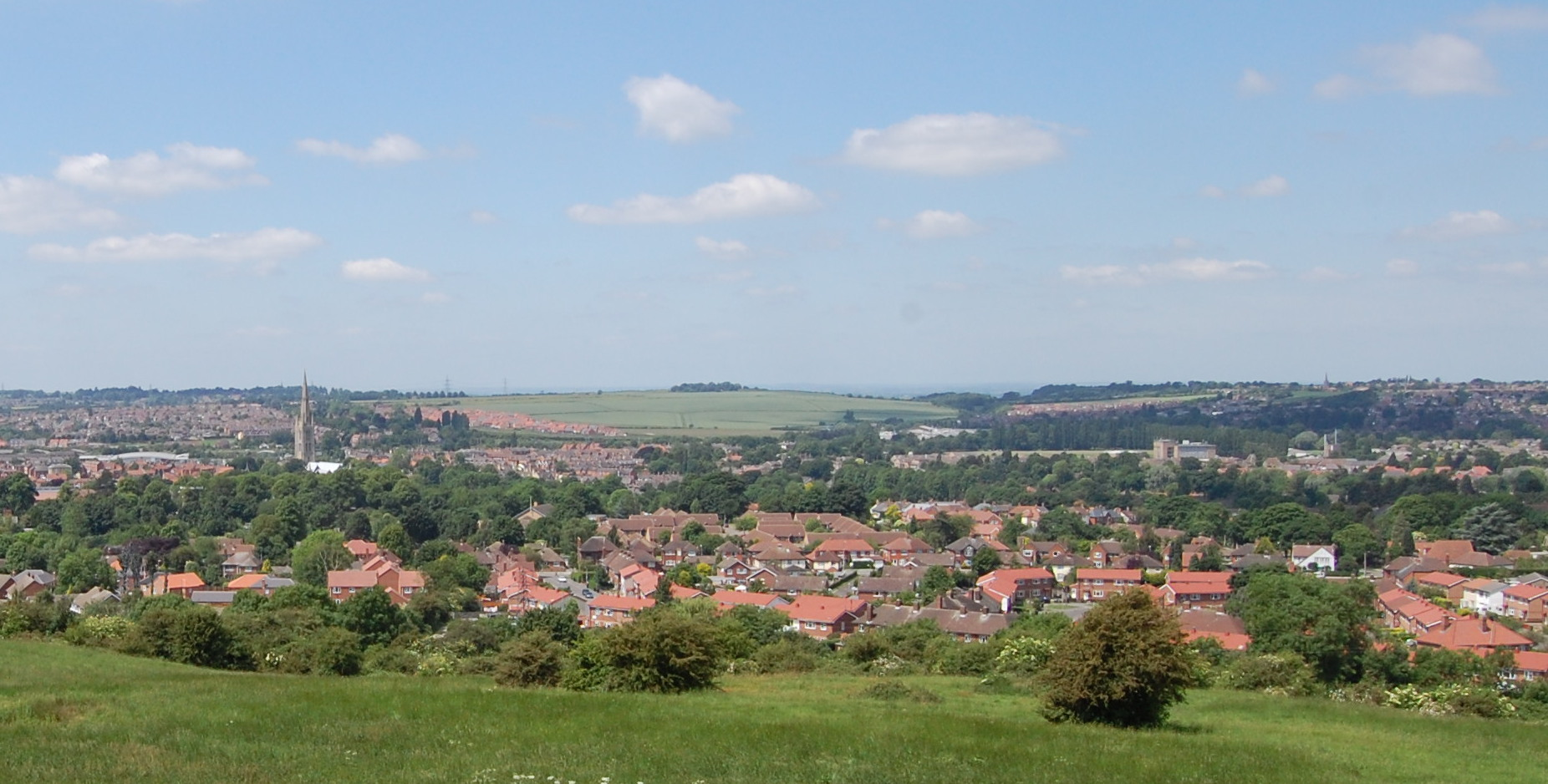
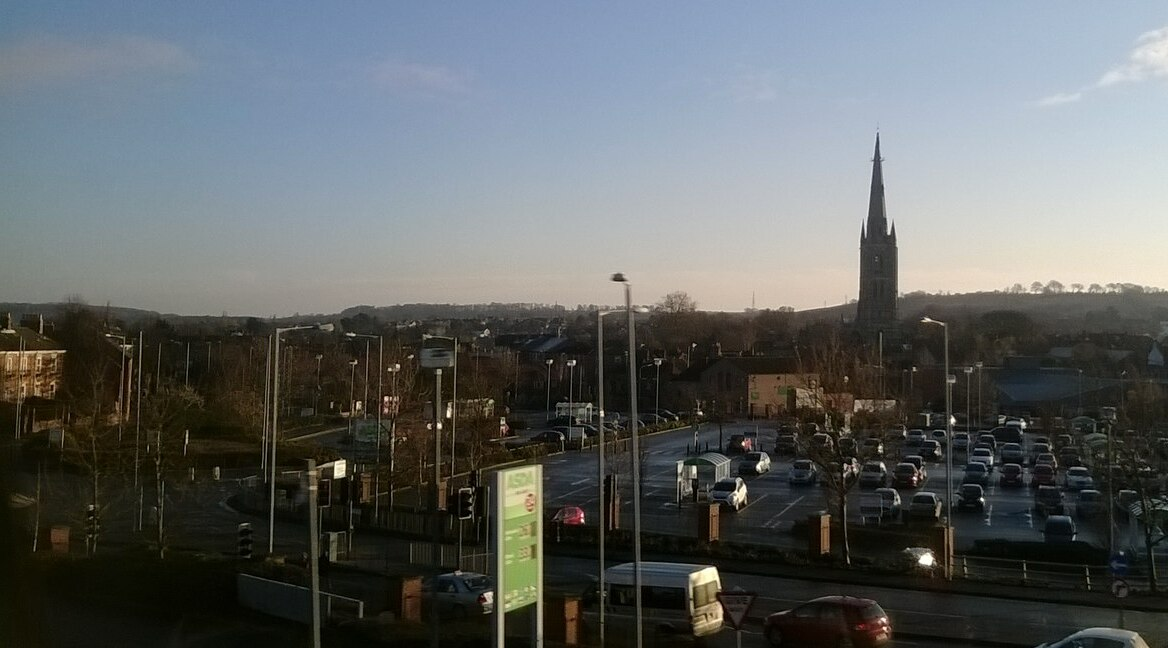
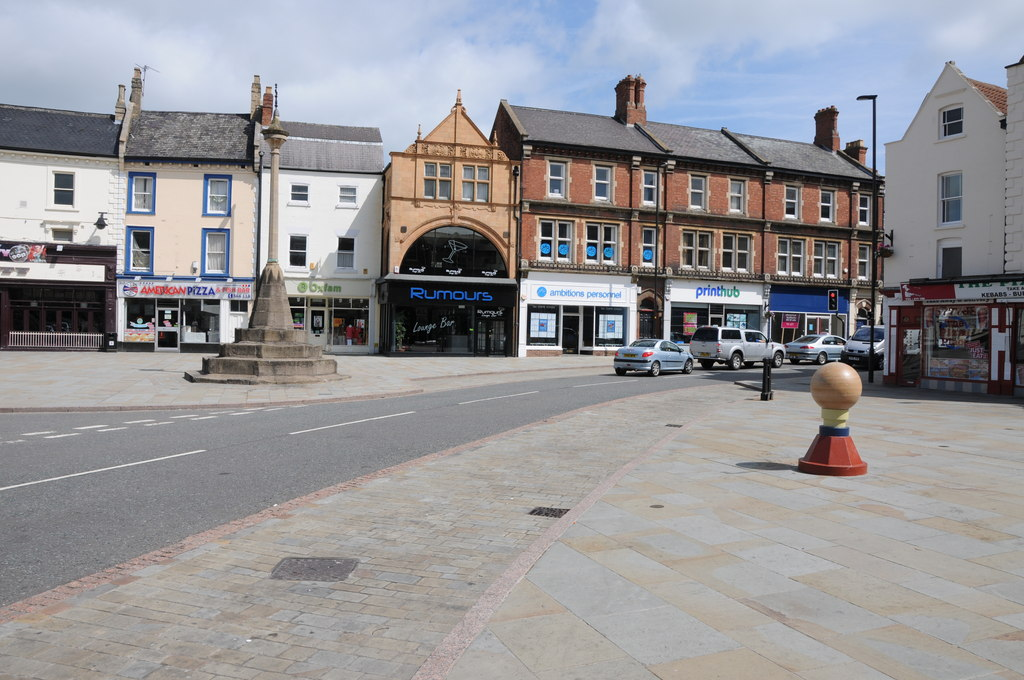
The murder occurred in Grantham, Lincolnshire

"She loved to be with the kids, and we were just a normal family, nothing special, just run-of-the-mill, ordinary people. That's all we were."

— Pacey's husband Andrew, describing their background and how unusual it was that they were victims of this crime, on Crimewatch in 2015

Pacey was a 38-year-old mother of two who lived with her family in a luxury bungalow in Grantham, Lincolnshire. Her husband was Andrew Pacey, whom she had originally met at the age of eight, and they were childhood sweethearts. They had been married for eighteen years at the time of the murder and had two children, 14-year-old Helen and 11-year-old Matthew. Julie looked after children part-time at local preschool St Peter's Day Nursery in St Catherine's Road, which was opposite the town's police headquarters. Andrew later described her as someone who "got on with everyone" and was "kind and caring and considerate" and "lived for the family". Andrew worked for a long-established plumbing business in the town. The area they lived in was described as a peaceful neighbourhood.

Pacey was described as a "vivacious blonde" and a "vivacious 'perfect mum'" in the press, with neighbours saying she was "extremely attractive and popular".

== Lead-up to murder ==
The murder occurred in the Manthorpe area of Grantham

There were a number of suspicious occurrences in the lead-up to Pacey's murder which police believe may have been related to the killing. At around 3:30 pm on Friday 23 September 1994, three days before Pacey was killed, a local girl who came to the Pacey home after school to wait for her own mother's return from work saw a suspicious figure. As she walked towards the house, she saw a "strange man" wearing blue overalls walking into the Pacey driveway. When the girl walked into the driveway to enter the house, the unknown man walked back out and passed directly by her, with the girl saying he was also wearing brown workman's boots, was fairly chubby and looked around 35. The girl said he had a big round face that was "all pink", with him having a ruddy complexion. He also had rough hands. As soon as the girl passed him and entered through the front door, Pacey asked her if she'd seen the strange man that had just entered, with Pacey explaining that she'd heard a knock at the door and assumed it was the girl as expected but that the stranger male had entered and asked for directions. Pacey revealed that the man had asked for directions to Eskdale Road. The girl involved would later help create an artist's impression of the ruddy-faced individual in overalls.

Though the Pacey family car was an Audi 80, several people later insisted to police that they'd seen Pacey in a 5-series BMW in the period before the murder. On the very day of the murder, an acquaintance of Pacey's was driving down her road when she again saw this BMW car. She had been driving behind it but it turned into the Paceys' driveway, on which she also saw the family Audi car. This was about 2:50 pm on the Monday Pacey was murdered, after Pacey had herself returned home in the Audi at around 2:45 pm.

== Murder ==
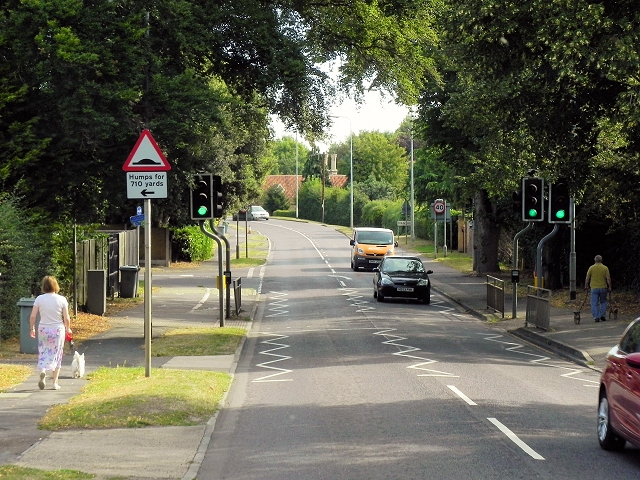
Manthorpe Road in Grantham, looking north. The turning to Longcliffe Road, where Pacey's home was 300m (330 yards) up the road, can be seen on the left. Around the time of the murder the man in blue overalls was seen around this area, and an unidentified BMW sped out of Longcliffe Road around the time of the killing and sped towards the position of the camera towards Grantham town centre.

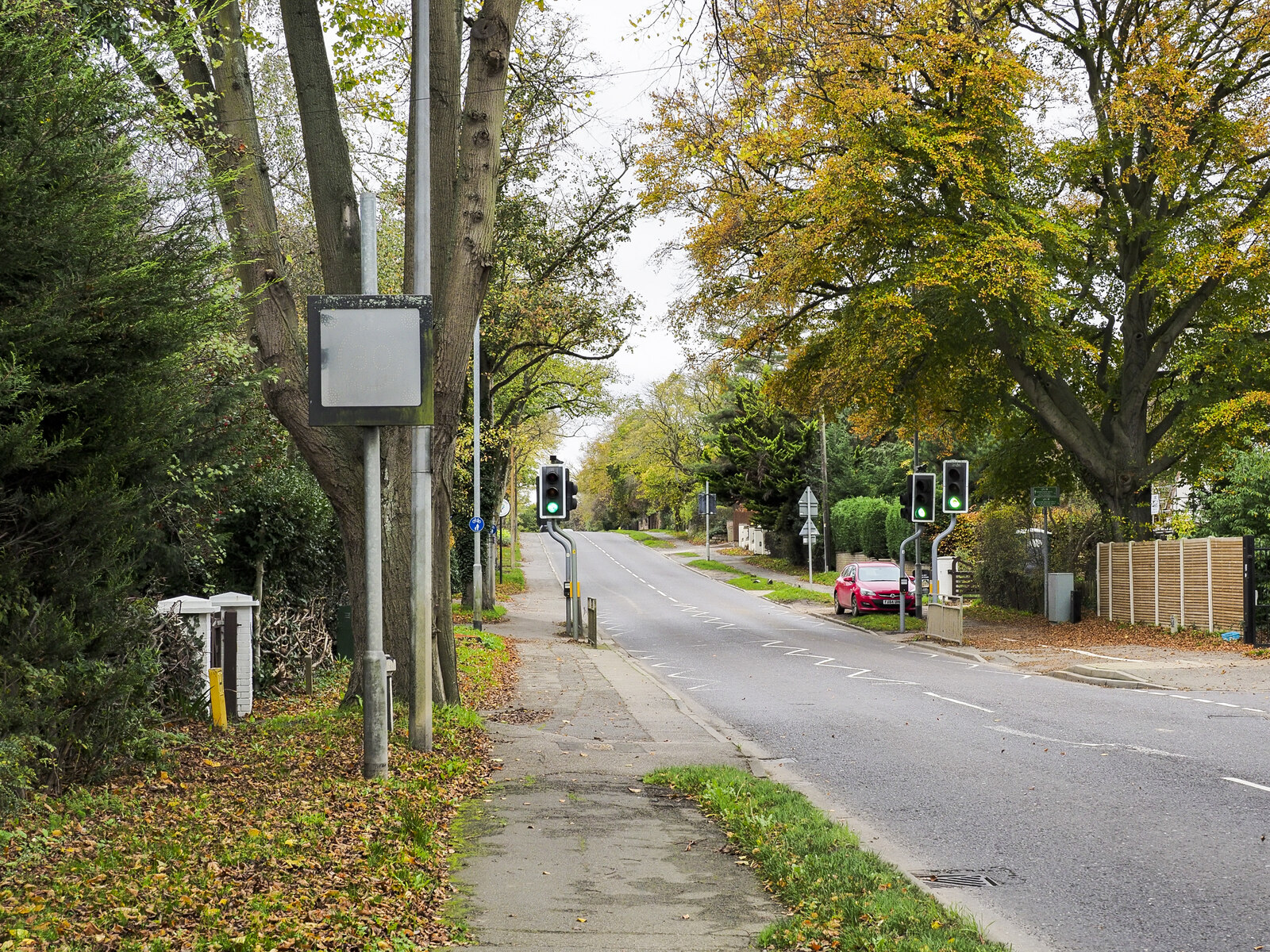
At the approximate time of the murder, there were sightings of the BMW car coming out of the turning to Longcliffe Road on the right and speeding down this road away from the scene into Grantham town centre, in the direction the camera is facing

The murder occurred on Monday 26 September, 1994. That day, Pacey had left for work at around 10 am. Her husband was out that day working on a plumbing contract on Pechiney Packaging in Springfield Road with his brother. Having returned home in the family Audi car at 2:45 pm that day, Julie left again around half an hour later to go to the shops, being seen driving the Audi in Highcliffe Road near to her home. A man in blue overalls – apparently the same that had randomly turned up at Pacey's home asking for directions three days earlier – was seen walking up the road at the same time. He walked into the road as Pacey was passing in her car, causing her to nearly hit him. After Pacey's car had passed, the man was witnessed suddenly turning round and running back towards where Pacey's car had gone.

At around 4:15 pm Julie's daughter Helen arrived home from school to discover her mother dead in the first-floor bathroom. Pacey had been sexually assaulted and strangled. A ligature mark was found around her neck, and she had been strangled with a cord. She was fully clothed, but some of her clothes had been disarranged.

Only one item was found to be missing from the home after the murder: her French Luc Desroches watch, which she bought shortly before she died while on holiday in France for the equivalent of £10. This item has never been found and was apparently taken from her home by her killer.

== Initial investigation ==
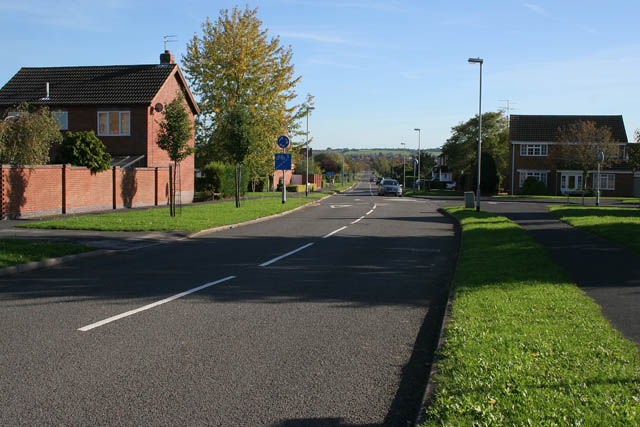
Longcliffe Road, on which Pacey's home was located and the murder occurred at

It was soon discovered by police that the suspicious man in blue overalls/dungarees had been additionally seen by a number of witnesses on the estate and in Grantham generally between Thursday 22 September, four days before the murder, and Tuesday 27 September, the day after. The witnesses generally agreed he had a particularly red face. It emerged that this man had been asking a number of people for directions to different places, including an industrial site far away on the other side of town, and never asked the witnesses to repeat any directions. The morning after the murder, at 9 am, he was seen again kicking grass nearby as if he was looking for something, and he later entered a shop in Grantham town centre, acting "totally suspiciously" according to the shopkeeper. He was still wearing the blue overalls. This man became known as 'Overalls Man'.

It was quickly established that there was a sexual motive for the crime, with Pacey having been sexually assaulted, although current investigators note that they have still found no specific motive for why she was apparently targeted to be attacked. There were no signs of a break in, no indications of a struggle, and she was found face down in the bathroom which is where it is believed she was killed. It was believed she may have been strangled from behind. Her nails, which had been "beautifully manicured", were found to be unbroken, further indicating the lack of struggle. It was believed that the daughter had found Pacey's body only minutes after she had been attacked. Police theorised that the man could have entered the house because Pacey had left her keys in the lock as she entered.

Pacey's case featured on Crimewatch in November 1994. It was said that it was "quite bizarre" that the family were adamant that Pacey never had access to a BMW despite apparently being seen in it by numerous witnesses. The sightings had weight as some were made by people who knew Pacey well and knew she drove an Audi, and some of these witnesses stated that they had seen this BMW parked next to the Audi on the drive. Furthermore, a BMW with the same description was seen twice speeding away from the scene of the murder at around 3:20 pm, the time at which Pacey was seen driving her Audi down Highcliffe Road as she encountered the man in the blue overalls.

On Monday 3 October 1994, exactly a week after the murder, police stopped more than 500 people walking or driving along Longcliffe Road to ask if they had any information on the murder. Questionnaires were handed out to mothers and children. A full-colour poster with the artist's impression of the 'Overalls Man' was distributed to every house on Pacey's estate.

Detectives believed that the watch that had been stolen may have been given to a wife or girlfriend by the killer, and they then may have started wearing it without realising its significance.

Pacey's parents later said that they believed that the killer may not have known Julie but "known of her", saying: "It is too much of a coincidence that it happened the one day when she wasn't looking after the little girl she minded and before the children came home from school". One of the lead detectives, Superintendent Roger Billingsley, declared in 1997 that the murder appeared to be a pre-meditated crime.

== Continuing publicity ==
The case eventually went cold, but continued to receive publicity. In 2001, it was reported that links between Pacey's case and the murder of 21-year-old Sharon Harper four months earlier in Grantham had been investigated. The links were made as part of Operation Enigma, a wider national police investigation into the unsolved murders of dozens of women in the UK in the 1990s. Several 'clusters' of similar murders were identified which suggested that each could be the work of one man, and the Harper and Pacey cases were one of these 'clusters'. A barmaid and a mother, Harper had been murdered after she left her Grantham pub workplace after midnight one night, and her body was found soon after in undergrowth near to her home having been strangled to death and beaten.

Publicity returned to the case in 2015 after significant developments. A second appeal was made on Crimewatch, 21 years after the original reconstruction, where it was revealed that scientists had managed to isolate a full DNA profile of the killer. It was further noted that all investigations had failed to establish an actual motive for the crime, with Pacey simply being a family woman who lived for her children and there being no reason why someone should attack her. The crime was described on BBC crimewatch as a "truly dreadful case". The DNA development, which was made using the modern DNA-17 profiling technique, was described as a "landmark forensic breakthrough". The DNA did not match anyone in the UK National DNA Database. Lead detective Helen Evans appealed to the public to help identify the murderer by giving names to compare to the DNA profile. Appeals were also made to the 'Overalls Man' that he could come forward and potentially be eliminated with the DNA. However, he has not done so.

Shortly after the Crimewatch appeal, in early September 2015, the original actor himself in the 1994 reconstruction was investigated after calls to the programme. Some viewers who had watched the re-appeal, which included sections from the original 1994 reconstruction, became, as described by The Independent, 'confused', and called to name the actor playing the killer as being responsible. This caused police to visit and take the DNA of the man, the 53-year-old Steve Watson, who they did not realise was the original appeal actor. Watson stated that locals had recognised him in the street after the reconstruction and so named him as the killer, and police investigated him as a result, saying: "[My face] was on the screen for too long and even then, people in the street said, 'Oh, is that that murderer? To hear those words you think, 'Please, it's just a reconstruction, surely you understand', but unfortunately they don't". He added that people had come up to him in the street and said "you're that murderer" or "you're that one that got that poor girl". Watson had previously received abuse from confused locals who thought he was the killer after he played the suspect in the 1994 appeal. He had played the role due to his likeness to the suspect, but this had caused problems, including a police officer nearly arresting him after he turned up at the police station dressed as the suspect to film the reconstruction with the TV crew. After the 2015 events, Watson described the situation as "ridiculous" to the press. No further action was taken against Watson after the DNA sample was taken and in 2017 he was reported to have been found "entirely innocent".

== See also ==
Other UK cold cases where the offender's DNA is known:

- Murder of Deborah Linsley
- Murders of Eve Stratford and Lynne Weedon
- Murder of Lisa Hession
- Murders of Jacqueline Ansell-Lamb and Barbara Mayo
- Murder of Lindsay Rimer
- Murder of Janet Brown
- Murder of Sheila Anderson
- Murder of Linda Cook
- Murder of Melanie Hall
- Batman rapist – subject to Britain's longest-running serial rape investigation
