= Fugitive Watch =

Fugitive Watch is a reality-based cable television show, newspaper and website, founded in 1992 by two San Francisco Bay Area police officers, Steve Ferdin and Scott Castruita.

== Content ==
It features stories on crimes and fugitives, and Ferdin and Castruita say that the service has led to over 1,200 arrests, thanks to viewers who provide tip-offs about where wanted criminals may be hiding.

== Recognition ==
Fugitive Watch has been endorsed and commended by California Governor Pete Wilson, the FBI and chiefs of police and sheriffs.

One law enforcement official stated, "Because of Fugitive Watch, there are millions of more eyes on the lookout for fugitives."

The service has been featured in newspapers and in nationally televised programs like World News Tonight with Peter Jennings, Inside Edition and Unsolved Mysteries. They have also televised Spanish-language stories and have been featured in local Spanish-language newscasts and international television programs like “Primer Impacto”.

== See also ==
- Crimewatch, similar programme in the United Kingdom
