= Jacqui Hames =

English journalist

- Occupations: Journalist, former police officer
- Years active: 1977–present

Jacqui Hames is an English journalist, television presenter and former police officer.

== Career ==
Jacqui Hames was a presenter of the BBC programme Crimewatch from 1990 until 2007. In 2008, she published Savvy! with Fiona Bruce. In 2012, she gave evidence to the Leveson inquiry after she was a victim of the phone hacking scandal. Hames has since presented programmes on Sky News and the BBC and has appeared on Good Morning Britain, This Morning and LBC.

== Personal life ==
Hames was married to Detective Chief Superintendent Dave Cook.

She is played by Eve Myles in the 2025 ITV drama about the News International phone hacking scandal, The Hack; Cook is played by Robert Carlyle.
