= Disappearance of Charlene Downes =

2003 disappearance in England

Charlene Downes
- Born: 25 March 1989; Coventry, West Midlands, England
- Disappeared: 1 November 2003 (aged 14); Blackpool, Lancashire, England
- Status: Missing for 23 years and 14 days Presumed deceased
- Died: c. 1 November 2003
- Reward: £100,000

On 1 November 2003, Charlene Elizabeth Caroline Downes, a 14‑year‑old girl from Blackpool in north‑west England, disappeared from the town centre. She was last seen in an area containing several takeaway and fast‑food outlets, and police believe she was murdered within hours of the final sighting. She has not been found.

Two men were tried in May 2007 – one for her murder and the other for assisting in the disposal of her body – but the jury failed to reach a verdict. A re‑trial was planned, but both men were released in April 2008 after concerns were raised about the reliability of key evidence.

Lancashire Constabulary believe that, for a prolonged period before her disappearance, Downes had been subjected to child sexual abuse by one or more men. Detectives interviewed around 3,000 people and uncovered evidence that she and other local girls had been victims of localised grooming, being offered to swap sex for food, cigarettes, and affection, which is a form of child sexual exploitation. It is thought that as many as 60 girls may have been targeted.

On 1 August 2017, a 51‑year‑old man was arrested on suspicion of murdering Downes and was released two days later; he is no longer under investigation. A £100,000 reward remains available for information leading to a conviction or the recovery of her body.

== Background ==
Charlene Elizabeth Caroline Downes was born on 25 March 1989 in Coventry, West Midlands. The family moved to Blackpool, Lancashire, in 1999.

She lived in Buchanan Street, Blackpool, with her parents – Karen and Robert Downes, a former soldier – as well as her brother and two sisters. Charlene attended St George's School, Blackpool. Although described in court as "well and happy", she had experienced a "chaotic" lifestyle after being expelled from school, frequenting the area around Blackpool's Central Promenade.

According to an internal police report, Downes was one of 60 girls in Blackpool, some as young as 11, who had been groomed by ethnic Pakistani men to carry out sex acts. The girls would be given food and cigarettes by the male employees of fast-food outlets in exchange for sex.

=== Social services involvement ===
The Downes family had been known to the child protective agencies in Coventry, Walsall, and Blackpool, with services first investigating the family in 1989, the same year that Downes was born. The investigation found that Downes had been surrounded by sex offenders, many who had been invited into the home by her father, Robert. It was thought that at least 16 men with convictions of rape, assault and violence had visited the family home or stayed at the residence. Downes' parents claimed they were not aware of the convictions.

Despite these claims, it was uncovered that social services in West Midlands had spoken to the family, following concerns around a convicted rapist who was a frequent visitor. The man had previously assaulted two young girls and been jailed three times for buggery. The man was allowed unsupervised access to the children, and social services "strongly advised" Robert to ban him from visiting again. However, a witness told authorities that they had seen the man fondling a child in the house while their parents were present.

In 1998, Downes and another girl alleged that they were both being sexually abused by a man who had been "trusted by Mr. and Mrs. Downes to take them to school". Downes was 9 at the time, and the man was charged with rape, but the case collapsed after the other girl involved failed to give evidence. Police reported that Downes' parents had some knowledge of the abuse but had failed to act. Following this incident, social services threatened to charge her parents with willful neglect and take the children into care. The family moved to Blackpool shortly after.

One 40-year-old friend of Robert's admitted he had paid Downes to perform a sex act on him. Another man in his 60s had been found in bed with Downes, who was 12 at the time of the incident. His trousers had been unzipped and his belt unfastened. Downes' parents allowed a 34-year-old man to stay at the family home while on bail for sexual offenses. Three days after Downes' disappearance, he was jailed for sexually assaulting three 10-year-old girls. He later admitted to having indecently touched Downes.

Downes' parents claimed that she had told them about receiving gifts from Asian takeaway staff, but were not aware of any white men who could have been abusing her.

== Last sighting ==
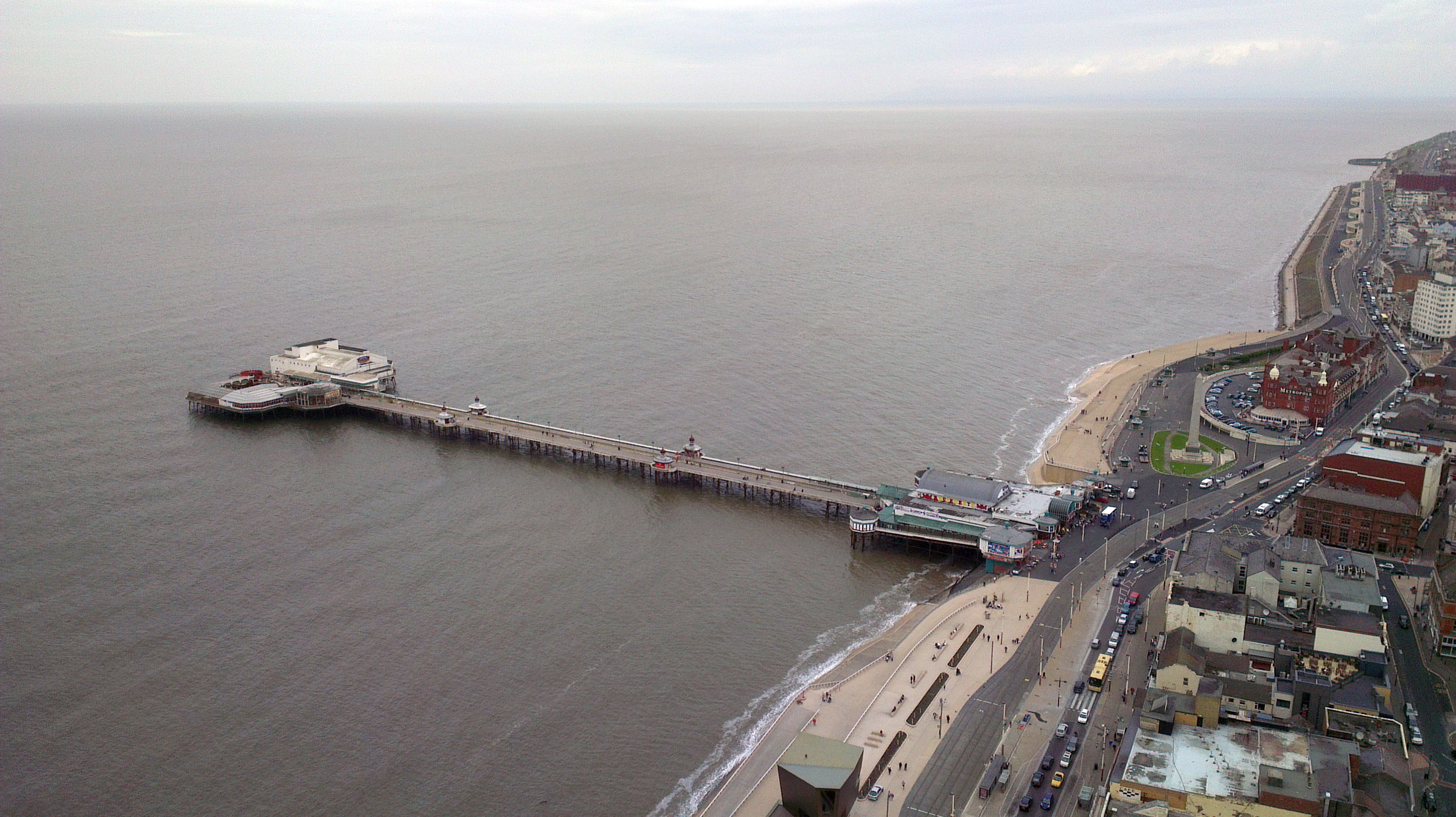
(above and below) Blackpool's North Pier, where Downes was seen on the evening she disappeared

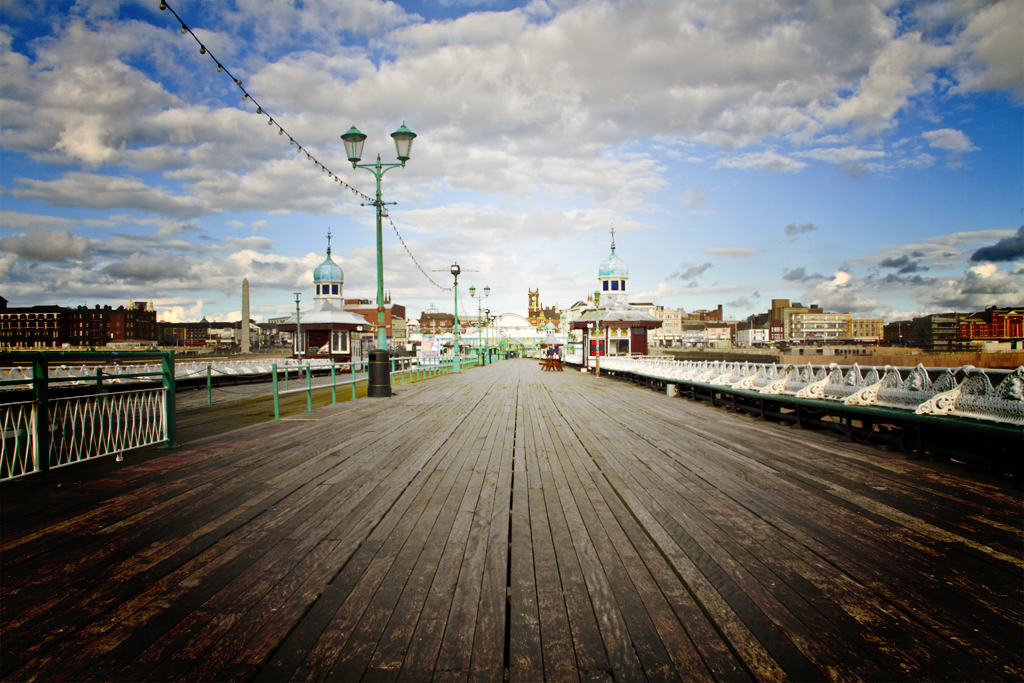

Charlene's mother, Karen, last spoke to her early in the evening of 1 November 2003, in Blackpool town centre. Downes was wearing black jeans with a gold-eagle design on the front, a black jumper with a white-diamond pattern, and black boots. Police say she may also have been wearing a white cardigan or top with a hood.

Karen was in Church Street handing out flyers for an Indian restaurant when she saw Charlene and one of her other daughters, Rebecca, at around 6:45 pm. The three of them talked briefly. Rebecca said she was going home; Charlene said she was going to meet some female friends. She called them from a local telephone box, then waited with her mother until they arrived. Karen watched the girls walk off together toward the Winter Gardens. That was the last time she saw her daughter.

The friends spent a short time together. Downes then met another friend at around 9:30 pm and visited the Carousel Bar on the North Pier. There is CCTV footage of a girl at 9 pm on the junction of Dickson Road and Talbot Road (a main thoroughfare that leads from North Pier to the town centre) that is believed to be Downes; she is with an unidentified woman in her 30s with dyed-blonde hair wearing a three-quarter-length coat. According to Downes's friend, she and Charlene left the Carousel Bar and returned to the town centre at around 10 pm. Her friend last saw her at around 11 pm near Talbot Road/Abingdon Street.

== Murder trial ==
In March 2006 two men were arrested, on suspicion of Downes's murder. Lancashire Constabulary began several forensic searches, including at the Funny Boyz takeaway, on Dickson Road.

In May 2007 the case went to trial at Preston Crown Court. The prosecution alleged that Charlene had been murdered by Iyad Albattikhi, a 29-year-old man from Jordan and the owner of Funny Boyz fast-food outlet in Blackpool. Mohammed Reveshi, Albattikhi's business partner and landlord, was accused of disposing of her body.

A witness, who worked at a different restaurant, claimed she overheard Albattikhi speaking to her employer. The group had been discussing having sex with girls, when Albattikhi claimed he had previously had sex with Downes. The group then joked that she had "gone into the kebabs". According to the prosecution, Downes had been groomed and raped by older men who worked in the fast-food shops. They suggested that Downes may have been raped by one, or both, of the men before her death.

Another witness claimed that Albattikhi's brother confided in them that they knew what had happened to Downes. He claimed that Downes had been murdered, and chopped up, and that there had been a lot of blood. The witness had apparently then been threatened not to tell anyone, and later offered "an interest-free £20,000 loan" from Reveshi to keep quiet. However, the witness spoke to the police in December 2004.

The police presented audio recordings from concealed microphones that they had placed in both the men's flats, and inside Reveshi's car. The tapes were described as "hard to decipher", and had taken the police 2,400 hours to transcribe the audio over a two-year period. The prosecution's sound expert had a difference of opinion with the police over the transcription of the records.

The jury deliberated for 49 hours over 11 days, before reporting they had failed to reach a verdict. A re-trial was scheduled for April 2008, but serious errors in the Lancashire Constabulary's covert surveillance evidence were raised with the Crown Prosecution Service and the IPCC. As a result the Prosecution Service could offer no case, and the men were released.

== IPCC investigation ==
The IPCC opened an 18 month long investigation into the covert evidence collected by the Lancashire Constabulary, aiming to understand why the trial had collapsed.

The final report was published in 2009 with the IPCC identifying several failures that lead to the trial collapsing. This included the police’s failure to keep proper records, failing to ensure the integrity of their evidence, use of inexperienced and untrained officers, and failing to fully transcribe material that they had collected. The covert surveillance in particular had been handled poorly and unprofessionally.

The IPCC recommended that one officer face a disciplinary hearing, another receive a written warning, and five officers receive words of advice.

In 2011 Det Sgt Jan Beasant was found guilty of two counts of misconduct by Lancashire Constabulary following the IPCC recommendation for a disciplinary hearing. Beasant had been the officer who transcribed the covert surveillance. In 2012 a Police Arbitration Tribunal overturned the decision. In 2014, Beasant's lawyer said she was suing the police for up to £500,000, as her transcripts were, in fact, entirely accurate.

== Subsequent publicity ==
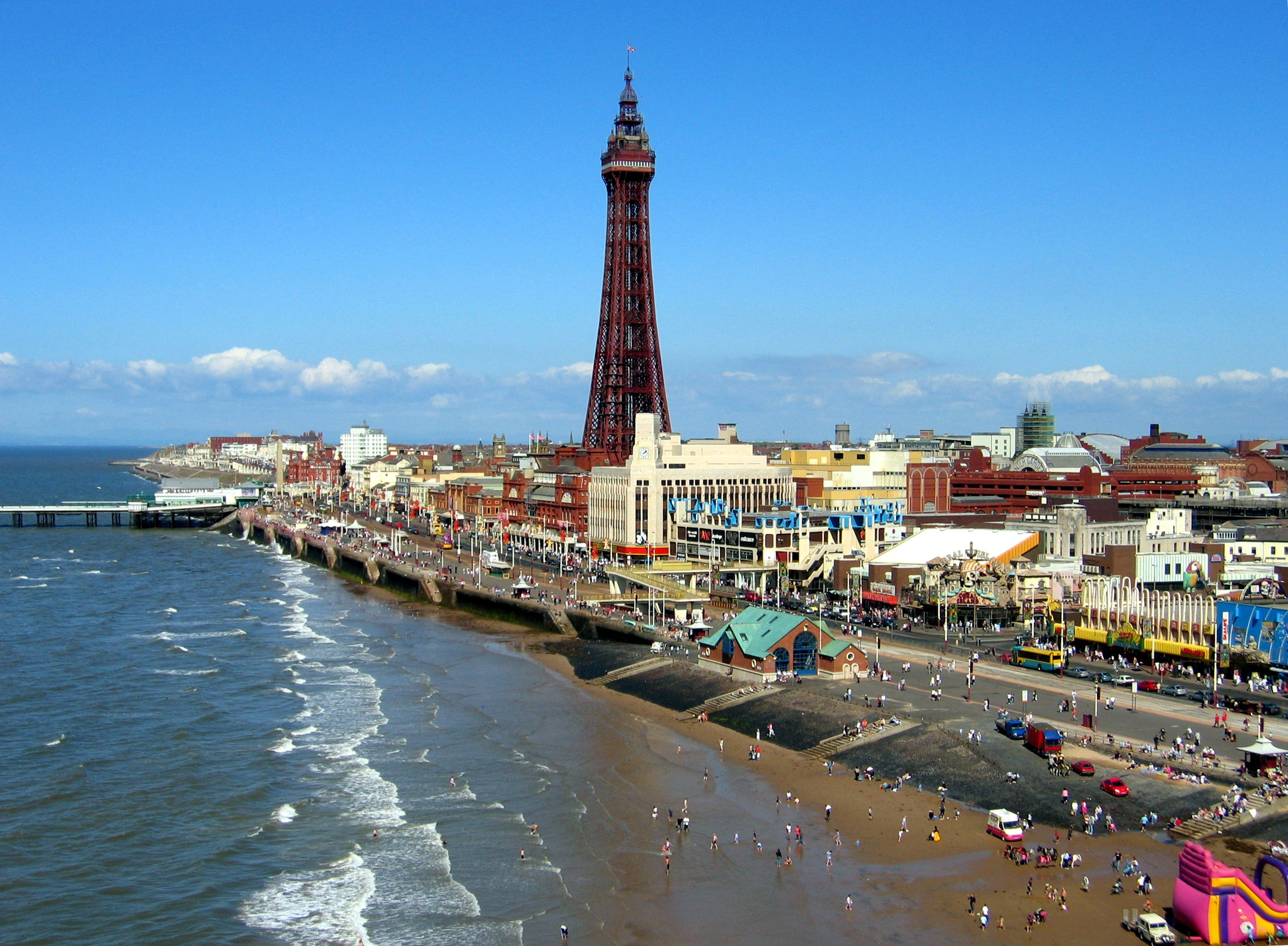
Blackpool Tower on the Central Promenade

The police investigation brought to public attention what Julie Bindel described in The Guardian as "endemic child sexual abuse" in Blackpool. According to a police report, the employees of 11 takeaway shops in the town centre had been grooming dozens of white girls aged 13–15, giving them cigarettes, food and alcohol for sex. Mick Gradwell, a former detective superintendent with Lancashire Constabulary, told The Daily Telegraph that the police inquiry into child grooming in Blackpool, Blackburn and Burnley had been "hampered by political correctness". Allegedly this was because the girls were white and the perpetrators non-white.

In April 2008, the week after the attempt at re-trial failed, Karen Downes stabbed her husband during an argument. The wounds were minor and he declined to press charges, saying that Karen was maddened with worry and frustration.

In March 2009, Charlene's sister, Emma, pleaded not guilty to racially aggravated assault against the brother of the man who had been charged with murdering Charlene. She maintained that her assault on the man's brother had never been racially motivated; on the first day of her trial the prosecution accepted her plea to common assault, a less serious offence. She was sentenced to community service.

The Funny Boyz takeaway was renamed to Mr Beanz, and lost its license to serve hot food between from 11pm-5am in 2010. A police solicitor warned Blackpool Council’s licensing panel that young girls were still frequenting the takeaway, and that there were concerns around sexual activity occurring. Mr Albattikhi and Mr Raveshi appealed the decision, claiming that they were victims of a smear campaign. Their appeal was rejected.

In 2011, Albattikhi was convicted of assault after headbutting an 18-year-old woman.

The case attracted attention from British far-right groups, the English Defence League and British National Party, who hosted marches demanding "Justice for Charlene". The Downes family joined these marches, with Charlene's mother, Karen, saying, "“No one else has been doing anything to help us.” In 2011 Karen used social media to blame Asian takeaway staff for sending Downes “off the rails”. She also posted that all Muslims should be burnt “with petrol and explosives”.^{[}

Britain First launched “Operation Downes”, a campaign that they claimed would “combat the scourge of Islamist grooming gangs around the country.” As part of the campaign members of Britain First handed out flyers, that contained photos of men who had been convicted of grooming offences. The members asked for the public to contact them if they witnessed any activity that could be connected to potential grooming gangs. They also recorded and uploaded videos of members handing out the flyers to local businesses and mosques in Rotherham.

In 2012, Charlene's younger brother admitted in court to punching the man who had faced the charge of helping to dispose of her body. He was given a fine and a suspended sentence.

In July 2013, journalist Sean Thomas noted in The Daily Telegraph that the original Charlene Downes article on Wikipedia had been deleted in June 2007, and argued that this might be an attempt to "redraft" history and to not give coverage to people whom editors see as far-right.

Downes's disappearance became the subject of a BBC One Panorama programme, "The Girl Who Vanished", on 10 November 2014. In December 2014, BBC Crimewatch staged a reconstruction of the last sighting of Downes, and the police offered a £100,000 reward for information leading to the conviction of the killer(s) or recovery of the body.

== Further investigation ==
In November 2013 police announced they were assigning a specialist team to reinvestigate her case, alongside the case of Paige Chivers, another teenager who had also disappeared in Blackpool in 2007.

On 1 August 2017, police arrested a 51-year-old man from Preston, who lived in Blackpool at the time of Downes's disappearance, on suspicion of murdering her. He was released two days later and is no longer under investigation.

== See also ==
- List of people who disappeared mysteriously (2000–present)
- Murder of Lindsay Rimer, unsolved 1994 case of a 13-year-old girl who disappeared from the street in Yorkshire
- Disappearance of Suzy Lamplugh, one of Britain's most famous disappearance cases
