= Christina Lambert =

British high court judge

The Honourable Mrs Justice Lambert DBE
- Royal coat of arms of the United Kingdom

High Court Judge King's Bench Division
- Incumbent
- Assumed office 11 January 2018
- Monarchs: Elizabeth II; Charles III

Personal details
- Born: 15 August 1963 (age 63) Newcastle upon Tyne, England

Dame Christina Caroline Lambert DBE, styled Mrs Justice Lambert (born 15 August 1963) is a British High Court judge.

== Early life and education ==
Lambert was born on 15 August 1963 in Newcastle upon Tyne. She attended Central Newcastle High School for Girls. She studied history at Emmanuel College, Cambridge, and law at City University, London.

After graduating, Lambert worked at the Peggy Guggenheim Collection in Venice.

== Career ==
Before completing her Bar training course, in 1988 Lambert was awarded a grant by the Inner Temple of £3.500 and a Yarbrough-Anderson scholarship of £300 in August 1988. (£8,410 in 2019).

After completing her Pupillage, Lambert was called to the Bar by Inner Temple in 1988 and began her tenancy at 6 Pump Court Chambers. She later moved to '1 Crown Office Row' where she remained until taking up office. She was appointed King's Counsel in 2009.

In 2012 Lambert was appointed as Lead Counsel to the Dame Janet Smith Review into the culture and practices of the BBC relating to the sexual abuse of Jimmy Savile. Between 2014 and 2016, Lambert acted as lead counsel for the coroner in the Hillsborough disaster inquest. She remarked that the inquest as the most memorable moment in her career.

“During my questioning of the match commander, David Duckenfield, he admitted that he lied about fans forcing the exit gate to gain entry to the stadium: the court — packed with the relatives of those who died — fell completely silent.”

=== High Court appointment ===
Lambert was appointed as a High Court judge on 11 January 2018 and assigned to the Kings Bench Division by the Lord Chief Justice. In May 2019, She received the customary title of Dame Commander of the British Empire from Queen Elizabeth II at St James's Palace. She is an honorary fellow of Emmanuel College, Cambridge.

== Notable cases ==
Lambert presided over the trial of Savannah Brockhill and Frankie Smith, for the murder of Star Hobson. She also presided over the 2023 trial of David Boyd, for the murder of Nikki Allan, that had remained unsolved since 1992. She has been assigned to hear the case regarding the felling of the Sycamore Gap tree, starting 28 April 2025.

== See also ==
- 2019 Special Honours
- List of dames commander of the Order of the British Empire
