= Police Report (TV series) =

- Genre: Factual
- Presented by: Timothy Worall, Superintendent of HKP; Ricky Cheung, Inspector of HKP; Bradley Wright, Superintendent of HKP; Adrianna Chan, Senior Inspector of HKP; Mark Anstress, Chief Inspector of HKP
- Opening theme: Hero Story, Hacken Lee
- Country of origin: Hong Kong
- Original languages: Cantonese; English

Production
- Production location: Hong Kong
- Running time: 30 minutes (Cantonese); 5 minutes (English)

Original release
- Network: RTHK
- Release: 1973 – August 12, 2020

Police Report was a weekend RTHK programme in Hong Kong, similar to Crimewatch in the UK or America's Most Wanted in the United States. It was broadcast in English and Cantonese versions (broadcast as 警訊, English: Police Magazine), and each episode differed only in broadcast language and cast. Episodes in the English version were only five minutes long, and were televised on TVB Pearl on Saturdays and ATV World on Sundays, following their evening newscasts.

== Hosts ==
Generally, the current presenter for the English version was Timothy Worall, Superintendent of the Hong Kong Police Force. In certain episodes, other hosts included Senior Inspector Ricky Cheung, Superintendent Bradley Wright, Senior Inspector Adrianna Chan, and Chief Inspector Mark Anstress.

== Episode format ==
Police Report, co-produced by the HKPF and RTHK since 1973, reported on current crime trends, unresolved crimes (often involving crime scene reconstruction), traffic accidents, missing people, etc., with appeals to the public for information, as well as introducing the latest police events, gadgets, aspects, and responsibilities of different groups in the Police Force, and educating the public, e.g. how to be alert about fraudsters and, very often on how to use the emergency hotline, 999, responsibly. The reconstructions are in Cantonese, with English subtitles used in Police Magazine.

== Termination ==
RTHK gave notice in mid-July 2020 that the show would be terminated in one month's time.

== See also ==
- America's Most Wanted, similar program for the United States of America
- Crimewatch, similar program in the United Kingdom
