= Batman rapist =

Unidentified rapist

All but one of the rapes were committed in Bath, the other taking place in Kingswood.

The Batman rapist is an unidentified serial sex offender who committed at least seventeen sexual assaults on women in the city of Bath, Somerset, between 1991 and 2000. He is the subject of Britain's longest–running serial rape investigation, codenamed Operation Eagle; he has now eluded capture for more than 30 years. Detective Inspector Paul James of Avon and Somerset Constabulary, leading the operation, said it is "one of the most complicated and protracted investigations" that the force has ever undertaken. In January 2001, the Forensic Science Service used the Low Copy Number (LCN) DNA profiling technique to isolate the rapist's DNA "fingerprint". They then began the process of taking swabs for comparison from all the men, believed to be around 2,000 individuals, whose names had come up during the course of the investigation.

The perpetrator was nicknamed after leaving a baseball cap bearing a logo from the Batman film series at the scene of one attack. Police believe that there are more victims who have never come forward. The independent crime-fighting charity Crimestoppers UK have offered a £10,000 reward for information leading to his capture. The perpetrator has also been referred to in the news media as the "Riddler". The case was highlighted on the BBC's Crimewatch on 25 January 2000, including an appeal from Avon and Somerset Constabulary for information from the public. As a result of the appeal, six previously unknown victims came forward. Callers also gave the names of four potential suspects, including the son of a British diplomat, and "dozens of calls were received from prostitutes and partners of people with similar sexual habits".

== Crimes and investigation ==
The Batman rapist is believed to have a detailed geographical knowledge of Bath and operates in "a specific hunting ground". All but one of his crimes have taken place in Bath, usually in the Bathwick area of the city; the exception being the abduction and rape of a 19-year-old woman in Kingswood, near Bristol, in September 1996. The perpetrator's crimes usually take place during the darker winter months and he attacked women of all ages, and in May 2000 attempted to carjack a 26-year-old woman in Bath while her 7-year-old daughter was in the car.

The attacker targeted lone women who had just returned to their cars, abducting them at knifepoint before forcing them to drive to secluded areas in the south of the city where he then assaulted them. He removed their underwear and ripped their tights during the rapes, but then made them put them back on afterward. After raping his victim, he often forced them to drive back to the area where he abducted them.

Victims described their attacker as wearing black clothing and a baseball cap. He was slim, clean shaven and was about 5 ft 9 in (175 cm) tall with blue eyes. He had a scar below his bottom lip. In October 2000, to coincide with the end of British Summer Time, Avon and Somerset Constabulary delivered leaflets to 25,000 homes in Bath—the biggest leaflet drop in the history of British criminal investigation—asking women to complete a checklist about friends, acquaintances, neighbours or relatives who might fit the profile of:

- A white male.
- Slim or medium build.
- Aged between 30 and 50.
- Knew the Bath area well, and had some connection with Bristol, particularly the Kingswood area, and could drive a car.
- Had a fetish for tights and could persuade his consenting sexual partners to wear tights, which he may have ripped during intercourse.
- Sometimes wore a baseball cap.
- Has aroused suspicion with absences from home during the evening and early hours of the morning.

The rapist had long periods of apparent inactivity, including a three-year gap between October 1991 and November 1994, followed by a further two years of apparent inactivity until June 1996. Police suspect that there were other attacks during these lulls in activity, although a spokesman has said; "Another possibility to explain the long gaps is that this is a man who comes to the area infrequently, possibly for work reasons." His attacks may also have taken place while the rapist is between relationships. The rapist's attacks were usually between 6 p.m. and 8 p.m., "possibly on the way home from work", or between 1 a.m. and 3 a.m., and he may have had convictions for car-related crimes "because of the ease with which he breaks into vehicles."

== Murder of Melanie Hall ==
Melanie Hall (born 20 August 1970 – disappeared 9 June 1996; declared legally dead 17 November 2004) was a British hospital clerical officer from Bradford on Avon who disappeared on 9 June 1996 following a night out at Cadillacs nightclub in Bath. On 5 October 2009 a motorway worker found a plastic bin bag containing Hall's bones while he was clearing a vegetation patch on a slip road at Junction 14 of the M5 motorway. The bones in the bag included her skull, pelvis, and a thigh bone, and further remains were found buried and spread around the field by the side of the motorway. Police have not ruled out links to the Batman rapist since the unknown assailant appeared to have attempted to carjack a woman at knifepoint, leaving her wounded when she fought back and managed to escape, in the same area of the city a few hours before Hall was abducted.

== See also ==
- House for sale rapist – another unidentified UK serial rapist, who has been at large since 1979. Suspected to be John Cannan
- List of fugitives from justice who disappeared

UK cold cases where the offender's DNA is known:

- Murder of Deborah Linsley
- Murders of Eve Stratford and Lynne Weedon
- Murders of Jacqueline Ansell-Lamb and Barbara Mayo
- Murder of Julie Pacey
- Murder of Sheila Anderson
- Murder of Lindsay Rimer
- Murder of Lisa Hession
- Murder of Lyn Bryant
- Murder of Janet Brown
- Murder of Linda Cook
