= Nisha Patel-Nasri =

British police officer (1977–2006)

Nisha Patel-Nasri was a business owner and special constable in the Metropolitan Special Constabulary who was stabbed to death at her home in Wembley, London, on 11 May 2006.

Police described her murder as "atrocious and horrendous" and it was included in a list of ten prominent police deaths between 2001 and 2006 by Guardian Unlimited.

Two men, heroin dealer Roger Leslie and bouncer Jason Jones, were convicted of Patel-Nasri's murder, as was her husband, Fadi Nasri, who had been having an affair at the time and organised the murder to claim her life insurance. The trio were sentenced to life imprisonment.

== Background ==
Nisha Patel-Nasri was a 29-year-old Luton-born Hindu Gujarati British Indian who grew up in London and ran a hairdressing business near her home in Wembley. She also volunteered as a special constable in the Metropolitan Special Constabulary for the three years prior to her death.

In May 2003, she married 33-year-old Lebanese-born Fadi Nasri, in Berkshire; who ran a limousine hire company from their home. Nasri was born in Beirut in 1970. On the night before her murder, Patel-Nasri and her husband had dined out to celebrate their third wedding anniversary. However, it later emerged that Fadi had been having a secret affair with a Lithuanian prostitute at the time.

== Murder ==
Patel-Nasri's home was in a neighbourhood with generally low crime rates, but the Saturday before her murder, three men, initially believed to be burglars; attempted to enter her home but fled after they were confronted by her at around 22:00.

On the evening of 11 May 2006, Patel-Nasri was reported to have gone outside her home carrying a chef's knife. It is believed that this was the murder weapon. A man wearing a hooded top was seen running away from the scene. During the subsequent trial, it transpired that Patel-Nasri had been stabbed inside her home and had staggered outside the front door before collapsing. She died in Northwick Park Hospital as a result of a stab wound to her left thigh.

== Police investigation ==
As expensive limousines were parked outside her home the police initially tried to understand whether this could have attracted the murderer. Police also considered what could have caused her to go outside her house that night, carrying a knife. The murder weapon was found but forensic analysis failed to match the DNA on it to any person on the national database.

Patel-Nasri's widower, Fadi Nasri, was arrested on 27 February 2007 as a suspect in the case.

The murder was examined on the BBC television programme Crimewatch Solved on 6 August 2008. The programme revealed how Nasri came to be linked to the murder, despite having an alibi placing him nowhere near the scene. Through his mobile phone records on the day, police investigators linked Nasri to Roger Leslie, a known criminal and heroin dealer; to Jason Jones, a nightclub bouncer with several previous convictions; and to Tony Emmanuel, a nightclub promoter.

Through a CCTV camera near the scene where the knife was found, it was concluded that it was Emmanuel's car, a silver Audi, from which the murder weapon had been dumped. Although the number-plate could not be made out, it was identified as being Jones' car by the fact it had a non-standard roof aerial and a defective left rear number-plate light. Emmanuel could also be placed near the scene on the night of the murder. Emmanuel admitted that he had been hired by Jones to drive him to the house on the pretense of doing a drugs deal, but insisted he did not know that Jones was going to commit a murder. Through statements from Emmanuel attributed to Jones about money being counted inside the house on the night of the murder, it was concluded that Jones must have been inside and had been provided with a key. It was concluded that Jones had stabbed Patel-Nasri inside and she had staggered outside as Jones fled.

After being presented with the phone records linking the men, with investigators initially thinking the murder was carried out by Leslie as part of a feud, Nasri confessed to having paid Leslie to commit the murder. Through subsequent investigation, the police concluded the motive for the crime was monetary; through an extravagant lifestyle and a failing business, Nasri had accumulated six-figure debts. The couple had taken mutual life insurance policies three months before, which paid out £100,000. Additionally, following her death, Nasri attempted to claim his wife's entitlement to half of the equity of her parents' house from her brother, amounting to nearly £400,000. He reportedly also wanted to use the money to fund his secret affair.

=== Convictions ===
At the Old Bailey on 28 May 2008, after six days of deliberation, Emmanuel was acquitted but Nasri, Leslie and Jones were all convicted of murder by a jury majority of ten to two. The following month, Leslie was sentenced to life imprisonment with a recommended minimum tariff of eighteen years, which would keep him in prison until 2026 and the age of 56, and both Jones and Nasri were sentenced to life with tariffs of twenty years, which would keep them imprisoned until 2028 and the ages of 56 and 54 respectively.
