= Murder of Toni-Ann and Bertram Byfield =

2003 double murder in London, England

On 14 September 2003, Toni-Ann Byfield and Bertram Byfield were murdered by Joel Smith at a bedsit in Kensal Green, London. At the time of her murder, Toni-Ann was formally under the care of Birmingham social services.

On 4 August 2006, Smith was convicted of murdering seven-year-old Toni-Ann and Bertram, who was thought to be her father.

Toni-Ann was shot in the back by Smith after he had shot Bertram, a rival drug dealer, so that she could not identify his killer. Smith believed that he had committed a perfect crime, leaving no DNA or forensic evidence at the scene. Following the murders Smith, who was known as Cocaine or Caine, fled London to Liverpool. While serving a prison sentence there he was turned in by former friends and acquaintances.

== Background ==
=== Bertram Byfield ===
Bertram Byfield had been jailed in 1997 for dealing in crack cocaine. Despite his criminal background Toni-Ann, who was living under the care of Birmingham Social Services, had been allowed to visit him at his bedsit in an ex-offenders' hostel.

As well as serving time in prison Byfield, who was also known as Tony or Blacka, is believed to have been affiliated to a Jamaican drugs cartel. He had survived an attempt on his life in 2002 when he was shot six times. Bertram Byfield had believed he was Toni-Ann's father. However, post-mortem examinations revealed he was not.

=== Toni-Ann Byfield ===
Toni-Ann was staying with Bertram Byfield when they were killed. At the time of her death, she was in the care of Birmingham Social Services, who had placed her in the care of a foster family. However, when the family went on holiday, she was left with a friend of Byfield's, and was allowed to stay in Byfield's bedsit for the weekend.

Toni-Ann was seven years old at the time of her death. She was born in Jamaica but raised in the United Kingdom for most of her life. Her mother, Rosalyn Richards, did not emigrate to the UK with Toni-Ann and Byfield, but arrived in the UK soon after the murders to make an appeal to the public to assist in finding the killer. While she was in the UK, she claimed asylum but her request was rejected and she is due to be deported.

=== Joel Smith ===
Smith was born in London, he had little contact with his father and lived with his mother. He said that he was physically abused as a baby. By the age of 17 he committed his first offence, a robbery. He went on to receive 34 convictions including violence, drugs and firearms offences and robberies. He was a member of a notorious gang, the Mus Love Crew.

== Murders ==
On 13 September 2003, Smith gained entry to Byfield's property on the pretext of wanting to buy cannabis. He shot Byfield three times in his living room, using a 9mm semi-automatic. The victim grabbed a bicycle which he attempted to throw at Smith, though his body ended up entangled in the frame.

Toni-Ann had been getting ready for bed at the time. She entered the room and was shot once in the back as she attempted to flee.

== Trial ==
At the trial at the Old Bailey in 2006, Smith had denied the murders, claiming another man had admitted being the killer to him. After being found guilty Smith was jailed for life for both murders, with a recommendation that he should serve at least 40 years before being considered for parole. As a result, he is likely to remain in prison until at least 2045 and the age of 72. This sentence is one of the longest recommended minimum terms ever made by a judge or politician in England and Wales.

== Response ==
The murder provoked outrage around London and brought criticism of Birmingham Social Services to the fore. The Department of Social Services, when dealing with children, has a policy of taking the wishes of the child into serious consideration, and holds the position that placing a child with parents or other relatives is preferable to a foster family. Toni-Ann, through her own admission, was close to Byfield and had expressed a desire to be with her "father". However, criticism was made of Birmingham Social Services for failing to take into account that Byfield had recently served a prison sentence for a drug offence and was believed to still be involved in the drug trade. The murder forced the police, media and consequently the public to take a more focused stand on gun crime, which became an important issue. This case, together with a number of others including that of Victoria Climbié, raised questions about the failings and limitations of Social Services departments.
