= Rachel Hudson =

2004 murder victim

- Born: Rachel Helen Hilda Manger; 4 August 1983; Leicester, England
- Died: 17 March 2004 (aged 20); Nottingham, England
- Body discovered: at the same time
- Education: Lutterworth Grammar School
- Occupation: Hairdresser
- Spouse: Craig Hudson
- Children: two
- Parent(s): Helen Woodier and David Woodier

Rachel Helen Hilda Manger Hudson (4 August 1983 – body discovered 17 March 2004) was a British murder victim, a mother of two, murdered by her in-laws. The court tried and convicted five members of the family (dubbed "the family from hell" by the Queen's Counsel) in December 2005.

== Early life ==
Rachel Manger was the daughter of Helen and David Woodier, who separated when she was a teenager. She had two younger sisters, Jennifer and Hannah. She came from Leicestershire, where she was a student at Lutterworth Grammar School, worked as a hairdresser, and enjoyed going to funfairs. In late October 2002, she met fairground worker Craig Hudson at a funfair in Nottingham, and married him in November 2002. Her mother tried to stop the marriage, and refused to go to the wedding, considering the family "evil". She had a child from a previous relationship, and had a son with Craig.

By February 2003, she was working at the Highfields Nursing Home in Bulwell, and living with the Hudson family, on Overdale Road, in the Stockhill area of Nottingham. Co-worker Penny Taylor described her as changing from "outgoing, talkative" to "quiet and unforthcoming".

The house was overcrowded, and she and her husband moved several times, first in December 2003 to Goverton Square, Bulwell, then, after complaining to the Nottingham City Council that they were still being harassed by their overbearing family, to temporary accommodation in St Ann's, Nottingham. The family reported them missing so the police would reveal their address; Craig applied to be re-housed in Lincolnshire to escape the family's influence, but that application was rejected. When no permanent place became available, the Hudsons moved back to the family home in Stockhill, where the violence towards her began.

== Systematic abuse ==
After the attempt to escape into a home of her own with Craig, Rachel Hudson lived in the family home in Overdale Road, Stockhill as a virtual prisoner. She wasn't allowed to speak to her parents or even her husband. She was only let out of the house with 'a minder'. The Hudsons feared she would take Craig away from them. After initially siding with his wife, Craig joined the other Hudsons in participating in the abuse.

She was subjected to regular beatings, some with a baseball bat known as "Mr Woody" and a piece of wood known as "Captain Plank". She was made to eat cat food.

On 21 November 2003, the Hudsons forced Rachel to make a videotaped "confession", in which she claimed she tried to split up the family, wanted to kill her children, had stolen money from her husband, and had enjoyed working as a prostitute. This was her last recorded sighting alive, and her parents last heard from her five months before her death. From December 2003, the Hudsons denied any knowledge of where she was, and claimed she had abandoned her family to run off with another man. In January 2004, copies of a letter from Rachel were sent to her father, police and Nottingham City Council social services, saying

You must stop sending the police to the Hudsons' house. They have done nothing wrong. Please leave me being your lost little girl alone... If you start causing trouble for me I'll make sure the Hudsons make trouble for you.

== Death ==
Her battered body was found 18 March 2004, in a rolled-up carpet on the grounds of Newstead Abbey, Nottinghamshire. It weighed only six stone (84 lb; 38 kg), and was covered with burns and bruises. There were a total of 60 separate injuries. Her ear was scarred and swollen, had split in half, and become infected; her mouth was injured so much that her bottom lip had detached. She had eleven broken ribs. The ultimate cause of death had been thrombosis from a blood clot in her brain, brought on by septicaemia, dehydration and repeated assaults. The injuries were such that police at first thought they had found the body of a young boy. Police took weeks to identify her, launching an appeal on the BBC TV programme Crimewatch and consulting Interpol. She was 20 years old.

== Trial ==
On 21 December 2005, Rachel's husband, Craig Hudson; Craig's parents, Ron and Trudi Hudson; his brother Ronald; and Elisabeth Hogg, who lived with the family as the girlfriend of another brother, Shane, were convicted of her murder. The Hudson parents were sentenced to a minimum of 20 years, Ronald Junior to a minimum of 17 years, and Craig and Hogg to a minimum of 14 years each. Shane, Charlene and Emile Hudson were convicted of conspiring to pervert the course of justice by covering up the repeated abuse, and later sentenced to 4 years' imprisonment, three-and-a-half years' imprisonment and 3 years' supervision, respectively.

== See also ==
- Rosemary West
