= Pattie Coldwell =

British TV presenter and journalist (1952–2002)

- Born: Patricia Ann Coldwell; 14 May 1952; Clitheroe, Lancashire, England
- Died: 17 October 2002 (aged 50); Newbury, Berkshire, England
- Occupations: Television presenter, radio presenter, journalist
- Spouses: Tony Kerner (m. 1991; div. 1997) Evan John (m. 2002)
- Partner: Michael Wood
- Children: 1

Patricia Ann Coldwell (14 May 1952 – 17 October 2002) was a British television and radio presenter and journalist.

== Early life ==
Coldwell was born on 14 May 1952 in Clitheroe, Lancashire, the daughter of Eunice (née Salter) and Gordon Ellison Coldwell, a policeman. She attended Clitheroe Royal Grammar School for Girls before working as a secretary.

== Career ==
Coldwell started her career in local television on Granada TV as a reporter and presenter in the 1970s. She progressed to nationally networked programmes, such as Nationwide, Open Air, and, on BBC Radio 4, You and Yours. In 1988, she made a documentary for BBC1, Remembering Terry, which followed the final days and ultimate death of Aids sufferer Terry Madeley, winning an award from the Terrence Higgins Trust.

While presenting the consumer series Out of Order, Coldwell met her first husband, journalist Tony Kerner. She presented several DIY series, such as On the House , for the BBC, and Doing It Up, for Meridian, which she presented with her husband. The series won a New York television award. She was an occasional guest panellist, in the late 1980s and early 1990s, on Through the Keyhole.

In 1997, Coldwell hosted the interview show Espresso on Channel 5, and in 2001, she joined Loose Women (originally Live Talk), on ITV. Her radio work included hosting Radio 5 Live's late-night discussion programmes Night Talk and After Hours.

== Personal life and death ==
While Coldwell was working for Granada Television in the 1970s, she met historian and broadcaster Michael Wood, then working at the BBC in Manchester. The pair went on to have a ten-year relationship.

Coldwell married presenter Tony Kerner in 1991 in Camden, London. In 1992, she had a daughter, Dannie, from the marriage. Six years later, the marriage ended in divorce. In 2002, she married fisherman Evan John, in Newbury, Berkshire, having met him on a family holiday on the Caribbean Island of Bequia in 1998.

Coldwell's death resulted from a brain tumour at the age of 50; she had had breast cancer previously, being first diagnosed in 1997 and then in 1998. Coldwell died on 17 October 2002 in hospital in Newbury.

She continued to work until her death, and in her final months wrote about how she lived with terminal cancer in her Daily Express column. A week before her death, she wrote:

"I went to bed in a sulk and found myself riveted to a documentary about Thalidomide 40 years on. The drug was given to pregnant women to stop morning sickness. The tragic outcome was that several hundred children were born without arms and legs – and I think I've got problems ... Many have developed successful careers. . . One's a club entertainer who brought the house down when he boasted about getting to the front of the queue at Homebase on a Bank Holiday weekend with his mobility sticker. It's wonderful to see barriers broken down about disability through laughter. It brought me back to realising how lucky I am."
