= Antoni Imiela =

German-born convicted serial rapist

Antoni Imiela (1954 – 8 March 2018) was a German-born convicted serial rapist who grew up in County Durham, England. He was found guilty of the rape of nine women and girls, and the indecent assault, and attempted rape, of a 10-year-old girl whom he repeatedly punched and throttled. The crimes took place in Surrey, Kent, Berkshire, London, Hertfordshire and Birmingham, and the press dubbed the offender the M25 Rapist after the M25 motorway that passes in the vicinity of all those areas except Birmingham. He died in HM Prison Wakefield on 8 March 2018.

== Early life ==
Imiela was born in Lübeck, West Germany, to a Polish father and German mother. He grew up in displaced people camps until the age of 7 when the family emigrated to the United Kingdom, settling in Newton Aycliffe, County Durham. His mother abandoned the family in 1968, and shortly after that Imiela began committing crimes and was sent to youth detention centres. In 1987, he robbed a post office at gunpoint, demanding £10,000. After having committed further robberies, he was sentenced to 14 years in prison. He was released in 1996.

== Attacks ==
By September 2002, police had identified the existence of an extremely dangerous serial rapist who, an hour after one attack, had used the victim's mobile phone to taunt her mother. Often he approached his victims at speed from behind. If a victim resisted they were punched in the face; he also carried a knife. He was also dubbed the "summer rapist" and the "trophy rapist" as he sometimes stole items of clothing having forced the victim to undress.

Kent Police and Surrey Police launched a joint investigation code-named Operation Orb, and Imiela was finally caught with the use of DNA profiling. Once police had his DNA they launched a public appeal for information which resulted in a woman coming forward who expressed suspicion about her neighbour. A DNA swab test was carried out on the individual, Antoni Imiela, which enabled police to link him to the attacks. He was subsequently arrested.

On 4 March 2004, he was sentenced to seven life sentences (with eight years minimum) at Maidstone Crown Court for the crimes. He was subsequently imprisoned at Wakefield Prison in Yorkshire.

On 18 October 2010, Imiela was charged with the rape, indecent assault and buggery of a 29-year-old woman, Sheila Jankowitz, on 25 December 1987 in Forest Hill, south east London, following a case review using new forensic techniques. The victim's interview with police had been recorded and although she died in 2006, Imiela appeared at City of Westminster Magistrates' Court on 1 November 2010 and subsequently at Southwark Crown Court on 7 January 2011 to answer the charges.

On 12 March 2012, court proceedings against Imiela for the Christmas Day rape in 1987 began at the Old Bailey. A statement by the late Sheila Jankowitz, who was murdered in her native South Africa in 2006 in an unrelated crime, was read to the court by the prosecuting barrister, Richard Hearnden. This was followed by the testimony and cross-examination of the victim's mother-in-law, Jill Stevens. On the following day Erwin Jankowitz, Sheila's widower, told the Old Bailey that his wife had told him that she had heard him pass by but Imiela had his hand over her mouth and threatened to kill her if she tried to call out for help.

Imiela was found guilty of the rape, indecent assault and sexual assault of Jankowitz on 22 March 2012 and was sentenced to a further twelve years in prison. He died in prison on 8 March 2018, at the age of 63. He had suffered from a heart condition, and his death was not considered suspicious.

== Timeline ==
- 15 November 2001 – a 10-year-old girl is kidnapped from a leisure centre in Ashford, Kent and raped in woodland nearby.
- 1 July 2002 – a 12-year-old girl is raped after being abducted whilst cycling in Bracknell, Berkshire.
- 11 July 2002 – a 30-year-old woman is raped in Earlswood, Surrey. Six hours later, a 26-year-old woman is raped on Putney Common in London.
- 16 July 2002 – an 18-year-old woman is raped in Goldsworth Park, Woking, Surrey.
- 6 August 2002 – a 52-year-old woman is raped on Wimbledon Common, London.
- 7 August 2002 – a 26-year-old woman is raped in Epsom, Surrey.
- 6 September 2002 – a 13-year-old girl is taken from her bicycle and raped in Woking, Surrey.
- 16 September 2002 – a 22-year-old woman is attacked in Ripley, Surrey. The attacker is bitten by her dog, and runs off.
- 25 October 2002 – a 14-year-old girl is abducted from Stevenage, Hertfordshire and raped at knifepoint.
- 21 November 2002 – a 10-year-old girl is indecently assaulted in Birmingham.
- 8 March 2018 – he dies in Wakefield prison aged 63.

== See also ==
- List of serial rapists
