= Murder of Lisa Hession =

1984 unsolved murder of a British teenager

Lisa Jane Hession
- Lisa Hession, c. 1984
- Born: 12 April 1970; Leigh, Greater Manchester, England
- Died: 8 December 1984 (aged 14), c. 10:36 p.m. Rugby Road, Leigh, England; 53.490723°N 2.51826°W (approximate)
- Cause of death: Strangulation
- Resting place: Howe Bridge Cemetery and Crematorium, Wigan, Greater Manchester; 53.51971°N 2.51354°W (approximate)
- Occupation: Student
- Known for: Victim of unsolved child murder

Lisa Hession was a 14-year-old British schoolgirl who was sexually assaulted and strangled as she walked home from a party in Leigh, Greater Manchester, on the evening of 8 December 1984. Her body was discovered in an alleyway 200 yards (180 m) from her home approximately ninety minutes after her murder.

Described by one reporter as one of Greater Manchester's most notorious unsolved murders, Hession's murder followed a recent spate of local sexual assaults on women and girls suspected to have been committed by the same perpetrator. The coroner who conducted Hession's postmortem noted her murderer may not have intended to actually kill her, and the perpetrator is not known to have committed any subsequent sexual assaults or murders.

Despite extensive contemporary and subsequent police efforts, which have included a renewed nationwide appeal on BBC One's Crimewatch UK, Hession's murderer has never been identified, and the case remains unsolved. Advances in forensic analysis have enabled investigators to establish a partial profile of her murderer's DNA, and Greater Manchester Police have stated that obtaining a DNA swab or other sample of the perpetrator's DNA would identify the culprit.

Although officially a cold case, Hession's murder is subject to periodic review, and a £50,000 reward for information leading to the apprehension of the murderer remains on offer.

== Early life ==
Lisa Jane Hession was born on 12 April 1970 in Leigh, Greater Manchester. She was the only daughter born to Christine Hession and was raised in a single parent household on Bonnywell Road, Leigh, by her mother and widowed grandmother, Ellen "Nellie" Hession (née Draper). (Note: The Hessions moved from an address in the Higher Folds housing estate in the Wigan district of Greater Manchester to their Bonnywell Road home in 1981.)

Hession grew into a popular, confident, outgoing and academically achieving girl with a flair for athletics and gymnastics and a keen interest in both fashion and music. Although friends later described her as being a "massive fan" of David Bowie, her favourite song was "You Really Got Me" by the Kinks. She attended Bedford High School, and also ran cross-country for the amateur athletics club Leigh Harriers. A classmate and close friend named Anita Webb would later recollect of Hession: "She had a perfect physique ... Lisa had got it all, but she didn't know it, and that was the real inner beauty with her that I cherished." One of her male classmates would also later reflect: "I remember Lisa very well—she sat in class at the front. Every time I came into class, Lisa would say to me, 'Who you gawping at?' I was tall and lanky at the time."

By the time Hession began her Year 10 academic year in September 1984, she had grown to 5 ft 4 in (160 cm) and wore her wavy brown hair fairly short and with a prominent kiss curl over one eye. She also had a boyfriend two years her senior named Craig Newell and although the couple had recently separated following an argument, they had reconciled and recommenced dating in early December. The two were close, and spent much of their free time together throughout their courtships.

== 8 December 1984 ==
On the afternoon of Saturday 8 December 1984, Hession spent several hours preparing for a party she and her boyfriend planned to attend at a friend's house which several of their school friends had organized as a pre-Christmas celebration. The party was to be held at the home of their 16-year-old friend Andrew Heaton on Leigh Road, approximately two miles from Hession's own home. Hession's mother agreed to allow her daughter to attend this party on the condition she would be home by 10:30 p.m. (Note: Prior to Hession leaving home to attend this party, her mother had promised her that if she arrived home by her agreed curfew, she would be allowed to attend an upcoming school disco on Monday 10 December.) For the occasion, Hession wore a white, knee-length skirt, white ankle boots, a striped T-shirt, a red cardigan, and a blue reefer jacket. As she had recently had her hair streaked with highlights of gold and blonde in anticipation for the party, she carried a light-blue collapsible umbrella in the event of rainfall. Hession left her home in a markedly pleasant mood to attend the party at approximately 6:45 p.m.

Hession, Newell and the other attendees of the party enjoyed themselves. Possibly because Hession was the sole female to attend the party, plus that she and her boyfriend had recently reconciled their relationship, she and Newell spent most of the evening in each other's company, although they did socialize with the other attendees. Newell would later inform police that he and Hession engaged in consensual sex that evening, and that Hession left the party to walk home at approximately 10:15 p.m., first kissing him goodbye at the garden gate. (Note: The walking distance from Leigh Road to Bonnywell Road typically took Hession just shy of fifteen minutes.)

Several eyewitnesses would later inform investigators they had observed Hession walking home from the party. These sightings occurred as she walked through the town centre and onto St. Helen's Road, then subsequently turning into Buck Street at approximately 10:35 p.m. This final sighting of Hession occurred at a location approximately one minute's walk from her home.

== Murder ==
The subsequent sequence of events to occur after Hession entered Buck Street are unknown; however, she was evidently lured or forced into a nearby alleyway between Newlands Road and Rugby Road by a lone male with a sexual motivation. The location within the alleyway to where Hession was lured or forced was out of sight of all the house windows facing the alleyway.

The alleyway between Rugby Road and Newlands Road, pictured on the morning of 9 December 1984 following the discovery of Hession's body.

At this location—in a recess leading to a set of locked garage doors and a wooden garden gate—her assailant placed his hand over Hession's mouth with one hand as he fatally tightened her T-shirt around her neck with his other hand—intentionally or otherwise. Hession was also sexually assaulted, though not raped, before her assailant fled the scene. The location of Hession's murder was just 200 yards (180 m) from her own home. Subsequent police house-to-house inquiries revealed no nearby residents had seen or heard anything untoward.

=== Body discovery ===
Within minutes of Hession's curfew passing, her mother became concerned for her daughter's well-being; after telephoning the homes of several of her school friends only to learn they had not seen her daughter that evening, then "[standing] on a corner watching for her white boots to come along the pavement" before twice briefly scouring local streets and again briefly standing at the corner of Bonnywell Road, she reported her daughter missing to local police at approximately 10:45 p.m. She then searched the streets for her only child a third time before returning home, observing a police car en route. (Note: The police car Christine Hession observed had been responding to police radio reports of the body of a teenage girl having been discovered in an alleyway close to Bonnywell Road.) On three occasions, Christine Hession's searches saw her inadvertently pass the alleyway where her daughter had been murdered.

Five minutes before midnight, a local man named Ronald Parry and his 13-year-old son discovered Hession's body in the alleyway recess while walking their dog. She was lying on her back, and her clothing had been disturbed, with her skirt pulled up over her waist and her underwear torn. Parry's son ran to a nearby phone box to dial 999 as his father remained with Hession's body. A local funeral director named William Hayes soon arrived on the scene and attempted to resuscitate Hession. He would later recollect that upon arrival at the garage recess: "The little girl was lying on her back. [Her body] was very cold. There was a thin black mark around her neck and she appeared to have a black eye."

Despite the efforts by Hayes and paramedics to resuscitate Hession, she was pronounced dead on arrival at Leigh Infirmary. Her mother was initially informed a teenage girl matching her daughter's description had been "assaulted" and was receiving emergency care at this facility; she was accompanied by police to the infirmary only to learn upon her arrival that her daughter had died.

=== Postmortem ===
Hession's postmortem revealed her cause of death had been due to the acute pressure inflicted to her neck, and that this pressure was consistent with her T-shirt being tightened around her throat with one hand as her assailant had clasped his other hand over Hession's mouth to silence her screams. Bruising to her face and lips and numerous scratches upon her neck indicated Hession, who suffered from asthma, had fought desperately with her attacker before she had died. (Note: In reference to injuries sustained by Hession prior to her murder, one of the senior officers in charge of the inquiry into her death, Detective Superintendent Terrence Millard, would later state she had been "very roughly handled".) The pathologist, Geoffrey Garrett, also concluded that the bruising on her lips was consistent with Hession having been punched in the mouth at least once throughout her ordeal.

Although coroner David Blakey ruled Hession's death an unlawful killing, he did note that her murderer may not have intended to kill her.

== Investigation ==
The murder of Lisa Hession shocked and outraged the public, and Greater Manchester Police immediately launched an intense manhunt to apprehend the perpetrator, with Detective Superintendent Terrence Millard assigned overall command of the investigation.

Investigators rapidly determined the motive for the crime was sexual, and numerous factors indicated the perpetrator was either local to Leigh, or held extensive geographical knowledge of the area, leading police to initially remain optimistic that the case would be quickly solved. Within days of Hession's death, a local man had been arrested on suspicion of her murder; however, this individual was released on bail, and no further charges were ever filed against him. (Note: This individual died in 2005, having been cleared of any potential involvement in the case. He ultimately remains the only individual ever arrested on suspicion of Hession's murder.)

At a press conference for national and regional press held three days after Hession's murder, police revealed that three young women had been subjected to sexual assaults within a one-mile radius of Hession's murder in the months preceding her death, and that her murderer may also have been responsible for these previous attacks. In the first of these incidents, the victim had been attacked when walking to her home on Rugby Road behind the alleyway where Hession was assaulted and murdered. The victim in this case had reported that her assailant had approached her from behind, then placed his hand over her mouth to muffle her screams before threatening to kill her. Both other sexual assaults had seen the perpetrator threatening to kill his victim if she refused to comply with his demands.

The offender in all three cases was described as being approximately twenty years old, good-looking and wearing jogging gear. The victim of the first attack had only managed to avoid being sexually assaulted and/or raped by calmly talking to the assailant, then walking with him for 300 yards before he left her alone. The victim of this assault informed investigators that her assailant had informed her in their conversation that he "[could not] get a girlfriend" and that this had been the reason why he had resorted to sexually assaulting young women.

In the weeks following Hession's murder, police questioned over 6,000 members of the public, conducted house-to-house inquiries at over 1,300 homes across Greater Manchester, and pursued over 4,800 potential leads of inquiry. Numerous suspects, including several known sex offenders and a young man seen leering at Hession in the days immediately prior to her murder, (Note: This individual had been observed watching Hession on the Monday and Tuesday of the week of her murder. He is also known to have followed Hession home from school on Wednesday 5 December.) were questioned but eliminated from the inquiry. A reconstruction of Hession's movements on the evening of her murder was also broadcast nationally, and over 180 items of potential physical evidence underwent forensic testing.

Two-and-a-half years after Hession's murder, an individual incarcerated within a Merseyside prison was questioned with regards to his potential culpability in the crime. This 32-year-old man was first interviewed by Greater Manchester Police after investigators had been alerted by a Liverpool detective to comments this individual had made when questioned in relation to the unrelated murder of an 84-year-old woman. This individual was interviewed twice with regards to Hession's murder while detained within HM Prison Risley, although no further action was taken against him in relation to her death.

Composite drawing of the perpetrator of the previous local sexual assaults

=== Previous sexual assaults ===
In the four months prior to Hession's murder, three local women between the ages of 16 and 20 had been subjected to separate, sexually motivated attacks, all of which had occurred within a one-mile radius of the site of Hession's murder and which were described by Detective Superintendent Terrence Millard on 11 December as being potentially committed by the individual responsible for her death. In each instance, the attacker had been a young, slender and dark-haired Caucasian male, approximately eighteen to twenty years old and with markedly youthful features and a local accent, (Note: At least two of the three women subjected to these sexual assaults described the perpetrator as being "baby-faced".) and in each incident, he had threatened to kill his victim if she failed to comply with his demands.

The third of these sexual assaults had occurred on the evening prior to Hession's murder, and in this instance, the victim—a 17-year-old girl—had been threatened, then sexually fondled and pushed to the ground before striking her attacker in the groin, then fleeing the scene. A composite drawing of this individual was released to the media via a press conference in January 1985, in which Millard stated: "I do not say this man has any connection with [Hession's] murder, but I still want to talk to him." Although this composite drawing produced several new leads of inquiry, all failed to bear fruit.

==== Further local sexual assault ====
In May 1985, a further sexually motivated attack occurred in Leigh only a few hundred yards from where Hession's murder had taken place and which may have also been committed by the perpetrator of both the previous sexual assaults and potentially Hession's murder. In this instance, a young Caucasian man grabbed a young woman walking along Buck Street, struck her head against a wall and began striking her in the face until she ceased resisting him. The assailant then attempted to remove the woman's clothes, but fled the scene when disturbed by the headlights of an approaching car. The individual fled in the direction of St. Helens Road.

== Cold case ==
Despite an extensive and exhaustive contemporary police investigation, which saw 1,060 tips received from the public and numerous persons of interest questioned and eliminated as suspects, Hession's murder remained unsolved. By the late 1980s, the investigation had largely become cold, although subject to periodic review every two years. All forensic evidence retrieved from the crime scene was retained and preserved.

=== DNA profile ===
By the 2000s, advances in DNA analysis enabled investigators to obtain a partial DNA profile of Hession's murderer and in 2011, Greater Manchester Police conducted a mass swabbing exercise of men in both Leigh and Wigan in an effort to identify the perpetrator. Although this exercise failed to identify Hession's murderer, the DNA profile isolated is sufficient to identify the suspect should he be independently swabbed or his DNA be entered into the UK National DNA Database upon an unrelated matter. Investigators have stated that "all [they] need" is the perpetrator's name to compare against this DNA sample, and any public tip naming the individual responsible would result in his being identified as the perpetrator. (Note: The method of isolating a suspect's DNA and using this profile to identify perpetrators of unsolved murders came via the advancement of forensic science throughout the 1980s. The first instance in which a murderer was identified via this method and subsequently convicted occurred in 1987. In this instance, Colin Pitchfork was arrested and convicted of the sexually motivated murders of two 15-year-old girls he had committed in Leicestershire in 1983 and 1986.)

== Aftermath ==
Shortly after Hession's murder, staff and pupils at Bedford High School resolved to plant a tree within the school grounds in her memory. Funds for the memorial tree were raised via donations from pupils and staff alike, and a cherry blossom tree was chosen to be purchased. The tree was purchased from a Worsley garden centre, and planted in a quadrangle garden within the school grounds in early 1985. Although this cherry blossom tree was uprooted in a storm in 2022, a silver birch tree sapling was later planted in its place. The plaque installed at the base of the tree bears a gold inscription reading: 'In Memory of Lisa Hession. 1970 - 1984'.

In February 2005, Hession's murder—one of several of cases then-recently reopened by Greater Manchester Police's cold case unit Operation Genesis—was featured on BBC One's Crimewatch UK. Both Christine Hession and Detective Inspector Jeffrey Arnold of Greater Manchester Police appeared on this programme to directly appeal to the public for information, and this nationwide appeal resulted in twenty-seven new leads of inquiry—some of which sourced from women regarding abrupt changes in their partner's overall behaviour at the time of the murder. Several callers also named the same two suspects.

Christine Hession died in January 2016 at the age of 69 following a brief battle with cancer and having campaigned incessantly for over thirty years to identify and apprehend her daughter's murderer. Until her death, she remained convinced the perpetrator was a local man.

"Someone out there knows who murdered Lisa — I am convinced of that. Forensic techniques are improving all the time and we need that someone to give us a name, which can eliminate suspicions or lead us to the killer ... We owe it to Lisa's memory and her late mum, to ensure justice is done and no one else comes to harm."

— Martin Bottomley, head of Greater Manchester Police's cold case unit, December 2022.

Several years prior to her death, Christine Hession reflected on not knowing the identity of her daughter's murderer: "Every man I see I think, 'Did he do it?' I can't help it, and I won't be able to stop until he is found."

Although now officially a cold case, Hession's murder is subject to periodic review and fresh leads of inquiry continue to be actively pursued. The case continues to receive significant publicity, and a £50,000 reward for information leading to the arrest and conviction of her murderer remains active. (Note: A Facebook page, Justice For Lisa Hession, was created in January 2018. This social media page—created and maintained by local campaigners Ryan Daly and Andrea Aldred Ashcroft—has approximately 3,000 members and is devoted to both maintaining publicity pertaining to Hession's murder and identifying the perpetrator of the crime.)

On the fortieth anniversary of Hession's murder, locals held a candlelit vigil in her memory. All attendees were asked to bring a single tealight candle, and all retraced the route Hession took on the evening of her death, with the walk concluding outside her Bonnywell Road home, where flowers were placed by the front door. The vigil, organised by locals Ryan Daly and Andrea Aldred Ashcroft, ended with a minute's silence. (Note: Daly and Ashcroft continue to raise public awareness of Hessions's unsolved murder, primarily via social media.) On the same date, the head of Greater Manchester Police's cold case unit, Martin Bottomley, issued a statement emphasizing that police remained committed to apprehending the culprit.

The most recent nationwide appeal for information leading to the apprehension of Hession's murder was broadcast upon Crimewatch Live in March 2025. One of the individuals interviewed in this episode was the current chief reporter for the Manchester Evening News, Neal Keeling, who in 1984 had reported on the case as a junior reporter with the Bolton Evening News and who recollected: "This case has remained with me for forty years ... There's just a handful that you never forget, and this is one of those."

== Media ==
=== Bibliography ===
- Marriner, Brian (1994). "Murderer of Childhood". True Crime Detective Monthly (August 1994 ed.). Magazine Design & Publishing Ltd. pp. 10–14. ISSN 0261-264X.
- Newton, Michael (2004). The Encyclopedia of Unsolved Crimes. New York: Facts on File. ISBN 978-0-816-07818-9.
- Sanders, John (2016). "Death of a Serial Killer". True Detective Monthly (April 2016 ed.). Magazine Design & Publishing Ltd. pp. 14–15. ISSN 0041-350X.

=== Television ===
- The BBC have broadcast a documentary focusing on the murder of Lisa Hession as part of their Crimewatch documentary series. Titled Every Parent's Nightmare, This 44-minute documentary was first broadcast on 4 March 2025.

== See also ==
- Child sexual abuse
- Cold case
- DNA analysis – Medical test to identify changes in DNA or chromosomes
- Forensic science – Application of science to law and investigation
- List of solved missing person cases: 1950–1999
- List of unsolved murders in the United Kingdom (1980s)

== Cited works and further reading ==
- Appleyard, Nicholas (2009). Life Means Life: Jailed Forever: True Stories of Britain's Most Evil Killers. London: John Blake Publishing. ISBN 978-1-476-60808-2.
- Barker, Francis (1984). Confronting the Crisis War, Politics and Culture in the Eighties: the Proceedings of the Essex Sociology of Literature Conference. University of Essex. ISBN 978-0-901-72622-3.
- Basannavar, Nick (2021). Sexual Violence Against Children in Britain Since 1965: Trailing Abuse. Macmillan Publishers Ltd. ISBN 978-3-030-83148-6.
- Cawthorne, Nigel (2007). The Mammoth Book of Killers at Large. London: Constable & Robinson Ltd. ISBN 978-1-845-29631-5.
- Drake, Phillip (2024). Unsolved Murders of the UK: Cold Cases from 1951 to Present Day. Barnsley: Pen and Sword. ISBN 978-1-399-03259-9.
- Dunning, John (1987). Mindless Murders. London: Mulberry Editions. ISBN 978-1-873-12333-1.
- Evans, Colin (1996). The Casebook of Forensic Detection: How Science Solved 100 of the World's Most Baffling Crimes. New York City: John Wiley & Sons Inc. ISBN 0-471-07650-3.
- Fido, Martin (2001). A History of British Serial Killing: How Britain's Most Famous Serial Killers Were Identified, Caught and Convicted. London: Carlton Publishing Group. ISBN 978-1-842-22204-1.
- Greig, Charlotte (2016). Cold Cases: Astonishing investigations from The Green River Killer to JonBenet Ramsay. London: Arcturus Publishing. ISBN 978-1-785-99858-4.
- Hayhurst, Alan (2012). Greater Manchester Murders. Cheltenham: History Press. ISBN 978-0-752-48385-6.
- Holmes, Ronald M.; Holmes, Stephen T. (2002). Profiling Violent Crimes: An Investigative Tool. Los Angeles: Sage Publications. ISBN 978-0-761-92594-1.
- Innes, Brian (2000). Bodies of Evidence. London: Amber Books Ltd. ISBN 978-1-856-05623-6.
- Lawless, Christopher (2022). Forensic Science: A Sociological Introduction. New York: Taylor & Francis Group. ISBN 978-1-000-54343-8.
- McRery, Nigel (2013). Silent Witnesses: A History of Forensic Science. London: Random House Books. ISBN 978-1-847-94683-6.
- Pettem, Silvia (2013). Cold Case Research: Resources for Unidentified, Missing, and Cold Homicide Cases. Boca Raton: CRC Press. ISBN 978-1-466-57053-5.
- Wilson, Colin (1995). Written in Blood: A History of Forensic Detection. Glasgow: HarperCollins. ISBN 978-0-58620-842-7.
- Wyre, Ray; Tate, Timothy (1995). The Murder of Childhood: Inside the Mind of One of Britain's Most Notorious Child Murderers. Hampshire: Waterside Press. ISBN 978-1-909-97662-7.
- Yount, Lisa (2007). Forensic Science: From Fibers to Fingerprints. New York City: Chelsea House Publishing. ISBN 978-1-604-13061-4.
