= Murder of Sheila Anderson =

1983 notorious Scottish unsolved murder

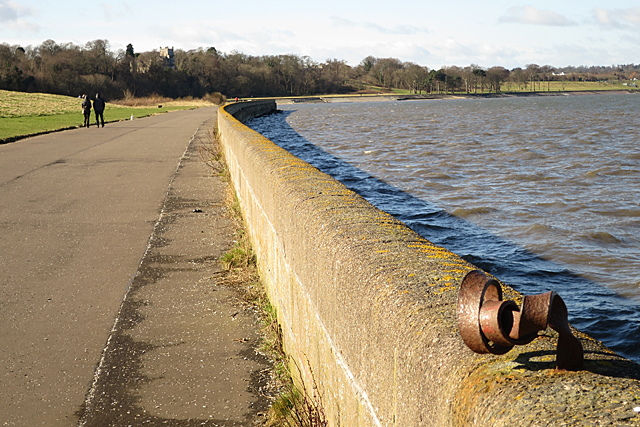
- Top: Anderson shortly before her death Bottom: The location on Gypsy Brae promenade on which the killer ran over Anderson, and where her body was found
- Date: 7 April 1983
- Time: About 11:54 pm
- Location: Promenade on Gypsy Brae, Edinburgh, Scotland; 55.98238°N 3.25434°W
- Cause: Run over intentionally and dragged by a vehicle
- Motive: Unknown, intentional targeting of a sex worker

The murder of Sheila Anderson (1955/1956 – 7 April 1983) was the 1983 murder of a sex worker in Edinburgh which has been described as "one of Scotland's most notorious unsolved murders". 27-year-old mother Anderson was found run over, possibly repeatedly, on the promenade at Gypsy Brae after she had sex with a client there. Anderson was known to have been confrontational with clients and for having stood in front of their cars if they refused to pay, leading investigators to conclude that she may have been run over after such a disagreement.

Forensics showed that the killer's car was painted red and also would have been heavily damaged by the act, with police still appealing for anyone who remembers their partner suspiciously coming home with a damaged car around 1983 to come forward. Appeals have also been made for information from anyone who was given a sexually transmitted disease by their partner around this time since it was found that there was a 50% chance the killer would have had to seek treatment for one after the murder. Anderson's missing bag was found dumped after the killing at a car park by the A1 road going south from Edinburgh into England, suggesting that her killer may have travelled back to England after the murder.

A full DNA profile of the killer was isolated in 2009, leading to renewed hopes that the killer could be caught and new appeals on Crimewatch. The case has also been noted for the long-term impact it had nationally in terms of changing police attitudes and procedures in regard to sex workers, and the case continues to receive publicity.

== Murder ==
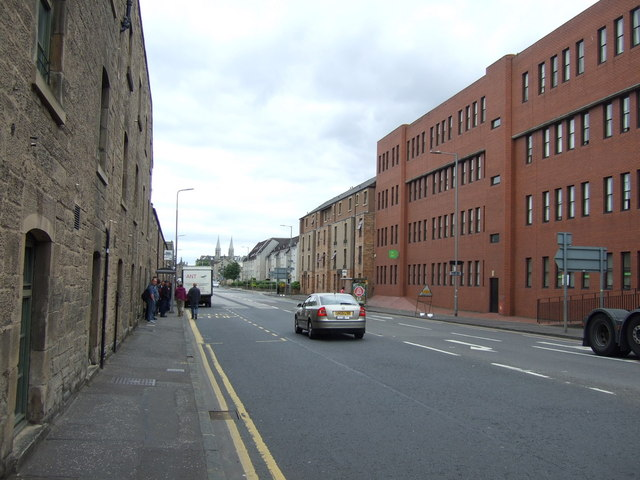
Anderson was picked up by her killer while soliciting on Commercial Street in Leith, pictured. She was last seen only 30 minutes before she was found dead at Gypsy Brae, being sighted talking to a man by Lyndean House, shown on the right. It is now a Job Centre.

Anderson was a 27-year-old mother who had two children. At the time of their mother's murder, her children were aged only two and seven. Anderson worked as a sex worker, with her family stating that she had "got in with the wrong crowd" and become involved in drugs. Her drug use had apparently made her argumentative and confrontational, and she was known to be so with clients.

At around 11:45 pm on 7 April 1983, a CB radio enthusiast was parked by the coast at Gypsy Brae, Edinburgh, a popular spot for CB radio users as it provided clear reception across the water from the Edinburgh seafront to Fife. That night the radio user spotted the headlights of a car which was unusually driving right by the seafront on the promenade, where cars never usually drove, so he went to go and investigate. When he drove over to where he had seen the vehicle driving, he found the body of Anderson, who had been brutally murdered. She had been run over and dragged by the vehicle he had seen for a considerable distance, and the evidence showed that the car had run over her body at least once. Her belongings were found scattered across the crime scene. Her watch, found next to her body, had stopped at 11:54pm, possibly the exact time of her death. Her underwear was missing and never found, so was presumably taken by the attacker.

Anderson had been seen in the Leith area of Edinburgh earlier that night, an area with a well-known red light district and also with a number of heroin users. The drug-addicted sex workers were said to be "easy targets" for predators. Anderson was regularly soliciting sex work on the streets of Leith and was well-known, including to police. At around 11:25 pm that night, only about 30 minutes before her death, there had been a confirmed sighting of Anderson outside Lyndean House on Commercial Street in Leith, as two police officers had spoken to her and seen her speaking to a man. It was around this time that she departed with the client that would kill her. Investigators found that Anderson had indeed had sex with the man she had gone with to Gypsy Brae, but could not explain why she had then been killed by the man. Investigators would come to believe that it was likely that Anderson had been killed by the client after she had reacted to being unfairly treated by him or not paid, since she was known to be confrontational with clients. She had potentially then stood in front of the car until the client paid, but the murderer then responded by running her down. Other sex workers recounted that Anderson had previously stood in front of client's car if they refused to pay, not allowing them to drive off until they did.

== Investigations ==
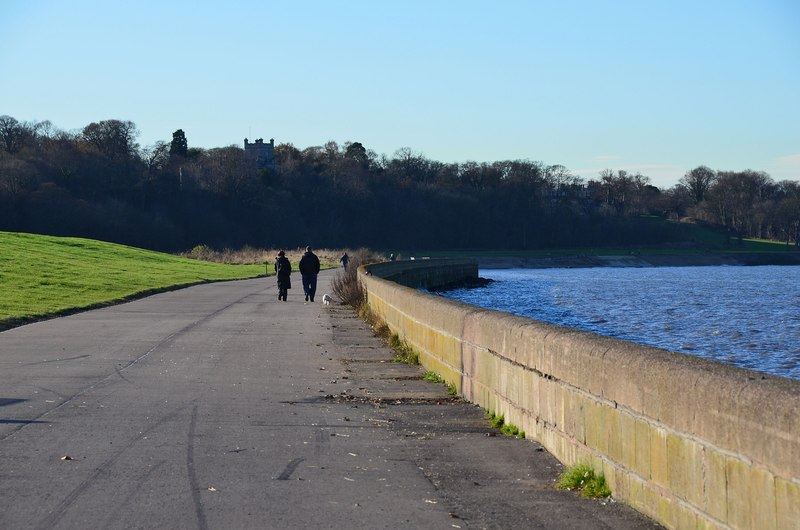
The site of the murder in 2012

Investigators found that the killer's car would have been heavily damaged by the act, and possibly written off. Deep red vehicle paint was found on Anderson's clothes, indicating the killer's car was red. It appeared to have come from an overspray of the underside of a rusty car. Appeals have been made for anyone whose partner came home at some point in 1983 with a damaged car, potentially with a suspicious story about how they'd got the damage, to come forward. It was found that there was a 50% chance that the killer would have a sexually transmitted disease, which he could potentially have given to his partner and would be remembered by them, causing to police appealing for anyone who remembers being given an STD by a partner around 1983 to come forward. The man would have had to have sought treatment for this very soon after the crime.

Investigators did not know whether the man had lived in Edinburgh, or had just worked there, potentially on nearby oil rigs or in construction. The theory that the man may have only been in the area for work was supported by the mysterious discovery of Anderson's handbag, which was dumped in a car park 17 miles away from the murder scene by the A1 road, which is a key road that goes south from Edinburgh over the border into England. Therefore, there was a theory that the killer may have come to the area for work purposes from England, then travelled back via this road.

On two occasions, a sex worker contacted police saying she had information on the murder, leading to hope that Anderson's killer could be brought to justice. Although she twice agreed to meet up with officers, she never turned up.

== Impact ==
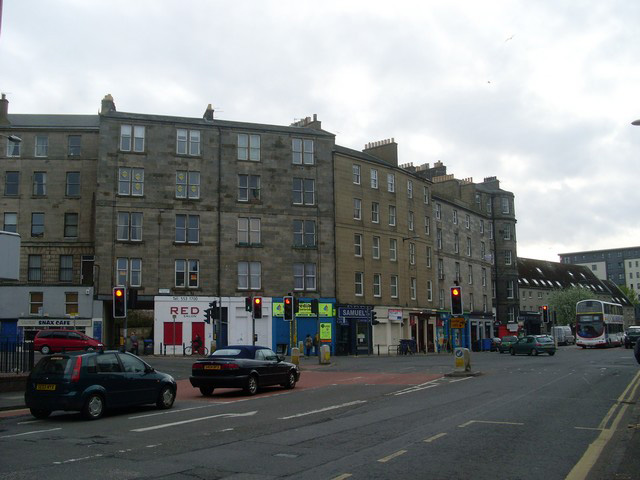
Only 30 minutes before she was found dead, Anderson was seen by two police officers just behind where this photo was taken, at the junction of Commercial Street and North Junction Street in Leith

Anderson's murder is notable for how it changed the policing of sex work in Britain and elsewhere. The police realised the importance of trying to build better relations with sex workers so they would be more likely to share crucial information with investigators. It was realised that this change in attitudes would make it easier to gain trust from those such as the sex worker who had come forward twice saying she held crucial information but never met up with officers when arranged. The case also led to the setting up of "tolerance zones" for sex workers and saw the introduction of forms of police protection for sex workers in Edinburgh.

== Continuing publicity ==
"With the passage of time, relationships change. People fall out with each other, people die. All you need to do is prod the right bit, the right nerve, and somebody will say 'wait a minute, I remember that time. Such-and-such so-and-so, he had a red car, and he subsequently got convicted for indecencies against this-and-that'. That's the sort of phone call we want, and that's the kind of phone call we're getting, and I hope we'll get some more [due to this programme]"

— Former Detective Inspector Tom Wood, part of the Anderson murder investigation team, speaking on David Wilson's Crime Files in 2022.

The case continued to be re-investigated as a cold case and returned to the news in 2008 when it was revealed that investigators were carrying out modern forensic analysis of the evidence. The case subsequently featured on Crimewatch in February and March 2009, on which it was revealed that a full DNA profile of the killer had been isolated. It was pointed out that any names that the public volunteered as possible suspects could be easily eliminated with the new DNA, and so detectives appealed for people to submit any information they felt they had as it could easily solve the case.

In 2021, The Simpsons star Yeardley Smith (voice of Lisa Simpson) produced a podcast on the case.

In 2022, the case was featured on an episode of the BBC series David Wilson's Crime Files, on which former Detective Inspector Tom Wood, who was part of the investigation and described as "one of the icons of Scottish policing", spoke to Wilson. Wood insisted that the case could be solved.

Anderson's case has been described as "one of Scotland's most notorious unsolved murders" and continues to receive publicity.
