= List of unsolved murders in the United Kingdom (1970s) =

This is an incomplete list of unsolved murders in the United Kingdom that were committed between 1970 and 1979. The list excludes any murders in Northern Ireland related to The Troubles, or that are related to IRA bombings which occurred in England.

Victims believed to have been killed by the same perpetrator(s) are grouped together below.

== 1970 ==
Year	Victim(s)	Location of body or bodies	Notes
January 1970	Allan Graham	Ponteland, Northumberland	11-year-old Graham went missing during a trip to the shop while he was staying with his older brother and his wife in Gerald Street, Benwell, Newcastle, on 24 January 1970. His body was found in a ditch near Ponteland – about seven miles northwest of Newcastle – the following day. He had been strangled. No one has ever been arrested in connection with Graham's death.
January 1970	Ann Smith	Epsom, Surrey	20-year-old Smith, a prostitute from Tooting in south London, was last seen on 27 January 1970. Her partly clothed body was discovered the day after in a ditch on Epsom Downs. She had been beaten and strangled, with the latter being the cause of her death. Detectives came to rule out any links to the Hammersmith nude murders or to "Yorkshire Ripper" Peter Sutcliffe.
February 1970	Albert Cox	Pimlico, London	69-year-old Cox was found dead at his bedsit in Moreton Place, Pimlico, on 28 February 1970. He had been bound and gagged, dying from suffocation as a result of the gagging, and the money that had been in the property was all missing. In 1975, police linked Cox's murder to five others, including the then-recent slaying of Thomas Bradford Wilson (also described in this list), but two of these were later solved.
March 1970	Jacqueline Ansell-Lamb	Mere, Cheshire	18-year-old Ansell-Lamb was hitchhiking from London to Manchester on 8 March 1970 the last time she was seen. A 10-year-old boy discovered her body six days later in Square Wood, Mere, near Knutsford. She had been strangled with an electrical cord and sexually assaulted. Detectives from the Cheshire and Derbyshire constabularies appeared together on Crimewatch in 1991 to appeal for information about Ansell-Lamb's murder and that in October 1970 of a woman named Barbara Mayo. Reconstructions of some of the victims' last movements featured in the episode as well, with the narrator remarking on the "striking similarities" the two cases had to each other. It is often erroneously reported that Ansell-Lamb and Mayo's murders were proven to be linked by DNA in 1990; a DNA profile has only ever been extracted in the Mayo case, and this did not happen until 1997.
March 1970	Susan Long	Aylsham, Norfolk	Long, 18, went to the Gala Ballroom in Norwich and caught a night bus home to Aylsham on 10 March 1970. The bus arrived at Market Place in the town at around 11:10 p.m., but Long never made it to her parents' home, which was a seven-minute walk away. Her body was found in a lovers' lane the following morning. Police confirmed on the 50th anniversary of the Norwich Union clerk's murder that they had DNA from the crime scene that could uncover the identity of the man who sexually assaulted and strangled her.
March 1970	Philip Green	Shirehampton, Bristol	11-year-old Green left his home in Sea Mills on 31 March 1970 to collect lost golf balls on the nearby Shirehampton golf course. His battered body was found the following day in a wooded area of the course. Green's case remains unsolved despite a massive police inquiry, which was assisted by Scotland Yard. A detective from Avon & Somerset Constabulary made a fresh appeal for information on the 40th anniversary of the murder.
May 1970	Helen Kane	Edinburgh	The body of Kane, 25, was left on a building site in Dumbiedykes after she had been hit over the head with a rock, paving slab or large stone following a night out in May 1970. Police quizzed Angus Sinclair about the mother-of-four's murder because he lived in Edinburgh and had been locked up for six years for killing a young girl, but as evidence linking him to Kane was lacking and someone had vouched for an alibi he had given, he was not charged.
October 1970	Barbara Mayo	Ault Hucknall, Derbyshire	On 12 October 1970, 24-year-old Mayo, a trainee teacher, set off from her London home to hitchhike north. Six days later her body was discovered in woodland near Hardwick Hall, close to the northbound carriageway of the M1. She had been raped and strangled. A police officer said in 1997 that he believed that DNA recovered from one of Mayo's garments would lead to the culprit's identity becoming known.
November 1970	Andre Mizelas	Hyde Park, London	The 48-year-old royal hairdresser was found shot dead in his car on 9 November 1970. A motive is not known, but a private detective who spoke to him over the telephone three days earlier said Mizelas told him he wanted him to keep tabs on two men whose names he would disclose at a meeting scheduled for 10 November.

== 1971 ==
Year	Victim(s)	Location of body or bodies	Notes
January 1971	James Keltie	Blairgowrie, Perthshire	Keltie, 52, was murdered on 11 January 1971 at Blairgowrie's Muirton House Hotel, which he ran. He was bound, gagged and beaten in the hotel before being dragged out to a garage in the grounds. Keltie was still alive when found, but he died of his injuries on the way to hospital. The phone lines to the hotel had been cut and there was speculation that the attack had been a robbery gone wrong.
April 1971	Lena Farr	Stotfold, Bedfordshire	Farr, 77, was found dead in a chair in the sitting room of her home on Brook Street, Stotfold, on 12 April 1971. Her face, skull and left hand had cuts and bruises on them, but it was strangulation that caused the widow's death.
April 1971	Dorothy Leyden	Manchester	17-year-old Leyden went to a Jimmy Ruffin concert at the Golden Garter nightclub in Wythenshawe, Manchester, on Saturday 24 April 1971 before getting a taxi into central Manchester with friends. She got out of the taxi at Piccadilly Gardens bus station at about 2:30 a.m. on 25 April, and it is believed she was planning to catch a bus home but decided to walk instead to save money. Leyden's body was found after dawn that day on wasteland behind the Spread Eagle pub on Rochdale Road, Collyhurst. She had been raped and beaten to death with a brick. It was later thought that the offender might have been serial killer Trevor Hardy, but DNA eliminated him as a suspect in 2008.
May 1971	Rose Lifely	Bournemouth, Dorset	Lifely, 73, was stabbed to death in her home on Northcote Road, Bournemouth, between 15 and 17 May 1971. She suffered a "maniacal attack", according to police, who believed that the assailant lived in the local area, broke into the residence to steal and repeatedly stabbed her when confronted by her. On 25 May, the Evening Times reported that investigators were hunting for a "cuddly" buxom 18-year-old blonde and two youths, who had gone to second-hand shops in Bournemouth attempting to sell jewellery similar to pieces missing from Lifely's home.
May 1971	Patrick Walsh	Holloway, London	26-year-old Walsh's body was discovered in his van on 22 May 1971. He had been stabbed, and, according to detectives of the time, probably by a fellow motorist with whom he had become embroiled in an argument.
June 1971	Gloria Booth	Ruislip, Middlesex	Booth's naked body was discovered on the morning of Sunday 13 June 1971 on a recreation ground off Nairn Road, approximately half a mile from South Ruislip Underground station and a mile from the scene of the murder of Jean Townsend 17 years earlier. Like Townsend, Booth – a 29-year-old housewife from Ealing – had died from strangulation, and it appeared that, as in the Townsend killing, a scarf had been used.
August 1971	John Augustus Roden Orde	Colney Heath, Hertfordshire	On 26 August 1971, 45-year-old Orde was shot on his farm at Colney Heath during a run-in with a group of people trying to steal the rear number plate of his car. A man said by his sister to have admitted killing him was acquitted.
October 1971	Susan Turner	Hartlepool, County Durham	The 19-year-old newlywed's strangled corpse was discovered in a derelict house by two schoolboys playing there during their lunchbreak on 22 October 1971. Her widower was accused of murder at a trial that took place the following February, but the paucity of evidence against him (forensic scientists had found no trace of dust from the abandoned building in the property where he resided) prompted the judge to order the jury to deliver a verdict of not guilty.

== 1972 ==
Year	Victim(s)	Location of body or bodies	Notes
January 1972	Stan James	Gowerton, near Swansea	James's body was found in the living room of his house on Sterry Road on 30 January 1972. He had been bound, gagged and beaten during a burglary at the property the night before. Two men were charged with the 79-year-old retired greengrocer's murder in 1979 and later cleared.
February 1972	Harry Barham	Stratford, London	The fatal Valentine's Day shooting of Barham, a 53-year-old bookmaker, in his car on Windmill Lane in Stratford was followed by the theft of between £20,000 and £40,000 from the vehicle. He had made the money by buying and reselling cheap jewellery to help pay off debt he owed.
April 1972	Isaac Hughes and Arthur Waite	Blaenavon, Torfaen	70-year-old Hughes and 50-year-old Waite, a friend of his, were killed in Hughes's cottage in the small Welsh mining town. Hughes was hit on the head once with a blunt object and Waite was hit numerous times with the same object, and they were found dead there two days after Easter Monday – a day they had spent much of at the local pub. Because there was no evidence that anyone had been in the cottage without permission that Monday or on the day that followed, police believed that the victims had known their killer.
April 1972	Harold Fisher	Cardiff	54-year-old Fisher was fatally stabbed outside the Avana bakery on Pendyris Street in Cardiff during a robbery on 14 April 1972.
April 1972	Maxwell Confait	Catford, London	Two youths locked up in November 1972 for the killing of Maxwell Confait (a 26-year-old transgender sex worker also known as Michelle) and arson at her residence, plus a third youth sentenced to serve four years at the Royal Philanthropic School in Redhill (Surrey) for burglary and arson, were acquitted in October 1975. Strangulation was the cause of the victim's death. In 1980, a prisoner became a suspect in Confait's murder when an incriminating conversation between him and a fellow inmate was overheard, but because he and the person he claimed to have been with at the time of the offence each maintained that it was the other who committed it, neither of them could be charged with it. The case led to changes in police procedures.
June 1972	Judith Roberts	Tamworth, Staffordshire	14-year-old Roberts was found battered to death in a field not far from her home in Wigginton, a village just north of Tamworth. A teenager recently discharged from Whittington Barracks confessed to her murder and was convicted; however, he later claimed that his confession was a result of psychological problems he was experiencing at the time. The Court of Appeal overturned his conviction in 1997 – 24 years after his trial at Birmingham Crown Court – based on new psychiatric evidence.
July 1972	Meryl Barnes	Paddington, London	A four-storey building housing the 24-year-old university lecturer's bedsit was set alight on purpose in the early hours of 28 July 1972, killing her and causing others to require hospital treatment. The Old Bailey acquitted a man of murder and arson after it had been alleged that he might have started the fire because financial difficulties made him crave insurance money (the lease on the building, which was on Albion Street in Paddington, had been bought in his wife's name) or because he thought his wife had it in mind to leave him for a tenant living on the first floor.
July 1972	Pauline Riolo	Liverpool	Riolo, a 29-year-old married mother-of-three, had at least three stab wounds when she was found dying in Mulgrave Street, Toxteth, Liverpool, on 29 July 1972. Police wanted to trace someone she was seen with (a man who was driving a blue Ford Capri and appeared to be in his late 30s) 10 to 15 minutes prior to receiving the injuries.
September 1972	Emmy Werner	Bayswater, London	68-year-old Werner was strangled to death while staying at the Queens Hotel in Bayswater – apparently by someone who went into her room to steal and killed her when she awoke. A 16-year-old boy was charged with her murder, but a jury acquitted him in 1973. Almost 45 years after that acquittal, the Metropolitan Police reappealed for information that might help them identify who was responsible for Werner's death and offered a £20,000 reward.
November 1972	Amala Ruth De Vere Whelan	Maida Vale, London	22-year-old Whelan was found dead at her home in Randolph Avenue, Maida Vale, west London, on 16 November 1972. She had been beaten, raped, and strangled, but the subsequent investigation failed to link anyone to the crime. Police issued a fresh appeal for information in January 2017.
December 1972	Nora Wilfred	Cardiff	Wilfred, 33, was murdered on 2 or 3 December 1972. A married mother-of-four and a prostitute at the time, Wilfred received 23 stab wounds, and some of her clothing, along with her handbag, was stolen from her. Her body was found on the morning of 3 December on waste ground off Pugsley Lane, Herbert Street, Butetown, Cardiff.
December 1972	Helen Will	Longtown, Cumbria	54-year-old Will was strangled. She was from the Scottish city of Aberdeen but her body was just over the border in England when it was discovered in a wood on the weekend of 23–24 December 1972. A lorry driver's conviction for Will's murder was overturned in 1981 after the forensic evidence that was used to help convict him failed to stand up to closer scrutiny.

== 1973 ==
Year	Victim(s)	Location of body or bodies	Notes
January 1973	Martha Graham	Swinton, Manchester	65-year-old Graham was killed at her home in Swinton by being battered around the head with a rolling pin and a bottle on 16 January 1973. Her husband was acquitted of murder in March of the following year at the close of a trial at Manchester Crown Court.
March 1973	James Cockerell	Leeds	65-year-old Cockerell's body was discovered at his flat in the Hyde Park area of Leeds on 2 March 1973. He had been killed with a weapon thought to have been a blunt household knife, and his pockets had been turned inside out. A jury at Leeds Crown Court found a 39-year-old labourer not guilty of the widower's murder the following autumn.
March 1973	Ann Law	Body not found	34-year-old Ann Law, a mother-of-two, went missing from her home on Copperas Lane, West Denton, Newcastle, on 24 March 1973. She was in the process of divorcing her husband Gilbert Law, but the couple still lived together. Gilbert was questioned about his wife's disappearance in 1975, but not charged. In 1982 he allegedly confessed to his son, his son-in-law and a friend that he had buried her on the bank of the River Tyne near Bywell. After his arrest, Gilbert allegedly told police that Ann had drunk herself to death and, later, that he had strangled her. He then denied making any confession. Gilbert stood trial in 1983, but this was halted due to his mental state. At his next trial in June 1984, the judge ordered the jury to acquit him of murder. No one else has ever been charged in connection with Ann's disappearance or murder and her body has never been found, despite extensive excavations of the riverbank in 1982.
March 1973	Mary Armstrong	Stoke-on-Trent, Staffordshire	Armstrong was a 32-year-old prostitute stabbed to death on 25 March 1973 and found later that day in a car park in Hanley. Four trials for her murder were held, with a 33-year-old man being cleared at the end of the last one. The number of days covered by the trials (63 in total) caused the case to make legal history in Britain.
April 1973	Velma Murray	Coventry, West Midlands	Murray, a 15-year-old Jamaican girl, died of carbon monoxide poisoning when paraffin and a propane gas cylinder were used to create an explosion at 143 Rotherham Road, Holbrooks, Coventry, early on 28 April 1973. She was staying at the house with a friend of her mother's. A Birmingham magazine opposed to racism offered a £500 reward for information in 1976.
May 1973	Christine Markham	Body not found	Just after boarding a bus without her to take them to different schools on the morning of 21 May 1973, nine-year-old Markham's 10-year-old brother and 13-year-old sister looked out of a window and saw her double back on herself instead of continuing to walk in the direction of her own school. That evening, when she had not come home, a police hunt began that led to around 5,000 residences within a 15-mile radius of her house in Scunthorpe (Lincolnshire) being searched, but no trace of her was found. Robert Black, a serial killer known to have murdered at least four young girls, is suspected of being behind Markham's disappearance.
June 1973	Mary Ann Mackey	Newcastle	Mackey, an 80-year-old woman whom locals knew as Old Polly, was battered over the head and stabbed in the face on the afternoon of 18 June 1973 before being found in a back lane close to her home.
July 1973	Heidi Mnilk	London	17-year-old Mnilk was stabbed and thrown from a train as it travelled between London Bridge and New Cross railway stations on 8 July 1973. Serial killer Patrick Mackay claimed responsibility for the German's death but later withdrew his confession.
July 1973	Bridgid Hynds	Kentish Town, London	74-year-old Bridgid Hynds, a spinster also known as Mary Hynds, was battered to death with a lead pipe at her home in Willes Road, Kentish Town, on 20 July 1973. In a statement to the police that contained accurate information about the residence, serial killer Patrick Mackay said he was sure that he was the offender. Later, however, he told them that the murder was not one of his, and a judge left Hynds's case to lie on file. Official records indicate that Mackay was in custody at the remand centre in Ashford, Surrey, when Hynds was killed, but it has been observed that the staff situation there in July 1973 might have made it possible for an inmate to escape and return without anyone noticing.
September 1973	Iris Thompson and Caroline Woodcock	Brentwood, Essex	53-year-old Thompson and 79-year-old Woodcock (Thompson's mother) were battered and stabbed on 11 September 1973 at the Shenfield address they shared with Thompson's husband, who had left to go to work a short time before the killings. No sign of a forced entry was discovered.
September 1973	Wendy Sewell	Attacked in Bakewell, died in hospital in Chesterfield (both in Derbyshire)	The 32-year-old typist was savagely beaten in a cemetery on 12 September 1973, and later died of her wounds. Cemetery groundskeeper Stephen Downing was convicted and served 27 years for her murder, but the verdict was eventually overturned on appeal. The case was re-investigated by police, but no further arrests were made.
September/October 1973	Jacqueline Johns	Battersea, London	16-year-old Johns was suffocated after attending a friend's wedding in Leigh-on-Sea in Essex on 29 September 1973 and being given a lift to Upminster that night to catch a train to Victoria Station in central London. Her naked body was found at the southern end of Chelsea Bridge on 1 October. It was believed that the insurance clerk may have become stranded at Victoria Station as a result of missing the last train to Norbury, which would have taken her to near her home in the Thornton Heath area of south London. Serial killer Robert Black's involvement in the slaying has been suspected.
October 1973	Jacqueline Seston	Peterborough, Cambridgeshire	15-year-old Seston was found stabbed to death and sexually assaulted at her home in Mountsteven Avenue, Peterborough, on 2 October 1973. Her sister's boyfriend was convicted of murder in April 1974, but his conviction was overturned in March 1979. It was overturned because in spite of the claim that the "silent" clock at Peterborough Railway Station would not have made the clicking sound he said he heard coming from it at 1:15 p.m. on the day Seston was killed, the appeal judges were told that a worn spindle meant there were times when it did make such a sound after all.
October 1973	Warren and Elizabeth Wheeler	Boars Hill, Oxfordshire	Warren Wheeler, 82, and his wife Elizabeth, 75, were found battered to death at their home, Yatscombe Cottage, in the hamlet of Boars Hill, on 9 October 1973. A man stood trial in 1974 after confessing to the murders, but the judge directed that he be cleared, stating that he was an attention seeker and that it was not his first false murder confession.
October 1973	Harry Taylor	Glasgow	On 13 October 1973, in his top-floor flat in Crowlin Crescent, Cranhill, Glasgow, 50-year-old Taylor suffered extensive wounds in a murder that was to be branded one of the city's most brutal. A ransacked bedroom and missing property led to the hypothesis that he disturbed and was attacked by a burglar after returning home from drinking at a hotel, but the idea that the killer was known to him could not be ruled out.

== 1974 ==
Year	Victim(s)	Location of body or bodies	Notes
January 1974	Stephanie Britton and Christopher Martin	Barnet, London	57-year-old Britton and four-year-old Martin, Britton's grandson, were found stabbed to death in a house in Hadley Green Road, Barnet, on 12 January 1974. Serial killer Patrick Mackay was suspected but never admitted to being their assailant.
January 1974	Glenis Carruthers	Clifton, Bristol	The 20-year-old student teacher from Little Chalfont in Buckinghamshire was found strangled on Clifton Down on Saturday 19 January after she had left a friend's 21st birthday party at about 10 p.m.
February 1974	Neil McCann	Edinburgh	37-year-old McCann was beaten and stabbed in Craigmillar, Edinburgh, on 20 February 1974 after getting off a bus. A man told a newspaper in 2008 that he believed that he and not McCann was the intended target and that gangster Arthur Thompson helped to arrange the attack.
February 1974	Rosie Hilliard	Leicester	On 22 February 1974, the 24-year-old prostitute was strangled, run over (probably at least twice) and found dead hours later on a building site near Spinney Hill Road. Being run over caused her to sustain fractures to her skull and elsewhere, and it was these injuries that killed her.
March 1974	Kay O'Connor	Colchester, Essex	Someone smashed the glass of the back door of 37-year-old O'Connor's house on Wickham Road in Colchester to gain access to the building before beating, strangling and stabbing her in the kitchen on Friday 1 March 1974. A woman came forward in 2018 to say that 44 years previously, one of her then co-workers told her in private that he was that person.
April 1974	Caroline Allen	Near Old Dalby, Leicestershire	Allen, a 17-year-old schoolgirl from Kinoulton in Nottinghamshire, vanished on 10 April 1974 while hitchhiking from the Nottingham suburb of Bramcote, where she had a part-time job as a nanny. Her skeleton was found in rural Leicestershire in December 1975. She had received several blows to the head from a large blunt instrument.
May 1974	Barbara Forrest	Birmingham	The body of Forrest, 20, was left in Pype Hayes Park after she had been raped and strangled following a night out on 27 May 1974. It was found there eight days later, on 4 June. A man who had been a colleague of Forrest's stood trial for her murder but was acquitted.
June 1974	Intaz Ali	Birmingham	An intruder gained entry to Ali's home in Alston Street, Ladywood, on 7 June 1974 by smashing a rear window and stabbed him multiple times in his bedroom. It was suggested at the 37-year-old caster's inquest that his backing away from an agreement to marry a 16-year-old girl may have been the motive for the crime.
June 1974	Frank Goodman	Finsbury Park, London	62-year-old Goodman, a shopkeeper, was battered to death at a confectionery shop in Rock Street, Finsbury Park, on 13 June 1974. Serial killer Patrick Mackay was charged with this murder and four others, but Goodman's case was one of two left to lie on file at the ensuing trial.
August 1974	Gary Shields	Tynemouth, Tyne and Wear	Six-year-old Shields was sexually assaulted and suffocated to death after he went out to play football close to his home on 3 August 1974. His body was found nearby in reeds on the bank of the River Tyne the next day. A man confessed to killing Shields and then retracted his statement; his mental state was described as unstable. He was found guilty of manslaughter on the grounds of diminished responsibility, but his conviction was quashed in 1976 after a second man confessed. The second confession was made in 1975 by Kenneth Woodhouse, who was already serving time in jail for offences against children. Despite this, no charges were ever brought against him in relation to Shields's death.
August 1974	Norfolk headless body	Cockley Cley, Norfolk	A 19-year-old tractor driver found a woman's headless body in undergrowth at Cockley Cley, near Swaffham, on 27 August 1974. It was tied up, clothed in a pink Marks & Spencer nightdress and covered by a brown plastic National Cash Register dustsheet, and had been dumped two to three weeks previously. The woman was believed to have been aged 20 to 30. Police have suggested that the woman could have been an escort known as "The Duchess" who worked in Great Yarmouth before disappearing one day. A full DNA profile has been obtained from the woman's remains, so a possible family member could have their DNA compared with hers in order to confirm or rule out relatedness.
August 1974	Kevin Olsson	Blackpool, Lancashire	18-year-old Olsson was knifed in the heart at Bloomfield Road Stadium when a fracas started on the terraces of the football arena during a match between Blackpool and Bolton Wanderers on 24 August 1974. A 14-year-old boy was found not guilty of murder or manslaughter the following January.
September 1974	Tom Hewitt	Attacked in Bury, died in hospital in Salford (both in Greater Manchester)	30-year-old Hewitt was hit across the head with an iron bar at the garage workshop he owned in Bright Street, Bury, on 7 September 1974. A police officer whose father had lost a court case to Hewitt over a minor collision between their vehicles was investigated by colleagues as a suspect in the murder, but he did not become aware of this until years after retiring.
September 1974	Brenda McAuley	Brighton, East Sussex	42-year-old Glyndwr Collins and 27-year-old Brenda McAuley were a couple who sustained stab wounds and other injuries in a flat above an antiques shop in Kensington Place, Brighton, on the night of 23/24 September 1974. The flat was then torched, and it was smoke inhalation that killed McAuley as opposed to any of her previous injuries. The owner of the shop was charged with two counts of murder after his van was pulled over and cannabis found inside it in August 1990. During a trial in 1991, he claimed that he intervened to stop Collins attacking McAuley before having his face slashed and being pushed down the stairs by him, causing him to pass out. He further claimed that he heard a Scottish man fighting with Collins when he awoke, and left before the fire began. The jury found him guilty of Collins's manslaughter but cleared him of any involvement in McAuley's death.
September 1974	Billy Moseley	London	Moseley, a 36-year-old underworld figure, disappeared on 26 September 1974, and parts of his body were washed up from or found in the River Thames the following month. In June 1977, after a trial during which the prosecution alleged that he was killed for having an affair with another criminal's wife, two men were jailed for both Moseley's murder and that of Micky Cornwall, who died in the summer of 1975. Moseley's defrosting head was discovered in a public toilet in Islington in July 1977. Continuing to protest their innocence, one of the jailed men was released in 1997 and the other in 2000, but their murder convictions stood until the Court of Appeal overturned them in 2002.
October 1974	Josephine Backshall	Near Bishop's Stortford, Hertfordshire	39-year-old Backshall disappeared on 29 October 1974 after leaving her house in Maldon, Essex, to meet a man who had promised her some work in nearby Witham. Her body was found three days later in countryside approximately 35 miles from Maldon; she had been strangled but not sexually assaulted. The man whom Backshall had set out to meet had apparently given his name as Peter.
December 1974	Sarah Rodmell	Hackney, London	92-year-old Rodmell had head injuries when she was found murdered in the porch of the house where she had a flat. Serial killer Patrick Mackay was suspected but never admitted to being her assailant.

== 1975 ==
Year	Victim(s)	Location of body or bodies	Notes
February 1975	Ivy Davies	Westcliff-on-Sea, Essex	48-year-old Davies was battered to death with a steel bar at her home in Holland Road, Westcliff-on-Sea, on 3 or 4 February 1975. A 68-year-old neighbour was arrested in November 2006 after police recovered a bloodstained carpet from his loft following a tip-off, but the arrest did not lead to him being charged. Another suspect is a man said to have visited Davies's café in late 1974 or early 1975 – a man purporting to be a doctor but in reality an escapee from a psychiatric hospital, according to a woman who worked at the café in Westcliff when Davies ran it.
March 1975	Elsie Clayden	Linslade, Bedfordshire	Clayden, a 75-year-old widow living on Church Road in Linslade, was stabbed and battered at her home on 17 March 1975. Despite not finding any evidence that anything had been stolen, detectives were convinced nonetheless that she had been slain because she had interrupted an intruder with theft as their motive for breaking in. Dry-cleaners based in the area were asked by police to keep an eye out for clothing that looked as if it might be stained with blood.
1975	Eve Stratford, Lynne Weedon	London	21-year-old Stratford was killed on 18 March 1975. The Bunny Girl, who worked at the Playboy Club in Park Lane, had her throat cut between eight and 12 times. She had been tied up too and was found by her boyfriend in the bedroom of their flat in Lyndhurst Drive, Leyton, London. In 2007, police revealed that a link had been found between Stratford's murder and that of 16-year-old Weedon. Weedon had been taking a shortcut home through an alleyway in Hounslow six months after Stratford's death when she was hit on the head with a blunt object before being thrown over a fence into the grounds of an electricity substation and raped. She died in hospital a week later. Both murders featured on the BBC programme Crimewatch in September 2007, where it was said that they were sexually motivated and, thanks to new DNA techniques, were now known to have had the same culprit.
April 1975	Thomas Bradford Wilson	Pimlico, London	62-year-old Wilson was found dead at his flat in Alderney Street, Pimlico, in April 1975. He had been battered. Police linked Wilson's murder to five others, including the February 1970 slaying of Albert Cox (also described in this list), but two of these were later solved.
June 1975	John Wortley	Sheffield	On 5 June 1975, 67-year-old Wortley was battered to death with a fire extinguisher and £50–70 stolen from the kiosk at the car park where he worked as an attendant. Police have never managed to trace a man he was seen talking to five minutes before his body was discovered.
June 1975	David Williams	Stout Point, South Wales	48-year-old Williams, a civil service executive officer from Swansea, was found dead at the bottom of cliffs near the town of Llantwit Major on 30 June 1975.
July 1975	Renee McGowan	Bradford, West Yorkshire	McGowan, 55, was strangled in her flat on the top floor of a tower block on 22 or 23 July. Although drawers and cupboards in the flat were open when her fiancé discovered her body, nothing appeared to have been stolen from the property. Detectives suspected that the killer might belong to the Bradford Phoenix Society, a club to help divorced and separated people find new partners and to which McGowan herself had belonged, and so decided to compare with the fingerprints of its members some unidentified fingerprints that had been found in the flat. No match was made, however.
August 1975	Helen Bailey	Great Barr, Birmingham	The eight-year-old schoolgirl was last seen when she left her home in Great Barr to play outside at 3:30 p.m. on 10 August 1975. Her body was found the following morning in woodland at Booths Farm, close to her home. She had cuts to her throat and the inquest found that her death could have been the result of an "accident or practical joke gone wrong". Bailey's death was re-examined in 2014, with a pathologist stating that it was a "clear case of homicide". The verdict of the original inquest was overturned in 2018 and a new inquest was held in 2019, which ruled that she had been unlawfully killed. An imprisoned man reportedly confessed to Bailey's murder in 1979 and is still the only suspect. He was back in prison by mid-May 2019, but the Crown Prosecution Service has decided not to prosecute him over her death.
August 1975	Thomas Wilkinson	Glasgow	73-year-old Wilkinson lived alone in a ground-floor flat and kept himself to himself. He was last seen alive during the afternoon of 14 August 1975 and found battered to death in the sitting room of the property in Elmvale Street, Springburn, on 15 August.
August/September 1975	Micky Cornwall	Hatfield, Hertfordshire	Cornwall, a 37-year-old bank robber who had been friends with Billy Moseley (murdered in September 1974), disappeared towards the end of August 1975 and was found shot dead in a shallow grave in woodland near the outskirts of Hatfield on 7 September. At the trial of two men accused of murdering them, it was alleged that the decision to kill Cornwall had been taken because he was keen to find out who had killed Moseley so he could avenge him. The jury convicted the defendants of both murders, but in 2002 their convictions were quashed. Moseley and Cornwall's deaths now seem unlikely to be connected.
November 1975	Margaret Lightfoot	Epping Forest, Essex	48-year-old Lightfoot's naked body was found in Epping Forest the day after she failed to return home from taking her dog for a walk. She lived nearby, and her death was due to strangulation.
November 1975	Maud Cock	Effingham, Surrey	78-year-old Cock was beaten around the head with a weapon that was most likely a hammer. Her body was found in the kitchen of her cottage (which the culprit did not force entry to) on 27 November 1975, and a wedding and an engagement ring that belonged to the widowed victim were missing. Cock's attacker was suspected to have struck again following the similar murder of 43-year-old Khatoon Teja in New Malden in February 1976.
December 1975	Hugh Watson	Llanrwst, Conwy County	77-year-old Watson was attacked within a short time of leaving the Pen-y-Bryn Hotel in Llanrwst at about 9:30 p.m. on 9 December 1975. The recluse lived in a cowshed off Station Road, and his body was found in a hay barn close to his home after the barn was set alight. Watson died from asphyxia and was stabbed, possibly with a pitchfork.

== 1976 ==
Year	Victim(s)	Location of body or bodies	Notes
January 1976	Esther Soper	Plymouth, Devon	The body of 52-year-old Soper, a grandmother and widow, was found wrapped in her curtains in her home on Trematon Terrace, Mutley, Plymouth, on New Year's Day 1976. She had been bludgeoned with a cider bottle and strangled with her tights. Soper had been trying to sell the house and a mysterious man who may have been an estate agent had called round in the days before her death. The case was reviewed in 1997 using DNA testing, but only Soper's DNA was found from the scene.
January 1976	Andrew Smith	Leeds	52-year-old Smith was bludgeoned to death in Hunslet Road, Leeds, on 29 January 1976.
February 1976	Khatoon Teja	New Malden, London	43-year-old housewife Khatoon Teja was found blugeoned to death at her home in New Malden, South West London, on 4 February 1976. Police suspected that Teja was her attacker's second victim following the murder of 78-year-old Maud Cock at her home in Effingham, Surrey, in November 1975.
February 1976	Helen Hooper	Body not found	31-year-old Hooper disappeared from the Hertfordshire village of Standon on 13 February 1976. Her husband, whom she intended to leave for another man, was arrested and charged with her murder, but the case was thrown out at the magistrates' court, despite small amounts of blood having been found on a knife and on shoes in the cottage they had shared.
February 1976	Maureen Mulcahy	Port Talbot, South Wales	Mulcahy, 22, was last seen at the Green Meadow pub in Aberavon on the night of 21 February 1976. A dog walker found her body the following morning on waste ground close by; she had been strangled. Three teenagers – Sandra Newton, Geraldine Hughes and Pauline Floyd – had been murdered in the area in 1973 by the "Saturday Night Strangler", a serial killer posthumously identified as Joe Kappen when DNA tests were carried out almost 30 years later. Detectives believe Mulcahy could have been a fourth victim, but no conclusive evidence has been unearthed.
February 1976	Robert Jones	Liverpool	Jones, a 73-year-old artist, was one of three victims (all adult males) of a man who went on a knife rampage in Liverpool on 27 February 1976, but the only one who was injured fatally. Also the oldest of the three, Jones was stabbed outside his flat in Huskisson Street at about 10:30 p.m.
February 1976	Avis West	Northampton	81-year-old West was found battered to death at her house in Northampton at the end of February 1976. Police looked into whether the killing was connected to an alleged incident on 29 February involving a gun-toting hitchhiker with a Southern Irish accent ordering a man to drive him to Liverpool.
March 1976	Jack Wood	Pangbourne, Berkshire	Bookmaker Wood, 73, was murdered during a robbery at his betting shop and home on 3 March 1976. He was bound, gagged, then bludgeoned.
March 1976	William "Tank" McGuinness	Glasgow	46-year-old McGuinness, an underworld figure said to have had many enemies, was repeatedly kicked in the head on 12 March 1976 and died of his injuries on 25 March. John Winning, who was later himself murdered, was acquitted on 24 August after the court heard that bloodstains on McGuinness's clothing were not examined scientifically. McGuinness was suspected of being involved in the 1969 murder of a woman from Ayr.
March 1976	David Cross	Dartford, Kent	Cross, a 38-year-old guard working for Securicor, was shot on the evening of 27 March 1976 after three cars forced the van he was in to come to a halt on a slip road on the outskirts of Dartford. Over £100,000 was stolen. A trial the following spring saw four men found not guilty of the killing but one of them sentenced to 12 years in prison for being the getaway driver.
April 1976	Stanley Taylor	Attacked in Wembley, London, died in hospital	Taylor, 66, was kicked and robbed of a bag of money belonging to the Wembley and District Mutual Loan Society as he took the bag to deposit it in a bank's night safe on 14 April 1976. Four youths were acquitted in December.
May 1976	Pawlo Bublyczenko	Rochdale, Greater Manchester	60-year-old Bublyczenko, a grocer originally from Ukraine, was found battered to death behind his store in Oldham Road, Rochdale, on 17 May 1976. No evidence of forced entry, a struggle or theft was found at the property, however.
July 1976	Joan Mashek	Nottingham	48-year-old Mashek was beaten to death in her bedsit on Douglas Road in Lenton – probably with her own guitar – at some point between 10 and 13 July 1976. Although detectives were never able to put a name to anyone who they thought would have wished her harm, two people nevertheless came to be focused on in the investigation: a tall young man who shared her interest in classical music and ballet, and a young man she was seen with near County Hall in West Bridgford. There was an arrest over Mashek's murder in 1990.
July 1976	Enrico Sidoli	Hampstead, London	15-year-old Sidoli died at Hampstead's Royal Free Hospital on 19 July 1976 from brain damage caused by cardiac arrest, having been admitted 11 days earlier after being assaulted and held under the water in an outdoor swimming pool on Parliament Hill, Hampstead Heath. The incident was said to have been preceded by an argument between him and three older boys.
August 1976	Susan Donoghue	Bristol	Donoghue, a 44-year-old night nurse, was battered with a truncheon and sexually assaulted whilst in bed in her flat in Bristol's Sneyd Park area on 5 August 1976. A tobacco tin, a pair of gloves and the murder weapon were left behind, but none of these items nor anything else led to the perpetrator being caught. Nevertheless, because his semen was also recovered from the scene, advances in technology meant that detectives had a full DNA profile of him by the 40th anniversary of the attack.
August 1976	Allan Flisher	Attacked in Ashford, died in hospital in Canterbury (both in Kent)	Railway porter Flisher, 30, was found at a telephone kiosk on Jemmett Road, Ashford, in the early hours of Saturday 7 August 1976 after staggering to the kiosk to call for help. He had had a knife thrust into his abdomen about 200 yards away following a night out.
August 1976	Douglas Jones	Birmingham	58-year-old Jones was found dead in his flat on the 14th floor of a tower block on 18 August 1976. The tower block was on Birchfield Road in Perry Barr, and the cause of death was strangulation or blows to the head. A neighbour of the victim told his inquest that she heard two people fighting there two nights before his body was found.
September 1976	Francis Jegou	Maidstone, Kent	68-year-old Jegou, a former special constable, was fatally knifed in Brenchley Gardens, a park in Maidstone, on 12 September 1976. Michael Stone, convicted in 1998 of murdering two members of a family and attempting to murder a third as they walked along a country lane in Kent in July 1996, has been suspected by police of being the culprit in Jegou's murder, too.
October 1976	Patricia Black	Body not found	22-year-old Black, a factory worker from Saltcoats in North Ayrshire, was last seen as she waited for a bus in Eglinton Street, Irvine, during the afternoon of 9 October 1976. A youth in a blue denim suit was reportedly seen running from the direction of the nearby River Irvine towards the end of that afternoon, and a few weeks later, Black's handbag – with stones inside to keep it weighted down – was recovered from the same river. Police were "certain" that she had been murdered, according to an article in a newspaper published in December 1978.
October 1976	Jane Bigwood	Deptford, London	Bigwood, an art student aged 20, was knifed to death at her flat in Speedwell House, Deptford, on 21 October 1976. A man was convicted of her murder, but the conviction was overturned in December 1983 after further analysis of hairs found in her hand revealed that they were not his. The cleared man, a squatter in the same block of flats at the time of the slaying, was the owner of the murder weapon when the crime was committed but claimed that fellow squatters had access to it as well.
October 1976	Raymond Wharton	Birmingham	The 47-year-old doorman was shot at the New Gary Owen Club in the early hours of Sunday 24 October 1976 by a hooded man who seemed to be firing indiscriminately. The club was on Wordsworth Road in Small Heath, and it was speculated that the gunman was someone with a grudge against the establishment. Three men were acquitted in August 1977.

== 1977 ==
Year	Victim(s)	Location of body or bodies	Notes
January 1977	Annie Walsh	Hulme, Manchester	Walsh, 51, was discovered beaten to death with a lampstand in her sixth-floor flat on 31 January 1977. A man was convicted of the offence later in the year and he remained in prison for it until 2002, when, because it had been divulged that police officers had extracted a confession from him by assaulting and severely interrogating him, the Court of Appeal found his conviction to be unsafe.
March 1977	Barbara Ann Young	Doncaster, South Yorkshire	28-year-old Young, a prostitute and mother-of-two, was severely beaten in an alleyway in Doncaster on 22 March 1977 and died later from a haemorrhage caused by a fractured skull.
April 1977	Debra Schlesinger	Leeds	18-year-old Schlesinger was stabbed in the heart outside her home on 21 April 1977 after a night out with friends. West Yorkshire Police announced in 2002 that they were ready to charge "Yorkshire Ripper" Peter Sutcliffe, but as he was subsequently issued with a whole-life tariff for his convictions from 1981, no further action was taken.
June 1977	Joy Sweatman	Coulsdon, London	Sweatman, a 25-year-old mother of two young children, died at her suburban home when someone beat her with a hammer on 1 June 1977. Her two-year-old daughter was also attacked but survived, despite being unconscious in hospital for four days. A witness saw a man outside the house wipe a hammer on his coat before leaving in a white Austin Maxi saloon. He was never traced. The apparent lack of forced entry caused police to deduce that Sweatman probably knew the assailant.
June 1977	Thomas Morris	Attacked in Castle Vale, Birmingham, died in hospital in Sutton Coldfield	80-year-old Morris, a retired bicycle maker, was beaten with a spanner at his flat in Farnborough Road, Castle Vale, Birmingham, on 8 June 1977. A provider of the meals on wheels service found him with head, facial and knee injuries at the address, and he died on 14 June. Police thought the perpetrator was not a stranger to the victim.
August 1977	Rachel Levine	Salford, Greater Manchester	74-year-old Levine was found trussed up and lifeless at her home in Moor Street, Salford, following her death sometime after 10:00 a.m. the previous day (4 August 1977). Money had been taken from a safe and a strongbox despite the keys to them being two of nearly a thousand in the house.
August 1977	Dennis Oakley	Birmingham	54-year-old Oakley, a local butcher, was assaulted as he and his ex-wife, whom he was planning to remarry, left an Indian restaurant in Digbeth, Birmingham, at night on 27 August 1977. He was punched to the ground by one of two men after admonishing them for swearing in her presence and died about four hours later.
September 1977	Elizabeth Parravincina	Isleworth, London	On 9 September 1977, 27-year-old Parravincina was battered to death near her parents' home while on a route to the property that may have differed considerably from the route she normally took. Her death has been informally linked to Peter Sutcliffe, who it is believed was possibly staying in London, specifically Alperton, at the time.
October 1977	Brenda Evans	Poulton, Cheshire	Evans, 17, was murdered on 7 October 1977 while on her lunch break from Poulton post office and general stores. She had walked to her aunt and uncle's house to have lunch and failed to return to work. Evans's body was found down a manhole; she had been strangled with her own tights. Her fiancé, who had been cutting hedges close by that day, was questioned for 27 hours but not charged.
October 1977	Carol Wilkinson	Bradford, West Yorkshire	20-year-old Wilkinson was partially stripped, sexually assaulted and battered with a large stone in Woodhall Road, Bradford, as she walked to her workplace, a bakery in nearby Gain Lane, on 10 October 1977. She died at Bradford Royal Infirmary when her life support machine was switched off two days later. Peter Sutcliffe committed a frenzied attack on the body of one of his confirmed victims earlier on the day of the attack on Wilkinson, which was investigated as a possible "Yorkshire Ripper" attack before Anthony Steel, a man with learning difficulties, was suspected of the crime. Steel spent 20 years in prison for Wilkinson's murder and had his conviction quashed at the Court of Appeal in 2003.

== 1978 ==
Year	Victim(s)	Location of body or bodies	Notes
January 1978	Said Hammami	Mayfair, London	36-year-old Hammami, Britain's chief representative of the Palestine Liberation Organization, was shot dead in his basement office in Green Street, Mayfair, on 4 January 1978. Hammami wished for Palestine to coexist peacefully with Israel and had spoken out against terrorism, and a group headed by a Palestinian objecting to his moderate stance was suspected to have been behind his death.
January 1978	Maria Lister	Kegworth, Leicestershire	89-year-old Lister was found dead in her house on Packington Hill, Kegworth, on 11 January 1978. She had sustained several axe blows to the head between 8:00 a.m. and 9:00 a.m. that day, and the short-handled weapon was still at the scene.
January 1978	Beryl Culverwell	Bath, Somerset	52-year-old Culverwell, a welfare worker, was found dead in the garage of her home in Widcombe Hill, Bath, on 13 January 1978. She had been stabbed 21 times after being bludgeoned with a shotgun. Her body was tied with twine, although there were no signs of a violent struggle. The telephone wires in the house were cut. A motive for Culverwell's murder has never been clearly determined.
February 1978	Leslie Guntrip	Winsford, Cheshire	A bread delivery man found 72-year-old Guntrip battered to death at the victim's farmhouse near Winsford on 15 February 1978. A shotgun was missing from the farmhouse but nothing else.
March 1978	Donald Miller	Glasgow	58-year-old Miller, a former welder, was last seen alive on 10 March 1978 and found stabbed to death in his flat in Crichton Street, Springburn, on 20 March. Police at first thought that the property might have been used as a brothel and later disclosed that the deceased was homosexual.
March 1978	John Connors	Neath, South Wales	Connors' home help discovered the 85-year-old retired dentist's battered body in his house on Lewis Road on 31 March 1978. A suspect was spotted running from the house and being driven away in a white car the day before the discovery. He was about 6 feet (1.8 m) tall, had dark hair, and appeared to be between the ages of 30 and 40.
May 1978	Asha Bostan	Mendip Hills, Somerset	22-year-old Bostan, a trainee financial adviser and part-time model from Westbury-on-Trym in Bristol, went missing after a row with her Japanese boyfriend in a hotel in her city. The boyfriend, who promptly returned to Japan and committed suicide there in 1985 by jumping from a balcony of a tower block, was thought by a former detective superintendent to have killed her in the hotel on 3 May 1978, but no charges resulted from the police investigation triggered by her disappearance. Bostan's body remained undiscovered until 1992.
May 1978	Bill Simpson	Birmingham	45-year-old Simpson was a mechanic and his body was found burning inside his locked garage in Small Heath on 12 May 1978 after he had been shot there. He had been fined earlier in 1978 for possession of three stolen blank MOT certificates following the smashing of a racket involving about 300 such certificates, but no proof was uncovered that his murder was connected to his part in that racket.
June 1978	Michael Page	Orpington, Kent	Page, an 18-year-old bank clerk at NatWest in the Elephant and Castle, suffered six deep stab wounds and was robbed of his wallet (which contained his driving licence, a £50 cheque card and a railway season ticket) as he walked home on 4 June 1978, having attended a party with friends at Crofton Hall in Orpington. A passing motorist saw him lying on the pavement not far from Avalon Road (where he lived) at around 3:42 a.m.
August 1978	Genette Tate	Body not found	Although her body has never been found, Devon and Cornwall Police are treating 13-year-old Tate's disappearance as murder. Tate disappeared while delivering newspapers in Aylesbeare, Devon, on 19 August 1978. Serial killer Robert Black came to be considered the main suspect, but the evidence to support his involvement in her murder was not strong enough to charge him with it before his death in prison in 2016.
August 1978	Miriam Culine	West Cornforth, County Durham	33-year-old Culine's burnt body was discovered in a car at a garage and allotment site in West Cornforth on 22 August 1978. A former extramarital partner faced a trial at which his alleged reason for killing the candyfloss seller was her desire for the two of them to run away together (it was said that he was in love with another woman by that stage), but he was cleared of murder and manslaughter. He claimed that she was killed by her husband and his foreman after the husband found out about her infidelity.
September 1978	Georgi Markov	London	Assisted by the KGB, agents of the Bulgarian secret police, the Darzhavna Sigurnost, made two failed attempts to kill Markov before a third attempt succeeded. On 7 September 1978, 49-year-old Markov parked his car close to Waterloo Bridge – a bridge spanning the River Thames – and was waiting at a nearby bus stop when he was jabbed in the leg and had a tiny poison pellet fired or injected into him by a man holding an umbrella. The man apologized, hurried across the street and got into a taxi. Markov later said that the man spoke with a foreign accent. The event is known as the Umbrella Murder, with the assassin said to have been Francesco Gullino, code-named "Piccadilly".
September 1978	Carl Bridgewater	Yew Tree Farm, Kinver, Staffordshire	13-year-old Bridgewater was shot in the head at close range when he disturbed burglars while delivering a newspaper to a house on 19 September 1978. The Bridgewater Four were convicted in 1979 but acquitted in 1997.
October 1978	Nimraj Bibi	Oldham, Greater Manchester	39-year-old Bibi was struck once with a blunt instrument and died at her home in Waterloo Street, Oldham, on 4 October 1978. Her 21-month-old son was in a nearby cot when her body was found and likely witnessed the attack.
October 1978	Margaret Frame	Brighton, East Sussex	The 34-year-old mother-of-one disappeared on 12 October 1978 and was found dead 10 days later in a shallow grave in Stanmer Park. She had been hit over the head, stabbed in the back and raped. No one was charged with Frame's murder, but the father of Russell Bishop, a local man responsible for the nearby Babes in the Wood Murders in Brighton's Wild Park in 1986, was arrested in relation to it.
November 1978	Gary Wilson	Deptford, London	The body of 14-year-old Wilson was found in the yard of a derelict shop in Deptford in November 1978. He had been stabbed, strangled and sexually assaulted. A man was jailed for Wilson's murder in 1979 but released in 1995 after having his conviction ruled unsafe.
December 1978	Walter Taylor	Scunthorpe, Lincolnshire	Taylor, 17, was found dead on the Jubilee Playing Fields in Ashby shortly before Christmas 1978. He had been attacked with a piece of wood.
December 1978	George Cunningham	Coatbridge, North Lanarkshire	Cunningham, a 35-year-old rent collector for a local council, was murdered in the car park of an Asda superstore in Coatbridge on 29 December 1978. He was with a young man at a bus stop when he was last seen alive, and this companion was not traced despite a photofit of him being issued.

== 1979 ==
Year	Victim(s)	Location of body or bodies	Notes
January 1979	Lynda Farrow	Woodford Green, London	Pregnant Farrow, a 31-year-old mother-of-two, had her throat slashed in her home in Whitehall Road, Woodford Green, on 19 January 1979. It is believed that she either ran into her home to answer her ringing phone, leaving the door open behind her, or knew her attacker and let him in willingly. Farrow's body was found by her two daughters. The only clues to the killer are a set of footprints in the snow outside the house and a white car seen leaving there at around 2:30 p.m. Events leading up to and following Farrow's murder were reconstructed on the BBC's Crimewatch in January 2009. As of May of that year, police did not have a suspect's DNA profile, but links have been suggested between this case and the murders of Eve Stratford and Lynne Weedon.
February 1979	Sultan Mahmood	Bradford, West Yorkshire	Mahmood was a 31-year-old taxi driver, and it was believed by police that he was killed by members of a van-smuggling gang so they could resell his van in Pakistan. In 1983, a man already in jail for a different crime was put on trial for Mahmood's murder, but the trial collapsed after it was disclosed that the two fellow prisoners he supposedly came clean to had good reason to believe they would benefit from testifying against him. (Ahead of the hearing, one of the two men was told his charges would be wiped if he did so, the other that he would be given bail.) The case was reopened in 1994 when police received fresh information, but no breakthrough followed.
February 1979	Harold Day	Batley, West Yorkshire	73-year-old Day, a retired refuse foreman, was murdered on 18 February 1979. He died from asphyxia but also suffered a beating, and there was a plaited leather bullwhip around his neck when a fellow resident of Beaumont Court (a complex for the elderly in Batley) found him deceased at his flat there later on that date.
February 1979	Joe Gallagher and Frieda Hunter	Hyde, Greater Manchester	Gallagher and Hunter were a young couple bludgeoned to death in the bedroom of their home on Hallbottom Street, Hyde. They had last been seen on Saturday 24 February, when 30-year-old Gallagher, a taxi driver, picked 20-year-old Hunter up from her evening shift as a barmaid at the Queens Hotel in Hyde town centre. This was four days before they were found dead. Both victims had been known to use cannabis (in Gallagher's case apparently for medicinal reasons, to ease pain experienced as a result of operations on a facial disfigurement present since birth) and Gallagher was said to have supplied it too, but no drug-related or other motive for the double murder has been established. The killer or killers appeared to have broken into the house through the rear kitchen window, and the bodies of the pair were discovered after a colleague of Gallagher's had become concerned about his whereabouts. A wage packet and a purse were empty and the couple had been battered with a hammer while in bed together, suggesting a late night or early morning break-in.
March 1979	Resham Kaur Dhillon	Willenhall, West Midlands	Dhillon, 48, was found strangled in her bedroom at her house in Fisher Street, Willenhall, on 5 March 1979. Although a motive for her murder was not clear, it was believed that cash and gold were stolen. Anonymous letters received after Dhillon's death suggested a lead, but the case remains unsolved.
March 1979	Carol Lannen	Dundee	Lannen, a part-time prostitute aged 18, was seen getting into a man's red estate car near Dundee city centre sometime after nightfall on 20 March 1979. Her naked body was discovered in Templeton Woods the next day, and the cause of death was asphyxiation. Similarities between the cases have led to speculation that Lannen's murder is linked to that of Elizabeth McCabe in 1980.
March 1979	Henry Newman	Ilford, London	Park keeper Newman, 56, a father-of-three, was beaten to death with a metal crutch in a hut in Valentines Park, Ilford, on 22 March 1979. Police disclosed soon after his murder came to their attention that his £53 wage packet was missing. A male was prosecuted for the murder and then found not guilty.
April 1979	Gordon Snowdon	Attacked in Sutton Bridge, Lincolnshire; died in hospital in King's Lynn, Norfolk	At around 2:00 a.m. on 17 April 1979 (the day after Easter Monday), 60-year-old Snowdon, a petrol pump attendant at Sutton Bridge Motors, located on Bridge Road near Crosskeys Bridge, was found lying beside his kiosk with severe head injuries. A cash till had been stolen. Snowdon later died in hospital from his injuries. Part of the investigation centred on trying to trace a Citroën 2CV seen on the garage forecourt shortly before the murder. The cold case remains one of Lincolnshire Police's few unsolved murders. In the late 1990s, British serial contract killer John "Bruce" Childs from east London, convicted of six killings in the 1970s, confessed to five more murders from his jail cell, claiming that the fifth victim was Snowdon. Childs said he had killed Snowdon with a cosh because he was afraid he would be recognised after dumping another murder victim's car in the nearby River Nene. Childs claimed that six months earlier, he and associate Henry (Harry) "Big H" Mackenney had called at the filling station after murdering Ronald Andrews and dumping his car in the River Nene. Fearing that Snowdon would remember the two strangers after the car was recovered, Childs went back to secure his silence. He said: "I battered him to death with a cosh in his office and took the till to make it look like robbery. He was an old boy, and when I look back I'm sorry. But in those days I was ruthless about eliminating risks. It may sound silly, but I'm telling this now because I think that man might have relatives and I would like them to know the truth." However, Lincolnshire Police have confirmed that nobody has ever been charged in relation to the murder.
April 1979	Sean McGann	Northampton	15-year-old McGann visited his grandparents' home on 17 April 1979 and left between 5:30 and 6:00 p.m. to walk to a local funfair. He was found dead in an alleyway the next day, having been strangled, and investigators could not establish whether he had made it to the fair. A letter received by McGann's family in 1991 purported to contain important information about his killer but has not helped to progress the case.
April 1979	Robert Exon	Liverpool	42-year-old Exon died after he was found stabbed on the landing of the 11th floor of Entwistle Heights in Liverpool on the night of 17–18 April 1979. A man charged with murder was acquitted at his trial when a prosecutor announced that no further evidence was being offered. The prosecution's decision was influenced by a key witness's admission that she only heard a voice and saw someone's back.
April 1979	Michael Baker	Leeds	28-year-old Baker died from head injuries at his place of employment (a mill in The Calls, Leeds) on 18 April 1979. A trespasser or trespassers attacked him after he arrived earlier than usual because there was a production backlog due to machine failure, and an attempt was made to open a safe on the premises.
April 1979	Blair Peach	Southall, London	The 33-year-old special education teacher was involved in a mass demonstration against a National Front meeting in Southall on 23 April 1979. When police charged at protestors, he was struck on the head and died from his injuries. A report made public in 2010 concluded that Peach was "almost certainly" killed by a riot police officer; in the same year the Metropolitan Police commissioner, Sir Paul Stephenson, apologised to Peach's family.
May 1979	John Daniel	Birmingham	45-year-old Daniel, a garage mechanic who had been trying to persuade friends to lend him money, was killed on the evening of 1 May 1979 before being found in his car on wasteland in Balsall Heath, Birmingham, by a police officer on patrol. He had been shot in the head by an unknown offender after telling people he had an appointment to keep.
July 1979	Suzanne Lawrence	Body not found	14-year-old Lawrence vanished from Harold Hill, London, on 28 July 1979. Although her body has not been found, a murder inquiry was launched nonetheless, and in 1994 she was officially investigated by police as a possible victim of serial killer Robert Black. Black regularly travelled along the A12, a road near where Lawrence disappeared, when he worked as a delivery driver. Lawrence's case has also been speculatively linked to Peter Tobin.
July 1979	Eddie Cotogno	Dumbarton	Cotogno was bludgeoned to death with a hammer or a similar object on 30 July 1979. A police officer on the beat that day had his attention drawn to the 63-year-old pornographer's flat by a fire there – a fire presumed to have been started in order to get rid of forensic evidence. Investigators questioned Angus Sinclair, an armed robber who had recently fallen out with Cotogno and would eventually be exposed as a serial killer. Backed up by his wife, Sinclair gave them an alibi that they found satisfactory, but years later she claimed that he had not been with her at the time of Cotogno's death after all.
August 1979	Wendy Jenkins	Bristol	31-year-old Jenkins was seen talking to a smartly dressed man at the junction of Drummond Road and City Road in St Pauls, Bristol, at daybreak or thereabouts on 27 August 1979 (a Bank Holiday Monday). A labourer found her mutilated body on a building site about 27 hours later. The Yorkshire Ripper was officially a suspect in the early stages of the police investigation into the prostitute's murder.
August 1979	Mary Carpenter	Leigh-on-Sea, Essex	65-year-old Carpenter's barking dog drew people's attention to her body at Belfairs Nature Reserve, Leigh-on-Sea, on 27 August 1979. The victim was a local woman, and her body had multiple stab wounds. A man went to prison for murder in 1980 but had his conviction overturned in 1982, with Lord Justice Donaldson (one of the appeal judges) noting that there were issues concerning how the trial judge handled alibi evidence. Donaldson did also advise, however, that because of the appellant's schizophrenia, he should be found a place in a secure hospital rather than set free.
September 1979	Alison Morris	Ramsey, Essex	25-year-old Morris, a postgraduate of London's Royal Holloway College, was stabbed repeatedly in the chest on the evening of 1 September 1979. Her body was found at the side of a country footpath by her father, who had gone out to search for her because she had not returned home after leaving to go for a walk in the woods.
October 1979	John (a.k.a. Jack) Armstrong	Stalling Down, near Cowbridge, South Wales	On 5 October 1979, 58-year-old Armstrong set off in his taxi to pick up someone calling himself Williams and asking to be taken from Fairwater in Cardiff to Cowbridge. Armstrong's body was found three days later, 11 miles (18 km) from where the blood-spattered taxi had been found abandoned at 6:00 p.m. on the day of that journey. His skull had been crushed by three blows to the head and he had been robbed of about £20 in takings.
October 1979	Bedgebury Forest Woman	Bedgebury Forest, Kent	A mystery woman aged between 30 and 35 was found in Bedgebury Forest on 23 October 1979, having been beaten to death. The discovery led to a murder enquiry, but she was never identified. It was thought she had come from Eastern Europe and had had one child. She was white, about 5 feet 1 inch (1.55 m) tall, and of thin build, with brown eyes and dark brown shoulder-length straight hair. When found, she was wearing black shoes, a floral dress, and a black polo neck jumper. Police re-investigated the case in 1999, and in May 2000 a man from East Sussex stood trial for her murder but was acquitted after a four-week trial.
December 1979	Sally Shepherd	Peckham, London	The 24-year-old restaurant manager from Peckham was clubbed, stamped on and sexually assaulted shortly after stepping off a bus during the early hours of 1 December 1979. Three rootless hairs from the scene of the crime are likely to be from the person who took her life, but forensic scientists will refrain from testing them until technology has advanced enough to make the chances of obtaining a full DNA profile from them higher.
December 1979	Peter Hennessey	Kensington, London	39-year-old Hennessey, landlord of the Dog & Bell pub in Deptford, was stabbed on 12 December 1979 while attending a boxing club dinner at Kensington's Royal Garden Hotel. Two men aged 23 and 49 were charged with his murder and then acquitted, and in November 1982, the older of those two men – Patrick O'Nione – himself became the victim of a murder that remains unsolved.

== See also ==
- List of bombings during the Troubles
- List of people who disappeared mysteriously
- The Disappeared (Northern Ireland)
