= Patrick Mackay =

British serial killer (born 1952)

- Born: Patrick David Mackay; 25 September 1952 (age 74); Middlesex, England
- Other names: David Groves; The Psychopath; The Devil's Disciple
- Height: 6 ft 2 in (1.88 m)
- Conviction: Manslaughter (3 counts) (1975)
- Penalty: Life imprisonment, 20-years minimum term

Details
- Victims: 3–11
- Span of crimes: February 1974 – March 1975
- Country: United Kingdom
- Date apprehended: March 1975

David Groves, better known by his birth name Patrick David Mackay (born 25 September 1952), is believed to be one of the United Kingdom's most prolific serial killers. He was convicted of three counts of manslaughter and two additional cases that were left to lie on file. Detectives stated that Mackay confessed in remand to the murders of six more people across London, Essex and Kent between 1973 and 1975. All of these alleged victims were found to match existing unsolved murders.

Diagnosed as a psychopath at the age of 15, Mackay has been repeatedly denied parole since 1995 on the basis that he is considered too dangerous for release, although since 2017 he has been incarcerated in open prison conditions with day release provisions. In 2020, authorities launched fresh inquiries into Mackay's suspected murders, but they were unable to find sufficient evidence. Former Dartford MP Gareth Johnson has repeatedly voiced his concerns over his potential release. In July 2022, it was revealed that Mackay's case had been once again referred to the Parole Board.

== Early life ==
Patrick Mackay was born at London's Park Royal Hospital (now known as Central Middlesex Hospital) on 25 September 1952. His parents were Harold Mackay, a Scottish accountant, and Marion Mackay, a woman of Creole descent from British Guiana. His two younger sisters were born later in 1954 and 1957. Mackay grew up with his parents and sisters in Dartford, Kent.

As a child, Mackay was a frequent victim of physical abuse by his father. He performed poorly at school, bullied his younger classmates and frequently had tantrums. A classmate would later describe Mackay as "like a little terrorist" who physically attacked other pupils. He also engaged in cruelty to animals and often tore the wings off birds.

When Mackay was ten years old, his father died from a heart attack on his way to work, the result of complications of alcoholism and a weak heart. His last words to his son were, "Remember to be good." Mackay was supposedly unable to come to terms with the loss of his father, telling people he was still alive and keeping a photograph of him on his person. He did not go to the funeral in Scotland based on his mother's recommendation.

Later, Mackay assumed the role of "father figure" within the family, beating his mother and sisters. His mother eventually moved the family to Gravesend, but their lives did not improve and police were called to the home as frequently as four times a week. Mackay also attempted to kill a boy younger than himself, and later said he would have succeeded had he not been restrained.

At age 15, Mackay was diagnosed as a psychopath by a psychiatrist, Leonard Carr, who predicted he would grow up to become a "cold, psychopathic killer." He was removed from his family home on 18 occasions between the ages of 12 and 22 and put into various specialist schools, institutions and prisons. One of his teachers at a specialist school described Mackay as "a potential murderer of women." In October 1968, Mackay was committed to Moss Side Hospital, Liverpool, from which he was released in 1972.

== Crimes in adulthood ==
As he entered adulthood, Mackay developed a fascination with Nazism, calling himself "Franklin Bollvolt the First" and filling his flat with Nazi memorabilia. Now living in London, he frequently abused drugs and alcohol.

=== London theft and murder spree ===
Following Mackay's release in 1972, the affluent London areas of Chelsea and Knightsbridge experienced a marked rise in muggings, robberies and handbag snatchings. The attacks specifically targeted elderly women, whom the unidentified attacker would befriend and whose homes he would gain access to before committing their crimes. It would later be found that Mackay was behind these crimes.

On 14 February 1974, 84-year-old Isabella Griffith was physically assaulted, strangled and stabbed in her home in Chelsea by Mackay. Police were unable to identify Mackay as the perpetrator and the muggings and petty thefts continued in the area. On 10 March 1975, elderly Adele Price was also killed in her Chelsea home by Mackay, who had entered her property asking for a glass of water. Price's granddaughter was coming home at the time and, without knowing, passed the killer as he left the premises after attacking the woman. Police were concerned the crime spree and the killings of the two women were linked.

=== Killing of Father Crean ===
Some miles away on 21 March 1975, Father Anthony Crean was brutally killed in his home in Shorne, Kent, near the home of Mackay's mother. Crean had been attacked with an axe in a frenzied attack, with the weapon being found at the scene. Mackay had been seen in the area by multiple witnesses.

An investigating police officer remembered an incident that had occurred some months earlier involving Mackay, who had befriended Crean only to break into his home and steal a cheque for £30. Although Crean tried to persuade police not to do so, Mackay was arrested and prosecuted at the time. He was subsequently ordered to pay compensation but never did. The incident caused a rift between Mackay and Crean, and the former had returned to London. After the incident was recalled by the officer, police arrested Mackay, who quickly admitted to killing Crean.

=== Links to previous crimes discovered ===
After his arrest for the murder of Crean, Mackay's fingerprints were taken, which were found to match those found at the Price murder scene. Jewellery and silver fountain pens were found in Mackay's home which had come from robberies he had committed in Chelsea and Belgravia. Mackay took detectives to an area of Clapham where he said he had thrown a knife he used in his killings. The Metropolitan Police began to investigate Mackay, who was found to have committed many other unsolved murders and crimes in the London area.

=== Confessions ===
At first, Mackay confessed to police of murdering Griffiths, Price and Crean. But when he was on remand at HMP Brixton, detectives got information from other prisoners that he had killed six more people. Most of these murders were unknown to the interviewing officers. Detectives checked his descriptions of some of the killings and found they indeed matched details of unsolved murders that had occurred in and around London.

The first of the unsolved murders was of 17-year-old German au pair Heidi Mnilk, murdered on 9 July 1973. Witnesses said the killer had stabbed her on a train before opening the door and throwing her out near Catford. The second unsolved murder was of Mary Hynes, murdered in Kentish Town on 20 July 1973. The third was a drunken homeless man, who Mackay killed by throwing him off a bridge into the River Thames in January 1974. The fourth and fifth murders were of 57-year-old Stephanie Britton and her 4-year-old grandson, Christopher Martin, on 12 January 1974. The sixth murder was of Frank Goodman on 13 June 1974, who had been beaten to death with a metal bar over a pack of cigarettes. Mackay's landlords recognised the bar from their house. Mackay also allegedly confessed to the murder of 92-year-old Sarah Rodmell in her flat in Hackney on 23 December 1974, saying that he had nailed the back door shut and put her stockings in her mouth, and that "killing her was as easy as washing my socks." The eighth murder was of 48-year old café owner Ivy Davies in Southend in February 1975; the killer had beaten her with a tent peg. Mackay confessed that he knew of the shop and considered robbing her, but when he was driven to view her café and nearby home, he did not recognise them.

Investigators concluded that Mackay had been the perpetrator of the mugging and theft spree, crimes which were previously unsolved.

Mackay denied his confessions to all but four of the murders (Griffiths, Price, Crean and the homeless man). This meant that there was insufficient evidence to charge him for more than five murders. Police were unable to identify the homeless victim.

=== Trial ===
At his trial in November 1975, Mackay was convicted of the manslaughter of Adele Price, Isabella Griffith and Father Anthony Crean after pleading guilty on the grounds of diminished responsibility. Further evidence of his involvement in the murder of Frank Goodman was insufficient and he was not convicted of the murders of Goodman or Hynes and the cases were left to lie on file. He was sentenced to life imprisonment with a minimum term of 20 years.

Mackay's defence team had pleaded insanity, but medical experts instead concluded that he was a psychopath (a personality disorder and not a mental disorder).

== Subsequent developments ==
In 1989, he appeared briefly in a BBC documentary Forty Minutes episode titled "Danger Men". Mackay spent time in Hull Prison, where a special unit was set up to deal with one of the "most dangerous and difficult prisoners" in the country. As Mackay was asked if he was a psychopath, he replied: "There is never any suggestion in my mind that I was ever a psychopath if somebody used that criteria".

Mackay's minimum tariff was 20 years, meaning that he became eligible for release in 1995. He has been repeatedly denied full release by the parole board. In 2017 he was permitted to move to an open prison with day release provisions. In 2019 Dartford MP Gareth Johnson voiced concern at the potential release of Mackay, raising the issue in Parliament and writing to the Secretary of State for Justice.

In 2020 Mackay was again considered for release. The hearing of the parole board was postponed amidst a fresh investigation into Mackay's involvement in the murders of which he was suspected. In May 2021 the parole board announced he would not be eligible for release but could remain in open prison conditions.

In 2022, it was revealed that Mackay's case had once again been referred to the parole board. The son of Ivy Davies said that he was outraged by the announcement but was unable to give an account to the parole board of the impact of Mackay's crimes as Mackay was not convicted of her murder. Commenting, he stated: "Everyone knows he did more. He hasn’t shown any remorse. But there's not a lot I can do about it."

Mackay has been imprisoned for 50 years as of 2025.

== In popular culture ==
=== Documentaries ===
Mackay's crimes have been featured in a number of documentaries:

- In 2002, an ITV documentary titled London's Scariest Mysteries: Patrick Mackay documented his crimes.
- On 7 October 2012, a series 2 episode of Fred Dinenage's Murder Casebook series (alternatively titled Murders that Shook the Nation) covered Mackay's crimes. The episode was titled: Patrick Mackay: The Psychopath.
- On 20 August 2013, a series 5 episode of Born to Kill? documented Mackay's crimes. The episode was titled Patrick Mackay: The Devil's Disciple.
- On 1 January 2015, a series 1 episode of high-profile criminologist David Wilson's series First Kill/Last Kill focused on Mackay's crimes.
- On 1 February 2023, a documentary titled Confessions of a Psycho Killer was released on Amazon Prime.

=== Books ===
- In 1976 authors Tim Clark and John Penycate published a book on Mackay titled Psychopath: The Case of Patrick Mackay. It was published by Routledge.
- In 2019 a book on Mackay's murders and alleged murders was released by author John Lucas, titled Britain's Forgotten Serial Killer: The Terror of the Axeman. The book contributed to the rising concerns of Mackay's possible release.

== See also ==
- List of serial killers in the United Kingdom
- List of serial killers by number of victims
- John Cannan – murderer and suspected killer of Suzy Lamplugh, also eligible for parole in 2022 (denied, died in prison in 2024)
- Allan Grimson – another British killer suspected of killing dozens of victims who is now eligible for release
- Jordan Worth – high-profile UK female criminal released from prison in 2022 (abuser of Alex Skeel)
