= Killing of Helen Bailey =

1975 British child murder case

- Location: 52.5415°N 1.9104°W (approximate); Booths Farm, Great Barr, Birmingham, England
- Date: 10 August 1975
- Attack type: Strangulation and knife attack
- Deaths: 1
- Victim: Helen Bailey

In August 1975, the body of eight-year-old Helen Bailey was found in Great Barr, Birmingham, England. Her death was originally classified as being due to undetermined causes, potentially originating from an "accident or practical joke gone wrong" despite her body being found in a secluded area with her jugular vein severed. The original verdict into Bailey's death was overturned and replaced with one of unlawful killing in 2019.

Bailey's killer has not been identified, although several investigators believe the perpetrator to be a suspect who confessed in the late 1970s to having strangled then cut her throat, as well as divulging forensic details of the killing not revealed in the original 1976 inquest. Officially, the case of Bailey's death remains unsolved.

Contemporary media accounts dubbed Bailey "Little Girl Blue" as she was dressed entirely in blue at the time of her death.

== Background ==
Helen Bailey
- Bailey, c. 1975
- Born: Helen Louise Bailey; 5 March 1967; Birmingham, England
- Died: 10 August 1975 (aged 8); Great Barr, Birmingham
- Cause of death: Knife wound to jugular vein
- Body discovered: 11 August 1975; Booths Farm, Great Barr, Birmingham; 52.5415°N 1.9104°W (approximate)
- Other name: Little Girl Blue
- Education: Calshot Road Junior School, Birmingham

Helen Louise Bailey was born in Birmingham on 5 March 1967. She lived in Booths Farm Road, Great Barr, with her parents and older brother and was a pupil at Calshot Road Junior School. The family were close-knit, and Bailey has been described by her family as a "bubbly, chatty" and friendly young girl.

== 10 August 1975 ==
By August 1975, the Bailey family had plans to holiday in Cornwall in the middle of the month. On the afternoon of 10 August, Bailey returned home from playing outdoors with her clothes, hands and face in a dirty state; she failed to inform her parents how she had become so grubby and took her Sunday afternoon bath slightly early before leaving the family home to play with her brother and his friends at approximately 4:30 p.m. She had changed into blue shorts, a blue blouse, blue socks and blue plimsolls.

=== Disappearance ===
The final verifiable sighting of Bailey occurred shortly after she left her home when she was observed playing with a skipping rope close to her home. Shortly after 5 p.m., Bailey's parents became concerned when their daughter failed to return home. After a brief, fruitless search of nearby streets and friends' houses, the Baileys reported their daughter missing to West Midlands Police at 5:30 p.m.

After initial standard procedures failed to locate Bailey, West Midlands Police immediately began a full-scale search for her; this full-scale search began at approximately 8:30 p.m. and involved house-to-house inquiries in addition to police searches of local terrain such as waste ground, and a sand and gravel quarry throughout the night of 10–11 August. The search for Bailey was assisted by numerous civilian volunteers, including Bailey's father, neighbours, and parents of her friends.

== Discovery ==
At approximately 6:30 a.m. on 11 August, following a ten-hour police-coordinated search, a search party which included Bailey's father discovered her fully clothed body. She was lying on her back, with a knife wound to her throat; her body lay in a section of scrubland (Note: Sources variously describe the location of the discovery of Bailey's body as "woodland", "scrubland" or "waste ground". The area has since been landscaped and housing built on part of it.) on the former Booths Farm, close to the M6 motorway and on the opposite side of the motorway to her home. This location was known to local children as the "Magic Wood", and Bailey's mother had forbidden her daughter to play there. (Note: The "Magic Wood" was a popular play area for local children. Contemporary news reports indicate local children re-enacted fairytales at the location.)

=== Post-mortem ===
The post-mortem conducted by Home Office pathologist Frederick Griffiths on 11 August established that Bailey had received a single knife wound to the throat which, although described as shallow, had perforated her jugular vein. No signs of a struggle were found upon her body nor within the vicinity where her body was discovered, and Griffiths noted no evident signs of bruising or other forms of pressure upon her neck. Bailey had not been subjected to any form of sexual assault.

=== Initial investigation ===
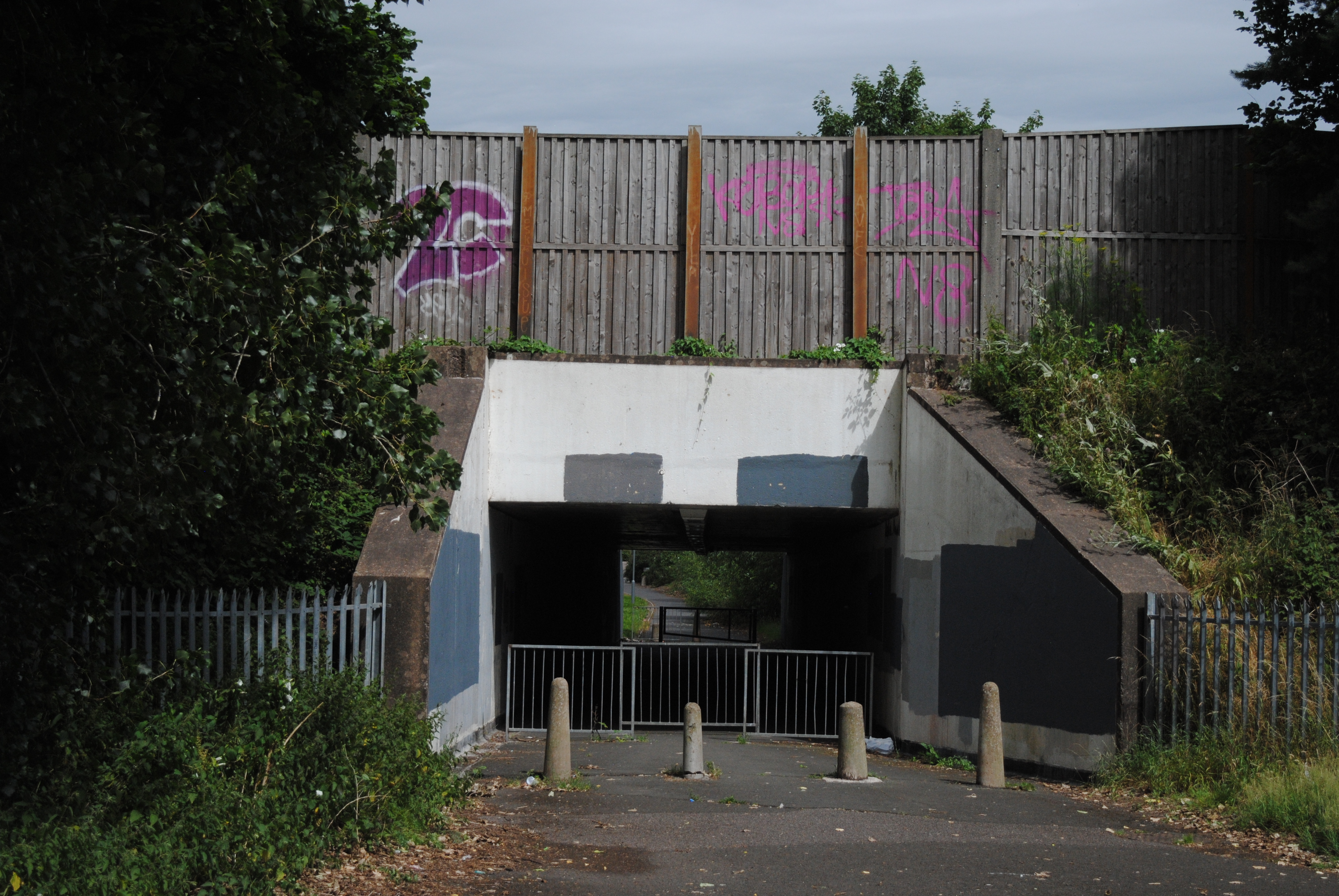
The underpass beneath the M6 motorway, looking towards Booths Farm, in 2020. Bailey is believed to have been seen walking beneath this underpass at 7:10 p.m. on 10 August.

West Midlands Police launched an intense investigation into Bailey's death; police investigations into her background, acquaintances, and her movements on the date of her death failed to identify either a motive for her death or the individual(s) responsible. In addition, police were unable to conclusively determine Bailey's movements in the hours immediately prior to her returning home in a markedly dirty state to take her afternoon bath, although they were able to establish a likely sighting of her walking alone through a pedestrian underpass beneath the M6 motorway at 7:10 p.m. (Note: The underpass was subsequently named "Forgers Walk". Its coordinates are: 52.542975°N 1.914309°W)

The circumstances surrounding Bailey's death and the relatively minimum force necessary to inflict the wound to her throat meant investigators were unable to discount the possibility a child or children were responsible for her death. Contemporary eyewitness accounts given to investigators revealed a "ginger-haired" young man had been seen loitering in the vicinity of the location of Bailey's body on the afternoon of her death; this individual had also been seen walking through the underpass at approximately the same time as Bailey, though not in her company. The description of this individual—described as being between 35 and 40 years old with bushy, ginger hair and wearing brown trousers and a lime shirt—closely matched the description of a suspect given to police days prior in relation to the sexual assault of a local underage girl. This individual was never traced.

== Initial inquest ==
The initial inquest into Bailey's death was held on 10 March 1976; the jury at this inquest heard testimony from Frederick Griffiths that the sole wound discovered upon her was a markedly shallow knife wound to her neck which may have been caused either accidentally or as an unintended result of a childish prank, with the latter being his preferred explanation. Griffiths further elaborated at this hearing he had performed numerous autopsies upon victims of murder who had sustained serious injuries to the neck and that, in his opinion, the circumstances of Bailey's death lacked "the hallmarks" of a homicidal attack. Resultingly, the jury returned an open verdict and the case ultimately became cold, although members of Bailey's family remained convinced she had been murdered.

== Cold case review ==
In 2012, West Midlands Police commenced a cold case review; this review saw Home Office pathologist Nathaniel Cary examine all original post-mortem documentation relating to the case and conclude her death had been a "clear case of homicide", adding the margins of the knife wound indicated Bailey had actually endured two cutting incisions to her throat. Cary further noted that petechiae evident upon the skin of Bailey's face, eyelids and forehead indicated she had also been manually strangled before receiving the fatal knife wounds to her throat and that, contrary to his predecessor's conclusions regarding the depths of the single incision wound, the force used to inflict these knife wounds to Bailey's neck had been sufficient to sever subcutaneous fat in addition to neck musculature.

Cary's revelations led Detective Chief Superintendent (DCI) Caroline Marsh to state investigators were "absolutely certain" Bailey was murdered rather than suffering death by misadventure.

=== Renewed witness appeal ===
In June 2017, a renewed appeal for witnesses was featured on the BBC's Crimewatch Roadshow. The programme also featured an unsuccessful appeal for her murderer or anyone with knowledge of his identity to come forward.

== Fresh inquest ==
In December 2018, Lord Justice Hickinbottom and Mrs Justice Whipple formally approved a request submitted before the High Court of Justice by senior coroner Louise Hunt that the original inquest verdict into Bailey's death be quashed and a new inquest into her death be held. Within this ruling, Hickinbottom and Whipple also noted that a suspect in Bailey's death had given three separate confessions to Bailey's murder in 1978 and 1979—each of which was "entirely consistent" with known facts pertaining to her death and containing forensic information not previously disclosed to the public but only uncovered in 2012. Within these accounts, the suspect had related how he had strangled Bailey before cutting her throat with a penknife upon noting she was still breathing. (Note: The accounts given to medical professionals by this suspect while a patient within a psychiatric unit remained unavailable to police until their 2012 cold case review into Bailey's death.) In addition, at the time of Bailey's death, this suspect had lived close to where her body was discovered.

=== Prime suspect ===
At a May 2019 pre-inquest review in which evidence was first publicly divulged Bailey had been strangled before her throat had been cut, the Detective Chief Superintendent leading the cold case investigation revealed that prison inmate John Sir was considered the prime and sole suspect in her death. Sir had been questioned intently in 1975 but had never been charged in relation to her death.

In 2014, Sir was arrested at prison and taken to Bloxwich police station. Over the course of two days, he did not admit to Bailey's murder. Investigators concluded, however, that he was responsible for her death following forensic developments regarding the circumstances preceding her death.

Sir had been in his late 20s and a resident of Tamworth at the time of Bailey's death; (Note: Contemporary news articles dating from July 2019 list Sir's age as 72.) his family home was near where Bailey's body was found. At the time of Bailey's death, he had been known as Kenneth Etchells but had since changed his name. He had been sentenced to life imprisonment in 1991 for the attempted murder of his own mother, whom he had severely injured with a hammer and who died of pneumonia nine months later. (Note: Sir was briefly released from prison in April 2019; he had been re-imprisoned by the following month.)

In July 2019, Sir lost a legal bid for his right to anonymity to remain enforced prior to his being ordered to testify at ensuing legal hearings into Bailey's death. Both due to concerns for his safety should he testify in person and the fact Bailey's family were to be present at the scheduled hearings, Sir was allowed to testify via video-link.

== July 2019 hearings ==
At the formal inquest into Bailey's death on 5 July 2019, Sir—represented by solicitor Spencer Stephens—admitted to being in the vicinity of her death on the date in question, but claimed his repeated admissions to psychiatric hospital staff of his culpability in murdering Bailey in the late 1970s were entirely fabricated and had been concocted to make himself "look interesting" to specialists at this facility and to ensure his admission to the premises following a suicide attempt; he also claimed to be unable to account for the fact his admissions into Bailey's death were entirely consistent with recently uncovered pathological evidence into her death, insisting his knowledge of the case was limited solely to "what [he had] heard or saw in the papers or whatever." Sir's inquest testimony lasted for over twenty-five minutes.

Pathologist Nathaniel Cary also appeared at the new inquest. Questioned as to the discrepancies between the original coroner's findings and those of the 2012 cold case review into Bailey's death, Cary testified as to his belief the original post-mortem examination would have misled Frederick Griffiths into believing the wound was a shallow one, which Griffiths had actually concluded may have been caused by a tree branch, and that Griffiths had also failed to note the clear signs of strangulation inflicted upon Bailey. Cary also testified Bailey was most likely lying on the ground and possibly unconscious at the time the fatal knife wound was inflicted to her neck.

We're very pleased today that the coroner has recorded a different verdict which properly reflects the way that Helen met her death. We are actively pursuing this investigation [...] and are very much hopeful of bringing an offender to justice

— West Midlands Police Detective Chief Superintendent Mark Payne reflecting upon the renewed inquest verdict into Bailey's death. July 2019.

== Unlawful killing verdict ==
The original verdict into Bailey's death was overturned and replaced with one of unlawful killing in July 2019. At these hearings, coroner Louise Hunt stated that prior to the inquest she had written to the Crown Prosecution Service (CPS), who had informed her they would only be willing to consider reopening the case into Bailey's death should sufficient new evidence be presented at the hearing.

Upon hearing the verdict of unlawful killing at this inquest, Hunt stated: "I will be writing to [the CPS] again with the outcome of this case and asking them to reconsider their decision." However, due to insufficient new evidence presented at the inquest, the CPS refused to prosecute Sir in relation to Bailey's murder, with a spokesman stating the "realistic prospect" of securing a conviction against Sir in light of the lack of any sufficient new evidence divulged at the hearings would be highly unlikely. Nonetheless, this spokesman did emphasize that, should "new evidence come to light", the CPS would review the developments accordingly.

== See also ==
- Lists of solved missing person cases
- List of unsolved murders in the United Kingdom (1970s)

== Cited works and further reading ==
- Benish, James (2024). Closed Eyes: Who's Killing Our Children. Codefore Publications. ISBN 978-0-982-42491-9.
- Billingham, Nick (2007). More Foul Deeds & Suspicious Deaths in Birmingham. Pen & Sword Books. ISBN 978-1-783-03738-4.
- Drake, Phillip (2024). Unsolved Murders of the UK: Cold Cases from 1951 to Present Day. Pen & Sword Books Limited. ISBN 978-1-399-03255-1.
- Greene, Karen Shalev; Alys, Llian (2016). Missing Persons: A Handbook of Research. Routledge. ISBN 978-1-409-46802-8.
- Hunt, Amber; Thompson, Emily G. (2020). Unsolved Murders. Dorling Kindersley Limited. ISBN 978-0-241-44961-5.
- Tedisco, James N.; Paludi, Michele (1996). Missing Children: A Psychological Approach to Understanding the Causes and Consequences of Stranger and Non-Stranger Abduction. State University of New York Press. ISBN 978-0-585-07649-2.
- Turton, Kevin (2019). Britain's Unsolved Murders. Pen & Sword Books. ISBN 978-1-526-72633-9.
- Wilkes, Roger (2011). The Mammoth Book of Unsolved Crimes. Hachette UK. ISBN 978-1-780-33373-1.
