= Murders of Eve Stratford and Lynne Weedon =

British murder victims

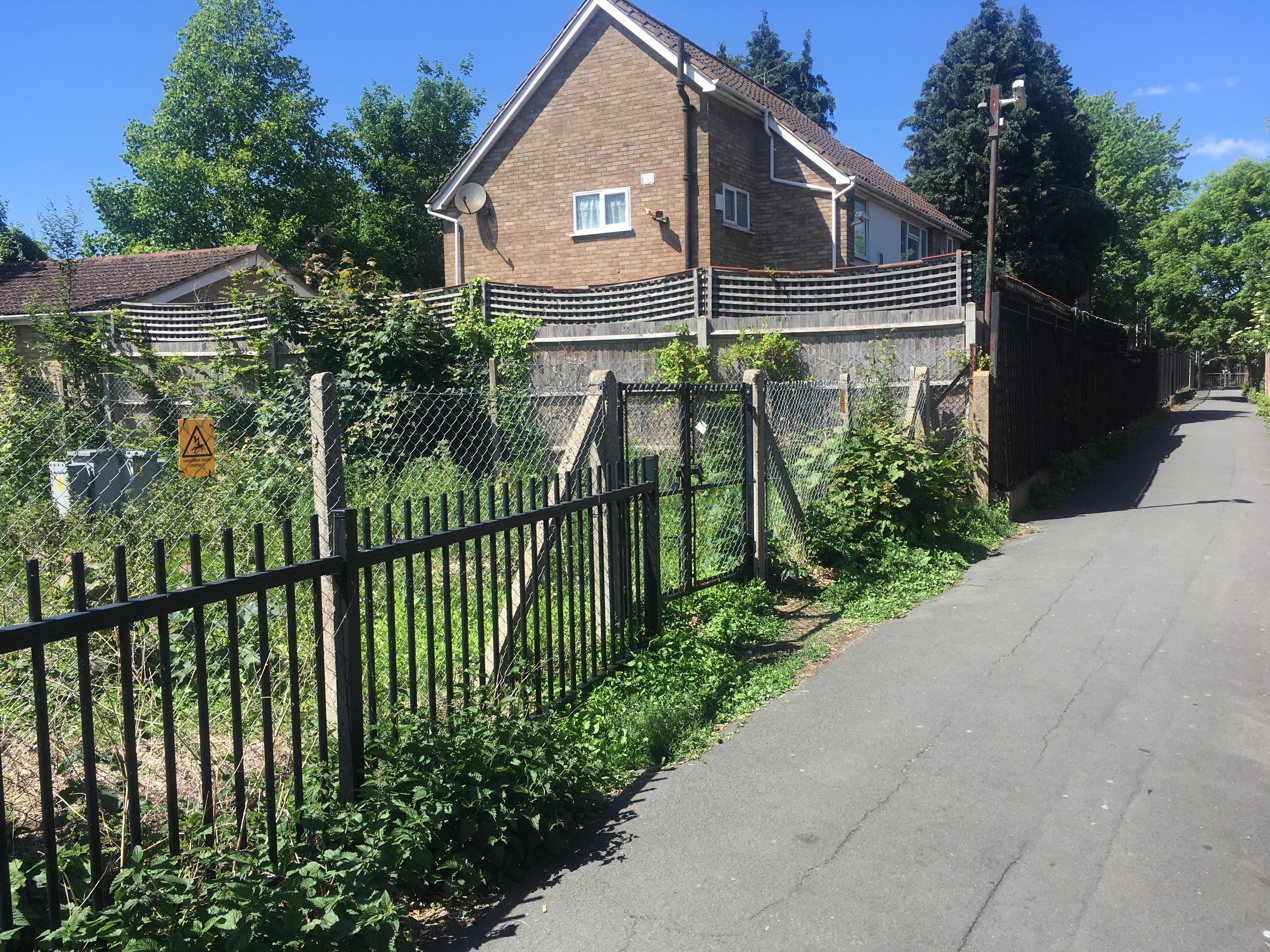
- The location where Weedon was attacked in the "Short Hedges'/'School Walk" alleyway (pictured in 2022).
- Location: Eve Stratford: 61a Lyndhurst Drive, Leyton, London; Lynne Weedon: School Walk, Hounslow, London
- Date: 18 March–10 September 1975
- Attack type: Murder; Sexual assault
- Deaths: 2
- Victims: Eve Stratford; Lynne Weedon
- Perpetrator: Unknown
- Motive: Sexual sadism

Locations
1 1975 Eve Stratford murder.
2 1975 Lynne Weedon murder.
3 1977 Elizabeth Parravincina murder.

The murders of Eve Stratford and Lynne Weedon, two young women from London, England, occurred in separate, sexually motivated attacks by the same unidentified individual during 1975. Stratford was a bunny girl, and Weedon, who had just left school, was killed almost six months later, on the other side of London. After Weedon's cold case was re-opened in 2004, new DNA techniques revealed that she and Stratford had been murdered by the same person. Stratford's case was re-opened in 2007, but neither case has been solved. A £40,000 reward for information leading to the killer remains on offer.

Stratford's and Weedon's murders have been linked to other cases, in particular, the murder of Elizabeth Parravincina in September 1977, which occurred only one mile (1.6 km) away from the site of the attack on Weedon and almost exactly two years to the day after. The murder occurred in almost identical circumstances, and police themselves linked the killings. The perpetrator is, therefore, likely to be an uncaught serial killer. (Note: A serial killer is most commonly defined as a person who kills three or more people for psychological gratification; reliable sources over the years agree.)

== Eve Stratford ==
Elizabeth Eve Stratford was born in Dortmund, West Germany on 28 December 1953 to Albert and Liza Stratford. Her mother was German, and met her father, an English medic in the Royal Army Medical Corps, in the 1940s. He was serving as part of the British Army of Occupation on the Rhine in the aftermath of the Second World War. As a youth, Stratford won three beauty contests in Germany. The family moved around the world during Stratford's childhood, eventually settling in Aldershot, Hampshire.

In 1972, she moved with her boyfriend Tony Priest, the lead singer of Onyx (later Vineyard), to Leyton, east London. Two other members of the band also shared the flat. At the time of her death, Stratford was a Playboy Club Bunny in Park Lane. She had started work at the club in 1973, recommended by a friend. She lived a glamorous lifestyle and regularly socialised with others, including famous figures such as Sid James and Eric Morecambe, and knew many other high-profile individuals. As a model she sometimes referred to herself as "Eva Von Bock" and was also known as "Bunny Ava".

In March 1975, only a few days before she was killed, Stratford appeared on the front cover of Mayfair magazine, an adult magazine for men, as "girl of the month". She was suspended for breach of contract by her club since she had posed for a rival publication. The magazine was said to be "on the top shelf of every newsagent in March that year". Police would later conclude that the magazine cover had likely enticed her killer.

== Murders ==
=== Stratford ===
Eve Stratford
- Stratford in 1975
- Born: 28 December 1953; Dortmund, West Germany
- Died: 18 March 1975 (aged 21); 61a Lyndhurst Drive, Leyton, London, England; 51.57232°N 0.0026°W
- Cause of death: Throat cut
- Other names: Eva Von Bock; Bunny Ava
- Occupation: Playboy Club Bunny
- Parents: Albert Stratford (father); Liza Stratford (mother)

On Tuesday 18 March 1975, Stratford was found dead by her partner at their flat at 61a Lyndhurst Drive, Leyton. Her throat had been cut between eight and twelve times from ear to ear, while her neck and face were extensively mutilated, with detectives stating it was one of the most horrific murder scenes they had ever seen.

She was found partially unclothed with a nylon stocking tied around one ankle, and her hands were bound with a scarf. She was dressed only in a flimsy pink bra and panties and a flimsy blue nylon negligee open at the front. There was a strong suggestion she had been sexually assaulted, and semen was found on vaginal swabs. There was no sign of forced entry to the property, nor were there any signs of a struggle. A peculiar cloying scent was left by her attacker in the room where she was found.

Police found that on the day of her death, Stratford had visited Camden to see her agent and then went to a promotions consultancy in Bayswater. As far as detectives could tell, she had made the journey home on her own and was not seen with anybody else. She began to travel home at 3:30 p.m. and walked from Leytonstone tube station to her flat, last being seen by a neighbour walking toward her residence while wearing a floppy hat and holding some dried flowers. At 4:30 p.m., the women living below her flat heard a male and female voice talking, apparently calmly, followed by a thud and then the sound of footsteps. It was 5:20 p.m. when her boyfriend returned to find her dead. Stratford's murder was featured prominently in the press, in part due to her "glamorous" occupation and public profile.

=== Weedon ===
Lynne Weedon
- Weedon in 1975
- Born: 11 November 1958; London, England
- Died: 10 September 1975 (aged 16)
- Cause of death: Blunt force trauma
- Body discovered: Short Hedges (now School Walk), Hounslow, London, England; 51.47784°N 0.36725°W

The killer struck again later that year. Sixteen-year-old Lynne Weedon was hit over the head with a blunt object and raped on 3 September 1975, six months after Stratford's murder and on the other side of London. That night she had gone out to celebrate her O-level results with friends at the Elm Tree pub on New Heston Road in Hounslow, near to where she lived in Lampton Road.

Weedon began to travel home at 11:00 p.m., parting company with her friends on the Great West Road before crossing over and continuing her journey home on her own through an alleyway named Short Hedges (now 'School Walk', it is used by pupils walking to the adjacent Lampton School). Weedon had previously vowed never to use the alleyway after dark as it was frequented by prowlers, but that night she took the shortcut. In this alleyway, at approximately 11:20 p.m., she was struck over the head with a heavy object similar to a piece of lead pipe, fracturing her skull. Her attacker then lifted her over gates and into the grounds of a power substation, before dragging her out of sight and raping her. She was discovered the next morning by the caretaker of the neighbouring school, Victor Voice and, despite her injuries, was still alive; she died a week later in hospital without regaining consciousness.

Around the time of the murder, a man out walking his dog had seen a white male walking down the alleyway. Other witnesses described seeing a man, believed to be the same individual, running across the Great West Road into the alleyway. It is believed that this man was Weedon's attacker.

=== Initial investigations ===
Police were convinced that the magazine piece Stratford had appeared in the same month she died had lured Stratford's sexually motivated killer to her. They believed that the killer had traced her address and then attacked her. That month's magazine featured naked photoshoots of her alongside an interview in which she concluded that she liked to be submissive sexually, stating:

If a man is truly a man and not effeminate in any way, he'll know how to handle me. I like to be dominated. Not whipped and tied up, or things like that. But just kept in my place. I get very bored with straight sex. I like playing little games with my lovers to turn us both on."

She further commented that she found it "quite easy to turn men on" and "I do tend to flirt and tease rather a lot, I just get a kick out of turning men on". Her colleagues reportedly were shocked at her "outspoken" comments about her sexual life. Police also noted that, although she had three housemates, she said in the article that she lived alone with her cat. Detectives believed she may have been spotted by her killer and followed home to her flat before being murdered. Stratford was said to have been upset about the Mayfair cover, believing it made her sound lesbian. Stratford was bisexual and stated in the article that she liked men and women.

The facts that there were no defence wounds and that no-one had heard any screams or shouts suggested Stratford knew her killer, but it was also considered that she could have been terrified enough to simply comply with the attacker's demands. The bouquet of flowers she was seen carrying home was found discarded in the hallway of the apartment ground-floor entrance and not up in her first-floor rooms, suggesting that she was confronted by her killer almost immediately after entering the house. It was also observed that the bouquet of dried flowers and grasses were similar to those Stratford had posed with in the Mayfair magazine cover.

Detectives considered the possibility that her killer was a secret lover she had invited round, but considered this unlikely, as she would have known that her boyfriend could have returned home at any time. However, there was also no sign of a forced entry. An alternative theory considered was that the attacker was a friend or acquaintance she may have let in.

Other bunny girls at Stratford's club were interviewed, and it emerged that some had received obscene phone calls in the lead up to the murder. One girl, Marilyn Looms, had received death threats following her own nude centrefold in Mayfair. Detectives found that Stratford had herself received a number of intrusive phone calls in the days leading up to her death, in which the caller had either hung up without speaking or had whispered obscenities over the line. It was also discovered that she had received three mysterious phone calls on the very day she died. Each time she had answered the phone, the caller said nothing and then cut the line dead.

Searches of nearby gardens, dustbins, and drains following Stratford's murder failed to find the murder weapon but did uncover a badly torn copy of the magazine which had featured Stratford days before her death (although other pornographic magazines were also found there). Two photofit pictures were released by detectives of two men seen in the vicinity of the murder site that day which officers wished to speak to. One was described as being in his late 30s or early 40s, of medium height with a peculiar limping gait and ruddy complexion. The other was about the same age but taller and with thick, black wavy hair. Nothing came of these photofit appeals.

Stratford had previously complained about a man who lurked near her house and followed her, but nothing was known of him other than her description of him as having a peculiarly strained and stiff walk. There were claims that an aggrieved Arab associate had tried to run Stratford down as she left her Park Lane club one night some months before her death, suggesting the man may have had a vendetta against her, but nothing came of this.

In October 1975, police in Liverpool found newspaper reports of Stratford's brutal killing smeared with lipstick in an empty bedsit. Also at the scene were magazine photos of the model, who appeared to have been stabbed with a dart. The landlord had discovered the items after cleaning up the flat after it was vacated by two male tenants. By 1976, all leads had been exhausted by the original Stratford investigative team and the murder inquiry was wound down. The murder weapon was never found.

== Cold case investigations ==
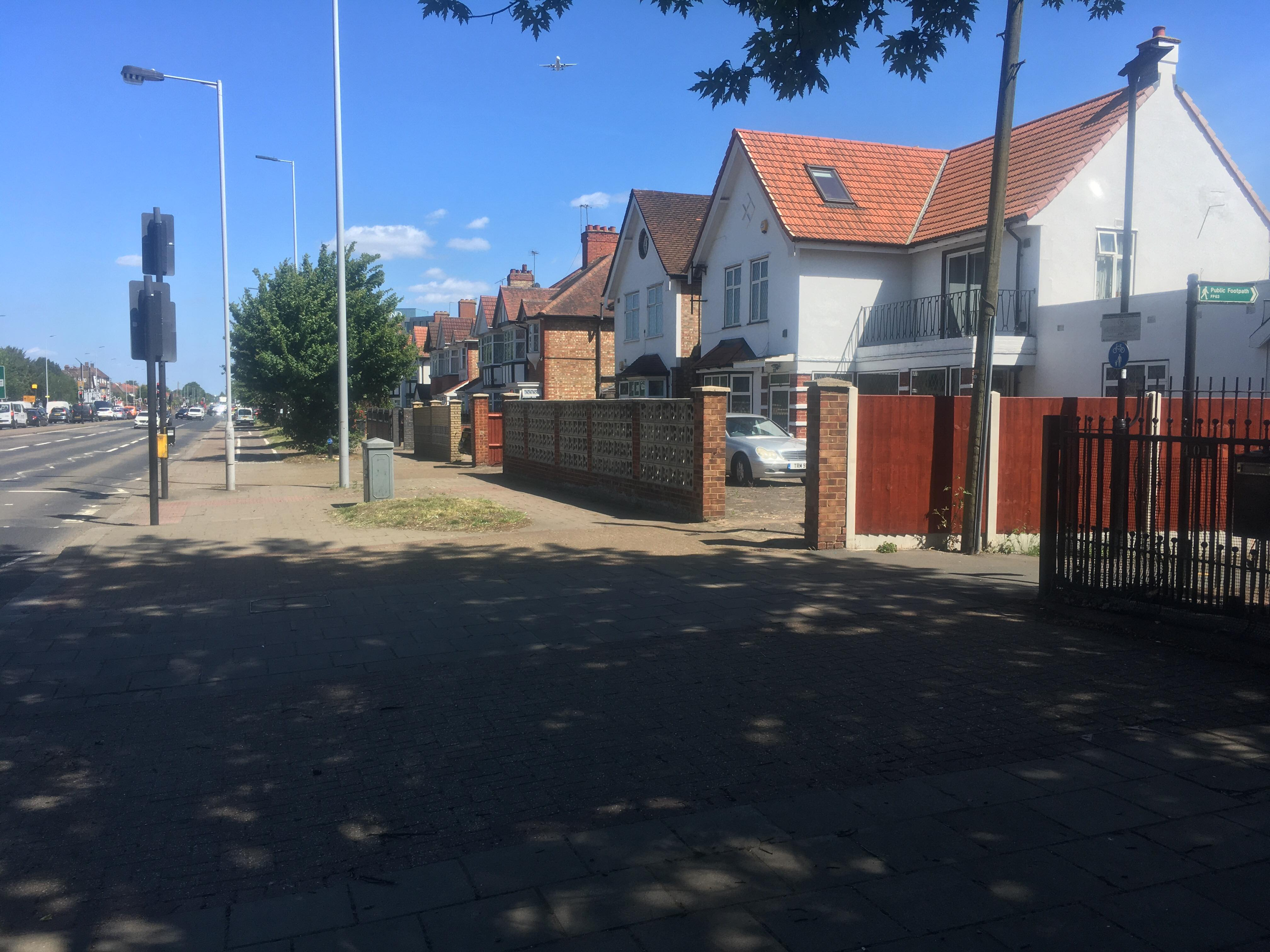
Entrance to the 'Short Hedges'/'School Walk' alleyway from the Great West Road. Weedon's killer was believed to have spotted the girl entering the alleyway and followed her into it, where he attacked her.

In 2004, the Weedon investigation was re-opened. In 2007, new DNA technology unexpectedly showed that the murders of Stratford and Weedon were committed by the same person. As a result of the link, Stratford's case was re-opened. Sixteen of the main suspects in the murders had their DNA taken, but none matched the killer's sample. Both cases were featured in September 2007 on the BBC Crimewatch programme, where DCI Andy Mortimer stated that "without a shadow of a doubt" both murders were sexually motivated. It was noted that the attacker had, on both occasions, taken the weapon to the scene before taking it away with him, clearly indicating that they were premeditated attacks for sexual motivation.

Mortimer stated that he was sure that the man seen going into the alleyway in which Weedon was murdered was her attacker, and investigators believed that the man had stalked her as she walked from the Great West Road to the alleyway. Mortimer said that it was very unlikely that the killer had only committed these two murders and never committed another crime ever again, stating that the attacker probably committed offences both before and after the attacks. Operation Stealth, the police operation which has been investigating unsolved murders since 2008, received funding to continue work until the end of 2011.

On 25 March 2015, police issued a fresh appeal to coincide with the 40th anniversary of the murder of Stratford. One month later, in April, the murders were again featured on Crimewatch, on which it was revealed that a new £40,000 reward was on offer for information leading to the capture of the killer. Detectives noted that it was possible that the killer could have committed crimes or gone to prison for other offences between the time of the murders and 1995, as it was only in this year that DNA began to be taken from individuals arrested for crimes. It was also stated that the killer would have had good knowledge of the 'Short Hedges' ('School Walk') alleyway in which Weedon was attacked and that he would have been a white male between the ages of 17 and 30 (between 63 and 77 in 2023). It was asserted that psychiatrists, probation officers, cellmates, or prison guards could hold the information needed to identify the killer, as he may have made an admission or disclosure to these people over the years regarding the murders. The lead detective also told The Guardian: "It's inconceivable the killer of Eve and Lynne has kept the perfect secret for 40 years. It's a heavy burden to carry and he must have let details slip over the years—maybe to a partner, a friend, even a cellmate—and I would appeal to anyone with information to contact us."

== Other linked cases ==
=== Murder of Elizabeth Parravincina ===
Elizabeth Parravincina
- Parravincina in 1977
- Born: 2 August 1950; Ealing, England
- Died: 9 September 1977 (age 27); Outside Parklands flats, Osterley Road, Osterley, London, England; 51.47986°N 0.34326°W
- Cause of death: Blunt force trauma
- Other names: Elizabeth Parravicini, Elizabeth Graham (maiden name)
- Occupation: Amateur actress
- Father: George Graham

In the early hours of 9 September 1977, almost two years to the day since the death of Lynne Weedon, 27-year-old Elizabeth Parravincina (also spelled Elizabeth Parravicini) was murdered only a mile away from the site of Weedon's attack. The murders occurred in similar circumstances, and it was immediately announced that the killings of Weedon and Parravincina could be linked. Just as in the case with Weedon, Parravincina had walked home late at night along the Great West Road before turning right into Osterley Road, where she was attacked.

Having walked past St Mary's Church and the playing fields of Isleworth Grammar School (now Isleworth and Syon School) Parravincina drew level with the driveway of the private Parkfield Housing Estate where she lived, when she was suddenly attacked from behind by a man who hit her with a blunt instrument, as in Weedon's killing. Parravincina's skull was likewise instantly fractured and the killer similarly dragged her body away from the street and into shrubbery. Although in Parravincina's case, there was no sign of sexual interference, detectives believed that Elizabeth's attacker had been disturbed and had fled before interfering with her body.

Similarly to Eve Stratford, Parravincina was blonde and described as "a very striking woman". In the aftermath of the murder, the Metropolitan Police themselves said that there may have been a link to Weedon's killing, stating: "There are similarities with the murder of Lynne Weedon which are being considered".

A large police hunt was launched in response to Parravincini's murder, and a photofit picture of a suspect was released, leading to more than 60 calls being made to police by the public. In January 1978 the lead detective, Detective Chief Superintendent Chris Draycott, said that there were "quite a few possibles which are being worked on at the moment".

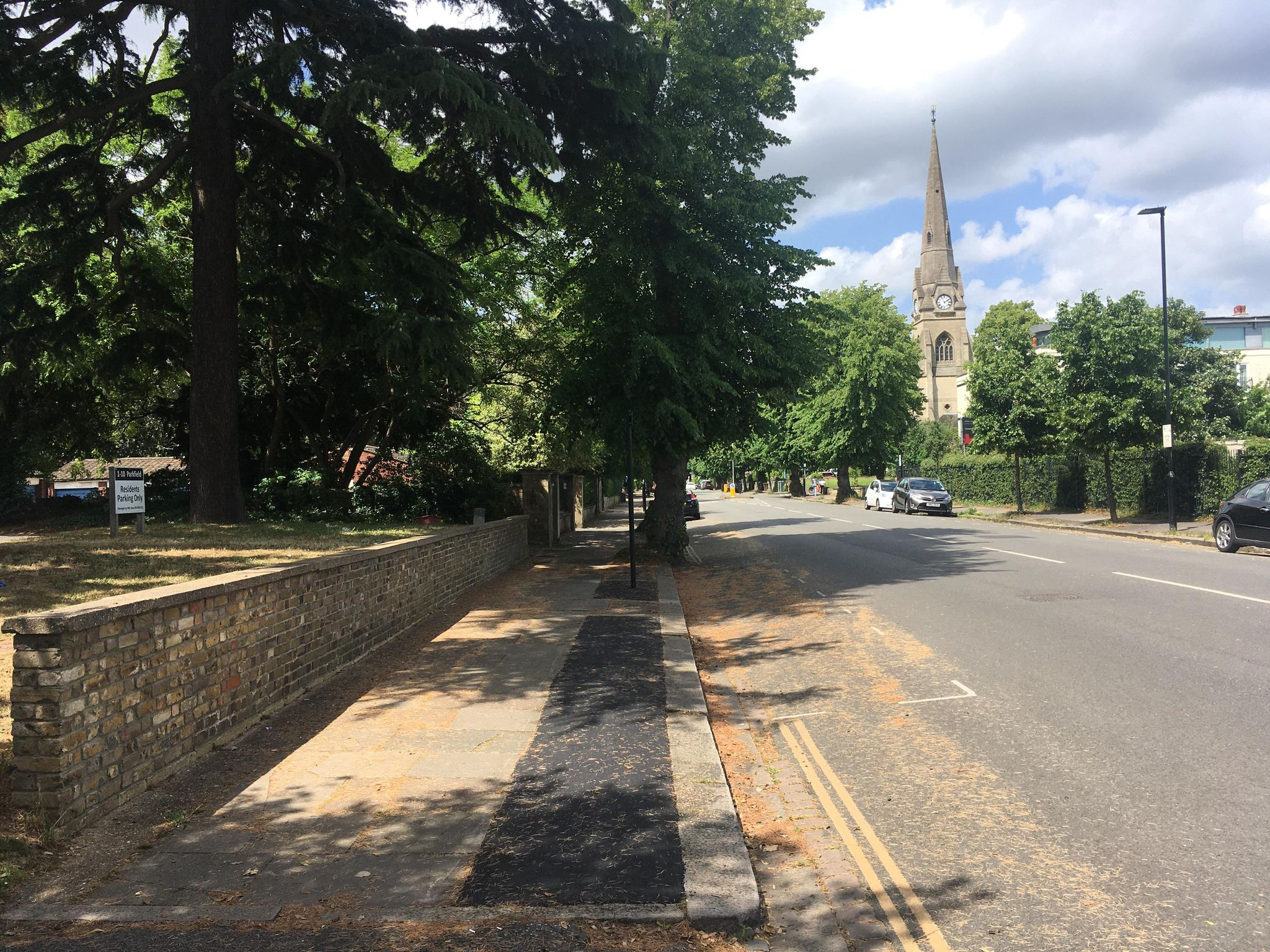
The site of Parravincina's murder. As Parravincina walked toward the Parklands flats where she lived (on the left of the image), she was suddenly struck from behind with a blunt instrument.

In 1983, it was revealed that detectives had interviewed a jailed policeman as part of an inquiry into the murders of three women, including Weedon and Parravincina. The policeman, Paul Thomas, had been jailed for five and a half years for sex crimes, and was said to have "led a secret life of kinky sex, terrorising schoolgirls". He reportedly prowled the streets in the area at night wearing a hood and dark clothes. He was also known to have harassed women with anonymous phone calls, as Stratford was in the weeks before she was killed. Thomas was interviewed after his arrest for the other crimes and was questioned routinely about the death of Elizabeth Parravincina. However, he was reported to have produced "a satisfactory alibi". In 2007, when the DNA link between Stratford's and Weedon's killings was discovered, it was reported that detectives expected DNA to also reveal a link to Parravincina's murder.

=== Murder of Patsy Morris ===
Locations of the murders of Weedon, Parravincina, and Morris in the London Borough of Hounslow

Links have also been suggested between Weedon and Parravincina's murders and that of Patsy Morris, another local schoolgirl who was killed less than 2.5 miles away from Weedon at Hounslow Heath in 1980. Immediately after Morris's killing, it was noted in the press that she had been the third girl to be murdered in the area in the last 5 years, following the murders of Weedon and Parravincina in 1975 and 1977, respectively. Morris, 14, had gone missing from the area on 16 June of that year, and two days later was found half-naked and face down in undergrowth on the Heath, with her clothing pushed upward over her body. This suggested a sexual motivation to the killing, as in Weedon's case, although there was in fact no sign of sexual assault or rape.

As well as the proximity to Weedon's attack five years previously and to other attacks on women in the area, such as that of Elizabeth Parravincina in 1977, Morris had been tied up in a similar fashion to Eve Stratford, who the murderer of Weedon was also known to have killed. A pair of tights with one leg missing was tied around her leg and wound upward until it knotted four times around her neck, acting as a ligature. Stratford had, like Morris, been found with her hands tied behind her back with the leg of one of her stockings, with the other leg similarly tied around her ankle. Soon after Morris was found dead, her father received a death threat by phone from an unidentified teenage boy. The call was from a local caller with a local-sounding voice.

In 2008, it was revealed that Morris had been the childhood girlfriend of west London serial killer Levi Bellfield, an Isleworth-born man who lived nearby at the time of the killing and who had just been convicted of two murders and an attempted murder in the area. These attacks had been committed between 2003 and 2004 in the vicinity of the Morris murder site. It was also reported that police were investigating a possible confession to the murder made by Bellfield, alleged to have been made to a cellmate while on remand. Bellfield would have been 12 years old at the time of Morris's murder, which occurred a year before he received his first conviction, for burglary, aged 13. He was known to have repeatedly played truant while at school and was known to often frequent Hounslow Heath when he should have been at school. He was known to have not attended school on the day of the murder of Morris. Former partners of Bellfield recounted that he had a hatred of blonde women and targeted them for attacks, and it was noted that Morris was herself blonde. Some claimed that Morris's death could have been the start of Bellfield's violent obsession with blondes.

After it was revealed that Bellfield was being investigated by police for his daughter's murder, Morris's father stated that he was certain that the teenage boy who had given him a death threat in a call at the time was Bellfield, saying: "He's a local man, which is why it could be him. And it's terrifying to think that someone of twelve or thirteen could have done it".

== Disproven links to other cases ==
=== Murder of Lynda Farrow ===
In 2005, before the DNA link between Stratford's and Weedon's murders was discovered, there was media speculation linking the murders of Stratford and Lynda Farrow, a 29-year-old mother of two who had her throat cut in her own home while heavily pregnant on 19 January 1979. A man who had been waiting outside Farrow's home discreetly followed her into the house after she came back from a shopping trip, before slitting her throat and quickly escaping out of the back door. Links were suggested between Stratford's and Farrow's cases because both had their throats cut and both had worked at West End nightspots. Farrow had worked at the International Sports Club in Mayfair, where boxing matches were held. Stratford and Farrow had lived 5 miles apart.

When the DNA link between Stratford's and Weedon's murders was revealed in 2007, it was reported that detectives believed that DNA could also prove a link to Farrow's killing. Police extracted a DNA profile of Farrow's killer and uploaded it onto the National DNA Database to check whether there was a link to Stratford's murder, but the tests showed that Stratford's and Farrow's murders were not linked, and that there was no match between the DNA found in Farrow's case to any other crime. This indicated that there was no evidence to connect the murders. The lead detective on the case, Rebecca Hamilton, confirmed the existence of forensic evidence in Farrow's case on Crimewatch in January 2009.

Despite this, in 2022 former Metropolitan Police detective Colin Sutton, who led the high-profile investigations into Levi Bellfield and Delroy Grant, claimed that Farrow's murder could be linked to Stratford's and Weedon's. Sutton had previously carried out a cold case review of the evidence in Farrow's case on behalf of the Met in 2002 (before the DNA evidence was discovered in the cases which showed they were not linked) and said he was struck by the similarities he saw. He said the cases of Stratford and Farrow were similar as both had their throat cut in their own home. Sutton's claims come despite the fact that Farrow and Stratford's murders were found not to be linked by DNA. His claims were promoted in advance of a book about the case he was due to publish with John Blake Publishing, titled The West End Girls. A documentary based on this book and promoting Sutton's claims was also due to be released in 2022, titled West End Girls: The Search for a Serial Killer.

== See also ==
- List of unsolved murders in the United Kingdom
- Chris Clark – a crime writer who claimed in Yorkshire Ripper: The Secret Murders that Stratford and Weedon were killed by Peter Sutcliffe (despite the DNA evidence)
- Murders of Jacqueline Ansell-Lamb and Barbara Mayo
- Colin Campbell – killer of two young women in sexually motivated attacks in west London in the early 80s
- Murders of Kate Bushell and Lyn Bryant – two other UK unsolved murders which police believe may be linked

UK cold cases where the offender's DNA is known:

- Murder of Deborah Linsley
- Murder of Lindsay Rimer
- Murder of Janet Brown
- Murder of Linda Cook
- Murder of Melanie Hall
- Batman rapist – subject to Britain's longest-running serial rape investigation

== Bibliography ==
- "Public help in murder hunt". Acton Gazette. 26 January 1978. p. 15.
- "1977: Goodbye to all that!". Acton Gazette. 5 January 1978. p. 16.
- "Eve Stratford Bunny Girl who was murdered at this house 61a Lynhurst Drive London..." Alarmy. Archived from the original on 13 November 2023.
- "Milly calls uncover 97 new leads". BBC News. 28 February 2008.
- "New funding for unsolved murder cases". BBC. 28 March 2010.
- "Playboy girl and teen murder appeal". BBC News. 25 March 2015. Archived from the original on 1 January 2018.
- "Levi Bellfield: Getting Away with Murder?" (Television documentary). My5. Channel 5. 2021. Archived from the original on 5 February 2022.
- Crimewatch (26 September 2007). Crimewatch, 26/09/2007 (Television programme). BBC One. Event occurs at 29:30–43:00.
- Crimewatch (27 January 2009). 27/01/2009 (TV appeal). BBC One.
- Crimewatch (23 April 2015). Crimewatch, 23/04/2015 (Television programme). BBC One. Event occurs at 43:00–56:00.
- Campbell, Duncan (26 September 2007). "DNA link in 1975 murders". The Guardian. London.
- Chandler, Mark (5 July 2019). "John Blake lands two more true-crime tales from Sutton". The Bookseller. Archived from the original on 13 November 2023.
- Clark, Chris; Tate, Tim (2015). Yorkshire Ripper: The Secret Murders. The True Story of how Peter Sutcliffe's Terrible Reign Claimed at Least 22 More Lives. London: John Blake. ISBN 978-1-78418-418-6.
- "Young Mother Killed". Daily Mirror. 10 September 1977.
- Davenport, Justin (25 September 2007). "Police find DNA link in murders of school pupil and Bunny girl". Evening Standard. Archived from the original on 1 December 2017.
- Davies, Caroline (24 June 2011). "Levi Bellfield: obsessed with schoolgirls and sexual violence". The Guardian. Archived from the original on 23 October 2013.
- Edwards, Jeff (26 September 2007). "Bunny 'Link' to 3 Deaths". The Mirror. p. 19. Archived from the original on 9 July 2022.
- Edwards, Richard (28 February 2008). "Bouncer 'Confessed to Murder of Schoolgirl'". The Telegraph.
- Evans, Holly (19 December 2021). "Mysterious death of Patsy Morris, 14, on Hounslow Heath remains unsolved after four decades". My London. Archived from the original on 5 February 2022.
- "Eve Stratford and Lynne Weedon murders: Fresh appeal 40 years after linked killings of teenager and bunny girl". Evening Standard. 3 September 2015.
- Flowers, R. Barri (2012). The Dynamics of Murder: Kill or Be Killed. CRC Press. p. 195. ISBN 9781439879740. Archived from the original on 1 September 2016. "In general, most experts on serial murder require that a minimum of three murders be committed at different times and usually different places for a person to qualify as a serial killer."
- "Police renew appeal over two 1975 London murders". The Guardian. 25 March 2015.
- "Police receive more than 50 calls after appeal for help with 1975 murders". The Guardian. 24 April 2015.
- "Bunny girl's killer sought". The Guardian. 20 March 1975. p. 7.
- "1977: Goodbye to all that". Hammersmith & Shepherds Bush Gazette. 5 January 1978. p. 14.
- Holmes, Ronald M.; Holmes, Stephen T. (1998). Serial Murder (Second ed.). Sage. ISBN 978-0-7619-1367-2. Archived from the original on 14 May 2019. "Serial murder is the killing of three or more people over a period of more than 30 days, with a significant cooling-off period between the murders The baseline number of three victims appears to be most common among those who are the academic authorities in the field. The time frame also appears to be an agreed-upon component of the definition."
- Mansoor, Sarfraz (30 January 2009). "The murderer in our midst". The Guardian.
- McEachran, Jack (12 May 1983). "Sex case PC faces murderer quiz". Daily Mirror. p. 1 (front cover).
- "Manhunt detective thinks Playboy Bunny killer's third victim was pregnant mum-of-two". The Mirror. 9 January 2022.
- Menhinnitt, Dan (25 September 2007). "DNA evidence links murders after 32 years". Archived from the original on 28 August 2026.
- "The brutal unsolved murder where mystery killer cut Leyton Playboy bunny's throat 'almost a dozen times'". MyLondon. 31 August 2019. Archived from the original on 27 December 2021.
- Petherick, Wayne (2005). Serial Crime: Theoretical and Practical Issues in Behavioral Profiling. Elsevier. p. 190. ISBN 9780080468549. Archived from the original on 2 September 2016. "Three killings seem to be required in the most popular operational definition of serial killing since they are enough to provide a pattern within the killings without being overly restrictive."
- "Murder Squad Warns Parents". Reading Evening Post. 19 June 1980. p. 1.
- Sandrock, T. A. (22 March 1975). "Flowers clue to killer of Bunny girl". The Telegraph.
- Sandrock, T. A. (20 March 1975). "Nude Picture Bunny Girl Murdered". The Telegraph.
- Schechter, Harold (2012). The A to Z Encyclopedia of Serial Killers. Simon and Schuster. p. 73. ISBN 9781439138854. Archived from the original on 1 September 2016. "Most experts seem to agree, however, that to qualify as a serial killer, an individual has to slay a minimum of three unrelated victims."
- "Serial killer". Segen's Medical Dictionary. 2012. Archived from the original on 11 August 2016 – via TheFreeDictionary.com. "A person who murders 3+ people over a period of > 30 days, with an inactive period between each murder, and whose motivation for killing is largely based on psychological gratification."
- Sharma, Ramaa (2007). "Case of murdered model reopens". BBC. Archived from the original on 10 January 2016.
- Smith, David James (24 May 2009). "Eve Stratford: the bunny girl who was murdered". The Times. London. Archived from the original on 5 December 2025.
- "Bunny Girl murder detectives search for 'Miss Marple'". The Telegraph. 27 September 1975.
- Smith, David James (24 May 2009). "Her Killer Thinks he got away with it 30 Years Ago; This bunny girl's brutal murder was one of the most sensational unsolved crimes of the 1970s. Now, three decades on, is the net finally closing in on her killer? David James Smith investigates". Sunday Times. p. 24.
- Walton, Richard (1992). "Golden Girls' Horrible Mutations". In Mandelsberg, Rose G. (ed.). Unsolved Mysteries. Kensington Publishing Corporation. pp. 107–120. ISBN 9781558176546. Archived from the original on 16 December 2023.
- Wansell, Geoffrey (2011). The Bus Stop Killer: Milly Dowler, Her Murder and the Full Story of the Sadistic Serial Killer Levi Bellfield. UK: Penguin. ISBN 978-0241952818.
- Welch, Claire (2012). "Eve Stratford". Unsolved Crimes: From the Case Files of The People and Daily Mirror. Yeovil: Haynes. pp. 74–80. ISBN 978-0-857331-75-5.
- Whittock, Jesse (11 May 2022). "Signature Signs Global Rights To British True Crime Docs 'Bellfield' & 'West End Girls: The Search For A Serial Killer' From 'The Real Manhunter' Producer Revelation Films". Deadline. Archived from the original on 15 June 2022.
- Wright, Naomi (30 May 2005). "Mayfair Playboy murder re-opened". This is London.
