= Alex Skeel =

English domestic violence victim (born 1995)

- Born: 1995
- Occupation: Football coach
- Known for: Domestic violence survivor

Alexander Skeel (born 1995) is a domestic violence survivor whose near-fatal injuries at the hands of his girlfriend, Jordan Worth, in 2017 attracted widespread media coverage. Worth "controlled, beat, stabbed, starved and tortured Skeel, leaving him with severed tendons, fluid on the brain and burns", and prevented him from receiving medical treatment for injuries.

Worth became the first woman to be convicted of the United Kingdom's coercive control offence and in 2018 was jailed for a total of seven and half years for her crimes.

Skeel has been interviewed numerous times in the media about the abuse he suffered and his story was told in a BBC Three documentary Abused By My Girlfriend which was first shown in February 2019. He is an Ambassador for domestic violence charity The ManKind Initiative.

== Early life ==
Skeel was born prematurely in 1995 along with his twin brother. Weighing just two pounds, he was placed in intensive care and underwent multiple operations as a baby. They lived in Stewartby, south of Bedford. The twins were child models for supermarket chain Asda.

== Relationship with Worth ==
Skeel and Jordan Worth met at college in 2012 when they were both aged 16. Worth, previously a gymnast, later attended the University of Hertfordshire, obtaining a degree in Fine Arts; she wanted to become a teacher.

In June 2017, the police were called to the couple's home after neighbours had heard shouting. Upon admission to the hospital, doctors stated he was approximately 10 days away from death due to infections from burns he had sustained.

== Domestic abuse ==
Worth's abuse had begun early in the relationship, controlling which clothes Skeel wore and assaulting him. Skeel was isolated from his family, with Worth sending messages from his phone telling them not to contact him any more. She then broke his mobile phone and took over his social media accounts, setting up a Facebook account in his name which she controlled. She falsely told Skeel that his grandfather had died, and then berated him for caring about his family, after he cried about the news.

The abuse escalated, with coercive control deemed to have occurred between April 2016 and June 2017.

== Trial of Worth ==
At her trial in April 2018, Worth pleaded guilty to controlling or coercive behaviour in an intimate relationship, wounding with intent and causing grievous bodily harm. She was sentenced to seven and a half years of imprisonment. In June 2018, after a referral under the unduly lenient sentence scheme, the Court of Appeal determined that while her sentence was undoubtedly "very lenient" it was not unduly so, and she was spared an increase of her sentence. Worth refused to attend the hearing, but her solicitor claimed she felt remorse.

== See also ==
- Earl Silverman
