= Bedgebury Forest Woman =

Unidentified murder victim in England

Coordinates: 51.07365746312144°N 0.4832975663221128°E

Location body found

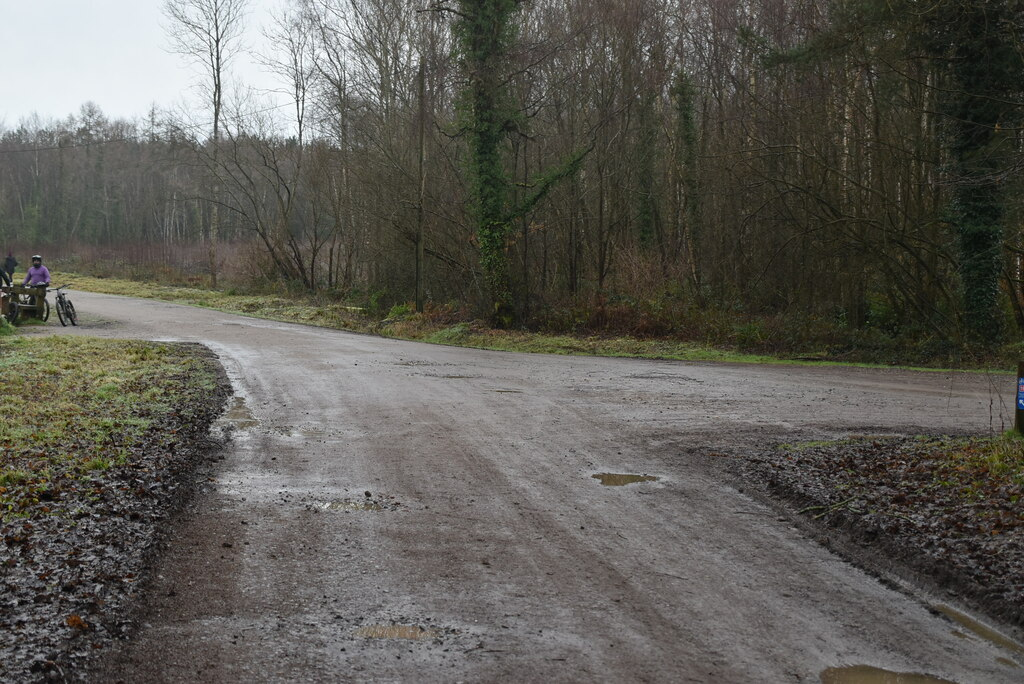
crossroads where body was found on Park Lane looking north-westerly

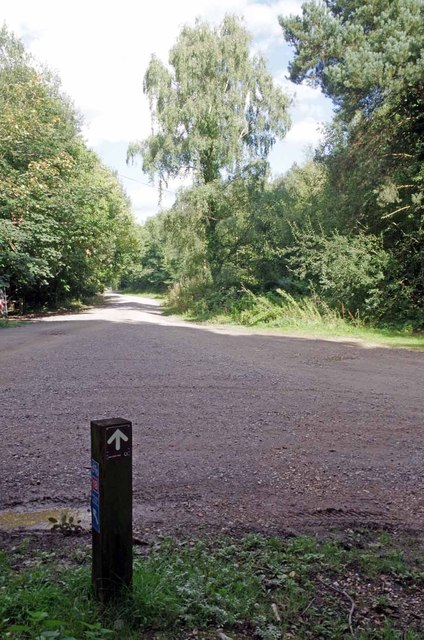
Park Lane looking east

The Bedgebury Forest Woman refers to an unknown female whose body was found in Bedgebury Forest, Kent, England, on 23 October 1979. Despite multiple investigations, an arrest and a trial, the woman has never been identified.

== Discovery of the victim ==
The body was found by a woman riding on horseback through Bedgebury Forest on Tuesday, 23 October 1979. The forest floor was dry as the weather had been dry and sunny for a few weeks. The body had been battered, mutilated, murdered and dumped but little attempt had been made to conceal the body and it was apparent in the undergrowth from the rider's position. The victim had suffered massive head injuries from a beating. A bloodstained wooden stake found near the victim's body was later concluded to have been the murder weapon. No handbag or means of identification were found with the body. Police believe that the victim had been killed up to five days prior to her discovery.

== Description of the victim ==
The severity of the injuries to the woman's head and body prevented identification. The woman was aged between 30 and 35, she was quite short at 5 ft 1 in (1.55 m) and she had a thin build. She had brown eyes and straight shoulder-length hair which she had kept in its natural, dark-brown colour

The victim was wearing black shoes, a distinctive floral dress, a black polo neck jumper and a yellow blouse. The police stated that the black and white patterned dress was the clue that was most likely to lead to the discovery of her identity. The dress was found to have been homemade from furniture fabric. It had been altered on multiple occasions; once to the hem and another to the chest area. The dress had been purchased at a charity, or second hand shop. Police believed that the victim was very poor and possibly from the north of England.

The autopsy revealed that the victim had an ectopic pregnancy which had been present for 4–6 weeks and bleeding for 2–3 weeks. The victim would have been in severe pain and may have visited a doctor suspecting appendicitis as the pain would have occurred on her right side. Stretch marks on her stomach indicated that she had probably given birth to at least one child.

The victim's molars were very worn down and she had wisdom teeth which indicated that she was at least 30 years old. There was no evidence that the victim had ever visited a dentist in her life. The victim had prominent, visibly decayed teeth. No nicotine staining was found on the victim's hands, teeth or lungs. Additionally, the victim's lungs did not exhibit the carbon deposits typical of a city-dweller, indicating that she probably lived in the countryside. Police believe the woman was of no fixed address and was a regular hitchhiker along the M1 and M6 motorways and may have had a connection with the Vale of Evesham. There was a possibility that she may have been working as a prostitute, operating from Spitalfields in London.

== Initial investigation ==
After the discovery the police searched the missing persons databases at New Scotland Yard and the UK Social Services. Hospitals and doctors surgeries were also polled for persons who matched the description of the woman. A large poster campaign was launched throughout the UK and Europe. All of these investigative efforts failed to produce a match to the woman's identity.

== Subsequent events ==
=== Jean Vera Brook ===
In 1982 another woman, Jean Vera Brook, was found dead in Bedgebury Forest around a mile away. Police said this was not linked but Brooks murder was also unsolved.

=== Crimewatch 1984 ===
In December 1984, the victim was featured on an episode of the BBC TV programme Crimewatch. Police appealed for the persons that had made, or altered, the black and white dress to come forward.

=== Reopening of the case ===
In October 1998, the case was reopened after an investigation by forensic scientists on archived evidence. The victim's case was highlighted in the national media as one of a number of such cases that had been reopened due to a new DNA technique that enabled the generation of DNA profiles from much smaller samples than had been previously possible. The size of these samples was described as being as small as a single blood cell, or a flake of skin.

=== Arrest ===
In January 1999, the first arrest in the case was made. Harry J R Pennells (b. 1925), then 73, of Ticehurst, East Sussex, was charged with the victim's murder. Pennells, who was 54 at the time of the murder was a retired lorry driver and had worked for Henley's Transport who were based in Kent at the time of the murder. Pennells had originally been questioned by police a few days after the discovery of the body. He had been interviewed three times between 1979 and 1980 and was one of a number of suspects. He had not been charged following the initial investigation. However, after specks of blood found in his lorry in 1979 were re-examined and linked to the victim police were able to make their arrest. Pennells was subsequently bailed and a report was sent to the Crown Prosecution Service.

=== Crimewatch 1999 ===
External videos
- Crimewatch U.K - February 1999 (23.02.99). Crimewatch U.K - February 1999 (23.02.99)

On 22 February 1999, the victim's case was featured on Crimewatch for a second time. It was revealed that after the original Crimewatch appeal in 1984, the person who made the black-and-white dress had made contact. The woman, who was from Stratford-upon-Avon, stated that she had given the dress to a charity shop in Evesham, Worcestershire after which police could not trace it. It appeared to have been subsequently altered to shorten the length, remove the zip from the back and add a black lace ruff to the collar. An appeal was made for the person who made these alterations to come forward.

=== Trial ===
R v Pennells
- Court: Maidstone Crown Court
- Decided: 5 June 2000
- Verdict: Not guilty

The trial started on 4 May 2000 at Maidstone Crown Court. Pennells was accused of picking up the victim at Spitalfields Market on 19 October 1979, taking her in his lorry to a delivery in Keighley, West Yorkshire, then back to drop her off in South London on the morning of 20 October and beating the victim to death with a wooden stake. Pennells told the court that he had picked up a female hitchhiker. He admitted that the hitchhiker may have been the victim, but claimed that he had dropped her off alive and was innocent of her murder.

Witnesses called by the prosecution stated that they had seen a woman matching the victim's description in Bedgebury Forest on 21 October 1979, the day after some estimations placed the murder. Two witnesses who were at the Keighley lorry depot stated that they saw, and spoke to, a young woman who was with Pennells. Staff at the Henley Transport's Rochdale depot also stated that they saw Pennells with a woman with a similar appearance to an artist's impression made of the victim.

Samples of blood and flakes of hair found in a sleeping bag on the passenger seat of the lorry matched the DNA profile of the victim. Additionally, particles of foam from a mattress in the cab of the lorry were found on the victim's dress.

The trial lasted for four weeks, after which Pennells was found not guilty in a unanimous decision made after the jury deliberated for 1 hour and 15 minutes.

=== Subsequent appeals to identify the victim ===
In October 2007, the charity Missing People appealed to the public for someone to come forward and identify the woman.
