= Murder of Esther Soper =

Unsolved 1976 murder in Plymouth, England

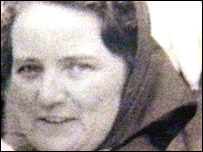
- Location: 50.376308°N 4.139249°W; 9 Trematon Terrace, Mutley, Plymouth, England
- Date: January 1, 1976
- Attack type: Murder
- Weapons: Cider bottle, stockings.
- Deaths: 1
- Perpetrator: Unknown
- Motive: Unknown
- Inquiry: 3 inquiries, 0 ongoing.
- Convicted: 0

Esther Soper was a 52-year-old woman who was killed in an attack in the hallway of her home in Mutley, Plymouth on New Year's Day (1 January) in 1976. Her murderer has not been found, and the case is currently the oldest unsolved murder in the south-west of England.

== Background ==
After the death of her husband Norman, who had worked at Plymouth Dockyard, Esther Soper moved to Mutley Plain. She lived alone and became a member of the Plymouth Brethren Christian Church.

Soper had not spoken to her father, Stanley Copeman, for fifteen years following his remarriage after her mother's death; nor to her daughter who lived nearby.

== Incident ==
9 Trematon Terrace

Soper's body was found in her home at around 9pm on 1 January 1976, after two members of the Plymouth Brethren church she regularly attended called at the house to check on her following her absence from a meeting earlier that day. Her body was discovered in the hallway of her house. She had been bludgeoned with a cider bottle and strangled to death with her own stockings, before the perpetrators wrapped her body in a curtain.

== Investigation ==
=== 1976 ===
At the time of her murder Soper was attempting to sell her house in Plymouth and had a number of appointments for people to come and view the property. One man, who gave the name Clifford Sparks, was set to view the house on the day of her murder after a viewing a few days previously. When police arrived they found her home had been "ransacked", and initially believed it to be a theft that had gone wrong, resulting in the thieves killing her.

During the initial investigation, police were unable to find Clifford Sparks. Investigators interviewed nine men with that name in the UK but failed to find any evidence linking them to her, leading police to believe the name may have been fake; however, it was not unusual at the time for estate agents to fabricate the names of potential viewers. Police also found no evidence to suggest that her murder was linked to the Brethren.

By August 1976 around 33,000 people worldwide had been interviewed by police investigators in connection with the case. There were over 80 detectives working on the inquiry at the time.

The initial investigation was closed after 7 months.

=== 1997 ===
In 1997, police made efforts to find a DNA sample of her killer from the crime scene, which could then be matched with the national DNA database. Police sent items of clothing to a forensic laboratory, but were unable to find anything other than Soper's own DNA.

=== 2006 ===
In 2006, Devon and Cornwall Police set up a Criminal Cases Review Unit (CCRU) which aimed to resolve unsolved cases over the last 30 years. Detectives believed that advancements in DNA technology could help them to find the killer, although this was later proven to be false.

== See also ==
- List of unsolved murders in the United Kingdom
