= Murder of Jean Townsend =

1954 murder in Middlesex, England

Jean Townsend (13 March 1933 – c. 14 September 1954) was a 21-year-old English woman who was murdered in September 1954 in Ruislip, Middlesex, England. Despite an extensive police investigation, no one was charged with her murder and the case remains unsolved.

Townsend was a theatrical costumier, who was returning to Ruislip from the West End of London. She was found dead, strangled with her own scarf. The autopsy revealed no signs of sexual assault. There were suspicions that the murder was connected to American servicemen based at the nearby South Ruislip Air Station.

Investigators found possible connections with recent cases of harassment of women and attacks on women in the area, and perceived similarities with unsolved murders of women in West Germany. The possibility was raised that the recent murder of another woman in London was connected to Townsend's case. Townsend's murder was thought to be connected with a later attack on another woman, and with the 1957 murder of a young mother, a few miles from where Townsend was killed. In 1971, another unsolved murder took place near South Ruislip, using the same method as that used in Townsend's murder. Press reports of the time pointed out the similarities.

In 2005, a family friend of the Townsends applied for access to the police case files under the Freedom of Information Act. The request was denied, and a decision was made to withhold the files from public inspection until 2031. The request brought new publicity to the cold case, and a new theory was publicized implicating an expatriate Italian nobleman in the murder. The authorities dismissed this theory due to lack of evidence.

== Murder ==
Jean Mary Townsend lived with her parents at the family home in Bempton Drive, South Ruislip and worked as a theatrical costumier in the West End of London. On the evening of 14 September 1954, she attended a social function in the West End, returning to South Ruislip later that night on the last Central line train. At around 11:45 pm she was seen leaving South Ruislip station and walking alone along Victoria Road. Her body was discovered the following morning on the waste ground to the north side of Victoria Road, near the junction with Angus Drive in the area now occupied by St Gregory the Great Catholic Church (opened in April 1967). The autopsy report stated that she had been strangled with her own scarf and it was reported that – despite various items of her clothing being removed – there were no signs of sexual assault.

== Investigation ==
Local suspicion fell on American servicemen based at the nearby South Ruislip Air Station. The rumours of an American being involved intensified when a resident living near the scene reported hearing a woman cry for help late on the night of the murder followed by two male voices arguing, one of which seemed to have an American accent. Subsequent rumours of alleged reluctance on the part of the United States Air Force authorities to co-operate with the Metropolitan Police in the murder inquiry served to heighten local suspicions. In the wake of the murder, a number of women came forward to report being approached or accosted by strange men in and around the area where Jean's body had been found in the days preceding the murder.

One of the women, Miss Jacqueline Cliff, told reporters how she had been approached repeatedly by a man – aged about 30 with a high forehead – who spoke with an American accent and drove an "American-type" car. Another young woman, Joan Gala, reported being attacked by a man late at night on Victoria Road on the Saturday before the murder. Her description of her attacker included the fact that he had a high forehead. It was reported that several young women had been murdered in West Germany in similar circumstances in the early 1950s, with their bodies left by the side of the German Autobahnen. Suggestions that US (or British) servicemen stationed in Germany might have been responsible prompted the Metropolitan Police to liaise with their German counterparts, but the idea of a possible link appears to have been quickly discounted.

Meanwhile, some local residents responded by organising patrols to escort women to and from the station late at night. At the inquest the coroner expressed his surprise that – apart from the obvious symptoms of asphyxiation – there were no signs of a struggle or that Townsend had physically resisted her attacker.

Another young woman – Ellen Carlin – had been murdered in London earlier that same month. Carlin was alleged to have been working as a prostitute in Pimlico and was strangled shortly after being seen with a man in a US Air Force uniform. Whether the police suspected that the two killings were linked is not known.

Some three weeks after Jean Townsend's murder, a Mrs Doris Vennell reported being followed and attacked by a man outside North Harrow tube station (on the Metropolitan line and approximately 3 miles from South Ruislip station) while returning home just after midnight. Her attacker had boarded at Baker Street and sat watching her intently until following her off the train at North Harrow. Mrs Vennell challenged him and managed to get away, but only after a struggle during which she tore some buttons off her assailant's coat. Once again, the man was described as having a high forehead.

Three years later, in 1957, a young mother called Muriel Maitland was brutally murdered in Cranford Woods near Heathrow Airport (a few miles from Ruislip). It was reported that police considered the possibility of a link with the Townsend case, but it seems that nothing came of this.

== "Ruislip's Murder Mile" ==
In June 1971, South Ruislip was the scene of another murder. On the morning of Sunday 13 June, the naked body of Gloria Booth was discovered on a recreation ground off Nairn Road, approximately half a mile from South Ruislip Underground Station and a mile from the scene of the Townsend killing. Like Jean Townsend, Mrs Booth – a 29-year-old housewife from Ealing – had died from strangulation and it appeared that once again a scarf had been used. This led at least one journalist to refer to the area as "Ruislip's Murder Mile".

== Re-examination ==
In October 1982 the Metropolitan Police announced that it was reviewing its files on the Townsend case following a number of anonymous telephone calls. The content of the calls has never been revealed, and the caller's identity remains unknown (though some newspaper reports imply it was a man.) The police stated that they were "very interested" in what the caller told them and told reporters that as a result of the calls they now felt confident that no American servicemen were implicated and also that there were no links between the Townsend murder and any other crime. Curiously, many of the press reports in 1982 stated that Jean had been raped, contradicting the original reports from 1954. Despite the police announcements and the hints of fresh information, no further developments were reported and no arrests were made.

== Freedom of Information Request ==
In 2005, a former schoolfriend of Jean's (and a neighbour and family friend of the Townsends), Reg Hargrave, applied for access to the police case files – now held by the UK National Archives at the Public Record Office in Kew – under the Freedom of Information Act. The request was refused and, following an approach to the Information Commissioner, an appeal was heard (in part in closed session) by an Information Tribunal in November 2007. In its ruling the Tribunal dismissed the appeal and upheld an earlier decision to withhold the files from public inspection until 2031. While in closed session the Tribunal was addressed by a senior Metropolitan Police detective, who presented information which the Tribunal later described in its ruling as "specific" to the Townsend case. This led them to conclude that whilst there was nothing to suggest that the identification of the murderer (either through a confession, new information or advances in forensic science) was imminent, such a development was a possibility. The Tribunal noted that a re-examination of the dead woman's clothing and other items had been undertaken in the 1990s by the Forensic Science Service. This had been done in the hope of identifying new DNA evidence, but had produced "nothing of value". The Tribunal heard that whilst the police case files were substantial, a number of items were missing. The Tribunal considered a theory – advanced by the appellant – that the killer was one Count Francesco Carlo Dalatri, an Italian nobleman of mixed English and Italian parentage, who had been living in the London area at the time of the murder. Suggestions about the Count's possible involvement seem to have originated in an interview with his former landlady, broadcast a few years earlier on John Peel's popular Home Truths programme on BBC Radio 4. In the programme it had been alleged that the Count – who was known as "Frank" to his friends – was in the habit of travelling on the London Underground late at night looking at other passengers. This had reportedly attracted the attention of the police on at least one occasion. It was further alleged that the Count had unexpectedly and hurriedly left England for Italy very shortly after the murder, never to return (it was believed that he subsequently lived in Italy until his death in 1987). It was stated that there was a locked wardrobe in the Count's rooms in London which – when his landlady and a colleague broke it open – was found to contain a USAF-issue greatcoat. The coat had a button missing and it was said that there had been rumours of such a button being discovered at the murder scene, with some reports even suggesting that one was found clutched in the victim's hand. In their ruling the Tribunal ruling made it clear that they felt there was no evidence to link the Count to the case and that the police files contained no record of a button being recovered from the murder scene. They concluded that theories about any possible involvement on the part of the Count were "highly speculative".

== Unofficial enquiries ==
The Townsend case still elicits a certain amount of interest in the Ruislip area, albeit on a limited scale. Unofficial enquiries and research are still undertaken by those who have developed an interest in it, including the appellant in the FOI case above. Though these have failed to unearth any major new pieces of evidence, a number of things have come to light. Correspondence in the 1990s with the daughter of the principal investigating officer in the case revealed that the original Metropolitan Police inquiry team in 1954 did indeed express frustration at the apparent unwillingness of the USAF base commander at South Ruislip Air Station to permit his men to be interviewed. A chance meeting in 1983 with a retired detective who had worked on the case suggested that the police had a pretty good idea who was responsible, but were unable to gather sufficient evidence to make an arrest or bring charges. An informal review of the original 1954 autopsy report by a modern-day forensic pathologist supported the bulk of the original findings, but noted that, while the victim's underwear had been removed, her overgarments were relatively undisturbed. It was suggested that this could imply the possibility that Jean Townsend's death occurred as the result of a consensual sexual act that went wrong or – perhaps more likely – an attempted rape that ended in murder. Anecdotal evidence was uncovered of how, earlier on the night of the murder, another young woman was followed by a man after leaving South Ruislip station. It was said that she had been so frightened that she had been forced to hide behind some buildings to get away from him. Whether this incident had been reported to the police at the time is not clear and – for as long as the police files remain closed – there is no easy way of verifying it.

In 2019, a 440-page study devoted to this crime was published by Strange Attractor/MIT Press. Dead Fashion Girl: A Situationist Detective Story, was written by the academic and author, Dr Fred Vermorel. It reviewed the extant theories and rumours surrounding the crime, and mounted an investigation based on interviews with survivors and ex-police officers, as well as hitherto unseen documents. The book also examined Jean Townsend's Soho clubland and social connections, and her upbringing in suburban Ruislip. It identified a previously unknown suspect, a petty criminal and black marketeer, Brinsley McDowell, who allegedly died in police custody, as the potential murderer, and suggested that the original investigation had been marred by incompetence and obfuscation.

== Afterword ==
Over half a century later, the murder of Jean Townsend remains unsolved. The killer or killers of Ellen Carlin, Muriel Maitland and Gloria Booth have also evaded justice.
