= Lie on file =

Legal term in English law

In English law, applicable to England and Wales, a criminal charge is allowed to lie on file when the presiding judge agrees that there is enough evidence for a case to be made, but that it is not in the public interest for prosecution to proceed, usually because the defendant has admitted other, often more serious, charges. No admission to the charge is made by the defendant, and no verdict is recorded against them.

Charges which have lain on file may be reinstated at a later date, but only with the permission of the trial judge or the Court of Appeal.

Charges which have been laid on file have on occasions been taken into account in actions under the Proceeds of Crime Act 2002, to confiscate the gains of criminal activity. The legal commentator David Winch has argued that this is in breach of the presumption of innocence.
