= Michael Sams =

English kidnapper, extortionist and murderer

- Born: Michael Benneman Sams; 11 August 1941 (age 85); Keighley, West Riding of Yorkshire, England
- Occupation: Heating engineer
- Status: Incarcerated
- Convictions: Murder, kidnapping, blackmail (1993)
- Penalty: Life imprisonment (1993)

Michael Benneman Sams (born 11 August 1941) is an English kidnapper, extortionist, rapist and murderer. He kidnapped Julie Dart in July 1991 and later murdered her following her attempted escape. He subsequently kidnapped Stephanie Slater in January 1992, eventually releasing her after payment of a ransom. Slater was also raped during her imprisonment by Sams.

After Sams was convicted and imprisoned, he attacked a female probation officer. He also became known for his attempts to sue the prison, initially successfully, for losing his artificial leg, and then because his bed was too hard.

== Early life ==
Michael Sams was born and raised in Keighley, West Riding of Yorkshire. He joined the Merchant Navy at the age of 20. After three years, he returned to Keighley and worked as a lift engineer, graduating to become a central heating engineer, later establishing his own company. However, Sams turned to crime and was first imprisoned in 1978 for stealing a car and making a false insurance claim. While in prison, Sams was diagnosed with a cancer that led to the amputation of one of his legs. After his release, Sams was forced to sell his ailing business and gained a job for Black & Decker. He later started a new business in the 1980s, selling power tools.

Sams was married three times. He had two sons by his first wife, but the marriage broke down shortly before he was sent to prison. His second marriage also ended in divorce. At the time of his arrest for the kidnappings he lived in Sutton-on-Trent, Nottinghamshire with his third wife.

== Kidnappings ==
=== Julie Dart ===
On 9 July 1991, Sams drove to a local red light area and picked up Julie Dart, an 18-year-old Leeds resident. She was blindfolded and taken to Sams' warehouse, where she was placed in a coffin-like box and chained to the floor. According to Sams' later confession, Dart freed herself from the box in an attempt to escape, but was unable to leave the room. Sams, who had wired an alarm to the box, returned to chain her to a roof beam. The following day, Sams forced Dart to write a letter to her boyfriend demanding a ransom of £140,000, or "the hostage would never be seen again". He also made her write other notes. After the notes were written, Sams murdered Dart with a hammer. Nine days later he dumped her body in a field in Easton, Lincolnshire.

Since it was never likely that Dart's ransom would be paid, it has been suggested that Sams always intended to kill her. Paul Britton, a clinical psychologist who advised the detectives who interviewed Sams, argued that he abducted a sex worker because it would be relatively easy and was good "practice". It would also not create too much of "a stir". By killing Dart, and leaving her body where it would easily be found, Sams would "convince the police that he was to be regarded as a serious adversary" and intimidate his next victims into paying up.

Sams continued to send messages to the police. One stated: "prostitutes are easy to pick up, and I won't spend any more time in prison for killing two instead of one." He later claimed to have kidnapped another sex worker, but police could find no evidence any sex worker was missing. Sams also sent messages stating he would intentionally cause a train crash unless he was paid a ransom.

=== Stephanie Slater ===
Some months later, on 22 January 1992, Sams kidnapped another woman. Using a false name, he arranged to meet Stephanie Slater, an estate agent with a local branch of the company Shipways, ostensibly to view a property in Turnberry Road, Great Barr, Birmingham. At the property he attacked Slater, tied her up, and then took her to his workshop. Sams again demanded a ransom, this time from Slater's manager at the estate agency. When it was paid, Sams released Slater. Given his previous crime, police had expected the kidnapper to kill Slater. They hoped to stop him by following him after he picked up the ransom, but Sams had anticipated this, and devised an elaborate scheme to successfully give them the slip.

Interviewed in 2013 on BBC Radio 4's One to One programme, Slater said that for eight days she was held – handcuffed, legs bound, blindfolded and gagged – in a "coffin" inside a wheelie bin laid horizontally. Sams had told her she would be electrocuted if she tried to move. Slater said that when she was allowed out of the coffin for food, she chatted about herself to Sams, "to humanise" herself and to increase her chances of survival. Within 12 hours of her release, she was made to face a press conference, even though she was still drugged and highly distressed. Police later acknowledged that this was an error of judgement.

In her 1995 book about her ordeal, Beyond Fear: My Will to Survive, Slater wrote that Sams raped her on the first night of her imprisonment. After her release, Slater had originally not disclosed the rape. She later said that this was to spare her mother, who had a heart condition, from unnecessary further anguish. Sams denied raping Slater, asserting, "I cannot allow this to go unchallenged". He made the unsubstantiated claim that they had a consensual affair and attempted to sue Slater for libel, but lost the case. Slater has also discussed the rape in a Crimes That Shook Britain documentary about the case, in which she also states that Sams later requested to have further sex with her, but this time relented after Slater refused.

Out of the £175,000 ransom that was paid for the release of Slater, police located £150,000 buried in a field by using ground-penetrating radar. The remaining £25,000 was never recovered.

Following her release, Slater felt unable to return to work as an estate agent, and moved to the Isle of Wight in 1993. She subsequently worked with police forces to advise them on how to deal with kidnap survivors, and with the survivors themselves, to help them to recover from their ordeals. She died on 31 August 2017, aged 50, from cancer.

== Arrest and conviction ==
On the BBC television programme Crimewatch, the police made public a tape recording of the kidnapper's voice, which was recognised by Sams' first wife. Sams was arrested, and forensic evidence was gathered of his responsibility for Dart's murder.

At his trial at Nottingham Crown Court in 1993, Sams admitted to the kidnapping of Slater, but denied the kidnap and murder of Dart. On 8 July that year the jury found him guilty of murdering Dart, and he was sentenced to life imprisonment for her murder and the abduction of Slater. He was also found guilty of attempting to blackmail the police and British Rail; he was sentenced to 10 years for each of four blackmail attempts. Sams confessed to Dart's murder in prison, three days after he was found guilty. He had asked the senior investigating officer Detective Chief Superintendent, Bob Taylor, to visit him in jail. During this visit he confessed to Dart's murder, and revealed the date upon which he had carried it out; his confession was covertly recorded and not released for thirty years. The recording was used in a 2022 Discovery Plus documentary Michael Sams: Kidnapper Killer. Sams told officers he had made the confession for the sake of Julie's grieving mother. He stated: "I've been going over it and thinking it's only fair that she knows I did it. I mean, obviously, I did do it. What can I tell her? I do feel sorry for her, yes."

== Imprisonment ==
Sams continued to offend after he was imprisoned, attacking a female probation officer with a metal spike in October 1995 at Wakefield Prison. At his trial in February 1997 at Durham Crown Court, he received an additional eight years to his term for this crime.

Sams was awarded £4,000 damages when the prison service lost his artificial leg during a transfer. The award caused considerable public outrage. He also brought a civil case because he believed that his prison bed was too hard. A further complaint was that he was unfairly held in solitary confinement leading to a loss of earnings, and that works of art he had painted in prison had gone missing. In April 2007, a letter by Sams was published by Inside Time, a newspaper for prisoners, in which he claimed "OAPs [pensioners] in prison are far better off than those in the community."

As of 2025, Sams is still in prison. A minimum term of 25 years in prison was originally ordered but Sams, now in his 80s, has been imprisoned for well over 30 years and is now among the oldest and longest-serving life sentence prisoners in England and Wales. His latest parole denial was in April 2023, when the parole board panel concluded that the proposed release plan would not be "robust enough to manage Mr Sams in the community at this stage". He was also denied transfer to an open prison.

== Other allegations ==
Crime writer Christopher Berry-Dee, in Unmasking Mr Kipper: Who Really Killed Suzy Lamplugh?, argued Sams killed missing estate agent Suzy Lamplugh in 1986, but this has been dismissed by police, who have named another man as their sole suspect. (Note: Police named another man, John Cannan, imprisoned since 1989 for other crimes, as responsible for the murder of Lamplugh.)

== Dramatisation and documentaries ==
In 1993, the kidnapping of Slater and subsequent manhunt for Sams was the subject of an edition of the BBC One series Crimewatch File, titled "A Murderer's Game", which reconstructed some of the events. A dramatisation of Slater's book, Beyond Fear (1997), was broadcast on the opening night of Channel 5. Adapted by Don Shaw, it was directed by Jill Green, with Gina McKee as Slater and Sylvester McCoy as Sams.

In November 2022, BBC Radio Nottingham broadcast the first episode of an eight-part podcast, The Kidnapping of Stephanie Slater; from July 2023, this was followed by a second series of seven episodes. Discovery Plus produced a documentary on the case, Michael Sams: Kidnapper Killer, which aired in July 2022. A two-part documentary, The Girl in the Box: The Kidnapping of Stephanie Slater, was screened on Channel 5 on 28 February and 1 March 2023.
