= Disappearance of Suzy Lamplugh =

1986 disappearance of woman in London

Coordinates: 51.48103°N 0.20113°W

- Lamplugh with her hair tinted blonde, as it was on the day she disappeared
- Born: 3 May 1961; Cheltenham, Gloucestershire, England
- Disappeared: 28 July 1986 (aged 25); Fulham, London, England
- Status: Missing for 40 years, 2 months and 29 days; declared dead in absentia on 27 July 1993
- Occupation: Estate agent

Susannah Jane Lamplugh is an English missing person last seen on 28 July 1986. A 25-year-old estate agent, she left her office in Fulham, West London, to meet a client referred to in her work diary as "Mr Kipper." She was last seen later that day near the property she was scheduled to show. Despite extensive police investigations and public appeals, no trace of her has ever been found. Lamplugh was declared legally dead in 1993, presumed murdered.

John Cannan (1954–2024), a convicted murderer and sex offender, was identified by police as the prime suspect in the Lamplugh disappearance in 2002. Cannan had been released from prison three days prior to the disappearance and was later convicted of the 1987 murder of Shirley Banks, as well as multiple rapes and attempted abductions. Cannan claimed to know the identity of Lamplugh's killer, alleging the same individual was responsible for Banks's murder. He was also reported to have visited a property for sale on Shorrolds Road shortly before Lamplugh's disappearance, where he behaved suspiciously. Forensic evidence later indicated Lamplugh had been in a car owned by Cannan at the time she went missing, although this evidence was not considered sufficient for prosecution.

The Crown Prosecution Service concluded there was insufficient evidence to charge Cannan, although police took the highly unusual step of publicly stating they believed he had killed Lamplugh.

== Disappearance ==
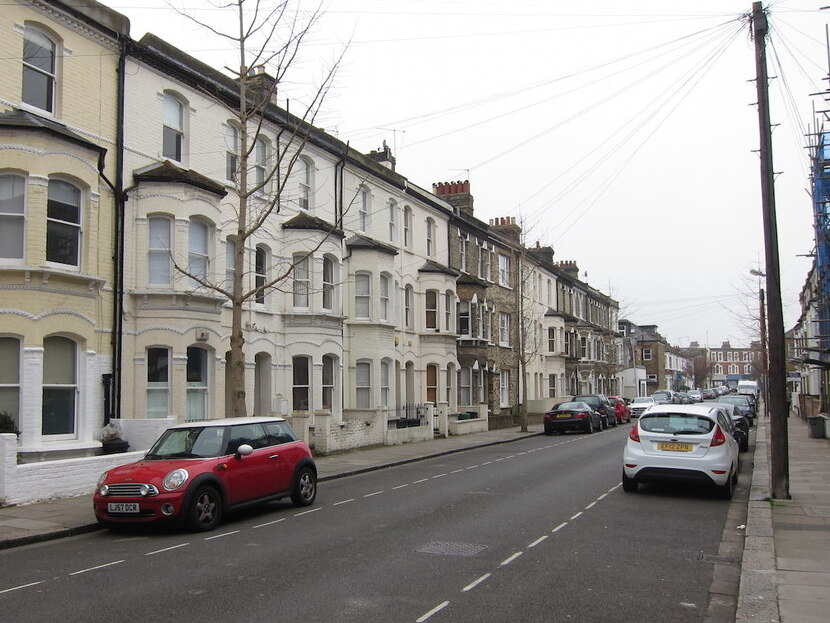
The 37 Shorrolds Road property can be seen in the centre by the second tree from the left (a white building with no railings).

Suzy Jane Lamplugh was an estate agent working for an agency called Sturgis at 654 Fulham Road, West London. She was reported missing after an appointment to show a house in Shorrolds Road, Fulham, to a man calling himself "Mr Kipper." Her office diary recorded the details of the appointment as: "12.45 Mr. Kipper – 37 Shorrolds O/S" (the "O/S" annotation signifies "outside the property").

Three witnesses observed Lamplugh outside 37 Shorrolds Road between 12:45 and 1:00 pm. One witness walking home past the property saw Lamplugh at the gateway of the property at 12:50 pm, appearing to be waiting for someone. Ten minutes later, another witness, who owned the house next door, heard someone leaving 37 Shorrolds Road and saw Lamplugh and a man leaving the house and looking back up at it. This sighting was later the basis of an identikit of the unidentified man.

The key locations involved in Lamplugh's disappearance in Fulham.

1. Wormwood Scrubs prison hostel.
2. Sturgis estate agents, where Suzy was working the day she disappeared.
3. 37 Shorrolds Road 12:45 – 1:00 p.m. sightings.
4. 123 Stevenage Road 12:45 p.m. sighting white Ford Fiesta works car parked.
5. Fulham Palace Road 2:45 p.m. sighting driving north with a man.
6. Prince of Wales pub where her diary was taken.
7. Stevenage Road approximately 2-3 p.m. sighting of a woman fighting with a man in a BMW car that afternoon.
8. Langthorne Street sighting of Suzy in a hat outside a property around lunchtime. 9. 123 Stevenage Road 10:00 p.m. Suzy's white Ford Fiesta works car found by police.

The latter sighting was corroborated by a third witness who was walking past the property at around the same time, noticing that the man was holding a bottle of champagne adorned with ribbons. This sighting was later the basis of another identikit picture drawn of the man. Other witnesses reported that they then saw the pair entering a car. The neighbour thought that the pair had been arguing before entering the car. The man was described as a white male aged between 25 and 30, with a dark complexion and with dark hair swept back. He was immaculately dressed in a dark charcoal suit, and was described as a "public schoolboy type." He may have had a broken nose.

One witness said that he had seen a "couple arguing" between 2:00 and 2:30 pm in the area. Another sighting saw Lamplugh driving erratically from Shorrolds Road, arguing with the man in the car, causing the witness to swerve to avoid a collision. Lamplugh's white Ford Fiesta (registration B396 GAN) was sighted poorly parked outside a garage opposite 123 Stevenage Road, about 1 mile (1.6 km) away, by several witnesses at various points in the afternoon. However, Barbara Whitfield, a close friend of Lamplugh's, insisted that she had seen her driving with a man north up the Fulham Palace Road at around 2:45 pm. Whitfield waved to Lamplugh as she cycled south down the road, but Lamplugh was talking to her passenger and did not see her. As Whitfield was the only witness that day who actually knew Lamplugh, her sighting was afforded significant weight. A woman living at 139 Stevenage Road also reported possibly seeing Lamplugh with a smartly dressed man by the spot where her car was seen parked.

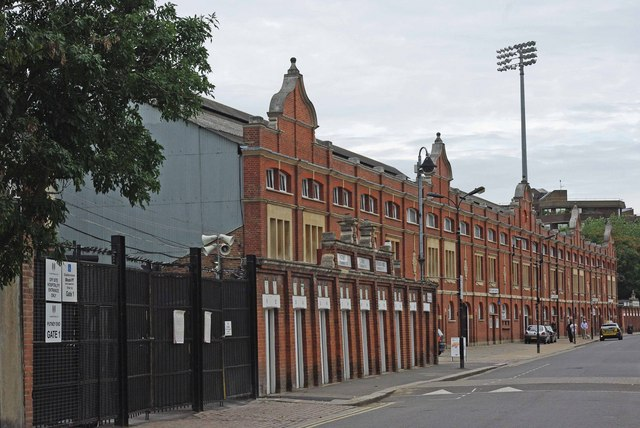
The entrances to Fulham F.C.'s Craven Cottage on Stevenage Road, where Lamplugh was seen struggling with a man in a dark-coloured, left-hand drive BMW driving south.

By 3:30 pm, Lamplugh's colleagues at the estate agency were becoming concerned that she had not returned. At 4:30 they travelled to 37 Shorrolds Road to discover she wasn't there. At 5:30, they called police to report her missing. At 10:00 pm, a police officer found Lamplugh's car parked in the same spot at which it had been sighted that afternoon, next to another house for sale. The vehicle appeared to have been parked in haste, as the driver's door was unlocked, the handbrake was not enabled and the key was missing. The car was parked poorly and was partly overlapping a garage. Lamplugh's purse was found in the car, but neither her own keys nor the keys to 37 Shorrolds Road were found. The driver's seat was pushed back to a position from which Lamplugh would not have been able to drive the car, indicating that someone else had driven the vehicle.

Police suggested that a black, left-hand-drive BMW may have been involved following an eyewitness account of a car of that description seen parked in Shorrolds Road. One of the witnesses remembered seeing it because many cars in the road had been double parked, causing him some difficulty driving through. Another witness corroborated this account and said that he had seen the dark-coloured BMW parked almost outside 37 Shorrolds Road. Witnesses also said that they had seen two white Ford Fiestas parked at the road that day.

A witness emerged sometime later with another significant sighting. The witness had offered information after the disappearance, but his account was dismissed at that time because he had described a blond-haired woman, and the police incorrectly assumed that Lamplugh had brown hair when she vanished. The witness was jogging when he saw a car speeding south down Stevenage Road (the same road in which Lamplugh's car was later found abandoned) as he emerged from Bishops Park into the road at the exit by Fulham F.C.'s Craven Cottage stadium. The car, which he noticed was a dark-coloured left-hand-drive BMW, suddenly stopped further down the road and a woman who matched Lamplugh's appearance was seen struggling with a man inside the car and sounding the horn in an apparent attempt to attract attention. In his description of the incident, the witness stated:

I came out of the park to be met by a BMW which tore across the road and came to a halt with somebody with their hand on the hooter, pressing it for a very long time. As I stood there I saw a blonde young lady. She looked as though she was laughing, or she could have been screaming. What worried me was how could she drive with what was going on? But it never occurred to me that it was a left-hand drive car.

A sighting was also reported witnessing a woman matching Lamplugh's appearance on the adjacent Langthorne Street.

== Initial investigations ==
=== Missing-person inquiry ===
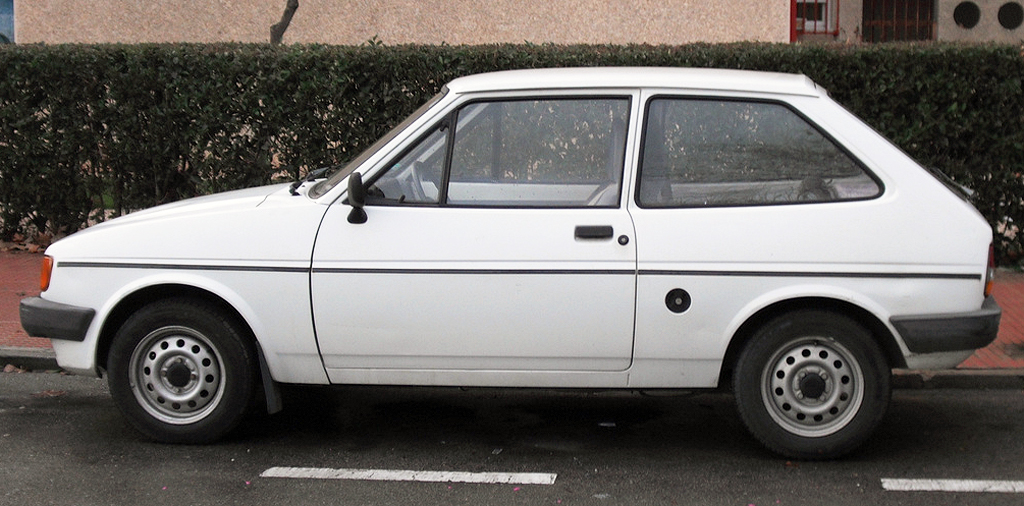
A white Ford Fiesta Mk2, similar to Lamplugh's car that was found abandoned.

Lamplugh's boyfriend, a 27-year-old stockbroker, and her male flatmate were both questioned by police, but both had solid alibis with corroborating witnesses. Her two-bedroom flat in Putney was searched, but nothing notable or suspicious was found. It was soon suggested in the press that if "Mr. Kipper's" first name was Dan, the combined would be an anagram of "kidnapper." Lamplugh's office manager revealed that red roses had been delivered to the office by a mystery man in the days before she had disappeared.

Police released a photo of Lamplugh with dark brown hair, but she had tinted her hair blond on the Friday before she vanished. The initial investigation was conducted without computers, using an old-fashioned index card system in which all leads were filed on approximately 26,000 cards. Because Lamplugh was only considered a missing person, known criminals in the area were not considered as suspects.

Six months after Lamplugh's disappearance, a man informed police that he had discovered that a BMW that had been left abandoned in a road for some months was registered to a Belgian man known as Mr. Kiper, and detectives believed that this information was significant. However, the car's owner was located in Belgium and had a confirmed alibi for the day of the disappearance, and his BMW had been in a garage in Belgium on that day. He was swiftly eliminated as a suspect.

One year after Lamplugh vanished, detectives noted that the artist's impression of Mr. Kipper strongly resembled John Cannan, a convicted rapist who had been residing in a nearby prison hostel outside Wormwood Scrubs Prison around the time of the disappearance. In 1980, he had raped and beaten his girlfriend when she tried to leave him, and had raped a shopkeeper at knifepoint in 1981.

Cannan had been on day release from prison in the months preceding Lamplugh's disappearance and held a job in the area as a porter. He was public school-educated and was known for his ability to attract women. In the weeks before Lamplugh disappeared, Cannan had told inmates and workmates that he was frequenting wine bars in Fulham and had met a new "uptown" girlfriend named Susu. Lamplugh had visited some of these wine bars, including one located opposite from her office. Cannan also frequented a pub in Putney that Lamplugh visited on 25 July, the same day on which Cannan was released from prison, three days before her disappearance. Cannan confirmed in 2021 that he had visited these establishments. He often delivered roses to women as a romantic ploy and had told people that he was interested in buying a property in the area.

In June 1987, Lamplugh's mother Diana stated that she believed that her daughter was dead.

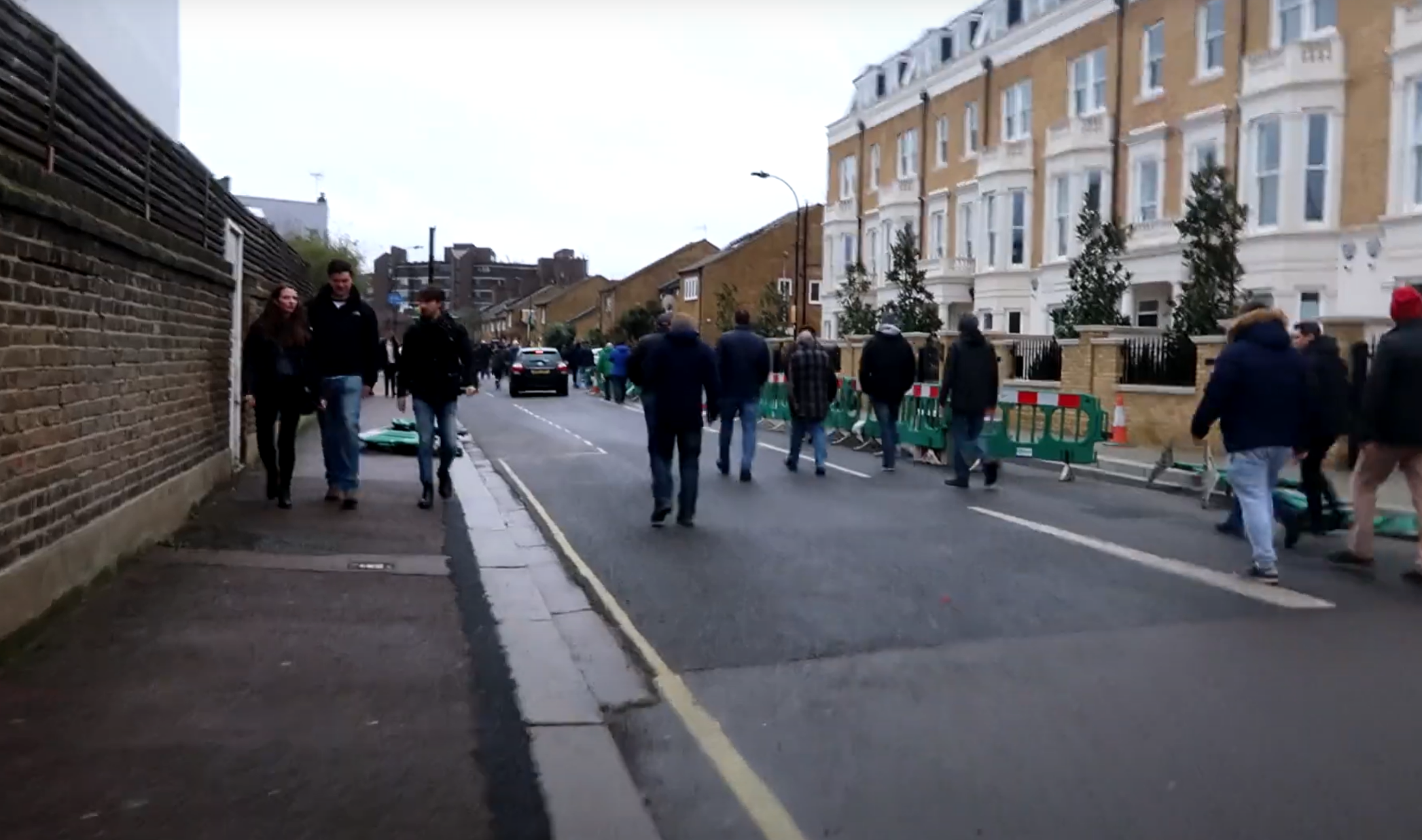
The northern part of Stevenage Road where Lamplugh's car was found abandoned.

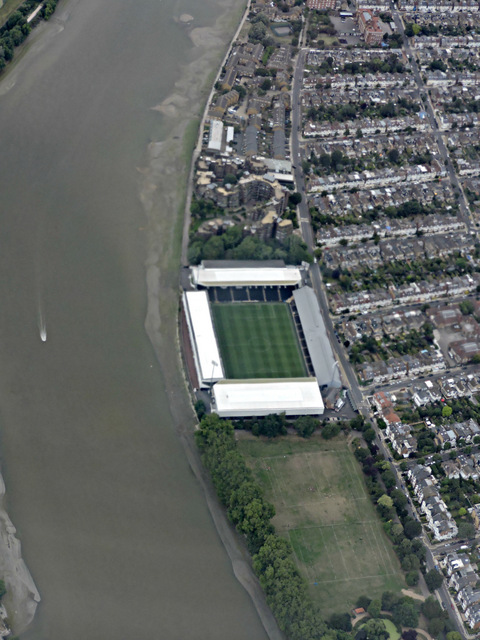
Craven Cottage and Stevenage Road, Fulham. Lamplugh's car was found abandoned toward the northern end of the road, and she was sighted struggling with a man in a car by the southeast corner of the stadium.

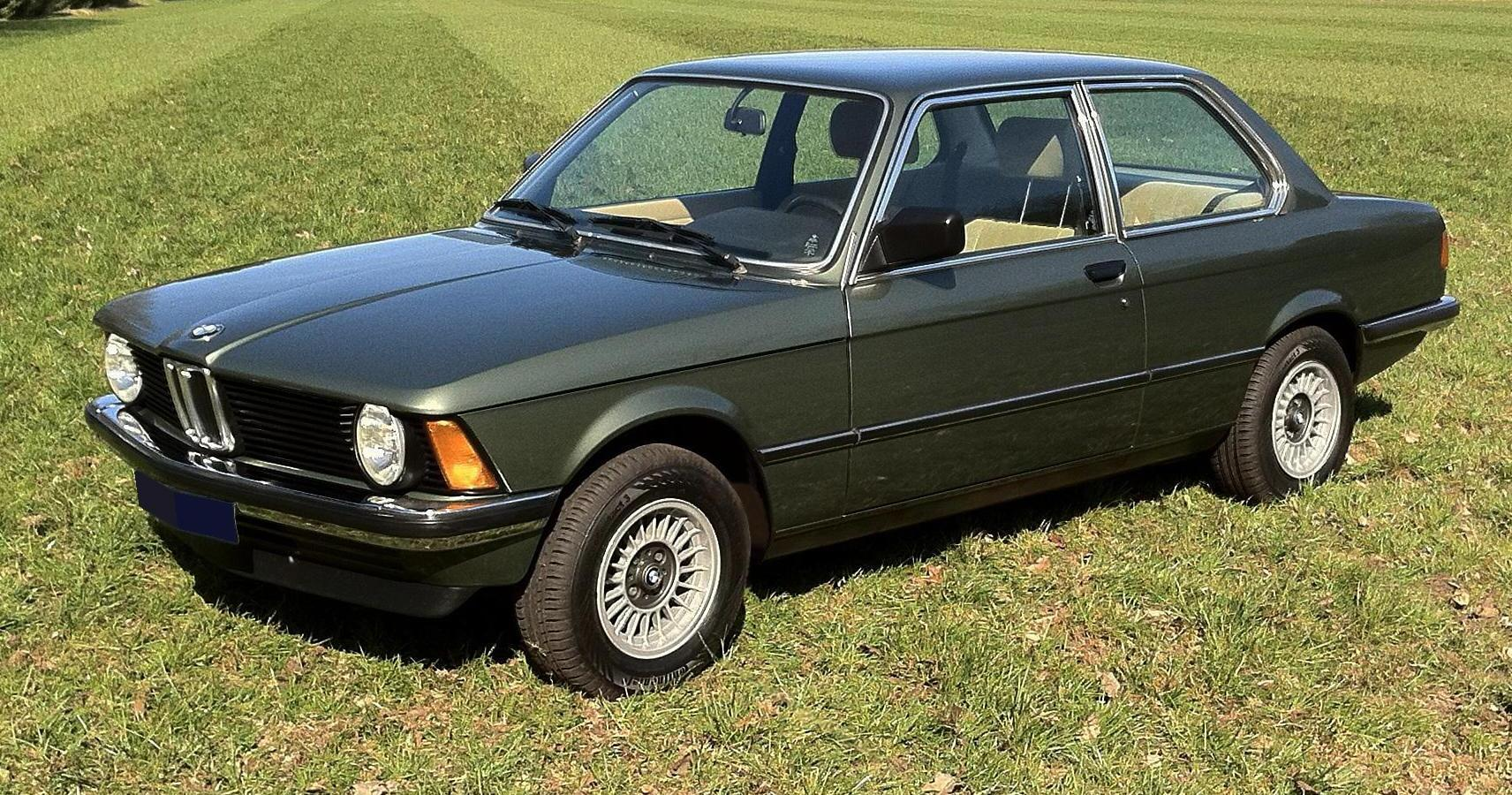
A dark-coloured left-hand drive (unusual in the UK) BMW E21 similar to the car in which Lamplugh was seen struggling with a man.

=== Shirley Banks and Cannan links investigated ===
In October 1987, fifteen months after Lamplugh's disappearance, Cannan abducted and murdered 29-year-old Shirley Banks from Bristol. Cannan had also attempted to abduct a woman the night before he had abducted Banks and had been visiting wine bars in Bristol to search for victims. He held Banks captive in his flat for eighteen hours before killing her and dumping her at a site in the Quantock Hills known as Dead Woman's Ditch. He attempted to rape two women in a shop three weeks later after driving to the shop in his black right-hand drive BMW. Inside his car was found an imitation handgun, handcuffs and the tax disc for Banks's car. Soon after Cannan was arrested, Banks's Mini car was found hidden in his garage, with a new, false number plate affixed reading "SLP 386S."

Detectives later noted that the letters SLP could signify Lamplugh's name and the number 86 for 1986, the year in which she vanished. Journalists began to note the likeness between Cannan and the photofit in the Lamplugh case, and speculated about a link between the Banks and Lamplugh cases. It was also known that Cannan had joined a dating agency in Bristol weeks before he had murdered Banks, providing the false name of "John Peterson," and had presented himself in a recorded video as a successful, smartly dressed businessman. The video remains publicly available.

Detectives from the Metropolitan Police travelled to Bristol to interview Cannan about the Lamplugh disappearance. When asked if he understood the significance of the number plate, he replied that it could be seen as a reference to Lamplugh, whom the detectives had not yet mentioned. However, Cannan claimed that he had chosen the letters for the plate at random. He further claimed that he had purchased the car from a "Bristol businessman" who was responsible for "the murders of Shirley Banks, Suzy Lamplugh and another girl" and that the man was in a great deal of trouble. Cannan was known for masquerading as a Bristol businessman. When asked if the man was himself, Cannan provided an affirmative response but immediately recanted and ended the interview because he was overcome with emotion.

Cannan was sentenced to life imprisonment for the murder of Banks and for several other rapes, abductions and attempted abductions. He was also convicted of the rape of a woman in Reading on the train line between London and Bristol, six weeks after his release from Wormwood Scrubs Prison. The sentencing judge told Cannan: "[Y]ou should never again be at liberty outside of prison walls." Further interviews were conducted with Cannan regarding Lamplugh's disappearance in 1988, 1989 and 1990. However, he was not placed on an identity parade.

In 1990, a woman named Gilly Paige, with whom Cannan had been in a relationship after Lamplugh's disappearance, informed police that he had spoken about the Lamplugh case and told her that Lamplugh was buried at Norton Barracks near Worcester. Another former girlfriend, Daphne Sargent, also believed Cannan to be responsible, saying: "As soon as I heard about Suzy, I knew it was John. It had all the hallmarks— right down to the champagne."

=== Cold case ===
In the years after Lamplugh's disappearance, police tested the DNA of 800 unidentified bodies and skeletal remains that matched her description. Lamplugh was officially declared dead at her parents' behest, exactly seven years after her 1986 disappearance, on 27 July 1993. She was presumed to have been murdered.

== Andrew Stephen book controversy ==
In 1988, journalist Andrew Stephen published a highly controversial book on the Lamplugh case. The book, which was initially supported by the Lamplugh family before they read its draft versions, included several allegations about Lamplugh's private life, including the suggestion that she was involved in prostitution. The book was widely labelled as salacious and false, and Stephen was accused of victim blaming. In an unprecedented move, the Metropolitan Police responded to the book by defending Lamplugh's personal life and stating "our investigations revealed nothing more than that Suzy was a modern young woman."

A highly critical review of the book in The Times asserted that Stephen had included a large amount of his own speculations on what he called Lamplugh's "quest for sexual fulfilment" because he needed filler material to add to the story. Lamplugh's family brought legal action and forced Stephen to add a disclaimer to the book stating that the family did not recognise or accept his portrayal of Lamplugh.

== Michael Sams speculation and elimination ==
In the mid-1990s, speculation arose that Michael Sams may have murdered Lamplugh, as he had just been convicted of kidnapping an estate agent named Stephanie Slater in Birmingham, as well as murdering Leeds sex worker Julie Dart. However, police found no evidence for the theory and discounted it, noting that Sams' crimes were likely to have been influenced by the high-profile Lamplugh case. Furthermore, Sams only had one leg by 1986, and no witness sightings of the man seen with Lamplugh on that day reported him walking with a limp or having only one leg.

== Case reopened ==
=== Reinvestigations ===
The photofit of the man seen outside 37 Shorrolds Road with Lamplugh in July 1986, compared to John Cannan's arrest photo in October 1987.

In 1999, an internal report by the Metropolitan Police criticised the handling of the original investigation and failure to further investigate Cannan. A new reinvestigation was launched in the early 2000s with a new team whose detectives were directed to determine whether Cannan could be eliminated as a suspect or implicated in Lamplugh's murder. The reinvestigations established that Cannan could not be eliminated and discovered more evidence that implicated him.

The paper index cards used in the original investigation were computerised, and investigators learned that several estate agents in Fulham had been visited at the time by a man calling himself Mr. Kipper. Detectives believed that this had been Cannan seeking potential victims for abduction and murder. In the late 1970s and into 1980, during the final years of Cannan's troubled marriage, there had been a series of mysterious rapes in homes for sale in the West Midlands, where Cannan was living. The unidentified rapist specifically targeted homes on the market for sale by estate agents and became known as the "house for sale rapist."

Twenty women were assaulted and raped in properties in the area, and no perpetrator was ever arrested for the crimes. Police suspect that Cannan was responsible for the crimes, which began as his marriage was failing. The rapes stopped in early 1980 when Cannan began a new relationship with a woman named Sharon Major. Detectives would later note that the offences bore all of the hallmarks of Cannan's later crimes and also noted the similarities to the Lamplugh case. Cannan had appeared uninvited at a house that was for sale in Shorrolds Road days before Lamplugh was last seen, believing that the young female occupant was alone in the house. He acted strangely until the woman's husband appeared, causing him to quickly leave.

After new reconstructions were shown on the BBC's Crimewatch in 2000, including correct pictures of Lamplugh with blond hair, new witnesses emerged. The witnesses included a man who said that he had seen a man resembling Cannan looking into the window of Lamplugh's estate agency on the day on which she had disappeared. Lamplugh had worked at a desk near the window, in part because the office believed that positioning an attractive woman by the window would attract customers. Some witnesses emerged after police showed Cannan's 1987 dating video who positively identified him as a man whom they had seen in Fulham that day.

A mass of circumstantial evidence was uncovered that also pointed to Cannan. It was discovered that Lamplugh had disclosed to relatives shortly before she vanished that she had a new boyfriend from the Bristol area, where Cannan had moved days before the disappearance and from where his family originated. Lamplugh also told a relative shortly before she vanished that she was concerned about the man and was becoming scared of him. Despite being in prison in the borough of Hammersmith and Fulham before the disappearance, Cannan denied ever having been to Fulham. Police disproved this claim, as Cannan was known to have had worked as a porter in the area at the time while on day release from prison. Witness sightings of a dark, left-hand-drive BMW parked near Lamplugh and in which she was seen struggling added significance when it emerged that Cannan owned such a car at the time, which he had used to commit crimes with a fellow inmate. Cannan did not have an alibi for the days after he left prison and claims to not recall where he was at the time of the disappearance, despite having an impeccable memory of other events at the time. Furthermore, Cannan's nickname in prison had been "Mr Kipper" because he wore kipper-style broad ties.

In December 2000, Cannan was arrested on suspicion of Lamplugh's abduction and murder and interviewed at Hammersmith police station. Video footage of parts of the interview were later leaked publicly and are still available (Note: See In the Footsteps of Killers) for public viewing. In the footage, Cannan says that there are "one or two things I haven't been caught for." Over five days of interviews, Cannan did not provide interviewers with any information that could eliminate him from the inquiry and did not provide an alibi for his movements between 25 and 28 July 1986. In September 2001, Cannan was arrested again and questioned at a London police station, but he again provided no information that could eliminate him from the inquiry.

==== Mysterious call on the afternoon of disappearance ====
Investigators believe that Lamplugh placed a mysterious phone call during the afternoon in which she disappeared. Three days prior, on the same day on which Cannan was released from the prison, Lamplugh had visited the Prince of Wales pub in Putney, which was also frequented by Cannan. While there, the contents of her handbag went missing, and after she had left, they were found by the landlord of the pub. The landlord telephoned Lamplugh to inform her and she arranged to collect her belongings at 6 p.m. on Monday 28 July, the day of her disappearance. Several hours after she vanished, a woman identifying herself as "Sarah" phoned the pub saying that she had a message for Lamplugh and left her number. A man then phoned the pub claiming to be a policeman and asking if the pub had Lamplugh's diary and chequebook. Police confirmed the man was not a policeman, and it was not known who Sarah was. The landlord said that he gave the paper upon which he had written the phone number to police, although it was later lost.

The first call was placed well before Lamplugh's disappearance had even been reported, and it may have been Lamplugh making a plea for help or calling under duress. The man identifying as a policeman may have been Cannan. When Banks had been abducted by Cannan and held captive in his flat in 1987, she placed a call under duress to her workplace the next morning, stating that she was sick and would not be reporting to work that day. It is believed that she placed the call because Cannan had convinced her that he would release her unharmed. The call was the last message received from Banks before she was found murdered.

Detectives on the reinvestigation team also believed that Cannan could have been responsible for taking the contents of Lamplugh's handbag in the pub, and stated the events were a clear indicator of stalking.

=== Searches for body ===
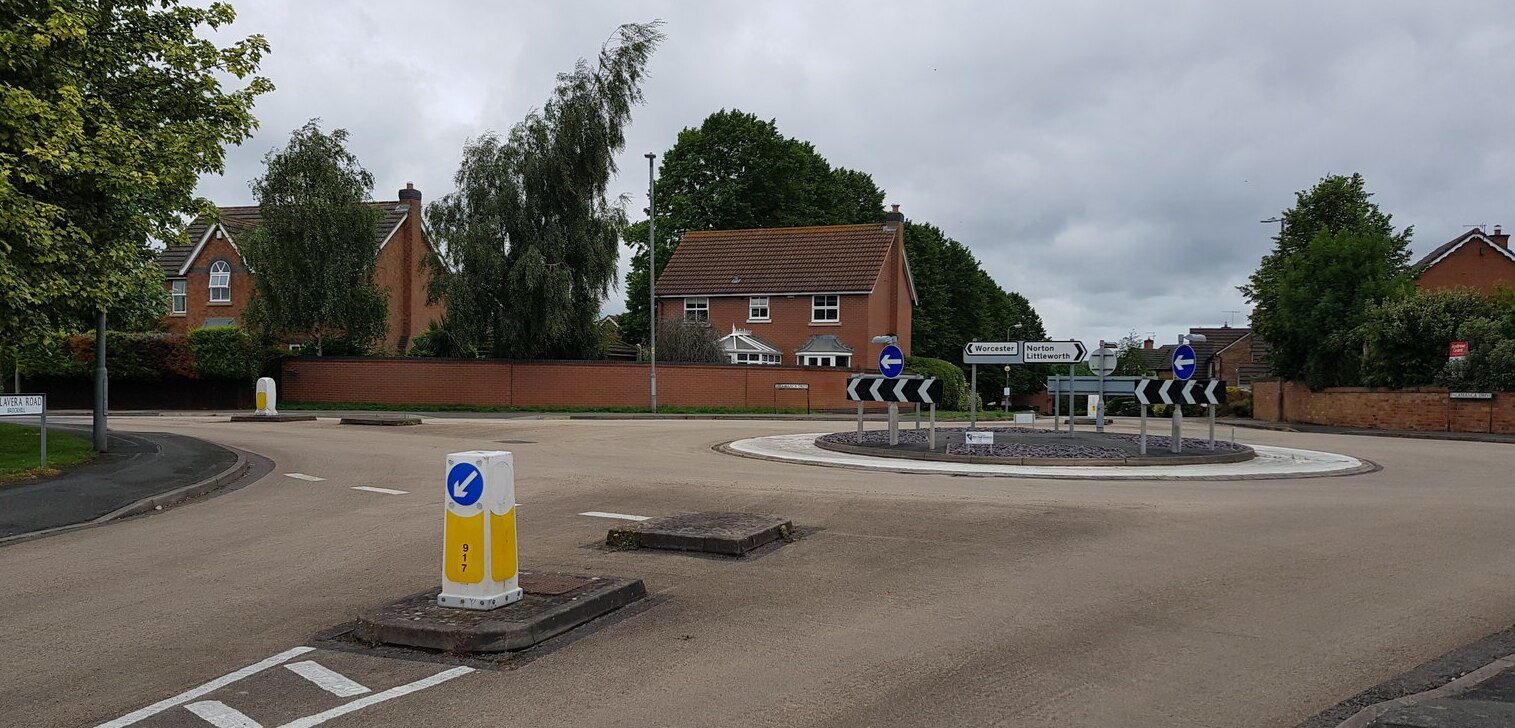
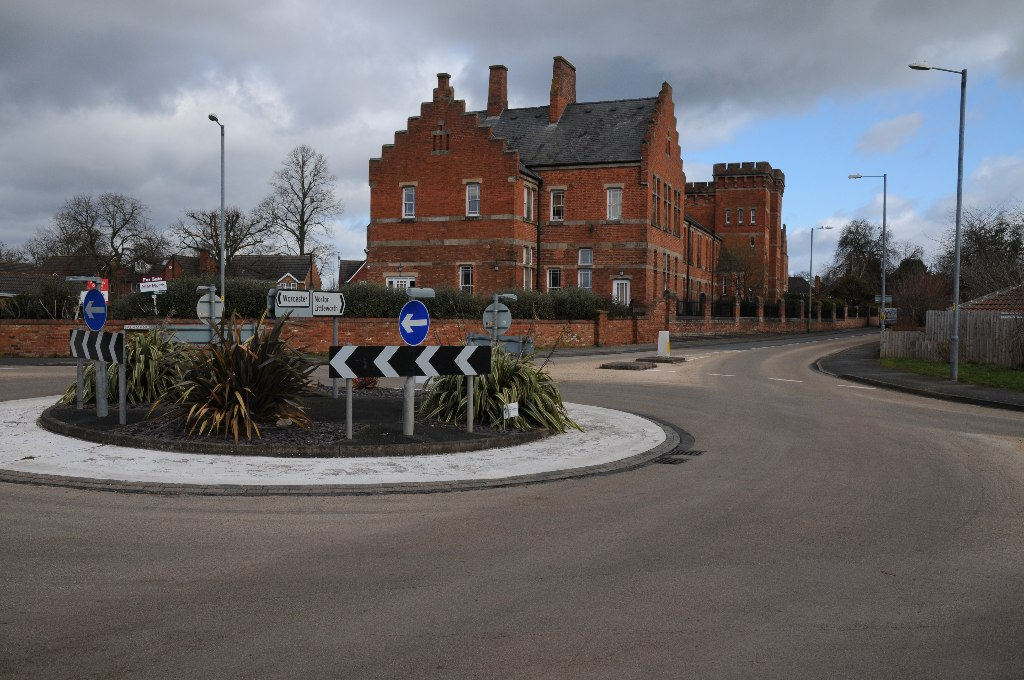
Norton Barracks, the location Cannan's former girlfriend recounted Cannan as saying was the location Lamplugh was buried, has been heavily built upon in the intervening years, with only the main keep building remaining (pictured in second image). This has prevented any extensive digs being made at the site.

Based on the evidence, police began a search for Lamplugh's body. Investigators wanted to dig at Norton Barracks, where Cannan had allegedly told former girlfriend Gilly Paige that the body was buried and which was identified by an anonymous informant in 1999. The area had been significantly redeveloped in the intervening years. However, the British Army left the site in 1979 and investigators were not able to dig in the area because of residential housing now standing there.

Detectives considered the possibility that the SLP 386S number plate that Cannan had attached to Banks' car could be an ordnance survey grid reference, as this would provide a location very close to Dead Woman's Ditch, where Banks was found dumped. Cannan was known to play such tricks with investigators, and it was believed that, if his decision to dump Banks's body in Dead Woman's Ditch was intentional, the letters and numbers on the plate could have been as well. As a result, investigators searched the area, but Lamplugh's body was not found.

In December 2000, police searched a brickworks near Norton Barracks that had been mentioned in several of the original witness statements. A year later, another search was conducted in Somerset at a location by a river that Cannan was said to have frequented. However, no remains were found.

=== Cannan announced as murderer ===
"My informed theory is that Suzy was stalked by John Cannan. He probably spoke to her, might even have taken her on a date. Suzy certainly fitted the profile of what John Cannan sought, in that she was blonde, attractive, worked at an estate agent, a very presentable young lady who came from a good family. Little doubt that Cannan stalked her, little doubt that Cannan viewed properties with her, that he observed her through the windows of the estate agents which probably drew him to go in and seek to view properties. I think that Suzy got into a row with Cannan on the day, he abducted her from the car, or made her get into the vehicle he had at the time. There then ensued probably quite a very heated row where he basically drove off abducting her. Where he went from there is a matter of conjecture."

— Jim Dickie, 2015. Dickie was the SIO (senior investigating officer) on the Lamplugh reinvestigative team between 2000 and 2006.

The Lamplugh reinvestigation team concluded that there was significant evidence against Cannan to apply for a prosecution. The Crown Prosecution Service (CPS) agreed that the police reinvestigation had been excellent and thorough, but ultimately decided after four months of deliberations that there was insufficient evidence to charge Cannan with the murder. Police so strongly felt that Cannan was responsible that they proclaimed such during a press conference in November 2002. They also announced that all other possible suspects had been eliminated and that Cannan was their prime suspect. The lead detective in the reinvestigations, Jim Dickie, stated that he was as certain as possible without conducting a formal judicial process that Cannan was responsible.

In 2007, a criminologist who had corresponded with Cannan revealed that the police reinvestigations of 2000–2002 had discovered DNA evidence in a car previously owned by Cannan that showed that Lamplugh had been inside the vehicle. The criminologist informed police that Cannan said that he had access to a red Ford Sierra at the time when Lamplugh disappeared, a fact about which police were previously unaware. Detectives attempted to find the car and discovered it in a North London scrapyard, allowing them to conduct DNA analysis upon it.

Although these tests indicated that both Lamplugh and Cannan had been in the car, the CPS felt that there was insufficient evidence to prove that both had been in the vehicle at the same time, meaning charges could not be brought against Cannan. Although he previously had said he drove the car often, Cannan subsequently changed his story and denied ever having used the vehicle, but the man who had lent it to Cannan confirmed that he had access to the car and said that Cannan may have used it on the day Lamplugh disappeared.

=== Links to Sandra Court murder ===
When interviewed about Lamplugh's disappearance in 1988, Cannan had said that he knew a "Bristol businessman" who was responsible for "the murders of Shirley Banks, Suzy Lamplugh and another girl." Investigators believe that he was talking about himself, as he was previously convicted of Banks's murder. The other girl that he mentioned is believed to be Sandra Court, a 27-year-old office worker who was abducted and killed in Bournemouth in May 1986. In November 2001, police interviewed Cannan at a police station in York regarding Court's murder. He had been in the prison hostel at Wormwood Scrubs at the time but was allowed to leave the facility at weekends and had access to a red Ford Sierra, the same car that was tested in the Lamplugh case.

Court had been dropped off by a taxi driver in Throop, Dorset, near her sister's house after a night out, but her sister was not at home. Court was last seen walking barefoot, appearing slightly drunk, at around 2:45 a.m. Her body was found the next day in a water-filled ditch several miles away. When interviewed, Cannan denied having been in Bournemouth on the day in question but was proved to be lying because of the parking tickets discovered by police.

When the Ford Sierra was discovered during the Lamplugh reinvestigations of the early 2000s, two hairs were found inside that matched Court's DNA. However, the DNA evidence was not strong enough to bring a prosecution against Cannan for her murder.

== Steve Wright speculation and elimination ==
In 1982, Lamplugh had worked as a beautician on the ocean liner Queen Elizabeth 2 (QE2). At the same time, Steve Wright, who was convicted in February 2008 of the murders of five women in Ipswich in late 2006, was working as a steward on the same vessel. In 2008, the Metropolitan Police investigated whether Wright was connected with Lamplugh's disappearance, but this was not a strong line of enquiry and a senior police officer described the link as "speculative." Police investigated Wright's QE2 work records and found that he was working on the ship on the day that Lamplugh disappeared, meaning that he could not have been responsible for her abduction and murder.

== Later searches ==
In August 2010, police began searching a field off the B4084 between Pershore and Drakes Broughton, about three miles from the former Norton Barracks where detectives had wanted to search in 2000. Investigators also returned to Norton Barracks and subjected it to a limited search, but Lamplugh's remains were not found.

In December 2002, one of Cannan's fellow prisoners told police that he had said he had buried Lamplugh under the patio of his mother's house in Sutton Coldfield in the West Midlands. In late October 2018, police searched the house. They dismantled the garage and began removing its concrete floor whilst also searching the back garden. On 12 November 2018, police announced that the search had yielded no evidence.

In July 2019, a police search of land in Pershore, with the assistance of archaeologists, produced no relevant evidence.

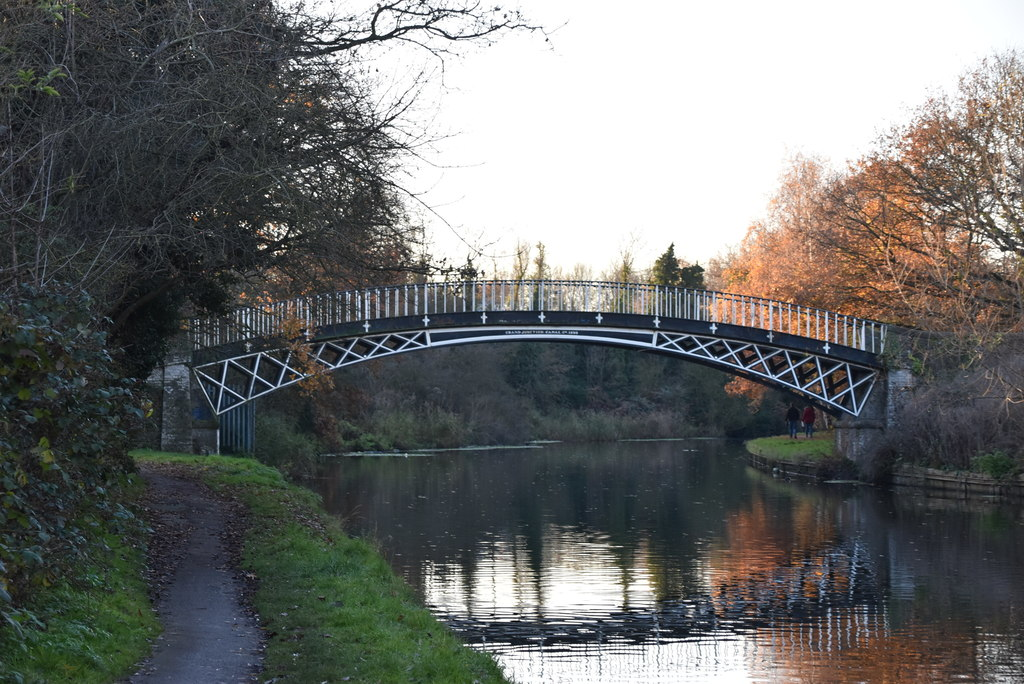
Gallows Bridge, Brentford Canal, Grand Union Canal where an eyewitness saw a man resembling Cannan push a suitcase in

In August 2019, the Specialist Investigation Team was informed of the sighting of a man resembling Cannan dumping a suitcase in the Grand Union Canal around 5am on 31 July 1986. However, this section of the canal was previously searched in September 2014 for an unrelated inquiry. The canal sighting was covered in the documentaries The Vanishing of Suzy Lamplugh and In the Footsteps of Killers.

== Current status ==
Cannan remained the prime (and only) suspect in the case, and he falsely claimed that the Metropolitan Police had eliminated him as a suspect. He protested his innocence not only of involvement in Lamplugh's disappearance but of nearly all other crimes for which he had been convicted, including those that were proven with DNA links and fingerprint evidence. This included the rape of the woman in Reading for which forensic evidence showed the chances of the perpetrator being anyone other than Cannan were 260 million to one.

While in prison, Cannan told a solicitor that he might well "reveal all" about Lamplugh when his mother died. However, in 2020, Cannan's brother revealed that his sister had already unsuccessfully begged him to reveal the location of Lamplugh's body; further, the brother had insisted that he would "take his secrets to the grave" because he "doesn't have a modicum of regret, conscience or compassion" and is "a power freak." Criminologist Christopher Berry-Dee, who exchanged hundreds of letters with Cannan while writing a book on him, has also said that Cannan would not reveal where he deposited the body, as Cannan is a "control freak." Fellow criminologist David Wilson agreed and said that Cannan would not confess because he was a psychopath.

Cannan was eligible for parole in 2022. His first parole hearing was scheduled for March 2023 but was postponed until October of that year. Cannan's parole bid was denied and he remained in prison. Cannan died in Full Sutton Prison on 6 November 2024. Further police investigation and appeal was made in 2026.

== Suzy Lamplugh Trust ==
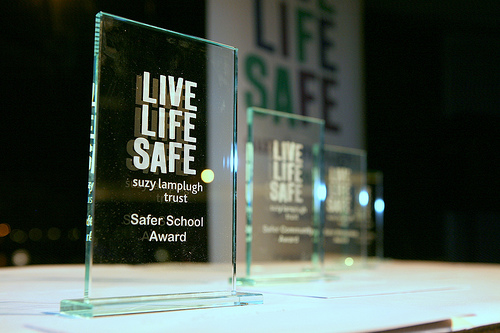
The National Safety Awards are held by the Suzy Lamplugh Trust annually.

The Suzy Lamplugh Trust is a charitable foundation established in December 1986 by Lamplugh's parents, Paul and Diana Lamplugh. In 1992, their younger daughter Elizabeth Lamplugh escaped an attempted abduction and Anthony Bourgois was later convicted. The mission of the trust is to raise awareness of personal safety through training and various projects, to help people avoid aggression and to offer counselling and support to relatives and friends of missing people. The trust runs the UK's National Stalking Helpline.

Paul and Diana Lamplugh were appointed to OBE in 1992 and 2005, respectively, for their charitable work with the Suzy Lamplugh Trust. Diana Lamplugh died in August 2011 at the age of 75, and Paul Lamplugh died at the age of 87 in June 2018. Rachel Griffin, CEO of the trust since 2012, died of cancer in August 2019.

== Commemorative window ==
Lamplugh and her family were members of the congregation at All Saints Church, East Sheen, in the London Borough of Richmond upon Thames. She is commemorated there in a stained-glass window that was installed in 1996.

== Television documentaries ==
External videos
- YouTube videos
- In the Footsteps of Killers Series 1 Episode 2

Lamplugh's disappearance has been the subject of a number of documentaries:

- On 16 August 1989, a Crimewatch File documentary on John Cannan's conviction for the murder of Shirley Banks was aired. It also noted the suggestions of a possible link between Cannan and the Lamplugh murder. Cannan tried unsuccessfully to prevent the programme's broadcast.
- On 12 September 2001, a Real Crime documentary was aired on ITV that examined the Lamplugh case. It was concluded that Cannan was likely responsible for her murder.
- In 2002, a documentary titled The Man Who Killed Suzy Lamplugh? was aired on Channel 5. It concluded that Cannan was likely responsible for her murder.
- In 2015, a Crimes That Shook Britain documentary aired that focused on the Lamplugh case. It concluded that Cannan was likely responsible for her murder.
- In December 2020, a documentary titled The Vanishing of Suzy Lamplugh aired on Channel 5. It concluded that Cannan was likely responsible for her murder.
- On 9 March 2021, a two-part Sky TV documentary titled The Suzy Lamplugh Mystery/The Mystery of Suzy Lamplugh was aired. It concluded that Cannan was likely responsible for her murder.
- On 16 June 2021, an episode of Channel 4 and criminologist David Wilson's documentary series In the Footsteps of Killers aired, focusing on Lamplugh's case. It concluded that Cannan was likely responsible for her murder.
- On 2 October 2021, an episode of Faking It: Tears of a Crime called "The Prime Suspect" went into detail of the mistakes made by John Cannan that caused him to be considered a suspect in Lamplugh's disappearance.

== See also ==
- List of people who disappeared mysteriously (1980s)
- Murder of Lindsay Buziak – the 2008 murder of a real estate agent in Canada after she met clients about whom she had expressed concerns
- Murder of Helen McCourt – high-profile UK case in which the murderer refused to disclose the location of the victim's body before he died in 2022 which led to the introduction of Helen's Law
- Murder of Lindsay Rimer – unsolved 1994 case of a British girl who disappeared in Yorkshire and whose body was found six months later in a nearby canal
- Murder of Carolanne Jackson – an unsolved 1997 UK murder that is believed to have involved stalking
- Murder of Yanfei Bao – 2023 killing of a real estate agent in New Zealand
