= SARbot UK =

- Type: Charity
- Purpose: Search and rescue
- Website: www.sarbot.org.uk

SARbot UK is an underwater search and rescue charity based in the United Kingdom. They can be called to assist the emergency services who are unable to perform rescues below the water's surface. These services often have to call for divers who do not operate on an immediate response system. Where available the SARbot team aim to be on the scene and searching underwater within 90 minutes. Within this time it remains possible to resuscitate a person. The organisation hopes to set up bases across the country to cover a wider area.

== Technology ==
The robots used by the charity are remote controlled and feature sophisticated image enhancers that, according to the operators, can give "a 120 meter view in zero visibility". The robots are capable of pulling a body out of the water using a grabbing arm. Some of the equipment is on loan from Seabotix. Each robot costs up to £140,000.

== Underwater search dogs ==
A recent collaboration with International Rescue Training Centre Wales (IRTCW) has seen the introduction of search dogs capable of detecting the presence of human remains underwater. The dogs work from a boat and sniff the water; they are able to detect the scent of human remains and indicate to the handler. The handler then calls in SARbot to perform the recovery.

== Notable searches ==
The charity assisted the Metropolitan Police in their search for murdered EastEnders actress Gemma McCluskie. They were called in to help divers search around 600 metres (2,000 ft) of the Regent's Canal in Hackney where parts of her body had been found. This was the first case of such underwater robots being used in London.

In April 2012 the charity were called to assist West Midlands Police and Fire Service, after a 5-hour search in a lake at Sutton Park, Birmingham by divers and swift water rescue technicians SARbot were asked to assist. Upon arrival the robot was deployed and the team discovered the body within 10 minutes.

SARbot also assisted in the search for Sascha Schornstein, a pilot who crashed in the English Channel in July 2013. Schornstein was flying from Hampshire to Le Touquet in a light aircraft when it crashed into the water. Initial reports suggest that this was attempt to fake his own death. A number of volunteers from SARbot hired a catamaran and used their equipment to search for any signs of Schornstein's body. They identified the crash site and the robots have taken images of what is believed to be the plane's fuselage, with a more detailed search needed to confirm the possible presence of a body.

The team were also called to assist in the 2012 search for April Jones.

SARBOT searched for Dylan Cecil in the Bristol channel in August 2012, where they claimed that Dylan was "certainly not in the bay.”. the body of Dylan Cecil was recovered approximately 300 metres from where he disappeared a few days later.
