= Crimes That Shook Britain =

- Genre: Documentary
- Starring: Dermot Murnaghan
- Narrated by: Tom Roberts
- Country of origin: United Kingdom
- Original language: English
- No. of series: 9
- No. of episodes: 48

Production
- Executive producer: Helen Tonge
- Producers: Nick Broughall; Helen Tonge
- Editor: Paul Mclntyre
- Production company: Title Role Productions

Original release
- Network: Crime & Investigation UK
- Release: 20 September 2008 – present

Crimes That Shook Britain is a television series first aired in 2008 on Crime & Investigation UK, focusing on uncovering the truth behind crimes that shocked the nation. Some episodes were also rebroadcast in random episode order from 2014 to 2019, on Channel 5 originally under the title Britain's Worst Crimes.

Through drama reconstructions, witness accounts, interviews with police and the victims families, the series explores some of Britain's most infamous cases and murderers.

== Episodes ==
=== Series 1 (2008) ===
1. The Hungerford massacre; in August 1987, 27-year-old Michael Ryan shot dead 16 people (including his elderly mother) in the Berkshire town of Hungerford before turning the gun on himself.
2. Harold Shipman; in January 2000, 54-year-old Greater Manchester GP Harold Shipman was convicted of murdering 15 patients between 1995 and 1998; a government inquiry later found that in total, he killed more than 200 people while practising in Greater Manchester and North Yorkshire.
3. Stephanie Slater; Birmingham estate agent Stephanie Slater is abducted and held hostage in January 1992, with her abductor demanding ransom money for her release, before she is set free a week later. Michael Sams is arrested soon afterwards and 18 months later is jailed for life for the abduction and false imprisonment of Miss Slater, as well as the murder of 18-year-old Leeds prostitute Julie Dart in July 1991.
4. The Russell Murders; in July 1996, Lin Russell and her six-year-old daughter Megan are bludgeoned to death in a Kent country lane. Mrs Russell's other daughter, nine-year-old Josie, suffers serious head injuries but survives. Two years later, 38-year-old drug addict and psychopath Michael Stone is found guilty of the murders and sentenced to life imprisonment. Stone's convictions were quashed in 2001 and he was granted a re-trial, but was convicted of the murders at his second trial.
5. Beverley Allitt; in 1991, four young children died and nine others were attacked (some of them suffering serious and life changing health issues or disabilities) at a Lincolnshire hospital. Staff nurse Beverley Allitt is arrested and charged with the murders and other attacks. She is found guilty in May 1993 and sentenced to life imprisonment in a psychiatric hospital.
6. Murder of Sarah Payne; in July 2000, an eight-year-old girl goes missing while playing with her siblings near her grandfather's seaside home in West Sussex. A police manhunt is launched and media appeals for her safe return are made, but 16 days later a body is found in another part of the county and is soon identified as that of Sarah. The discovery of Sarah's body sees a murder inquiry launched, while Sarah's family co-operate with the national media - mostly the News of the World - for public access to the sex offender's register, as well as more severe sentences for anyone found guilty of sexual offences against children. Roy Whiting, a local man with a previous conviction for child abduction and indecent assault, is found guilty of the murder in December 2001 and sentenced to life imprisonment with a recommendation that he should never be released.

=== Series 2 (2011) ===
1. The London Nail Bombings; in the spring of 1999, three nail bomb attacks in London killed three people and injured 140 others. David Copeland, a neo-Nazi extremist, was arrested soon afterwards and found guilty the following year, being sentenced to life imprisonment.
2. The Murder of Jill Dando; TV presenter shot dead on her West London doorstep in April 1999. Barry George was found guilty of her murder in 2001 and sentenced to life imprisonment, but was released in 2008 after winning an appeal against his conviction.
3. The Dunblane Massacre; the fatal shooting of 16 children and their teacher at a primary school in Dunblane, Scotland, by local man Thomas Hamilton, who then shot himself dead. The massacre contributed to stiffer gun laws, as well as tighter security in schools.
4. The White House Farm murders; the bodies of Nevill and June Bamber, along with their adoptive daughter Sheila and six-year-old twin grandsons, are found dead from gunshot wounds at the family's Essex farmhouse. The shootings are initially treated by the police and reported by the media as a murder-suicide, as Sheila had a history of psychiatric illness. However, the couple's surviving adopted child, 24-year-old son Jeremy, is soon arrested and charged with the murders, with his cousin and former girlfriend both informing police that he had told them of his plans to carry out the killings in order to inherit a six-figure fortune. He is tried for the murders a year later, found guilty and jailed for life.
5. The Murder of Rhys Jones; an 11-year-old boy who died in Liverpool after being hit by a stray bullet near his home in August 2007. Local teenage gang member Sean Mercer was found guilty of his murder more than a year later and sentenced to life imprisonment with a recommended minimum term of 22 years.
6. The Murder of Stephen Cameron; a 21-year-old man who was stabbed to death by another motorist on the M25 in a "road rage" incident, in front of his 17-year-old girlfriend. Kenneth Noye is found guilty of the murder.

=== Series 3 (2012) ===
1. The murder of Victoria Climbié; eight-year-old Victoria Climbie died in February 2000 following a campaign of horrendous abuse at the hands of her aunt and her aunt's partner in North London, where she was being raised by her relative under the wishes of her parents, who felt that she would have a better education in England than in her native Ivory Coast.
2. The Omagh Bombing; in August 1998, a terrorist bomb explodes in the Northern Ireland town of Omagh, killing 29 people (including a pregnant woman) and injuring many others. A Republican terrorist organisation calling themselves the "Real IRA" later claims responsibility for the atrocity.
3. The "Crossbow Cannibal" (Stephen Griffiths); between June 2009 and May 2010, three women are brutally murdered in Bradford, West Yorkshire. 41-year-old local man Stephen Griffiths is then arrested and admits the murders at his trial in December that year. He is sentenced to life imprisonment with a recommendation that he should never be released.
4. The murder of James Bulger; On 12 February 1993, 2 year old James went missing at a Merseyside shopping centre. His mutilated body was found on a railway line two days later. A CCTV image shows James being led away by two older boys, which quickly leads the police to two 10-year-old local boys, Robert Thompson and Jon Venables. They were soon charged with the murder on 20 February 1993. The two boys were found guilty of the murder nine months later and were sentenced to be detained for "very, very many years". They were paroled with new identities eight years later, but in 2010 one of the killers Jon Venables, by now in his late twenties, was recalled to prison for breaching his licence conditions after being found possessing child pornography.
5. The murder of Sally Anne Bowman; in September 2005, 18-year-old Croydon model Sally Anne Bowman is found dead outside her home; she had been stabbed and raped. Mark Dixie, who was caught nearly a year later through a DNA match after he was arrested for an unrelated crime, was found guilty of the murder in February 2008 and jailed for life with a recommended minimum term of 34 years. After his trial, it was revealed that Dixie had previous convictions for sexual offences against women, and his name has since been linked with other unsolved sexual offences.
6. The Murder of Rachel Nickell; in July 1992, 23-year-old Rachel Nickell is stabbed to death on Wimbledon Common in front of her two-year-old son. Colin Stagg is charged with her murder a year later, but is later acquitted, after it is revealed that an undercover policewoman had been employed by the Metropolitan Police to win Stagg's trust in an attempt to get him to confess to the murder. The crime was finally solved in December 2008 when Robert Napper admitted the manslaughter of Rachel Nickell at the Old Bailey and sentenced to be detained indefinitely in a mental hospital. He had already been in custody for 15 years for stabbing to death a young mother and suffocating her young daughter in South London in November 1993; 16 months after killing Rachel Nickell.

=== Series 4 (2013) ===
1. The Murder of Stephen Lawrence; in 1993, 18-year-old South London student Stephen Lawrence is stabbed to death after being attacked by a gang of youths. Two local teenagers, Neil Acourt and Luke Knight, are accused of the murder, but the charges are later dropped, with the police and CPS citing a lack of evidence. A third suspect, Gary Dobson, is also arrested but not charged. However, a change in the law a decade later enables a suspect to be re-tried for a crime they have been cleared of, in the event of new evidence coming to light. In November 2011, Gary Dobson and David Norris, by now in their late thirties, go on trial for the murder of Stephen Lawrence, and are found guilty of murder in January 2012. They are sentenced to life imprisonment. Witnessed stated that there were at least five people involved in the murder, but nobody else has yet been charged.
2. Raoul Moat; freed prisoner Raoul Moat goes on a shooting spree in North East England almost as soon as he is freed from a prison sentence for assault. He begins his spree at the home of his former girlfriend Samantha Stobart, causing her serious injuries and killing her new boyfriend Christopher Brown. He later shoots PC David Rathband, blinding him, and is later surrounded by the police. Moat is still armed, and police spend several hours negotiating with him before he shoots himself dead. His two accomplices, initially believed to be hostages, are later jailed for life after being found guilty of murder and two counts of attempted murder.
3. Garry Newlove; a 47-year-old father-of-three dies in August 2007 after being attacked by a gang of teenagers outside his home in Warrington, Cheshire, the culmination of a long-running campaign of anti-social behaviour in the locality. Nine teenagers are quickly arrested; five of them are charged with murder. Three are convicted of the murder five months later and receive life sentences with recommended minimum terms of between 12 and 17 years. In the months and years that follow, his widow is actively involved in campaigning against the type of youth gang crime (often drink or drug fuelled) which has resulted in serious crimes like the death of her husband, and is later elevated to the House of Lords, as well as being appointed Victim's Commissioner by the Conservative government.
4. The Yorkshire Ripper; between 1975 and 1980, 13 women are killed and seven others injured in attacks across the county of West Yorkshire (and two victims in Manchester). After the first few attacks, police are convinced that they are dealing with the crimes of one man, a mystery individual who is labelled by the media as the "Yorkshire Ripper". Their hunt comes to an end on 2 January 1981 when 34-year-old Bradford lorry driver Peter Sutcliffe is arrested in Sheffield for driving with false number plates and confesses to the crimes. He is jailed for life later that year.
5. Christopher Foster; in August 2008, the charred bodies of businessman Christopher Foster, his wife Jill and their teenage daughter Kirstie are found after a fire at their £1.2million Shropshire mansion. It is later established that Mr Foster had shot his wife and daughter dead, as well as their dogs and horses, before setting fire to their home and dying in the inferno. Further investigations that Christopher Foster was more than £4 million in debt and may have committed the murder-suicide to save his family from experiencing poverty that would have resulted from his bankruptcy and loss of their home.
6. Colin Ireland; five homosexual men are brutally murdered across London in the space of three months in 1993. 39-year-old Colin Ireland is soon arrested and admits all of the murders at his trial six months later. Branded the "Gay Slayer" by the tabloid media, he is jailed for life and remained in prison until his death in February 2012.

=== Series 5 (2014) ===
1. Jimmy Savile; the veteran British TV presenter and entertainer Jimmy Savile died in October 2011 at the age of 84. A year later, following an ITV documentary featuring interviews with women who claimed to have been sexually assaulted by Savile many years earlier. Over the next few months, hundreds more people claim to have been abused by Savile during the last 50 years, while others claim to have witnessing him carrying out sexual assaults. His victims were mostly children and vulnerable adults, and a police inquiry establishes that Savile was one of the most prolific sex offenders in Britain; and that police received several complaints about Savile's behaviour, but he was never fully investigated. "Operation Yewtree" also resulted in the arrests of many other celebrities following claims of historical sexual abuse. Several high-profile individuals, including Rolf Harris and Max Clifford, were found guilty of various offences committed as long ago as the 1960s. Others, including Coronation Street actors William Roache and Michael Le Vell were cleared in court, while Jim Davidson was also arrested over allegations of sexual abuse but was cleared of any wrongdoing without being charged.
2. The Murder of Lee Rigby; in May 2013, British soldier Lee Rigby is run over and butchered to death near the Woolwich barracks in South London where he is stationed. Two men in their twenties are arrested at the scene and charged with murder. The two men, both Islamic converts, are later sentenced to life imprisonment.
3. Fred and Rose West; in February 1994, police call at the Gloucester home of 52-year-old builder Fred West, investigating the disappearance of his daughter Heather, who was last seen alive in 1987 at the age of 16. They were already familiar with Fred West, having investigated him 18 months earlier for the alleged rape of another teenage daughter. Within weeks, police find the bodies of Heather West and seven other women and girls buried at the house. Fred is charged with the murders, and by the end of April the police have also arrested his wife Rosemary and charged her with the murders. Police had also discovered that Fred's first wife Rena and eight-year-old daughter Charmaine had both disappeared in the early 1970s without being reported missing. Rena's body was soon found buried in a local field, and Charmaine's was buried at the West's previous home in Midland Road, Gloucester. Fred was eventually charged with a total of 12 murders, and Rose with 10 murders. Fred committed suicide on remand at Winson Green Prison in Birmingham on 1 January 1995, and Rose went on trial that autumn at Winchester Crown Court. She was found guilty of all 10 murders and sentenced to life imprisonment with a recommendation that she should never be released. At Rose's trial, police heard from a former lodger of the Wests, who told of the sexual abuse that she had suffered at their hands - and for which they had actually both been convicted - two decades earlier. During police questioning, Fred West admitted that he had committed around 30 murders since the 1960s, but police have so far been unable to establish a link between the Wests and any other unsolved murders or disappearances, even though the tabloid media have been to speculate over the years that various other missing women may have fallen victim to the pair.
4. Mick and Mairead Philpott; in May 2012, a fire at a council house in Derby killed six of a couple's 17 children. The children who died were aged between five and 13 years. Within days, police establish that the fire was deliberate, and begin a murder investigation. Two weeks later, the parents of the dead children, Mick and Mairead Philpott are arrested and charged with murder. Six months later, family friend Paul Mosley is also arrested and charged with the murders. The charges are later reduced to manslaughter after the police investigation establishes that the fire was not started with the intention of causing death. In April 2013, all three defendants were found guilty of manslaughter. Mick Philpott received a life sentence, and the other two defendants were both jailed for 17 years.
5. The Marchioness Disaster; on 20 August 1989, the Marchioness, a hired pleasure boat dating from 1923, collided with a dredger on the River Thames in central London. 51 people are drowned. Two years later, the dredger's captain is prosecuted for failing to keep a proper lookout on the boat, but is cleared. In April 1995, an inquest records a verdict of unlawful killing on the 51 people who were killed, but nobody has ever been successfully prosecuted over the tragedy.
6. Clare Wood; a 36-year-old Salford woman meets a 40-year-old man on a dating site. He is George Appleton. They begin a serious relationship, but he soon becomes violent towards her; she is unaware that he has a lengthy history of violence, and once held a former girlfriend at knifepoint. The police are called several times as George Appleton is violent towards Clare Wood, and a panic alarm is installed at her house. In February 2009, nearly two years after they first met, Clare Wood is found dead at her house. George Appleton is identified as the prime suspect, but is found dead in a derelict building six days later. The case sparks calls for adults to have a legal right to know if their partner has any convictions for violent or sexual offences.

=== Series 6 (2015) ===
1. Rolf Harris; in March 2013, 83-year-old veteran entertainer and TV presenter Rolf Harris is arrested for historical sexual offences, as part of "Operation Yewtree" which stemmed from the allegations against the late Jimmy Savile. 15 months later, he is found guilty on 12 charges of incident assault between 1968 and 1986, and sentenced to almost six years in prison.
2. The murder of April Jones; in October 2012, five-year-old April Jones goes missing near her home in Mid Wales. Within a week, local man Mark Bridger is charged with her murder, even though her body has not been found. Bridger goes on trial for murder seven months later and confessed to causing her death by hitting her with his car when drunk, although he claims to have buried her body in a panic and could not remember where he had buried it. The jury rejects his claims and he is sentenced to life imprisonment with a recommendation that he is never released. At his trial, it was revealed that he had accessed child pornography on his computer just hours before April Jones went missing. Police were able to conclude that April Jones had been murdered due to the presence of bone fragments and blood in Bridger's house, which convinced them that she had suffered non-survivable injuries and that her body may have been dismembered before being disposed of.
3. Dale Cregan; in September 2012, 29-year-old one-eyed Dale Cregan walked into a Greater Manchester police station and confessed to murdering two policewomen who had responded to a hoax call at a house in Mottram. He had reported a false incident of vandalism at the house, and when the officers responded he fired gunshots and hurled grenades at them. Cregan was also wanted by the police for the murders of Mark Short at a Droylsden pub in May that year, and of the murder of Mark Short's father David at his home in Clayton 10 weeks later; both men were shot. Cregan admitted all four murders at his trial in May 2013. He was sentenced to life imprisonment and the judge recommended that he should never be released. Cregan was initially held in a mainstream prison, but within a few months he had been transferred to a mental hospital.
4. Angus Sinclair; in October 1977, two teenage girls are murdered after being seen at a pub in Edinburgh, Scotland. 30 years later, 62-year-old Angus Sinclair – a two-time convicted sexual murderer and separately convicted serial rapist – is tried for the murders and cleared. However, a change in the law which enables someone to be re-tried for a crime if new evidences comes to light sees Sinclair re-tried for the murders seven years afterwards. He is sentenced to life imprisonment with a recommended minimum term of 37 years, which meant that he was unlikely ever to be released unless he lived to be at least 106 years old. Sinclair died in prison in 2019 at the age of 73.
5. Moors murders; in October 1965, following the murder of 17-year-old Edward Evans at a house in Hattersley, near Manchester, police are led to Saddleworth Moor, where it is believed that the bodies of missing local children and teenagers are buried. Within two weeks, they find the bodies of 10-year-old Lesley Ann Downey (who had gone missing from Ancoats nearly a year earlier) and 12-year-old John Kilbride (who disappeared from Ashton-under-Lyne in November 1963). Ian Brady and his girlfriend Myra Hindley are charged with the murders. They go on trial six months later, and the jury hears a 16-minute tape recording of Lesley Ann Downey being attacked before she was killed, and also see photographs of the girl stripped, gagged and bound. They also see a photograph of Myra Hindley standing on recently disturbed land, identified as the burial site of John Kilbride's body - the child's name was also mentioned in a notebook belonging to Ian Brady. The pair are found guilty of the murders and sentenced to life imprisonment. 20 years later, they confess to the murders of two more missing children - 16-year-old Pauline Reade (their first victim, who vanished in July 1963) and Keith Bennett (missing since June 1964). They return to the moors and guide police to the body of Pauline Reade, but the body of Keith Bennett is never found. Brady is by now in a mental hospital and declares that he never wants to be considered for parole, but Hindley is campaigning for release, despite strong public and media opposition to her being granted parole. The likes of Lord Longford support Hindley's campaign and claim that she is a reformed character who no longer poses any risk to society, but a succession of Home Secretaries decide that a life sentence must mean life for Hindley. She makes three appeals against her sentence, but each appeal is rejected and she remains in prison until her death in November 2002. Brady died at the mental hospital where he was being detained in 2017, at the age of 79.
6. Suzy Lamplugh; 25-year-old West London estate agent Suzy Lamplugh goes missing in July 1986 after leaving her office to show a property to a prospective buyer. The name "Mr Kipper" (inevitably a nickname or false name) appears in Miss Lamplugh's notebook, but police investigations fail to identify the true identity of the man, or whether he was responsible for her disappearance. It soon becomes apparent that the chances of her still being alive are slim, and she is legally declared dead in 1994, despite no body being found. More than 30 years on, the mystery of her disappearance remains unsolved, despite ongoing inquiries and various different suspects (many of them convicted sex offenders or murderers) being named and investigated.

=== Series 7 (2017) ===
1. Wrongly Released: Ernest Wright, Roy Whiting, Donald Andrews
2. Rochdale Groomers: In Rochdale, a town in Greater Manchester, a British Pakistani sex trafficking gang have been in operation for almost 8 years at the time of the gang's dismantling by police in 2009. The subsequent investigation, which didn't commence until 2014, is punctuated by the discovery of a series of systematic failures and miscarriages of justice that allowed the gang to carry out their crimes unchallenged; the ethnicity of the group is also brought into question, as all of the victims were White British, leading some to question whether authorities turned a blind eye for fear of being accused of racial prejudice.
3. Joanne Dennehy
4. Keith Blakelock: During the riot at Broadwater Farm on 6 October 1985, The London Fire Brigade and a detachment of police officers, Serial 502, who are not equipped for crowd control flee a far larger group of rioters. When PC Keith Blakelock trips and falls, he is set upon by armed attackers and viciously hacked to death with machetes. His death marks the third time a police officer died during a riot since 1833. Two years later, six individuals are charged with Blakelock's murder, with additional suspects being investigated for their role in the attack in the years that followed.
5. Peter Tobin
6. John Sweeney

=== Series 8 (2017) ===
1. Manchester Arena Bombing: As a concert at the Manchester Arena by American artist Ariana Grande comes to a close, an Islamic terrorist detonates a shrapnel-laden homemade bomb, killing 23 people including himself, and injuring 1,017 others.
2. Ann Maguire: On 28 April 2014, Ann Maguire, a teacher at Corpus Christi Catholic College, is stabbed to death by one of her students, William Cormick, who was just 15 years old at the time.
3. Gemma McCluskie
4. Stepping Hill: When a series of patient deaths under suspicious circumstances are reported at Stepping Hill Hospital in Stockport, police initially suspect a nurse, Rebecca Leighton, may be behind the deaths. However, after Leighton is removed from her position, the deaths continue, and a second nurse, Victorino Chua, is found guilty of the murders after Leighton's case collapses.
5. Suffolk Strangler
6. Stephen Port

=== Series 9 (2024) ===
1. Elle Edwards
2. Reading Stabbings
3. XL Bullies
4. Shakira Spencer
5. Brianna Ghey
6. Lee Pomeroy
7. Kasim Lewis
8. Sophie Lancaster

== See also ==
- Most Evil Killers
