= Mark Dixie =

British serial rapist and murderer

- Born: Mark Philip Dixie; 24 September 1970 (age 56); Streatham, London, UK
- Other names: Mark Down; Mark McDonald; Steven McDonald; Shane Turner
- Occupation: Former Chef
- Children: 3
- Conviction: Murder
- Penalty: Life imprisonment with a minimum term of 34 years

Mark Philip Dixie (born 24 September 1970) is a British serial rapist and murderer who was convicted on 22 February 2008 of murdering 18-year-old singer and model Sally Anne Bowman on 25 September 2005 in South Croydon, London. He has 17 other criminal convictions. He was known by various pseudonyms.

== Early life ==
Dixie was born in Streatham, South London. His parents separated when he was 18 months old. When he was eight, his mother remarried; she had two sons by her new husband. Dixie admits to having been a heavy drinker and user of cannabis and cocaine for years.

== Criminal record and deportation ==
Dixie has a long criminal record. His first conviction was for robbery – he mugged a woman at knifepoint in Stockwell in 1986, for which he was sentenced to six weeks' detention. In 1987, he moved to Sidcup and was convicted of burglary and robbery. In 1988, he was convicted of indecent assault and indecent exposure and sentenced to two years' probation. Later in 1988, he was convicted of indecent assault and assault occasioning actual bodily harm. In 1989, he was convicted of indecent exposure and sentenced to 80 hours' community service. In 1990, he was convicted of assaulting a police officer.

Dixie lived in Australia from 1993 and overstayed his visa. He was deported in 1999 after being convicted of a sex offence, for which he was fined.

Dixie was accused of a sexual assault in 2001, where it is believed he masturbated in front of a woman in a telephone booth. He was not prosecuted for this.

== Personal life ==
His mother remarried when he was eight and had two sons with her new husband.

Dixie worked as a chef at the Ye Old Six Bells in Horley, Surrey at the time of Bowman's rape and murder.

== Murder conviction ==
Sally Anne Bowman was stabbed to death yards from her home after a night out with friends. Almost a year later, Dixie's DNA was taken when he was arrested in Crawley, West Sussex, after being involved in a pub fight while watching a World Cup football match. It matched DNA found on Bowman's body.

In October 2006, Dixie's DNA was sent to Western Australia to be tested against that of the DNA evidence in the Claremont serial killer case between 1996 and 1997, as it was believed he was in the area at the time of the killings, and may have committed them. However, WA Police Deputy Commissioner Murray Lampard was later quoted as saying that Dixie had been ruled out as a suspect. (Note: Bradley Robert Edwards was convicted of two of the three Claremont serial murders in 2020) At his trial for the murder of Sally Anne Bowman, an unnamed Thai woman gave evidence that Dixie had stabbed and raped her in Australia in 1998; Dixie has yet to be formally charged with this attack, though a DNA sample from the woman's underwear has been matched to him.

Dixie denied the murder but, as part of his defence, claimed that he had spent the night drinking and doing drugs and had gone out to buy more cocaine. He claimed to have come across Bowman's body, who was already dead, he said, by a third party, and had sex with her after she was killed.

In 2007, Dixie's DNA was matched to the rape of a woman in Fuengirola, Spain, in August 2003. A Dutchman – Romano van der Dussen – had already been sentenced to 15 years in prison for this rape and two sexual assaults that were committed nearby and in the same way as the rape. In June 2015, the Dutch newspaper de Volkskrant reported that Dixie confessed to this rape, but not to the two sexual assaults. van der Dussen was finally exonerated and freed in February 2016 after spending over 12 years in prison.

Dixie was found guilty of murdering Bowman on 22 February 2008 and was sentenced to life imprisonment at the Old Bailey, where Judge Gerald Gordon recommended that Dixie should not be released for a minimum of 34 years, by which time he will be 70 years old. This means he is likely to remain in prison until at least 2040.

Following Dixie's conviction, Detective Superintendent Stuart Cundy, who had led the Bowman investigation, said: "It is my opinion that a national DNA register – with all its appropriate safeguards – could have identified Sally Anne's murderer within 24 hours. Instead it took nearly nine months before Mark Dixie was identified, and almost two-and-a-half years for justice to be done." The calls for such a register were, however, turned down by ministers and other politicians who claimed that it would raise practical as well as civil liberties issues. Dixie confessed to the murder in January 2015.

== Rape convictions ==
In 2017, Dixie was convicted of two rapes – one of which happened in 1986 and the other in 2002. He received two life sentences.

== See also ==
- David Smith, another British killer and multiple rapist
- Batman rapist, an unidentified UK serial rapist who has eluded capture since 1991
- House for sale rapist, an unidentified UK serial rapist who has eluded capture since 1979, suspected to be John Cannan who is the prime suspect in the disappearance of estate agent Suzy Lamplugh
