= Murder of Yanfei Bao =

2023 killing of a real estate agent in New Zealand

- Location: Christchurch, New Zealand
- Date: 19 July 2023; 3 years ago
- Attack type: Kidnapping, homicide
- Victims: Yanfei Bao, 1979 – 2023 (aged 43–44)
- Accused: Tingjun Cao
- Charges: Murder
- Verdict: Guilty
- Convictions: 1
- Convicted: 1
- Judge: Justice Lisa Preston

On 19 July 2023, Harcourts real estate agent Yanfei Bao went missing in Christchurch's Wigram suburb. The New Zealand Police mounted a missing person's search in the Christchurch area. On the 24th of July 2023, Tingjun Cao was charged with her kidnapping after attempting to flee to China on the 22nd of July 2023. On 26 July 2023, the Police launched a homicide investigation into Bao's disappearance. On 30 July 2024, more than a year after her disappearance, Yanfei Bao's remains were found in a shallow grave by police on rural farmland near Lincoln.

Following a seven week trial, in early December 2024, Cao was convicted of murdering Bao. On 13 June 2025, Cao was sentenced to life imprisonment with a minimum term of 17 years for Bao's murder.

== Background ==
Yanfei Bao had recently joined the real estate company Harcourts as a real estate agent. She had a background in sales.

== Disappearance ==
Bao was last seen in the suburb of Hornby, Christchurch, New Zealand on the morning of 19 July 2023. It was reported that she was due to show a potential buyer a property on Trevor Street. Later in the morning Bao rang her friend Jin Tian and had a four-minute conversation with her. During the conversation, Bao asked Tian how someone she was working with could transfer NZ$600,000 from China to pay cash for a house.

== Search and investigation ==
Bao was reported missing after she failed to collect her daughter from after-school care later that day. Her car was found that evening in the suburb of Wigram. Her cellphone was found two days after her disappearance on the Christchurch Southern Motorway, several kilometres away from where she had last been seen.

52-year-old Tingjun Cao was charged with kidnapping Yanfei Bao and arrested at Christchurch Airport after booking a one-way international plane ticket to China on 22 July 2023. Following his arrest, Cao was interrogated by Detective Sergeant Caroline Johnson, with Detective Constable Wei (David) Zhu providing translation advice. Cao told police that he had lost his job a month earlier and had been traveling around in his car looking for a job at the time of Bao's disappearance. Cao said that he had decided to leave New Zealand on the day that Bao disappeared. During the interview, Cao told police that he did not "really" know Bao.

On 26 July 2023 the New Zealand Police said that they had launched a homicide investigation into Bao's disappearance. On 31 July 2023, Police temporarily suspended their search due to high water levels in the Halswell River and Lake Ellesmere / Te Waihora. By that time, police had received over 200 pieces of information related to Bao's disappearance and searched three properties as part of "Operation Helo." Detective Inspector Nicola Reeves also told the public they were looking for a silver Mitsubishi sedan, and asked the public for any sightings of one.

On 7 August 2023, police shifted their search to roads and farmland near Christchurch's Greenpark suburb. On 8 August, Reeves confirmed that police had recovered more items of interest.

On 6 September 2023, police confirmed that they were searching several new areas in Christchurch and Rolleston. Authorities continued to focus on the Halswell River and Greenpark area in October. Police asked for public help locating clothing related to the disappearance, as well as a roughly 1 metre long flat-bottomed spade.

On 19 January 2024, Reeves reiterated that police were still searching for Bao. She stated that police were interested in a silver Mitsubishi 380 with the registration DPH101 and sightings in the wider Christchurch area beyond Lake Ellesmere.

On 19 July 2024, Reeves confirmed that the police investigation into Bao's disappearance was still "very active," and that staff were in the process of finalising evidence ahead of the trial. She reaffirmed the police's commitment to recovering Bao's remains in order to provide closure for her family. By July 2024, the police investigation team had been reduced to eight investigators.

On 30 July 2024, police announced that remains believed to be that of Yanfei Bao were found at a rural property in Greenpark a Neighbourhood in Lincoln. The remains were said to be in a shallow grave just 15cm deep along the treeline at the property. Over 60 police officers were involved in the Tuesday search, taking 90 minutes to locate the grave. In a statement, Detective Inspector Reeves said "new information that had come to light that had given us quite a specific direction for a location of we needed to be." Harcourts Gold Chief Executive Operations Manager Jason Wills extended his condolences on behalf of Harcourts.

On 31 July 2024 an autopsy took place, and on 2 August 2024, police confirmed the remains found on the Greenpark property were that of Bao. During the announcement Detective Inspector Reeves stated, "This news brings to a close a key aspect of our investigation and Yanfei will now be returned to her family." Police confirmed a scene examination had taken place on the involved property.

== Legal proceedings ==
On 15 August 2023, police charged Tingjun Cao with a single charge of murder. Police also confirmed they were seeking information from the public about a tracksuit, top, and spade. That same day, Cao pleaded not guilty to the murder charge. Cao was remanded into custody until 1 September 2023.

On 1 September 2023, Cao was publicly identified after his lawyer no longer sought name suppression. Cao appeared before the Christchurch High Court via audio-visual link. He was remanded in custody, reappearing at the high court by audio-visual 10 November while his lawyer was granted additional time for preparation. Police custody was continued until his next court appearance in December 2023.

A tentative trial date was set for 24 October 2024, and the trial started early on 21 October 2024. Cao opted for a jury trial.

On 23 August 2024, now 53-year-old Cao appeared via video link before Justice Rob Osborne at the Christchurch High Court. Cao's lawyer Joshua Macleod said in a statement, "From our perspective everything is still on track."

== Trial ==
On 21 October 2024, the murder trial began with the selection of a jury of six men and six women. The trial was set to run for six weeks with Justice Lisa Preston presiding at the Christchurch High Court. The court heard from 80 witnesses, including Bao's husband Paul Gooch, family, friends, police officers, forensic experts, and medical professionals. Since the defendant only spoke Chinese, the court utilised the services of a translator to translate the court proceedings from English into Chinese, and vice versa.

The Crown was represented by prosecutors Cameron Stuart and Pip Currie. Cao was initially represented by defence lawyers Colin Eason and Joshua Macleod. During the third week of the trial, Cao sacked his defence team and decided to represent himself during the trial. Justice Preston appointed Eason and Macleod as standby counsel.

=== Opening arguments ===
During the first day, Cao pleaded not guilty through an interpreter. Stuart delivered the Crown's opening address, arguing that Cao had stabbed Yanfei Bao inside a Trevor Street property he had intended to buy, before putting her body into a car and hiding it on farmland. He said there was possible sexual motive behind Cao's murder of Bao, citing a deleted photo found on the defendant's phone. Stuart also said that forensic evidence confirmed that Bao's blood was found inside the property and that CCTV footage, phone polling and geolocation data were used to track Cao's movements. Stuart also explained that Police had been able to unlock Bao's phone in May 2024, allowing them to use the cellphone data to find Bao's remains and track Cao's movements following her disappearance.

MacLeod delivered the defence's opening address, stating that Cao denied murdering Bao and that the defence position was that the evidence did not support a guilty verdict. He claimed that the evidence was "much muddier than the Crown would lead you to believe," and urged the jury not to let emotions "cloud their judgment." MacLeod also questioned the scope of the Police investigation.

=== Crown testimony and evidence ===
The Crown presented several witnesses including Detective Constable Andrew Calder, Bao's partner Paul Gooch, builder Mervin Boclot, several of Bao's colleagues, friends, and relatives, hardware store owner Dennis Shrimpton, and Cao's former employer Chun-Chieh (Jason) Li. The Crown also submitted footage of Cao entering the Home and Castle Hardware and Stuff hardware store in New Brighton and buying a spade on the same day that Bao was murdered. In addition, Police detective inspector Joel Syme told the Court that Police were able to track Bao's cellphone movements around Halswell Village and Tai Tapu cell tower.

Other Crown witnesses included Senior Constable Dean Stevenson, Police digital forensic analyst Joshua Locke (who analysed Bao's phone messages), Detective Constables Andrew Calder, Grace Schurgers, and Constable Duncan Fosbender. During the court proceedings, Judge Preston warned Cao several times for repeatedly asking the witnesses irrelevant questions, previously-asked questions and questions that were beyond the witnesses' scope. ESR forensic scientist Wendy Janes testified about forensic evidence found at the Hornby property that Bao visited prior to her death. The Court also heard testimony regarding Bao's car and injuries from constables Abigail Howe, Clayton Davison and detective Geoff Reid. In addition, the Crown presented a six hour Police interview of Cao following his arrest on 22 July 2023.

=== Defence testimony ===
On 29 November, Cao testified in his own defence. He admitted going to Trevor Street on the day that Bao went missing but claimed that the victim was not inside the property. While walking back to his car, Cao said that he met a stranger called Mr. Tang, who asked to test drive his car. Cao allowed Mr. Tang to drive the car, and even lent him his shoes. Cao also claimed that his phone was in the car while Tang drove.

On 2 December, Cao continued his testimony, claiming that Mr. Tang communicated with him via a walkie talkie, since he had Cao's phone. During his testimony, Cao said he was not suggesting that Tang murdered Bao. Cao claimed that he could verify Tang existed because a forensic examination of his shoes showed DNA belonging to more than one person. During cross-examination, Currie challenged the veracity of Cao's testimony, describing it as "completely fictitious and made up." She also referred to Cao's police interview where he had confirmed that he was the only one using the car during the period of Bao's disappearance. She also submitted evidence that Cao had admitted ownership of his cellphone, and argued that the defendant had led the victim to the Trevor Street property under false pretenses. Cao accused the Police of planting evidence incriminating him. He also alleged that he had been mistreated and denied sleep by Police following his arrest.

=== Closing arguments ===
On 3 December, Currie delivered the Crown's closing address. She argued that Cao had lured Bao to the Trevor Street property under the pretext of viewing and possibly purchasing it. Currie said that Cao had attacked the victim before transporting her into the boot of his car to MacArtneys Road, where he murdered her. After buying a spade from a hardware store in New Brighton, the defendant buried Bao's remains in a shallow grave at a farm in the Greenpark area. Currie said that the Crown's evidence was supported by an overwhelming amount of video, social media, eyewitness, forensic and cellular phone evidence.

=== Verdict ===
On 4 December, Justice Preston outlined the Crown's case to the jury, who retired to consider their verdict. She told the jury not to infer anything from the Cao's earlier courtroom behaviour and that the burden of proof lay with the Crown. Preston also outlined Cao's case that the Crown had falsified the evidence against him and that another man named Tang had murdered Bao, taken a graphic photo of her with Cao's phone and used Cao's car to dispose of her remains.

That same day, Cao was found guilty of murdering Yanfei Bao by the Christchurch High Court jury, who had deliberated for one and a half hours. Bao's partner Paul Gooch welcomed the verdict and criticised Cao for his lack of remorse and humanity during the trial proceedings.Gooch also thanked the New Zealand Police for bringing Cao to justice and his stepdaughter's school "for helping her navigate the incredibly traumatic experience." Detective Inspector Reeves also welcomed the resolution of Bao's murder case and expressed empathy with Bao's family. Cao was remanded in custody for sentencing, scheduled for 7 March 2025.

=== Sentencing ===
On 13 June 2025, Cao's sentencing hearing took place at the Christchurch High Court, with Judge Lisa Preston presiding. Cao was removed from the courtroom and sent to another room with a video link after disrupting court proceedings. Cao's lawyer Colin Eason explained that he did not understand it was a sentencing hearing and that he wanted to appeal his conviction. Though Cao had sacked his lawyers, they remained in court to represent him. Cao maintained his innocence and alleged that a man named Tang had murdered Bao.

During the sentencing hearing, the court heard victim impact statements from Bao's 11 year old daughter, her husband Paul Gooch, her father-in-law David Gooch and Bao's 74-year old father (who spoke via video link from China). Detective Inspector Reeves also paid tribute to Bao and her family. Crown prosecutor Cameron Stuart had sought a maximum sentence of life imprisonment, citing the "brutal" nature of the crime and Cao's "callous" conduct in the aftermath of the killing. Eason asked Judge Preston to consider "mitigating factors" such as Cao's profound sense of isolation in prison due to his lack of English language skills and his isolation from his wife and teenage sons. He sought a minimum term of 17 years. Judge Preston criticised Cao for sexually violating Bao during the assault and for his lack of remorse. She imposed a life sentence with a minimum non-parole term of 17 years and five months.

== Aftermath ==
By 31 July 2023, a Givealittle fundraising page was established by Bao's friend Vani Liu. By the time it had ended in August 2023, over NZ$50,000 was raised to help her immediate family and relatives from China.

On 18 November 2024, a public memorial service for Yanfei Bao was held at Our Lady of Victories Church in Sockburn. Bao's partner, father, and sister delivered eulogies during the memorial service.

== See also ==
- List of kidnappings
- List of solved missing person cases (2020s)
- Disappearance of Suzy Lamplugh – 1986 disappearance of woman in London
