= Norton Barracks =

Military building in Worcestershire, England

- Norton, Worcestershire
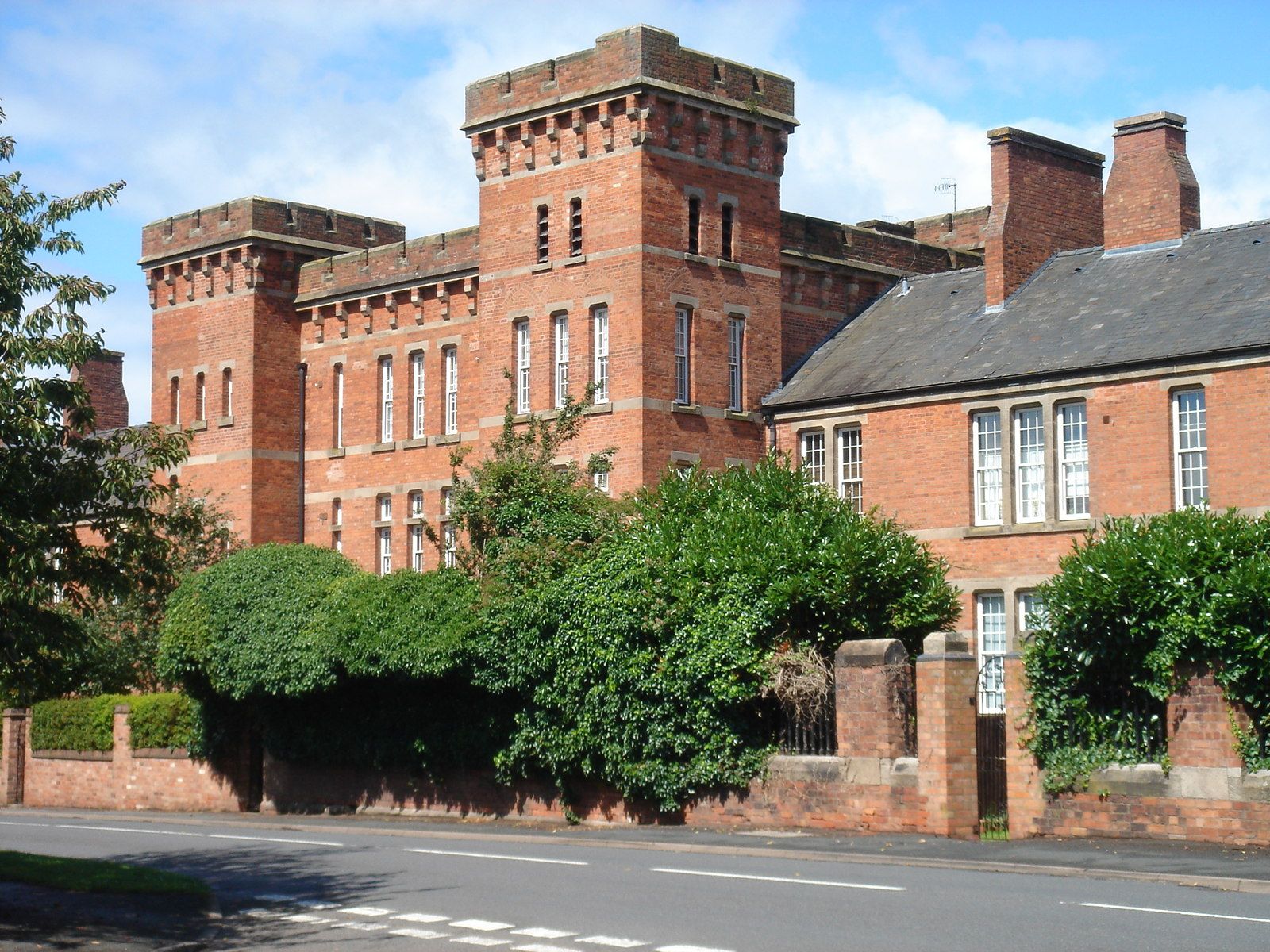
- Norton Barracks

Site information
- Type: Barracks
- Owner: Ministry of Defence
- Operator: British Army

Location
- Location within Worcestershire
- Coordinates: 52.163°N 2.193°W

Site history
- Built: 1874-1877
- Built for: War Office
- In use: 1877-1987

Garrison information
- Occupants: Worcestershire Regiment

Norton Barracks is a former military installation in Norton, Worcestershire. The keep is a Grade II listed building.

== History ==
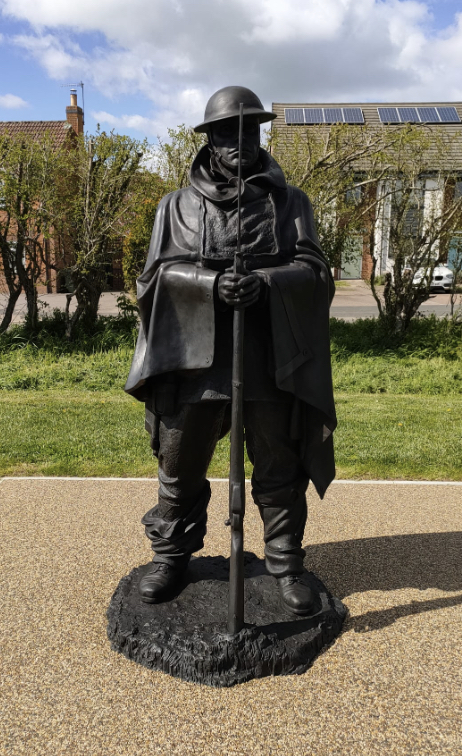
Statue by John McKenna in 2023

The barracks were built in the Fortress Gothic Revival Style between 1874 and 1877. Their creation took place as part of the Cardwell Reforms which encouraged the localisation of British military forces. The barracks became the depot for the 29th (Worcestershire) Regiment of Foot and the 36th (Herefordshire) Regiment of Foot. Following the Childers Reforms, the 29th and 36th Regiments amalgamated as the Worcestershire Regiment with its depot in the barracks in 1881. Many recruits were enlisted at the barracks during the early stages of the First World War. A Regimental Museum was established at the barracks in 1933 and the barracks continued to operate as a training facility during the Second World War.

In 1970 the Worcestershire Regiment amalgamated with the Sherwood Foresters to form the Worcestershire and Sherwood Foresters Regiment which established its depot at Battlesbury Barracks in Warminster. The Worcestershire Regiment Museum collection moved to the Worcester City Art Gallery & Museum in 1970. At around the same time 14 Signal Regiment (Satellite and Heavy Radio) moved onto the site and remained there until they were disbanded in 1977.

In 1987 the keep was sold to property developers for conversion into apartments and the rest of the site was developed as a housing estate. The site remains the home of the Worcester Norton Shooting Club.

In 1990, a woman named Gilly Paige, with whom John Cannan had been in a relationship after the disappearance of Suzy Lamplugh, informed police that Cannan had spoken about the Lamplugh case and told her that Lamplugh was buried at Norton Barracks. Based on the evidence, the police began a search for Lamplugh's body and investigators wanted to dig at Norton Barracks. The area had been significantly redeveloped in the intervening years, however, the Army having left the site in 1979 and investigators were not able to dig in the area because of the houses now standing there.

In 2022 a statue of a sentry by Scottish sculptor John McKenna was unveiled near the barracks. Anne, Princess Royal later paid a visit to the sculpture in 2023 to honour those who served in the Worcestershire Regiment.
