= John Cannan =

British murderer and serial rapist (1954–2024)

- Born: John David Guise Cannan; 20 February 1954; Sutton Coldfield, Warwickshire, England, UK
- Died: 6 November 2024 (aged 70); HM Prison Full Sutton, East Riding of Yorkshire, England, UK
- Convictions: Indecent assault (1968); Rape (1981); Murder, rape, abduction and attempted kidnap (1989)
- Penalty: Probation (1968); 8 years (1981); Life imprisonment, minimum tariff 35 years (1989)

Details
- Span of crimes: 1968–1987
- Country: United Kingdom
- Date apprehended: 29 October 1987
- Imprisoned at: HM Prison Full Sutton

John David Guise Cannan (20 February 1954 – 6 November 2024), also known under the alias John Peterson, was a British murderer, serial rapist, serial abductor and suspected serial killer. He was convicted in July 1988 and given three life sentences for the murder of Shirley Banks in Bristol in October 1987, the attempted kidnapping of Julia Holman on the previous night, the rape of a woman in Reading, Berkshire, in 1986, the rape of his girlfriend in December 1980, and several other abductions, attempted abductions and sexual offences.

Cannan was also the prime suspect in the disappearance of Fulham estate agent Suzy Lamplugh, who had an appointment on 28 July 1986 to meet a man calling himself "Mr. Kipper" and has not been seen since. In November 2002, the Crown Prosecution Service decided that there was insufficient evidence to charge Cannan with Lamplugh's abduction and presumed murder. That month the Metropolitan Police held a press conference at which, in a rare move, officers publicly named Cannan as the man they believed murdered Lamplugh. Cannan said he knew who killed Lamplugh and stated that this person was the same person responsible for the murder of Banks, of which he himself was convicted. DNA evidence showed Lamplugh had previously been in a car Cannan used at the time of her disappearance.

In September 2023 Cannan became eligible for parole, which was refused the following month. Cannan died in Full Sutton Prison on 6 November 2024, at the age of 70, from natural causes.

== Early life ==
John Cannan was born in Sutton Coldfield, Warwickshire, on 20 February 1954 to father Cyril Cannan, a flight lieutenant in the Royal Air Force during the Second World War, and mother Sheila Cannan, an engineer. Cannan came from a middle-class family and was first sent by his parents to Keyse private school for boys at the age of 4. He attended public school until the age of 15.

Cannan claimed that when he was 7 and 8 he was sexually abused by a teacher, being forced to drop his trousers and touch the abuser while being indecently assaulted himself; he continued to be abused by the teacher for months. These alleged events had a lasting effect on Cannan, who felt deeply ashamed by them, and he developed a stammer from being nervous in the school environment.

At the age of 9 Cannan was removed from school and sought medical help for his anxiety. He later claimed that the sexual abuse left him struggling with feelings of humiliation and shame, which in turn led him to express much anger and resentment. Cannan also had a difficult relationship with his father, "who was quick to criticise and had an unpredictable temper." Cannan was in the merchant navy for three months at age 17, then began working as a car salesman in his father's company.

Cannan married June Vale in May 1978, seven years after they had become engaged. Vale would prove to be his one and only steady girlfriend, although he claimed that he was hassled into marrying her. Vale soon gave birth to a daughter, whom Cannan did not want.

== Sexual offences and robberies ==
In 1968, at age 14, Cannan indecently assaulted a woman in a phone box in Erdington, for which he was placed on probation. By 1980, with his marriage becoming increasingly troubled, Cannan had slipped into alcoholism and spent much of his time frequenting bars and nightclubs in order to avoid going home after work.

=== 1980–1987 ===
In early 1980, Cannan left his family and began a new relationship with a woman publicly known under the pseudonym "Sharon Major." Major's attempt to leave their relationship triggered a violent reaction from Cannan, who turned up at her house on New Year's Eve with a bottle of wine and, unbeknownst to her, a firearm. Cannan strangled Major during the subsequent rape, but she was able to fight him off and was taken to hospital in an ambulance. Cannan told her on the way to the hospital that he had meant to kill her. Later, in February 1981, Cannan robbed a petrol station kiosk, using a knife to threaten two female assistants. The following month, during a robbery at a ladies' knitwear shop, Cannan raped shop assistant Jean Bradford at knifepoint after threatening to stab her seventeen-month-old baby, who was in a back room; Bradford's mother arrived during the attack, only to be tied up by Cannan and forced to watch the attack continue.

At Birmingham Crown Court on 26 June 1981, after pleading guilty, Cannan was sentenced to five years' imprisonment for raping Bradford and a consecutive three years for two counts of robbery. He served five years of his eight-year sentence, first at Bristol Prison before transfer to The Verne Prison, and finally to London. From 25 January 1986 until the end of his sentence in July, Cannan was serving his sentence at a prison hostel outside Wormwood Scrubs Prison, meaning he was on day release at the time of the murder of Sandra Court in Bournemouth in May and in the lead up to Suzy Lamplugh's disappearance in July. Cannan attempted suicide in September by overdosing on paracetamol tablets.

Police stated that Cannan's modus operandi was to pretend to be a West Country businessman. He would ply women with chocolates and flowers, then attack when the women rejected him. Between 1986 and 1987, Cannan had an affair with his solicitor; he then threatened her and her family. Only ten weeks after his release from prison, Cannan raped a woman at knifepoint in Reading in October 1986, an attack he was linked to by DNA from semen. Cannan had come up to the woman's car asking for directions, then brandished a knife before raping and sodomising her. He had been arrested for this offence earlier but denied involvement, giving the alibi that he was in Sutton Coldfield at the time of the attack. Forensic evidence was not strong enough to charge Cannan; an early DNA profile test was inconclusive.

In 1988, as part of the evidence-gathering about Cannan for the investigation into the murder of Shirley Banks (see below), the Home Office ran the DNA test again, by which time the testing technology had improved and demonstrated a match. Further DNA testing by Imperial Chemical Industries also found a match; they had been asked to run the tests because they had more sophisticated DNA testing equipment. Police also used evidence from Cannan's cashpoint card to prove that he had travelled from London to Bristol that day. Reading is on the railway line between these cities.

External videos
- Footage of Cannan's September 1987 video-dating advert, released by police

In September 1987, Cannan signed up for a video-dating agency, giving the fake name of "John Peterson". An HTV West news report in 1989 said that Cannan's dating video had received a high response from other daters. Berry and Odell maintain that his video-dating advert was not shown to other daters due to concerns surrounding his odd behaviour. On 7 October 1987, Cannan tried to abduct thirty-year-old Bristol businesswoman Julia Holman from a car park, but she fought him off and later identified him as her attacker.

== Murder of Shirley Banks ==
=== Disappearance ===
Shirley Banks, a newly married twenty-nine-year-old textile factory manager from Clifton, Bristol, was abducted on the evening of 8 October 1987 sometime after 7:40 pm while on a shopping trip to Broadmead. Banks's husband searched for her in bars when she failed to return home, as they had agreed to meet for a drink; when he rang her work the next morning he was told she had phoned in sick with an upset stomach fifteen minutes earlier. When she again failed to return home he called police. Investigators believe that Banks was held captive overnight in Cannan's flat and that he then persuaded her to phone in sick to work after pretending he was going to release her.

=== Investigation ===
150 officers from five police forces spent around 140,000 man-hours on the case. Police put out television appeals and searched Bristol Docks for Banks's car. They considered that the telephone call to her work could mean she had left voluntarily and also considered whether her husband could be a suspect but he was quickly eliminated. Police had planned to link the attempted abduction of Holman on a Crimewatch reconstruction in November, before Cannan's further crimes led to his arrest.

==== Arrest of Cannan ====
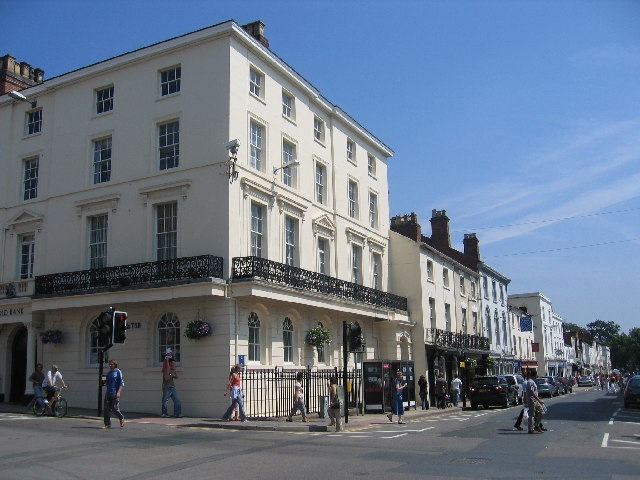
Regent Street in Leamington Spa

Cannan, then living at Foye House, Leigh Woods, was arrested on 29 October in Leamington Spa for an assault at knifepoint on an assistant at a Regent Street dress shop. Two passersby had chased him away and called police. Cannan evaded police briefly but they found a knife and bag with blood on it. Police spotted Cannan, saw his hand was bleeding and arrested him. Near the shop they found his black BMW, which contained rope and an imitation handgun; they also found rope hidden in a toilet cistern in a garage.

==== Link to Banks ====
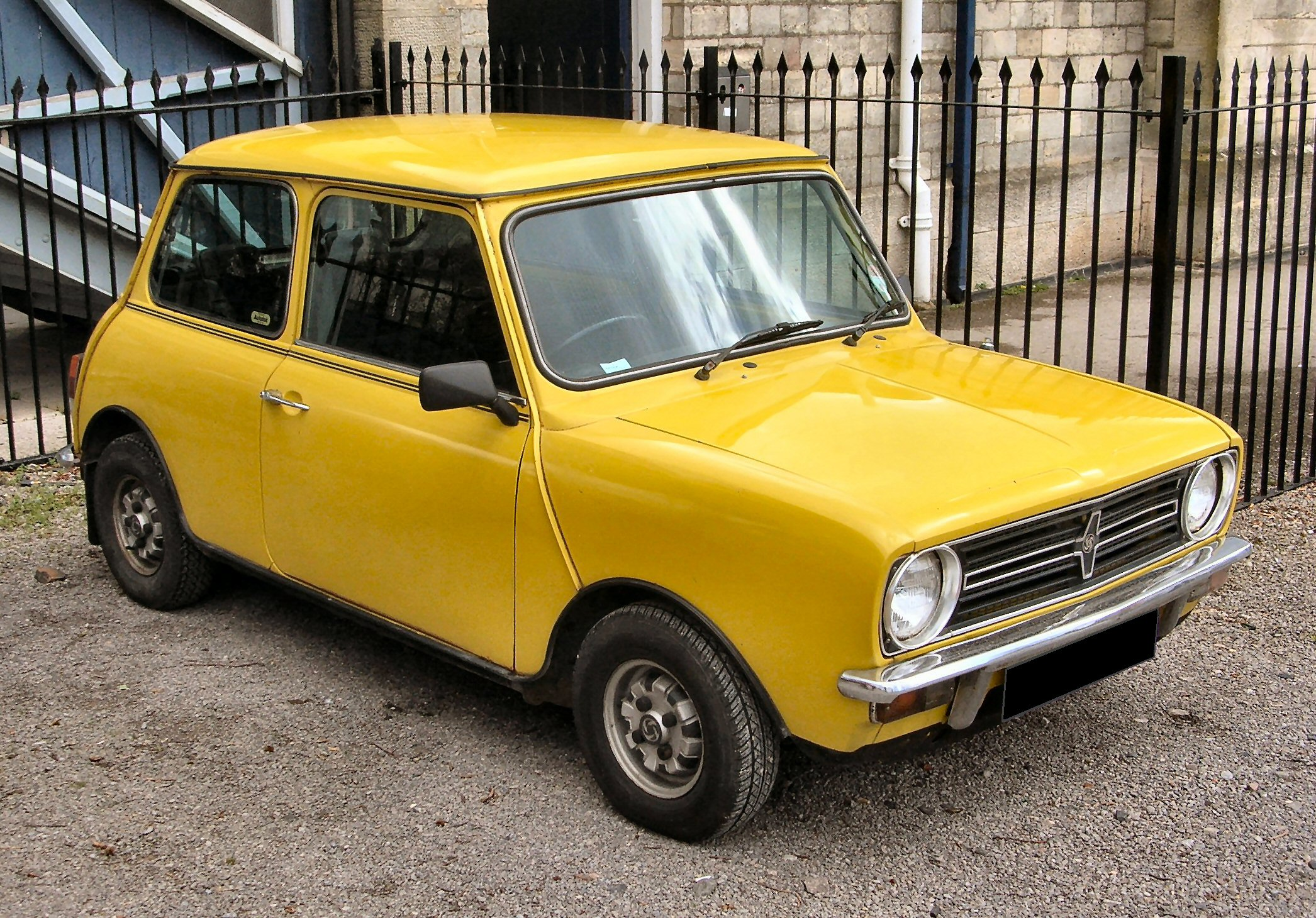
A Mini Clubman similar to Banks's

Police searched Cannan's car three weeks after Banks had disappeared and found a tax disc for her car inside a briefcase in the glove compartment. Her orange Mini Clubman was found, painted blue, in the lock-up garage at Cannan's block of flats. Cannan was bailed from Warwick police station, where he was being interviewed for the attempted robbery, whereupon police from Bristol promptly rearrested him regarding Banks's disappearance. News media immediately linked Banks's disappearance to that of Lamplugh, publishing Cannan's prior criminal record. Police charged Cannan with assault on 2 November. He had no alibi for the night of Banks's disappearance and claimed he had bought her Mini from a man at an auction.

==== Witnesses ====
A taxi driver came forward to say that a woman had called a taxi to Cannan's flat at about 2:00 pm on the day after Banks disappeared, but Cannan told him nobody had called one. At about 2:30 pm he borrowed a vacuum cleaner from a neighbour and was seen cleaning his car. His movements could not be accounted for between 3:00 pm and 7:00 pm. Police brought in Holman, whom he had attempted to abduct the night before the murder, and she immediately identified him in the line up.

Hoping that Banks was still alive, police released Cannan's picture to the press. A 69-year-old woman came forward to say she had been in traffic near Cannan's flat on 9 October and seen smoke from a small fire in a copse. In the woods she heard a struggle, punching, a woman saying, "No, no," and a man saying, "I warned you what I would do." There was also a choking sound. The elderly woman shouted towards the man with "dark, curly hair", who saw her, ran towards her and lunged at her. Police were sceptical but believed that it was possible she had heard and seen something in the woods.

==== Forensics ====
Investigators found a cleaning ticket for a shop in Sutton Coldfield and found that Cannan had dropped off a raincoat with red marks on it in late October. He claimed the marks were due to red mud from making love in a park; police found the marks were bloodstains that could have been from the same blood group as Banks.

Police built up a composite set of Banks's fingerprints from her parents' house, her home and her work. The left thumbprint matched a document in Cannan's flat. He acknowledged that the document came from his flat before he knew about the thumbprint. Cannan was charged with Banks's kidnap and murder on 23 December 1987.

==== Discovery of Banks's body ====
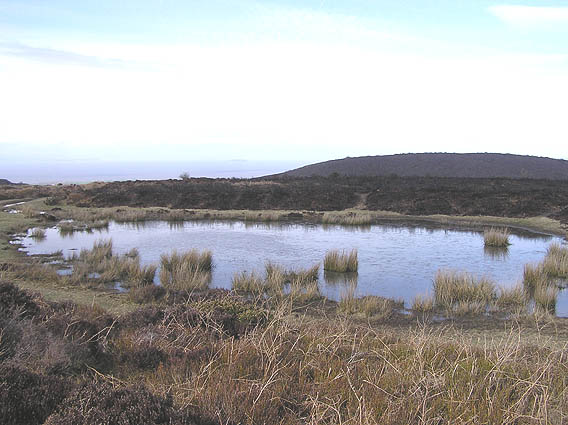
View towards the Dowsborough Hill Fort where Banks's body was found

Banks's naked, decomposed body was found in a stream on 3 April 1988, six months after her disappearance, around 48 miles (77 km) from Bristol at a site named Dead Woman's Ditch, which is part of an Iron Age encampment at Dowsborough in the Quantock Hills. In the dark-red mud police also found gold jewellery and buttons from a dress Banks had bought. According to pathologist Bernard Knight, she was killed by being hit repeatedly on the head with a rock.

=== Trial ===
You are extremely attractive to some women. But under that there lies a most evil violence and horrible side to your character.

— Mr Justice Drake at sentencing, 1989.

Cannan's trial began on 5 April 1989, when he was charged with the murder of Banks and a further eight charges including "rape, buggery, kidnap, attempted abduction, indecent assault and abduction for sex." The trial lasted three weeks. After ten hours of deliberation on 28 April the jury found Cannan guilty of all charges: the abduction and murder of Banks, the rape and buggery of a Reading woman and the attempted kidnap at gunpoint of Holman. He was jailed for life by Mr Justice Drake at Exeter Crown Court. Drake praised the investigation led by Detective Chief Inspector Brian Saunders.

== Suspected cases ==
He has gone down as an "emerging" serial killer, but I have no doubt that he killed more than the three women whose deaths he is officially linked to[.]

— Christopher Berry-Dee, 2010

=== House for Sale Rapist ===
From the late 1970s until 1980 a series of unsolved and brutal rapes occurred in the West Midlands, where Cannan was living at that time. The unidentified rapist became known as the House for Sale Rapist for specifically targeting homes marketed by estate agents. Twenty women were assaulted and raped in properties in the area and no one was ever arrested for the crimes. Police now suspect that Cannan was responsible for these offences, which coincided with the deterioration of his marriage. The rapes stopped in early 1980, around the time Cannan left his family and began his relationship with the woman known as Sharon Major.

Detectives would later note that the offences of the House for Sale Rapist bore all the hallmarks of Cannan's later crimes and also noted the similarities to the disappearance of Lamplugh, who was an estate agent. Notably, Cannan showed up uninvited to a house that was for sale in Shorrolds Road in Fulham days before Lamplugh was last seen there, believing that the young female occupant was alone in the house. He was observed acting strangely until the woman's husband appeared, causing him to quickly leave the premises.

=== Murder of Sandra Court ===
In November 2001 police interviewed Cannan at a police station in York about the murder of twenty-seven-year-old insurance clerk Sandra Court in May 1986. Court had been dropped off by a taxi driver near her sister's house in Throop, Dorset after a night out but her sister was not at home. Court had last been seen walking barefoot, appearing slightly drunk, at around 2:45 am. Court's body was found the next day in a water-filled ditch near the River Avon several miles away. A pay and display ticket proved that Cannan was in nearby Bournemouth the day she was killed.

In addition, after a red Ford Sierra that Cannan had access to when Court was murdered was discovered at a North London scrapyard during the Lamplugh reinvestigations of the early 2000s, two hairs were found inside that matched Court’s DNA. Nevertheless the DNA evidence was not strong enough to bring a prosecution against Cannan for her murder.

Court had been killed by strangulation. Ten days after the discovery of her body an anonymous letter was sent to police from Southampton. The letter said the death was "an accident" and that the killer was "truly sorry". It also said that "the person concerned is deeply unhappy, hurt and in total shock" and that "the only reason the person has not come forward is the fact of being afraid that their explanation will not be believed." Although an attempt had been made to disguise it, the handwriting style bore clear similarities to Cannan's. In 2007 crime writers Christopher Berry-Dee and Robin Odell, while writing a book on Cannan, handed police letters they had received from Cannan from prison, which gave them a means of comparison to the original letter. The police found them so useful that they refused to return them to the authors when requested. When interviewed, Cannan denied having ever been to Bournemouth on the day in question but was shown to have lied because of the pay-and-display parking ticket.

=== Disappearance of Suzy Lamplugh ===
Cannan will reoffend. He should never be released. If you look at his profile, I have no doubt he will strike again. He has been released from prison before and committed crimes. He is a danger to the female population, particularly the blonde, twenty-something professionals like Suzy. Even if he wasn't released until he was 60 he would go on to abduct, rape and murder women.

— Detective Superintendent Jim Dickie, 2006
The key locations involved in Lamplugh's disappearance in Fulham.

1. Sturgis estate agents, where Suzy was working the day she disappeared.
2. 12:45 – 1:00 p.m. sightings at 37 Shorrolds Road
3. 10:00 p.m. Location Suzy's white Ford Fiesta works car found by police.
4. Sighting driving north with a man, 2:45 p.m.
5. Wormwood Scrubs prison hostel
6. Prince of Wales pub where her diary was taken
7. Sighting of a woman fighting with a man in a BMW car that afternoon

Cannan was questioned by police in 1989 and 1990 regarding the disappearance of twenty-five-year-old Susannah "Suzy" Jane Lamplugh on 28 July 1986. In August 1991 he wrote a letter to the Sutton News newspaper denying any part in her disappearance. Lamplugh was officially declared dead in absentia in July 1993. In December 2000, Cannan was arrested for Lamplugh's murder and questioned, but he was not charged. In November 2002, in a rare move, officers of the Metropolitan Police stated publicly their belief that Cannan was responsible for Lamplugh's murder, reiterating their suspicions when arguing against any reduction in Cannan's tariff in 2006.

In November 2002, Cannan complained via his solicitors about being publicly named by police, saying he was "devastated and distressed". He again denied killing Lamplugh. Cannan's solicitor complained about a lack of presumption of innocence and that the prison service had withheld letters Cannan had tried to send to national newspapers regarding the allegations.

That same month, Mark Dennis, a senior Treasury counsel, decided that there was insufficient evidence to charge Cannan over Lamplugh's disappearance. Her parents considered, but decided against, bringing a private prosecution and civil action against Cannan. In July 1993, The Independent argued that the judge's sentencing statement, that Cannan should remain in prison for the rest of his natural life, removed any incentive for him to confess post-conviction.

==== Evidence ====
In November 2002, investigators stated that Cannan should have been a suspect much earlier in the Lamplugh investigation: police in 1986 should have checked for recently released sex offenders, and should have followed up information given by Lamplugh's parents about a man from Bristol. Cannan was released from his prison hostel three days before Lamplugh disappeared. His colleagues said he often went to wine bars in Fulham, where Lamplugh worked. Lamplugh was supposed to meet a "Mr. Kipper" when she disappeared, and Cannan was said to have used the name "Kipper" in prison. In 2000, a new investigating team, led by Detective Superintendent Jim Dickie, computerised the card index from Lamplugh case and found that several estate agents in Fulham had been visited by a Mr. Kipper.

Cannan may have had access to a black BMW, similar to a car linked to Lamplugh's kidnap; Lamplugh was last seen getting into a BMW with a man holding champagne, which led Daphne Sargent, an ex-girlfriend of Cannan, to say, "As soon as I heard about Suzy, I knew it was John. It had all the hallmarks— right down to the champagne." Cannan resembles a photofit of a man seen with Lamplugh the day she disappeared. A later girlfriend of Cannan said he had "a strong interest" in the case, and police believe Lamplugh may have been in a relationship with Cannan.

In 2007, a criminologist who had corresponded with Cannan revealed that police reinvestigations had discovered DNA evidence showing Lamplugh had been inside a car previously owned by Cannan. The criminologist had pointed out to police that Cannan had access to a red Ford Sierra at the time Lamplugh disappeared, something police had previously been unaware of. Detectives subsequently attempted to find the car and discovered it in a scrapyard. Although DNA tests indicated Lamplugh had been in the car, as well as Cannan, the Crown Prosecution Service felt there was insufficient evidence to prove that they had been in the vehicle at the same time, meaning charges were unable to be brought against Cannan for her murder.

In April 2001, police revealed that Cannan had placed the number plate SLP 386S on Banks's Mini; they believed 386 to be a grid reference, as the site Banks' body was found was near Northing Line 386 and Norton Manor barracks was near 3° 08' 06" West. When police interviewed Cannan about the significance of the number plate, he acknowledged that the initials could stand for Suzy Lamplugh but said a "Bristol businessman" from whom he bought the car for £100 was responsible for the deaths of Lamplugh, Banks and another woman. Asked if that businessman was him, he replied, "Yes," but then immediately recanted. Cannan allegedly told an astrologer who visited him in jail that "a Bristol businessman" murdered Lamplugh and, "I know who killed Shirley, Suzy and another girl."

==== Possible burial sites ====
Cannan's ex-girlfriend Gilly Paige told police as early as 1990 that he had said Lamplugh's body was buried at Norton Barracks, although she later retracted the assertion. In December 2000, after a letter was sent to Lamplugh's mother claiming she was buried there, a five-day search by more than thirty officers in and around the former site of the barracks failed to find her body.

In February 2001, the Metropolitan Police searched the barracks site again. In April 2001, police realised that it was possible the barracks named were actually Norton Manor barracks in Somerset, 8 miles (13 km) from where Banks's body was found. In April 2001, a cellmate of Cannan said that Lamplugh was buried under the patio of Cannan's mother's house in Sutton Coldfield. In October 2018, police officers returned to the house and dug up the garden. After two weeks of searching the garden and an area under a garage, investigators confirmed that no evidence had been recovered.

In August 2010, police searched a field 3 miles (4.8 km) from the site in Worcestershire after a witness remembered seeing a mound of earth there in 1986 when he was a teenager. Investigators used ground-penetrating radar, and trenches were dug by the side of the road between Pershore and Drakes Broughton. At the same time, they also searched woodland in the Quantock Hills, where Banks's body was found.

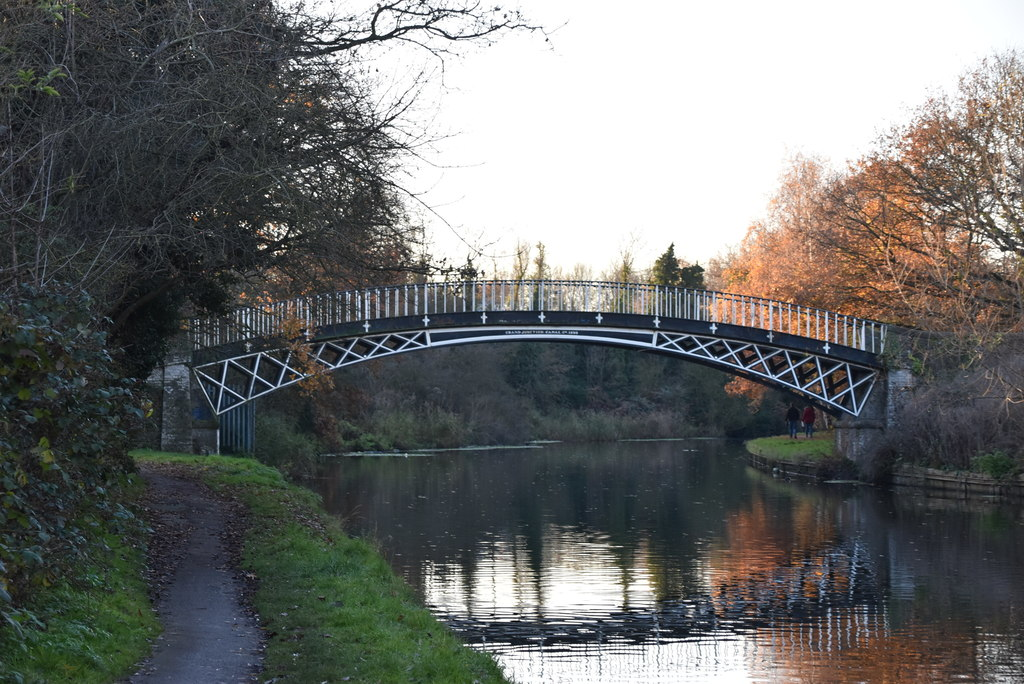
Gallows Bridge, Brentford Canal, Grand Union Canal

In 2019, police investigated an eyewitness report from 1986 of a man resembling Cannan pushing a suitcase into Brentford Canal by Gallows Bridge. However, no further dredging took place as records showed it had been dredged for unrelated reasons in 2014 and was drained regularly every five years.

== Prison life ==
Cannan was a Category A offender at Full Sutton Prison in York, continually protesting his innocence. He studied for an Open University degree while in prison. His minimum tariff was thirty-five years. Cannan suggested that he would confess to Lamplugh's murder only when his mother died, to avoid causing her further grief. An anonymous relative of Cannan's also stated a belief that he would confess when his mother died. Cannan and his mother remained close after his conviction and she continued to visit him every week.

In November 2002 the Metropolitan Police convened a press conference in which officers named Cannan as the man they believed murdered Lamplugh.

In August 2016 Cannan wrote a letter to prisoners' newspaper Inside Time saying that prisoners should be given the vote. In August 2017 he sent another letter to the newspaper from prison, describing how he had written to Secretary of State for Justice David Lidington asking him to stop the implementation of a smoking ban in all English prisons. He said that his request should be granted "to allow fresh ideas, arguments and evidence from staff and inmates to be placed before him for his consideration" and added "I believe a delay would permit a wiser and more thoughtful consideration of its rationale." The smoking ban was implemented in 2018. In June 2022 it was reported that Cannan was on his deathbed and receiving palliative care.

In September 2023 Cannan faced a parole hearing after serving his minimum term of thirty-three years and 214 days. On 9 October 2023 the parole board refused to release him and refused to move him from his current Category A prison to open conditions, which would have seen him downgraded to a Category D facility.

=== Legal action ===
In July 1989 Cannan failed to persuade the High Court to stop the BBC from broadcasting a Crimewatch UK documentary on the investigation into the murder of Banks. A case he took to the High Court in January 2003, claiming that his right to "free and unimpeded" legal advice was being restricted, failed. In June 2009 he lodged another case at the High Court for alleged human rights breaches: he claimed that his ineligibility for a sexual-offences treatment programme, owing to his continued claim of innocence, was illegal. He appealed for his thirty-five-year minimum tariff to be reduced but Mr Justice Coulson ruled against it in June 2008 because his crimes involved "a significant degree of planning and premeditation" and there were "no real mitigating factors at all."

== Death ==
Cannan died in Full Sutton Prison on 6 November 2024 at the age of 70. His death was confirmed by the Prison Service, which also said: "As with all deaths in custody, the Prisons and Probation Ombudsman will investigate." At a coroner's inquest, opened on 15 November 2024, it was stated that Cannan's death was from natural causes, specifically a ruptured abdominal aortic aneurysm. A date for a full inquest was yet to be set.
