= Diana Lamplugh =

British charity founder (1936–2011)

- Born: Diana Elizabeth Howell; 30 July 1936; Cheltenham
- Died: 18 August 2011 (aged 75)
- Education: Westonbirt
- Occupation: Charity organiser
- Known for: Establishing a charity for women who are being harassed
- Spouse: Paul Lamplugh
- Children: Suzy Lamplugh

Diana Lamplugh OBE born Diana Elizabeth Howell (30 July 1936 – 18 August 2011) was a British charity founder and campaigner. After her adult daughter's disappearance, she and her husband, Paul, established a charity that became the leading resource for women in the UK who are being harassed.

== Life ==
Lamplugh was born in Cheltenham in 1936. She was an independent but not an academic child. She left Westonbirt, a private school in Gloucestershire, when she was sixteen having been told that she was destined to be a secretary. Her father thought she could be an actor and taught her to project her voice. She didn't become an actor but the confidence of her voice was to be useful later.

She married Paul Lamplugh and they had four children. Paul worked as a solicitor and Diana and a business partner started a company called Slimnastics. She wrote a book about her idea. In 1986 their second child Suzy Lamplugh disappeared. Suzy was an estate agent and she had gone to meet a client but she was never seen again.

== Suzy Lamplugh Trust ==
The Suzy Lamplugh Trust (a charitable foundation) was established in December 1986 by Lamplugh and her husband. The mission of the Trust is to raise awareness of personal safety through training and various projects, to help people avoid becoming victims of aggression, and to offer counselling and support to relatives and friends of missing people. The Trust runs the UK's The National Stalking Helpline.

Diana and Paul Lamplugh were appointed to OBE, in 1992 and 2005 respectively, for their charitable work with the Suzy Lamplugh Trust.

== Death and legacy ==
Lamplugh died in August 2011 at the age of 75 after a stroke in 2003 and several years with Alzheimer's disease. Her husband Paul died aged 87 in June 2018. The search for Suzy's body was still on-going in 2018 when a garden associated with her named killer was dug up by the police, who found nothing. By this time the Lamplugh charity was acknowledged as the leading resource for British women who were being harassed.
