= Dead Woman's Ditch =

Earthwork in Somerset, England

Coordinates: 51°08′1″N 3°12′00″W

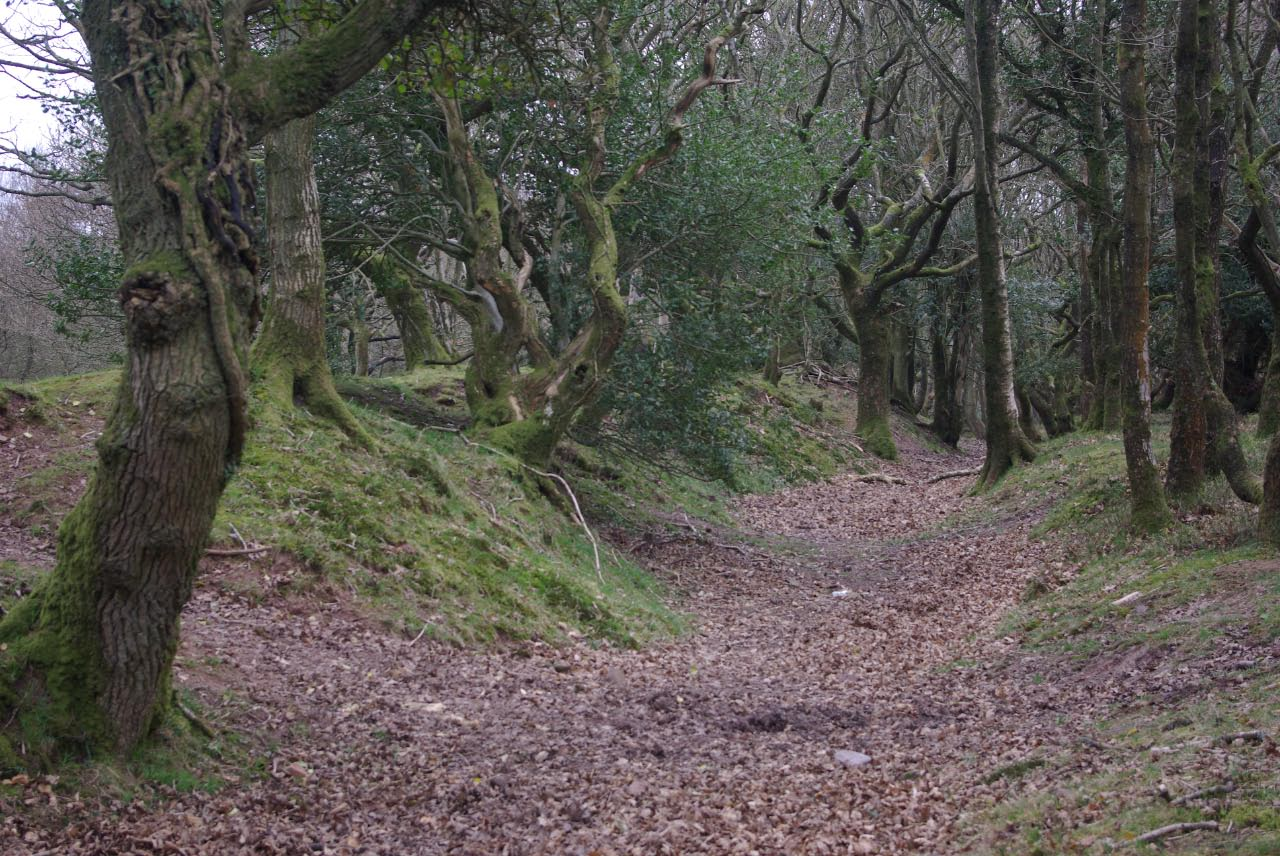
Dead Woman's Ditch

Dead Woman's Ditch is an earthwork which has been scheduled as an ancient monument in Over Stowey, Somerset, England situated on the Quantock Hills.

A linear earthwork consisting of a bank with a ditch along the west side running for approximately 950 metres (3,120 ft) from a spring known as Lady's Fountain across Robin Uprights Hill and down into Ramscombe. The earthwork is presumed to be of prehistoric origin and is of unknown purpose, but has been linked to Dowsborough.

The 1 kilometre (0.62 mi) long earthwork has been cut through by later tracks and a road. It is badly eroded in places and is on the Heritage at Risk Register. Part of the earthwork is on land owned by the Forestry Commission.

Dead Woman's Ditch is sometimes associated with the murder of Jane Walford by her husband John in 1789 but the name predates the murder, appearing on an earlier map. In 1988 the body of Shirley Banks was found 1 mile from the site; John Cannan was found guilty of her murder.

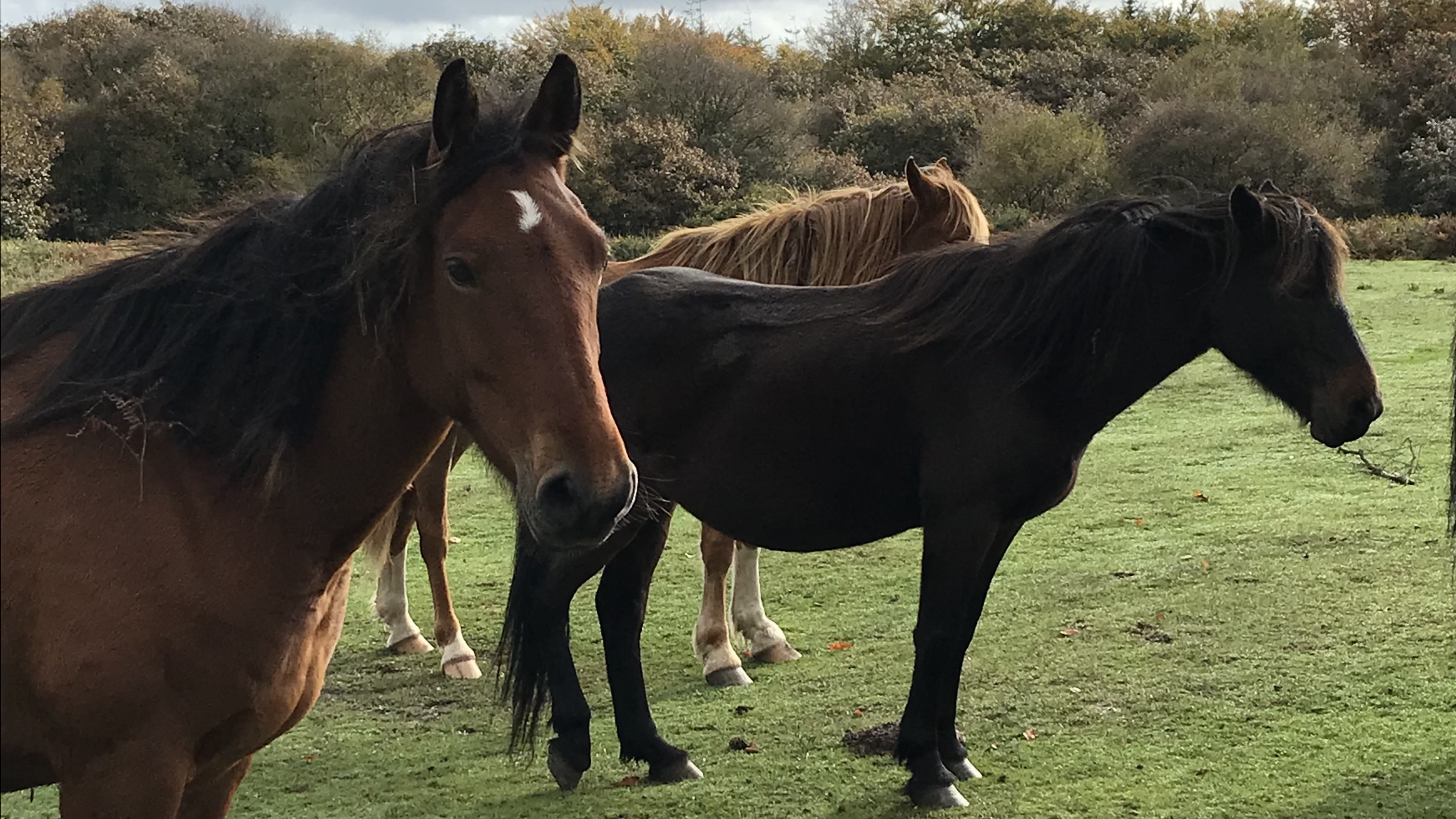
Wild horses in the carpark of Dead Woman's Ditch
