= Gemma McCluskie =

English actress (1983–2012)

- Born: Gemma Rose Veronica McCluskie; 5 February 1983; London, England
- Died: 1 March 2012 (aged 29); Hackney, England
- Cause of death: Beating
- Body discovered: 6 March 2012; Regent's Canal, Hackney, London
- Occupation: Actress
- Years active: 1997–2001
- Notable work: EastEnders
- Height: 4 ft 11 in (150 cm)
- Relatives: Tony McCluskie; Anthony McCluskie; Danny McCluskie

Gemma Rose Veronica McCluskie (5 February 1983 – 1 March 2012) was an English actress. She played Kerry Skinner in the BBC soap opera EastEnders between 2000 and 2001.

In March 2012, McCluskie disappeared from her home in East London. A few days later, her dismembered body was discovered in the Regent's Canal. In January 2013, her brother, Tony McCluskie, was found guilty of her murder.

== Career ==
McCluskie made her acting debut as Janis in the CBBC children's television series No Sweat in 1997. She played Kerry Skinner in the BBC soap opera EastEnders between October 2000 and February 2001. Kerry Skinner was a close friend of Zoe Slater (Michelle Ryan), the great-niece of the recently killed off Ethel Skinner (Gretchen Franklin), and girlfriend of long-time character Robbie Jackson (Dean Gaffney).

== Disappearance and discovery of body ==
McCluskie went missing from her East London flat, where she lived with her brother Tony, on 1 March 2012. She was seen at home with her brother that afternoon, and a subsequent investigation found that she had entered a kebab shop around 8 pm.

A search party of 100 people was organised by McCluskie's cousins on 5 March, which spread out from the east and south of London.

Her headless torso was found in the Regents Canal on 6 March. On 10 March, a 35-year-old male (later identified as her brother, Tony McCluskie) was charged with her murder. He appeared at Thames Magistrates' Court on 12 March and a preliminary hearing was set for 26 March at the Old Bailey.

On 10 September, police found McCluskie's severed head in the same stretch of canal.

McCluskie's funeral was held on 30 November at St Monica's Roman Catholic Church, Hoxton Square, East London.

== Trial and sentence of brother ==
The trial began on 14 January 2013 at the Old Bailey. During the trial, it was reported that Tony McCluskie was a heavy cannabis user and that the siblings frequently argued. On 1 March 2012, he allegedly argued with his sister about an overflowing bath. She told him to leave, and he then grabbed her by the wrists and punched her to the floor, but claimed he had no further recollection of his actions. Her death was caused by several blows to the head with a blunt instrument. He spent several hours dismembering her body. CCTV footage showed him carrying a suitcase the next day; the suitcase contained her remains, which he disposed of in the Regents Park Canal. Tony McCluskie initially admitted manslaughter, but denied murder, citing a "loss of control". He was found guilty of her murder on 30 January 2013 and sentenced to life imprisonment with a minimum sentence of 20 years.

A 2017 episode of Crimes That Shook Britain covered Gemma McCluskie's murder, as did a 2018 episode of Evidence of Evil.

== Filmography ==
Year	Title	Role	Notes	Ref.
1997	No Sweat	Janis	4 episodes	
2000–2001	EastEnders	Kerry Skinner	Series regular; 41 episodes	

== See also ==
- Lists of solved missing person cases
