= Day parole =

Type of prisoner release in Canadian law

Day parole is a form of release under Canadian law that permits prisoner participation in public activities during the day, and requires they return to their prison or halfway house nightly. The Parole Board of Canada may waive this requirement, or choose to impose additional conditions. This is often preparatory for statutory release or full parole.

== Eligibility ==
In Canada, a prisoner serving a sentence of two years or longer is eligible to apply for day parole six months prior to eligibility for full parole, or after six months (whichever is greater). Those serving life or indeterminate sentences are eligible to apply for day parole after three years, or three years before full parole eligibility (whichever is greater).
