= Christopher Berry-Dee =

British true crime writer

Christopher Berry-Dee (born 1948) is a British writer, whom The Guardian has called "the UK's all-time bestselling true crime author", with book sales of almost one million, over three decades. According to The Guardian, he has received multiple accusations of assault and child sexual abuse.. Following the publication of the Guardian report in August 2026, the publisher Bonnier Books and the bookseller Waterstones removed his books from sale

Berry-Dee is the founder and former director of the Criminology Research Institute (CRI), and the former publisher and editor in chief of The Criminologist.

He was born Christopher Dee in Winchester in 1948. He began as an artist, painting naval scenes in and around Portsmouth, his home town.

In 1982, he was convicted for forgery and served a one-year sentence in Ford open prison, Sussex. In 1988, he was convicted for "obtaining credit and evading liability while an undischarged bankrupt."

He had two daughters with his second wife, Tracey Dee. In the early 1990s, they lived in Curdridge, near Winchester, Hampshire.

== Publications ==
- Talking with Serial Killers: The Most Evil People in the World Tell Their Own Stories, John Blake 2003
- Berry-Dee, Christopher (10 May 2011). Cannibal Serial Killers: Profiles of Depraved Flesh-Eating Murderers. Ulysses Press. ISBN 978-1-56975-902-8.
- Inside the Mind of Jeffrey Dahmer: The Cannibal Killer, Gemini 2022, 9781913543310
- Talking With Psychopaths: A journey into the evil mind, John Blake 2024, 9781789467956
- Berry-Dee, Christopher (5 September 2019). Talking With Psychopaths and Savages: Beyond Evil: From the UK's No. 1 True Crime author. Bonnier Books UK. ISBN 978-1-78946-116-9.
- Berry-Dee, Christopher (7 July 2008). Prime Suspect - The True Story of John Cannan, The Only Man the Police Want to Investigate for the Murder of Suzy Lamplugh. Kings Road Publishing. ISBN 978-1-78219-580-1.
