= East Prawle =

Village in south Devon, England

Coordinates: 50.2151°N 3.7097°W

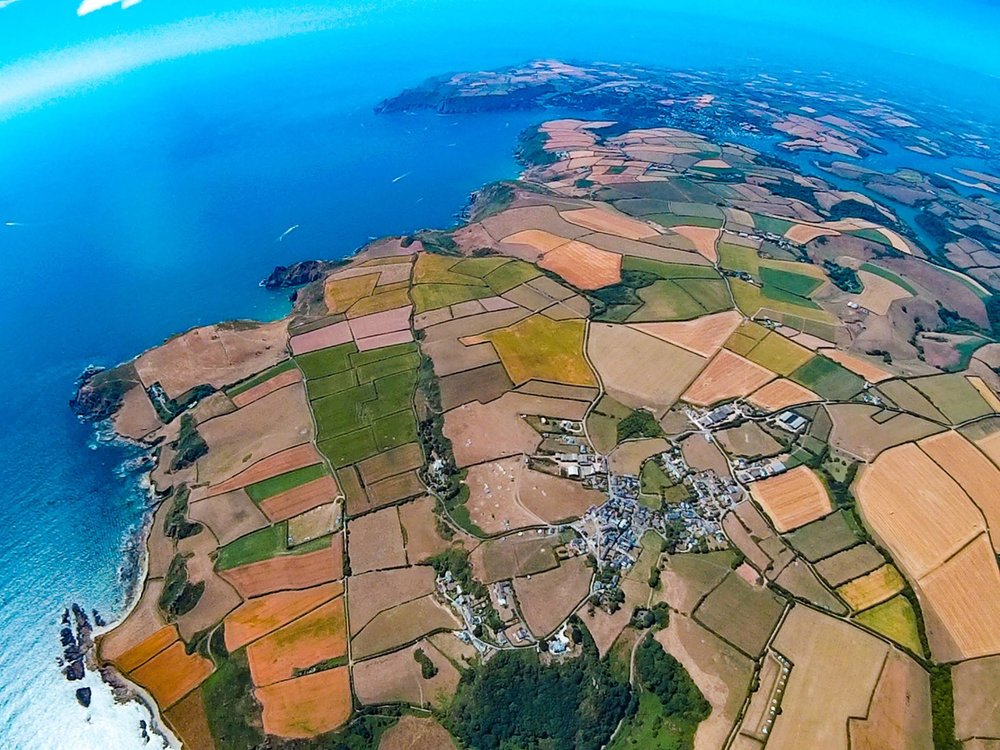
- View of East Prawle

- Location within Devon
- Civil parish: Chivelstone
- District: South Hams
- Shire county: Devon
- Region: South West
- Country: England
- Sovereign state: United Kingdom
- Police: Devon and Cornwall
- Fire: Devon and Somerset
- Ambulance: South Western

East Prawle is a village in the civil parish of Chivelstone, in the South Hams district of Devon, England. It is situated on the coast south east of Salcombe, near the most southerly tip of Devon, Prawle Point.

Mentioned in the Domesday Book, the village's name comes from the Anglo-Saxon word Præwhyll meaning 'lookout place'. The area, being Devon's most southerly point, has served as a lookout since ancient times, which perfectly fits the name's meaning. East Prawle is primarily a farming settlement, the village has seen little development.

During the First World War an airfield was constructed just outside the village.

World War I (specifically 1918-1919):

- The airfield was opened in 1917 to provide a base for de Havilland DH.6 and de Havilland DH.9s of the Royal Naval Air Service to carry out anti-submarine patrols.

World War II:

- While Prawle Point itself became a radar/ROTOR site with support staff rather than large flying squadrons, nearby airfields like RAF Chivenor hosted various squadrons, including potentially No. 254 Squadron (Beaufighters) in the post-war period, but the core Prawle site was for radar during the war years.

So, for the classic "squadron" name at Prawle, think 254 Squadron (WWI), but for WWII, it was more about radar operations at the point itself.

Prawle Point (immediately south of the village) forms part of the Prawle Point & Start Point SSSI — a biologically and geologically important stretch of coast. The cliffs and soft head deposits make the site nationally important for solitary bees and wasps (over 100 species recorded), rare mason-wasps and cuckoo-bees, and also support species like the cirl bunting and rich lichen communities. If you’re into wildlife, the headland and South West Coastal Path are outstanding.

The National Coastwatch Institution (NCI) operates at Prawle Point (visitor information, lookout); the NCI site gives practical access instructions and a local postcode for the lookout. Good resource if you plan to visit the headland.

The village retains a green, a duck pond, a village shop, a cafe a pizza restaurant and bar and The Pigs Nose (a historic pub) plus seasonal campsites and holiday lets. It’s a small but active community with events, fairs and a history society. In summer the village green and nearby fields attract walkers and campers; outside high season it’s very quiet.

== Notable residents ==
- Jennie Bond, journalist and broadcaster
- Hugh Edwards (1878–1952), author
