= Percival Appleby =

Canadian flying ace

Percival Ewart Appleby
- Born: 27 June 1894; Cape Breton, Nova Scotia, Canada
- Died: May 1968 (aged 73–74); Middleton, Nova Scotia
- Military career
- Allegiance: Canada; United Kingdom
- Branch: Canadian Expeditionary Force; British Army; Royal Air Force; Royal Canadian Air Force
- Service years: 1914–1919; 1941–1944
- Rank: Second Lieutenant
- Units: 66th Regiment, Canadian Militia; Canadian Army Medical Corps, CEF; King's Royal Rifle Corps; No. 10 Balloon Section, RFC; No. 104 Squadron RAF; No. 1 School of Aeronautics, RAF; No. 3 Training Depot Station, RAF
- Conflicts: World War I; Western Front; World War II
- Awards: Distinguished Flying Cross

Second Lieutenant Percival Ewart Appleby DFC (27 June 1894 – May 1968) was a Canadian World War I flying ace credited with six aerial victories.

== Early life and background ==
Appleby was born in Nova Scotia, Canada, the second child, and eldest son, of the eleven children born to Jabez Appleby and his wife Minnie Eugenia (née Dakin). His father was a Wesleyan Minister, born in New Invention, Shropshire, England, while his mother was born in Sandy Cove, Nova Scotia. When Appleby signed up for military service he gave his birthplace as Cape Breton, while other sources list Advocate Harbour and Port La Tour as his place of birth. He was educated at Lunenburg, Halifax County Academy, and Mount Allison University.

== Military service ==
Appleby enlisted into the Canadian Expeditionary Force for overseas service on 25 September 1914 at Valcartier, Quebec. He was then 20 years and 2 months old, 5 ft 7 in (1.70 m) tall, unmarried, and gave his occupation as draftsman. He had previously served in the 66th Regiment of the Militia, and gave his father's name as his next of kin, who was then resident in North Street, Halifax.

He was posted to No. 1 Stationary Hospital as a member of the Canadian Army Medical Corps, and sailed for England on 3 October 1914. Appleby served in Near East from 1 August 1915 to 6 November 1916, receiving promotions to lance corporal on 13 April 1916, and to sergeant on 22 June. He then returned to England, and was under instruction at the No. 2 Officers Cadet Battalion, Pembroke College, Cambridge, from 23 December 1916 to 25 April 1917. Appleby was commissioned as a second lieutenant, and attached to the King's Royal Rifle Corps on 26 April, and was struck off the strength of CEF the same day.

Appleby transferred to the Royal Flying Corps on 27 January 1918, and was assigned to No. 10 Balloon Section, Southern Training Brigade, the next day. On 1 April 1918, the RFC was merged with the Royal Naval Air Service to form the Royal Air Force. Appleby was transferred to the headquarters of the Southern Training Brigade on 1 May 1918, and then joined No. 104 Squadron RAF on 17 May, being appointed an observer officer on 25 June. Flying as an observer/gunner in Airco DH.9 bombers, he was credited with six victories over enemy aircraft between 1 July and 15 September 1918, all but one with Richard Gammon as his pilot. On 1 November 1918 Appleby and Gammon were both awarded the Distinguished Flying Cross following a particularly hazardous attack by 21 aircraft from No.'s 104 and 99 Squadrons on the Badische Anilin und Sodafabrik factory at Mannheim on 7 September, during which they accounted for three enemy aircraft. Their citation read:

Lieutenant (Temporary Captain) Richard John Gammon.
Second Lieutenant Percival Ewart Appleby.

"Captain Gammon, with Second Lieutenant Appleby as Observer, was the leader of two formations (ten machines in all) on a recent raid. En route the formation was attacked by fifteen hostile aircraft; having driven these off, they reached the objective, which was successfully bombed. While thus engaged the formation was fiercely attacked by fifteen enemy machines, which continued the attack for some distance on the return journey, until they were driven off. Upon nearing our lines the formation was again assailed by seven machines; in the engagement that ensued one of these was destroyed and two driven down by Captain Gammon and his Observer, and, in addition, three others were destroyed by our other machines. The officer who led the whole of the combined formations of this raid speaks in the highest terms of Captain Gammon's leadership and skilful co-operation. Second Lieutenant Appleby was of the greatest assistance to Captain Gammon throughout, keeping him informed of the movements and manoeuvres of the hostile machines. This officer has taken part in numerous raids, displaying on all occasions great keenness and determination."

Appleby was transferred to the Home Establishment on 21 October 1918, serving at the No. 1 School of Aeronautics from 18 November 1918, and No. 3 Training Depot Station from 5 May 1919. He was posted to the Repatriation Camp at Upavon on 18 May, and was transferred to the RAF unemployed list on 12 July 1919.

=== List of aerial victories ===
Combat record
No.	Date/Time	Aircraft/ Serial No.	Opponent	Result	Location	Notes
1	1 July 1918 @ 0720	DH.9 (C6204)	Albatros D.V	Out of control	Metz	Pilot: Captain Richard Gammon
2	1 August 1918 @ about 0830	DH.9	Pfalz D.III	Destroyed	Boulay	Pilot: Captain Richard Gammon
3	11 August 1918 @ 0910	DH.9	Albatros D.III	Out of control	Karlsruhe	Pilot: Lieutenant E. Cartwright
4	7 September 1918 @ 1230	DH.9 (C6264)	Fokker D.VII	Destroyed in flames	Saverne	Pilot: Captain Richard Gammon
5	7 September 1918 @ 1400	DH.9 (C6264)	Fokker D.VII	Destroyed	Saverne—Landau	Pilot: Captain Richard Gammon
6	15 September 1918 @ 1105	DH.9 (C6264)	Pfalz D.III	Destroyed	Metz	Pilot: Captain Richard Gammon

== Post-war career ==
Appleby married Ruth Graham Parsons in Lawrencetown, Nova Scotia, in 1922. He returned to military service during World War II serving as a recruiting officer in the Royal Canadian Air Force from 30 May 1941 until 25 November 1944.
