= Chivelstone =

Village in Devon, England

Coordinates: 50.23°N 3.70°W

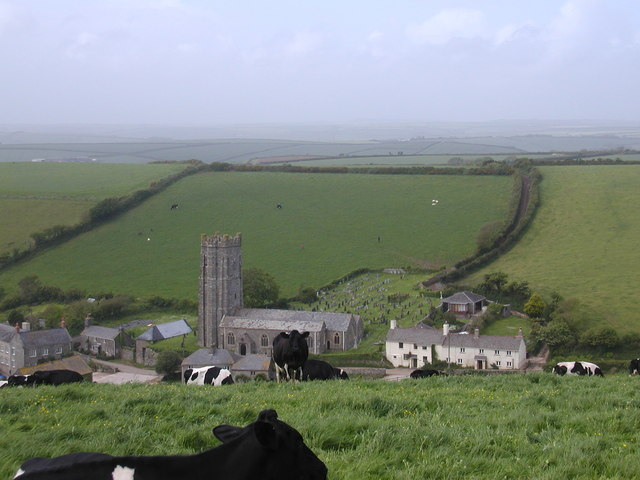
- The village of Chivelstone and the Church of St Sylvester

- Location within Devon
- Population: 280 (2011 census)
- Civil parish: Chivelstone
- District: South Hams
- Shire county: Devon
- Region: South West
- Country: England
- Sovereign state: United Kingdom

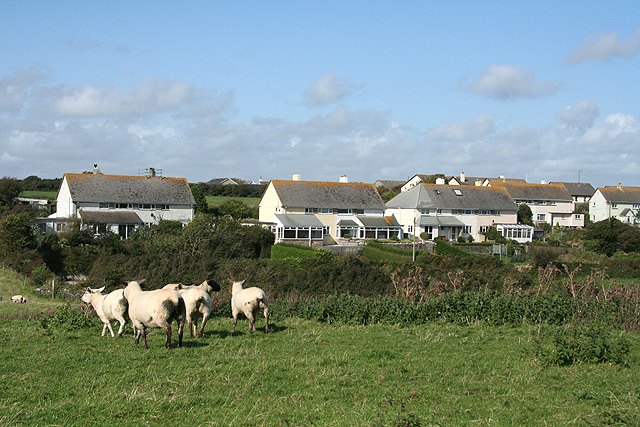
Housing in East Prawle

Chivelstone is a village and civil parish in Devon, England. The parish contains the villages of East Prawle and South Allington as well as the hamlets of Ford and Lannacombe. The population of the parish taken at the 2011 census was 280.

== Etymology ==
The name of Chivelstone is derived from Coefel's farm, whilst the name of East Prawle is most likely derived from Præwhyll, which is an Anglo-Saxon term for a look-out hill.

== History ==
The names of the villages in the parish were first recorded in the Domesday Book in 1086. The 1086 survey recorded three manors in the future Chivelstone parish, all of which were held by Juhel de Totnes (died 1123/30).

It is generally believed that the country was divided into ecclesiastical parishes around 1200. The church parish of Chivelstone was focused on the church dedicated to St Silvester, the only church dedicated to that saint in Devon, which is the mediaeval dedication to St Mary.

== Description ==
The parish comprises the villages of East Prawle and South Allington and the hamlets of Ford and Lannacombe. A coastal parish on the southernmost tip of land of Devon, Prawle Point, it has an area of 10 km^{2}. It is an Area of Outstanding Natural Beauty, Coastal Preservation Area, Heritage Coast, Site of Special Scientific Interest as well as several other preservation areas. The parish has 220 households, most of which are located in East Prawle.

== Location ==
Chivelstone is located in the South Hams local government district in Devon, England. It is surrounded by the parishes of East Portlemouth to the west, South Pool to the northwest and Stokenham to the north and east. It borders the sea to the south and southeast.
