= Start Point transmitting station =

Broadcasting facility in Devon, England

Start Point
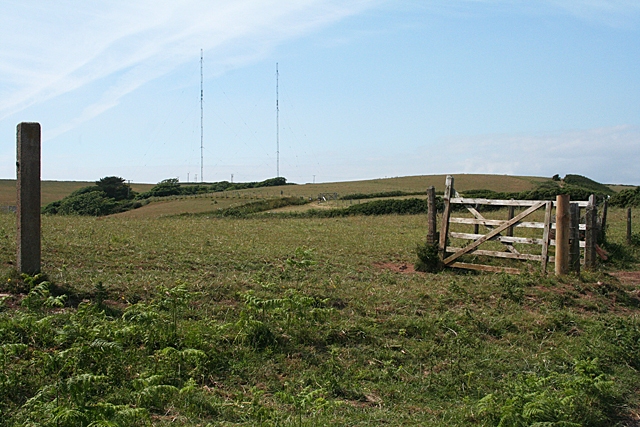

- Location within Devon
- Location: Start Point, Devon
- Mast height: 137 metres (449 ft)
- Coordinates: 50.228333°N 3.664167°W
- Grid reference: SX8131437875
- Built: 1939

The Start Point transmitting station is a broadcasting facility at Start Point, Devon, owned by Arqiva. The site is just north-west of the Start Point Lighthouse.

The station currently transmits a single broadcast: BBC Radio 5 Live on 693 kHz.

== History ==
=== 1930s ===
In 1935 the BBC started looking for transmitter sites to improve radio coverage in Devon, Dorset and Cornwall. After investigating 23 sites and carrying out extensive tests, two sites were selected: Start Point and Clevedon in Somerset. Start Point came on air on 14 June 1939 using an ST&C type C100 100 kW transmitter on 1050 kHz, and broadcast the West of England regional programme. A directional aerial array was used to avoid wasting power over the English Channel and to enhance the signal to the east and west. It consisted of two 137 metres (449 ft) stayed lattice masts, one being a mast radiator and the other a parasitic reflector. Both masts had a break at 94.5 metres (310 ft) to allow for the insertion of a loading coil.

The station obtained power from two 11 kV mains feeders and a 400 kW diesel alternator.

The building design followed L. Rome Guthrie's earlier work at the Brookmans Park transmitting station. By agreement, the BBC obtained copyright in the Brookmans Park elevation drawings and was able to follow them, with changes to allow for building size, for several other sites.

The station closed on 1 September 1939, in anticipation of the outbreak of war between Britain and Germany two days later.

=== World War II ===
In October 1939 BBC Research engineers experimented with horizontally-polarised transmissions at Start Point. The idea was to see if broadcasts could be made without providing enemy aircraft with a navigational radio beacon. A horizontal dipole antenna was suspended between the two masts. The test was reasonably successful and between 18 February and 15 September 1940 regular transmission were carried in the evenings, on 877 kHz, of what became the "Forces' Programme".

A Marconi SWB18 short wave transmitter (Sender 22) was added to the station to carry the Home Service on 6075 kHz, from 20 January 1940. This was intended to provide coverage where the mediumwave signals were poor, and to provide an emergency backup to the landline distribution network in case of major disruption. This transmitter also carried the European Service (Norwegian) at certain times.

In October 1940, the station began to transmit the European Service on 1050 kHz. This also used a horizontally-polarised antenna. The transmitter's power was increased to 180 kW, with a consequent increase in audio distortion.

=== Post-1945 ===
The station carried the West of England Home Service on 977 kHz from 29 July 1945. In 1967 the Home Service became Radio 4. By 1978, Start Point had moved to 1052 kHz. On 23 November 1978 there was a major reorganisation of the medium wave band in Europe, and from that date the station transmitted Radio 1 on 1053 kHz.

=== Mast Stay Failure ===
On 12 January 2016 one of the top stays of the northern mast at Start Point snapped, the point of failure being the highest in-line insulator on the stay. This caused the mast to lean towards the south. On 21 January 2016, the damaged northern mast was demolished.

A new mast has been built to replace the demolished.

Until the new mast had been finished, the West Prawle transmitter was used.

== Services available ==
=== Analogue radio (AM medium wave) ===
| Frequency | kW | Service |
|---|---|---|
| 693 kHz | 80 | BBC Radio 5 Live |
