= William Thomas Smith =

British flying ace

- Born: 21 October 1896; Lambeth, London, England
- Died: October 1994 (aged 97–98); Australia
- Military career
- Allegiance: United Kingdom; Australia
- Branch: British Army; Royal Air Force; Royal Australian Air Force
- Service years: 1914–c.1918 1940–1946
- Rank: Flight Sergeant
- Units: Royal Engineers; No. 45 Squadron RFC; No. 104 Squadron RAF
- Conflicts: World War I; Western Front; World War II
- Awards: Distinguished Conduct Medal; Military Medal

Flight Sergeant William Thomas Smith DCM, MM (21 October 1896 – October 1994) was a British World War I flying ace credited with five aerial victories.

== World War I ==
Smith enlisted into the Royal Engineers in 1914 with the rank of pioneer, and on 9 December 1916 was awarded the Military Medal "for bravery in the Field".

He then transferred to the Royal Flying Corps, serving in No. 45 Squadron RFC. He gained his first aerial victory on 11 August 1917 by shooting down in flames an Albatros D.V over Deûlémont from a Sopwith 1½ Strutter piloted by Captain J. Pender. On 19 October 1917 Smith was awarded the Distinguished Conduct Medal. His citation was published on 25 January 1918 and read:

48027 Pioneer W. T. Smith, Royal Engineers, attached Royal Flying Corps.

"For conspicuous gallantry and devotion to duty whilst acting as aerial gunner to an officer. Having shot down an enemy machine, his own pilot was wounded, and fell forward insensible on to the control lever. Pioneer Smith then climbed forward along the plane, pulled the pilot off the lever and got the machine under control. The officer then partially recovered, whereupon he remained standing on the side of the fuselage shouting words of encouragement to him, and the machine was eventually landed without much damage, entirely owing to his exceptionally gallant and prompt action."

It would be exactly a year after his first that his second victory was gained, and by then he was serving in No. 104 Squadron RAF, part of the Independent Air Force, flying in an Airco DH.4 piloted by Captain Jeffrey Home-Hay. In five days the pair accounted for four Albatros D.Vs; the first, on 11 August 1918, was driven down out of control over Karlsruhe. On 13 August they destroyed and drove down two more near Corny, and finally on 15 August drove down another at Château-Salins.

== Later career ==
Post-war, Smith emigrated to Australia and was living in St. Kilda when he joined the Royal Australian Air Force at Melbourne on 11 April 1940. He served in the RAAF throughout the war and was eventually demobbed on 24 October 1946 with the rank of Flight Sergeant.
