= Start Point, Devon =

Headland on the south coast of Devon, England

Start Point
- Promontory
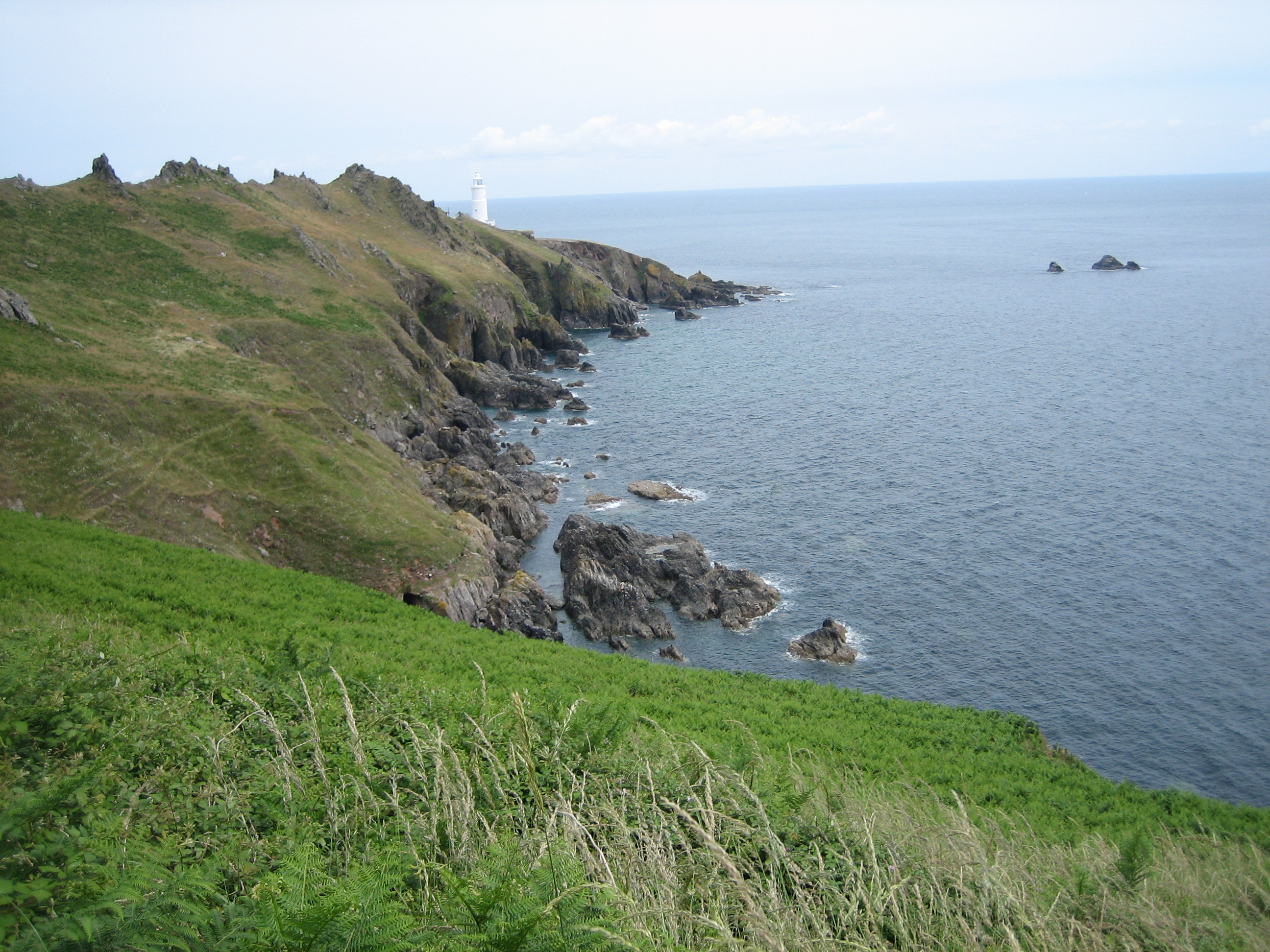
- View east, including Start Point Lighthouse in mid-picture.

- Location within Devon
- Coordinates: 50.221767°N 3.641213°W
- Grid position: SX832370

Start Point is a promontory in the South Hams district in Devon, England, grid reference SX832370. Close to the most southerly point in the county, it marks the southern limit of Start Bay, which extends northwards to the estuary of the River Dart.

The rocks of the point are greenschist and mica-schist, formed by metamorphism of Devonian sediments during a period of mountain building towards the end of the Carboniferous period.

The name "Start" derives from an Anglo-Saxon word steort, meaning a tail. This root also appears in the names of birds with distinctive tails, like the redstart.

== Features ==
As a result of the many shipwrecks in the area, Start Point lighthouse was built in 1836 to alert ships to the danger of the point and its surrounding rocks. The lighthouse and the area's birdlife make it a popular spot for visitors, and Start Point is accessible to walkers from the South West Coast Path.

The Start Point transmitting station is located on top of the promontory, just north-west of the lighthouse. Built in 1939, it nowadays transmits only a single broadcast, BBC Radio 5 Live.

== See also ==
- Prawle Point
- Prawle Point and Start Point Site of Special Scientific Interest
