= Project Emily =

British deployment of PGM-17 Thor ballistic missiles

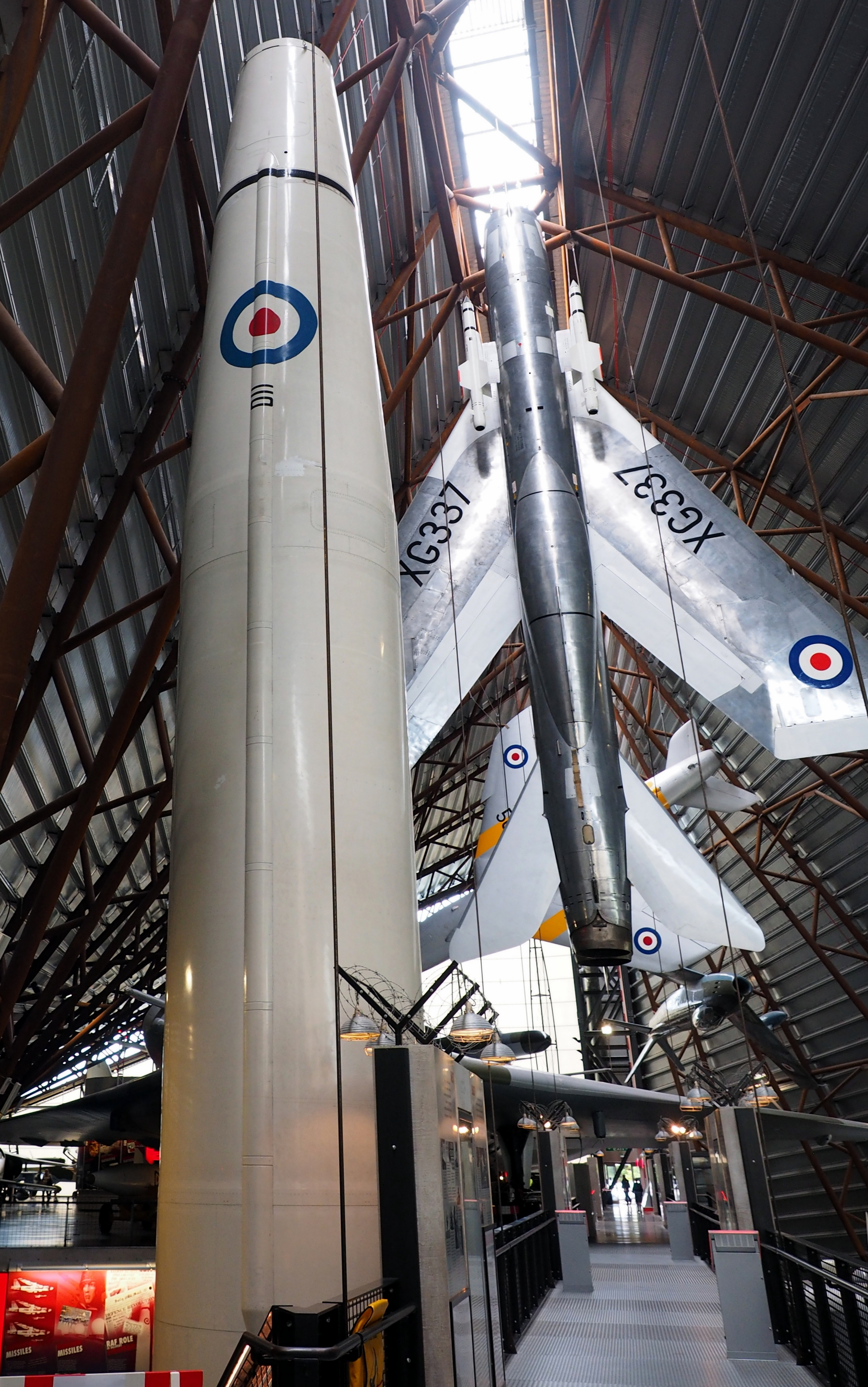
- Thor missile T-110 (left of English Electric Lightning) in RAF Museum Cosford
- Commercial?: No
- Type of project: Missile deployments
- Country: United Kingdom
- Prime Minister(s): Harold Macmillan
- Key people: Dwight D. Eisenhower
- Established: 1959
- Disestablished: 1963

Project Emily was the deployment of American-built Thor intermediate-range ballistic missiles (IRBMs) in the United Kingdom between 1959 and 1963. Royal Air Force (RAF) Bomber Command operated 60 Thor missiles, dispersed to 20 RAF air stations, as part of the British nuclear deterrent.

Due to concerns over the buildup of Soviet missiles, US President Dwight D. Eisenhower met Prime Minister Harold Macmillan in Bermuda in March 1957 to explore the possibility of short-term deployment of IRBMs in the United Kingdom until the long-range intercontinental ballistic missiles (ICBMs) were deployed. The October 1957 Sputnik crisis caused this plan to be expedited. The first Thor missile arrived in the UK on a Douglas C-124 Globemaster II transport aircraft in August 1958, and was delivered to the RAF in September.

RAF crews periodically visited the United States for training, culminating in 21 operational training launches from Vandenberg Air Force Base. During the Cuban Missile Crisis in October 1962, 59 of the missiles, with their W49 1.44-megaton-of-TNT (6.0 PJ) thermonuclear warheads, were brought to operational readiness. The Thor missile force was disbanded in 1963, and the missiles were returned to the United States, where most were expended in military space shots.

== Background ==
During the early part of the Second World War, Britain had a nuclear weapons project, codenamed Tube Alloys. At the Quebec Conference in August 1943, the prime minister of the United Kingdom, Winston Churchill and the president of the United States, Franklin Roosevelt, signed the Quebec Agreement, which merged Tube Alloys with the American Manhattan Project to create a combined British, American and Canadian project. The British government trusted that the United States would continue to share nuclear technology, which it regarded as a joint discovery, after the war, but the United States Atomic Energy Act of 1946 (McMahon Act) ended technical cooperation. Its control of "restricted data" prevented the United States' allies from receiving information related to nuclear weapons. Fearing a resurgence of United States isolationism, and Britain losing its great power status, the British government restarted its own development effort, which was codenamed High Explosive Research. The first British atomic bomb was successfully detonated off the Monte Bello Islands in Operation Hurricane on 3 October 1952, and the first production model atomic bomb was delivered to the Royal Air Force (RAF) in November 1953.

Britain's nuclear weapons armament was initially based on free-fall bombs delivered by the V bomber force, but the possibility of the bomber becoming obsolete by the late 1960s was foreseen. In 1953, the assistant chief of the Air Staff (Operational Requirements), Air Vice Marshal Geoffrey Tuttle, asked for a specification for a ballistic missile with 2,000-nautical-mile (3,700 km) range to be drawn up ahead of design work commencing. This became Operational Requirement OR.1139. Work commenced at the Royal Aircraft Establishment in Farnborough later that year. In March 1954 the Ministry of Supply was asked to put forward proposals for a full-scale ballistic missile project. At a NATO meeting in Paris in December 1953, the United States Secretary of Defense, Charles E. Wilson, raised the possibility of a joint development programme with the minister of supply, Duncan Sandys. Talks were held in June 1954, resulting in the signing of an agreement on 12 August 1954. The United States would develop an intercontinental ballistic missile (ICBM) of 5,000-nautical-mile (9,300 km) range, while the United Kingdom with United States support would develop a medium-range ballistic missile (MRBM) of 2,000-nautical-mile (3,700 km) range. The American ICBM was codenamed Atlas, while the British MRBM was called Blue Streak. Blue Streak was estimated to cost £70 million, with the United States paying 15 per cent of the cost.

In parallel to the ICBM programme, the United States developed three separate intermediate range ballistic missile (IRBM) systems. On 8 November 1955, Wilson approved IRBM projects by both the United States Army and the United States Air Force (USAF). The United States National Security Council gave the ICBM and IRBM projects the highest national priority. The Army Ballistic Missile Agency, commanded by Major General John B. Medaris, with Wernher von Braun as its technical director, developed the Jupiter (SM-78) IRBM. After three failures, its first successful flight took place at the Cape Canaveral Air Force Station on 31 May 1957. The United States Navy initially participated in the Jupiter programme, intending to launch the missiles from ships, but in view of their size, decided instead to develop a smaller, solid-propellant IRBM that could be launched from a submarine, which became Polaris. Despite reluctance on the part of Major General Bernard Schriever, the commander of the USAF Western Development Division, to take on IRBM development, and a pronounced lack of enthusiasm for missiles among senior USAF officers, who preferred manned bombers, the rival USAF project moved quickly. The Douglas Aircraft Company was awarded the contract for the development of the missile, which was codenamed Thor (SM-75), in December 1955. Rocketdyne, Ramo-Wooldridge, AC Spark Plug, Bell Laboratories and General Electric were engaged as the subcontractors for the rocket engine, technical coordination, inertial guidance system, radio guidance system, and re-entry vehicle respectively. The first missile was delivered to Patrick Air Force Base on 26 October 1956. After four unsuccessful attempts, the first successful test flight took place on 20 September 1957.

== Negotiations ==
Implicit in Wilson's decision to develop an IRBM was that it would be based overseas. Thor had a range of 1,500 nautical miles (2,800 km; 1,700 mi), and therefore did not have the range to reach the Soviet Union and China from the United States. Britain, Germany, Turkey, the Philippines, Taiwan, South Korea and Japan were considered as possible sites for deploying Thor IRBMs. Gordon Gray, the US Assistant Secretary of Defense for International Security Affairs, mentioned it to a Ministry of Supply official in January 1956, and unofficial, low-level approaches began in March 1956. The United States Secretary of the Air Force, Donald A. Quarles, officially raised the matter with the minister of defence, Sir Walter Monckton, and his Chief Scientific Advisor, Sir Frederick Brundrett, in meetings at the Palace of Westminster on 16 and 17 July 1956. Quarles proposed sites in England for the missiles, and suggested that live firings be conducted from Scotland. Monckton noted that this option had already been rejected for Blue Streak, in favour of test firings at the Woomera Test Range. Monckton and Brundrett considered whether Thor or Jupiter would have the range for British purposes. The Americans could not supply nuclear weapons under the McMahon Act. The missiles could be fitted with British warheads, but these would be heavier, reducing the range to 1,250 nautical miles (2,320 km; 1,440 mi). Brundrett considered such a missile "useless". The chairman of the Chiefs of Staff Committee, Marshal of the Royal Air Force Sir William Dickson, queried whether Blue Streak was redundant if the Americans supplied Thor. Like many senior RAF officers and their USAF counterparts, he was also concerned about the fate of the manned bomber if the government embraced missile technology.

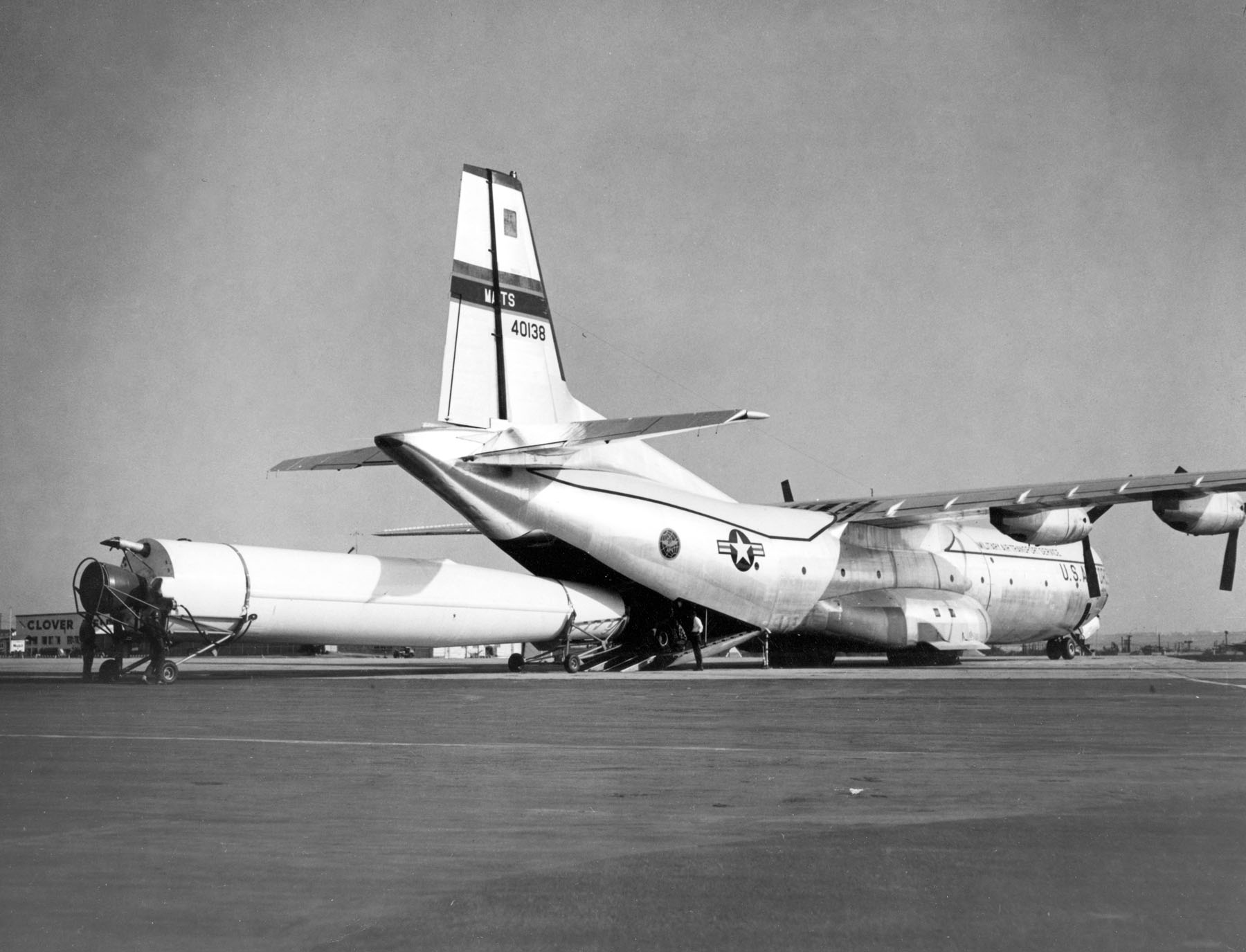
A Thor missile is loaded onto a Douglas C-133 Cargomaster transport aircraft

During the initial negotiations, the major British concerns were about the technical aspects of the weapons, and the costs and benefits of deployment in the United Kingdom rather than concerns about control. A precedent here was Project E, under which data on US nuclear weapons was supplied to Britain to allow English Electric Canberra bombers and V-bombers to carry them in wartime. The McMahon act was amended in August 1954 to permit this. Under Project E, stocks of US nuclear weapons for British use were held at RAF airbases under US custody. On 12 December 1956, the chief of staff of the United States Air Force, General Nathan Twining, suggested to his British counterpart, Air Chief Marshal Sir Dermot Boyle, that the Thor missile warheads be made available "under the same terms and conditions". Sandys, now the minister of defence, affirmed that this arrangement would be acceptable to the British government. When he visited the United States in January 1957, he found the Americans eager to deploy IRBMs in Britain. The prime minister, Harold Macmillan, and President Dwight D. Eisenhower agreed to do so at a summit in Bermuda in March 1957. Although the IRBM negotiations had commenced before the Suez Crisis damaged Britain's relationship with the United States, it suited the British government to portray the IRBM deal as a demonstration that the rift had been healed.

However, the two nations were still working at cross-purposes. The British saw the IRBMs as a step on the path to an independent nuclear deterrent, while the Americans saw it as an augmentation of the Strategic Air Command (SAC). The Americans originally envisaged the employment of 120 Thor missiles in four USAF squadrons, the 672nd, 673rd, 674th and 675th Strategic Missile Squadrons, and four RAF squadrons, the first two of which would at first be manned by USAF personnel. The October 1957 Sputnik crisis caused this plan to be modified. It placed the Eisenhower administration under great public pressure to act on the deployment of missiles by a shocked and distraught nation. Sputnik demonstrated the Soviet Union's capability to deploy ICBMs. The United States now needed the IRBMs—and British cooperation—more than ever. The proposal to base USAF Thor squadrons in Britain was dropped on 12 October 1957 in view of the British political opposition.

Colonel Edward N. Hall was responsible for making the arrangements for the deployment. Two alternative plans were presented to Quarles, now the United States Deputy Secretary of Defense. One was for the United States to shoulder the cost, which would facilitate the fastest possible deployment. The other was for an agreement to be reached on sharing costs with the British, which would take longer. Quarles shared the plans with Eisenhower and Macmillan in Bermuda, and directed Hall to proceed with the deployment as fast as the first plan, but with the costs of the second. The result was a slower, more costly deployment. A formal agreement was drawn up on 17 December 1957, although it was not until the end of the month that it was definitely determined that Britain would receive Thor and not Jupiter missiles. The deployment of Thor missiles was codenamed Project Emily.

The USAF suggested that the first missiles be based at RAF Sturgate and RAF East Kirkby in Lincolnshire, where the USAF already had a presence. The RAF rejected this, as it envisaged eventually taking over the bases, and felt that they had too few suitable locations for dispersing the missiles, the local road networks were inadequate, and the personnel accommodation was below RAF standards. Instead, the RAF offered the use of RAF Feltwell in Norfolk and RAF Hemswell in Lincolnshire. The Ministry of Works costed the improvements at £7.15 million. An understanding on the bases was signed by the Ambassador to the United States, Harold Caccia, and the United States Secretary of State, Christian Herter, in February 1958. This was followed by a formal agreement in June. The United States would provide the missiles, spare parts and training for five years of operation. The United Kingdom would provide the bases and supporting facilities.

There were fears that the involvement of the Third Air Force, the American air component based in Britain assigned to NATO, would lead to SACEUR, General Lauris Norstad, controlling the missiles. It was agreed that the missiles would be under British control, and target assignment would be a British responsibility, in conjunction with SAC's British-based 7th Air Division. Nor was the RAF happy with the first units being manned by USAF. It was agreed that they would be manned by the RAF as soon as personnel could be trained to operate the missiles. Each missile was supplied with its own 1.44-megaton-of-TNT (6.0 PJ) Mark 49 warhead. The practical difficulty with US custody of the warheads was that if they were all stored at RAF Lakenheath in Suffolk, it would take up to 57 hours to make the missiles operational. In the end, a dual key system was devised. The RAF key started the missile and the USAF authorisation officer's key armed the warhead. This reduced the launch time to 15 minutes.

== Deployment ==
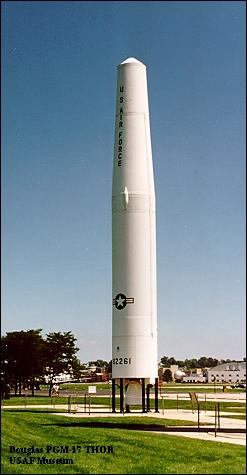
Thor T-150 (USAF serial 58–2261) at the National Museum of the United States Air Force. This missile was once based at RAF Carnaby.

By 1958, plans called for the deployment of 60 Thor missiles. This was conceived as a four-squadron deployment, with each squadron controlling fifteen missiles in five flights of three missiles, with each flight at its own RAF station. No. 77 Squadron RAF was formed at RAF Feltwell as part of No. 3 Group RAF on 1 September 1958. Its first Thor missile arrived at RAF Lakenheath on a Douglas C-124 Globemaster II transport aircraft on 29 August, and was delivered to RAF Feltwell on 19 September. Fourteen were received by 23 December 1958. The deployment involved the transport of 18,000,000 pounds (8,200 t) of equipment by sea, 23,000,000 to 25,000,000 pounds (10,000 to 11,000 t) by air in 600 flights by C-124 Globemaster IIs, and 77 by Douglas C-133 Cargomasters of the USAF's 1607th Air Transport Wing.

Eastern England was dotted with RAF stations that had been used by RAF Bomber Command and the US Eighth Air Force in the Combined Bomber Offensive during the Second World War. Many were still being used by the RAF and USAF, while others had been turned over to other uses but were still in good condition. The use of government-owned land saved the costs of land acquisition. RAF Witchford was initially included at the instigation of the Americans, but the land was owned by the Church Commissioners, and nearby RAF Mepal was substituted. The main selection criterion was the condition of the road network connecting the bases; a grade of more than one in seventeen was considered an unacceptable risk of grounding the missile transport. Some proposed sites in Yorkshire based around RAF Dishforth ran into problems with radar coverage, and a new group of stations was found around RAF North Luffenham. These were not considered ideal as the missiles would have to fly over populated areas.

Training and demonstrations were conducted by Douglas Aircraft engineers, and responsibility for the base was handed over to the RAF in March 1959. In July, it was decided that each of the locations would be designated as a squadron instead of a flight. The flights of No. 77 Squadron became a separate squadron on 22 July 1959. A Flight remained No. 77 Squadron RAF, while B, C, D and E Flights became Nos. 82, 107, 113 and 220 Squadrons RAF respectively.

The subsequent deployment was based on four stations, each comprising five missile squadrons, with a main base and four satellite bases in close proximity. Each missile squadron was equipped with three Thor missiles. The squadrons were allocated to the two RAF Bomber Command groups, Nos. 1 and 3 Groups. The first squadron in No. 1 Group was No. 97 Squadron RAF, which was formed at RAF Hemswell on 1 December 1959. As with No. 77 Squadron, it was broken up into five squadrons on 22 July 1959, with Nos. 104, 106, 142 and 269 Squadrons RAF being formed. No. 98 Squadron RAF was formed at RAF Driffield on 1 August 1959 as part of No. 1 Group on with Nos. 102, 150, 226 and 240 Squadrons RAF as its satellites. Finally, No. 144 Squadron RAF was formed at RAF North Luffenham on 1 December 1959 with Nos. 130, 150, 223 and 254 Squadrons RAF as its satellites as part of No. 3 Group. In all, twenty RAF squadrons were formed between September 1958 and December 1959, more than in any comparable period in peacetime.

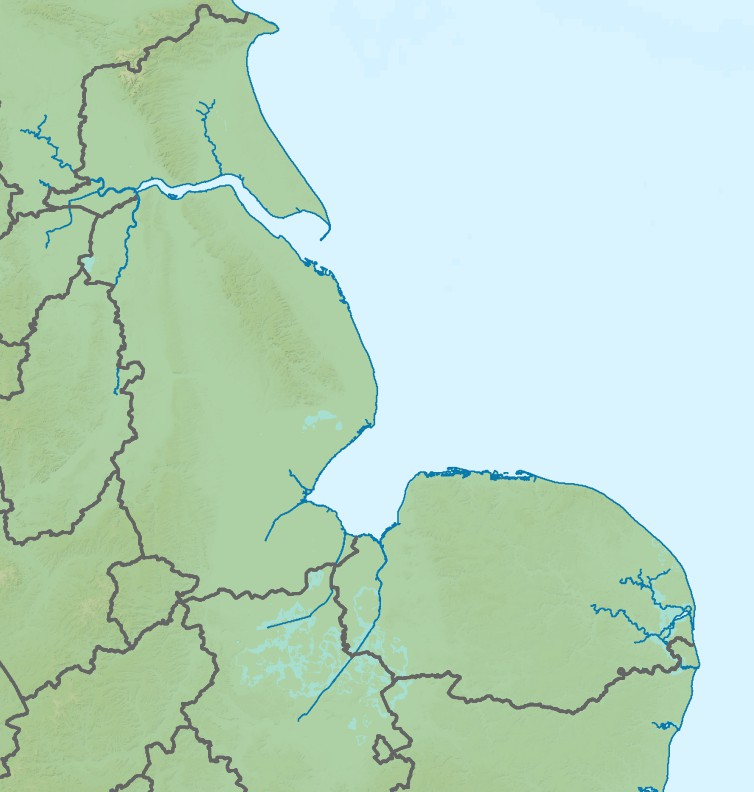
Thor missile deployment showing the main stations (blue) and the satellites (red)

The raising of the twenty squadrons involved the training of 1,254 RAF personnel in the United States, and about the same number in the United Kingdom. Both RAF and USAF personnel were trained in the United States by the 392nd Strategic Missile Squadron (Training), which was formed at Cooke Air Force Base in California on 23 May 1957, (Note: Cooke Air Force Base was renamed Vandenberg Air Force Base on 4 October 1958.) and assigned to the 704th Strategic Missile Wing. Both were assigned to the 1st Missile Division on 22 July. The squadron was renamed the 392nd Missile Training Squadron on 12 August, and was activated on 15 September.

Training was provided by Douglas Aircraft and A. C. Sparkplug at the former's plant in Tucson, Arizona. The 672nd Strategic Missile Squadron, which was renamed the 672nd Technical Training Squadron on 25 April 1958, was formed at Cooke Air Force Base on 1 January 1958, and moved to RAF Feltwell on 20 May 1958, and then to RAF Lakenheath on 17 August 1959, where it was disbanded on 1 October 1959.

RAF Bomber Command established a Strategic Missile School at RAF Feltwell in January 1961, and in May responsibility for Thor missile training passed from the USAF to the RAF. The school conducted courses for launch control officers, technical officers, authentication officers, missile serving chiefs and missile, general and electrical fitters. The final course—for launch control officers—graduated on 15 November 1962, and the school was closed.

To defend the stations from enemy aircraft, RAF squadrons were raised with the Bristol Bloodhound surface-to-air missile. The first of these was No. 264 Squadron RAF, which was formed at RAF North Coates on the Lincolnshire coast on 1 December 1958. Two more Bloodhound squadrons followed; No. 112 Squadron RAF, which was reformed at RAF Church Fenton on 1 August 1960, and No. 247 Squadron RAF which was formed at RAF Carnaby on 1 July 1960.

RAF Thor Missile Deployment
Station	County	Squadron	Reformed	Operational	Disbanded	Notes
Feltwell Station
RAF Feltwell	Norfolk	No. 77 Squadron RAF	1 September 1958	9 January 1959	10 July 1963	
RAF Shepherds Grove	Suffolk	No. 82 Squadron RAF	22 July 1959	22 July 1959	10 July 1963	
RAF Tuddenham	Suffolk	No. 107 Squadron RAF	22 July 1959	22 July 1959	10 July 1963	
RAF Mepal	Cambridgeshire	No. 113 Squadron RAF	22 July 1959	22 July 1959	10 July 1963	
RAF North Pickenham	Norfolk	No. 220 Squadron RAF	22 July 1959	22 July 1959	10 July 1963	
Hemswell Station
RAF Hemswell	Lincolnshire	No. 97 Squadron RAF	1 December 1958	12 January 1959	24 May 1963	
RAF Ludford Magna	Lincolnshire	No. 104 Squadron RAF	22 July 1959	22 July 1959	24 May 1963	
RAF Bardney	Lincolnshire	No. 106 Squadron RAF	22 July 1959	22 July 1959	24 May 1963	
RAF Coleby Grange	Lincolnshire	No. 142 Squadron RAF	22 July 1959	22 July 1959	24 May 1963	
RAF Caistor	Lincolnshire	No. 269 Squadron RAF	22 July 1959	22 July 1959	24 May 1963	
Driffield Station
RAF Driffield	Yorkshire	No. 98 Squadron RAF	1 August 1959	8 January 1959	18 April 1963	
RAF Full Sutton	Yorkshire	No. 102 Squadron RAF	1 August 1959	8 January 1959	27 April 1963	
RAF Carnaby	Yorkshire	No. 150 Squadron RAF	1 August 1959	8 January 1959	9 April 1963	
RAF Catfoss	Yorkshire	No. 226 Squadron RAF	1 August 1959	8 January 1959	9 March 1963	
RAF Breighton	Yorkshire	No. 240 Squadron RAF	1 August 1959	8 January 1959	8 January 1963	
North Luffenham Station
RAF North Luffenham	Rutland	No. 144 Squadron RAF	1 December 1959	12 January 1959	23 August 1963	
RAF Polebrook	Northamptonshire	No. 130 Squadron RAF	1 December 1959	12 January 1959	23 August 1963	
RAF Folkingham	Lincolnshire	No. 223 Squadron RAF	1 December 1959	12 January 1959	23 August 1963	
RAF Harrington	Northamptonshire	No. 218 Squadron RAF	1 December 1959	12 January 1959	23 August 1963	
RAF Melton Mowbray	Leicestershire	No. 254 Squadron RAF	1 December 1959	12 January 1959	23 August 1963	

== Missile launches by RAF personnel ==
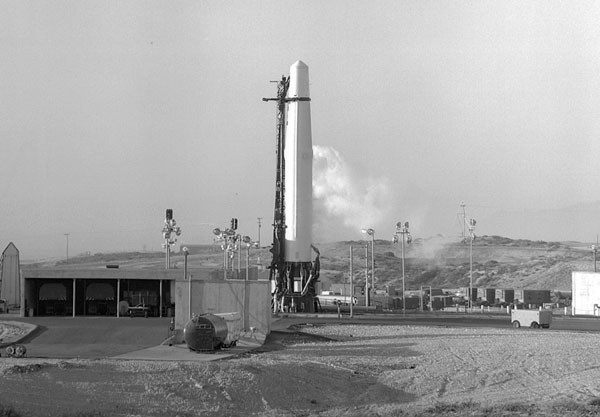
Launch of Thor T-220 from Complex 75-1-1 on 21 October 1959

The culmination of Thor missile training was to participate in a missile launch. Originally it was intended that all Thor missile crews would carry out at least one launch, but it soon became apparent that the cost would be prohibitive. Nonetheless, 21 RAF crews visited the United States for training, culminating in operational training launches from Vandenberg. This was known as Integrated Weapons System Training (IWST). During the testing and for the avoidance of doubt, the Americans were at pains to ensure standardisation of terminology between themselves and their UK colleagues.

The first of these launches was a launch codenamed Lions Roar. Despite the fact that a Thor missile had exploded on the launch pad just a few days before, the launch was viewed by dignitaries including Brigadier Godfrey Hobbs, the director of public relations at the Ministry of Defence; Air Vice-Marshal Walter Sheen, the RAF commander at the British Joint Staff Mission; and Air Vice-Marshal Augustus Walker, the commander of No. 1 Group. After delays due to weather and technical problems, the missile was successfully launched on 16 April 1959. In all, there were nine IWST launches, the last of which, codenamed Red Caboose, was on 21 January 1960.

In addition to the IWST launches, there were Combat Training Launches (CTLs). IWST launches were part of training, and launch crews were permitted technical holds in the countdown so they could be fully trained in launch procedures. A CTL was for an already trained crew, and was to demonstrate their proficiency. The first launch was viewed by the chief of the Defence Staff, Admiral of the Fleet Lord Mountbatten and Lady Mountbatten. The first three CTLs, like the IWST launches, used Douglas missiles taken off the assembly line; but there were concerns about the impact of the British weather on the missiles. Henceforth, a missile would be randomly chosen, and the missile and its crew flown to Vandenberg for testing. Twelve CTLs were carried out between 6 October 1959 and 18 June 1962; a planned CTL on 8 October 1962 was cancelled in the wake of the decision to withdraw the Thor missiles from service.

RAF Thor missile launches
Launch date	Launch pad	Code name	Code	Missile	Comments
1959
16 April	75-2-8	Lions Roar	IWST-1	T-161	Missile landed 93 nautical miles (172 km) from target.
16 April	75-2-7	Punch Press	IWST-2	T-191	Abandoned due to technical problems and conflict with the Discoverer 3 launch.
16 June	75-2-7	Rifle Shot	IWST-2	T-191	Destroyed by Range Safety Officer.
3 August	75-1-1	Bean Ball	IWST-3	T-175	Missile landed 63 nautical miles (117 km) from target.
14 August	75-2-6	Short Skip	IWST-4	T-190	Failed
17 September	75-1-2	Grease Gun	IWST-5	T-228	Landed off target
6 October	75-2-8	Foreign Travel	CTL-1	T-239	Success
21 October	75-1-1	Stand Fast	IWST-6	T-220	Success
12 November	75-1-2	Beach Buggy	IWST-7	T-181	Success
1 December	75-1-1	Hard Right	CTL-2	T-265	Success
14 December	75-1-2	Tall Girl	IWST-8	T-185	Missile broke up
1960
21 January	75-1-2	Red Caboose	IWST-9	T-215	Success
2 March	75-2-8	Center Board	CTL-3	T-272	Success
22 June	75-2-7	Clan Chattan	CTL-4	T-223	Success. First missile returned from the UK for launch
11 October	75-2-8	Left Rudder	CTL-5	T-186	Success
13 December	75-2-8	Acton Town	CTL-6	T-267	Success
1961
29 March	75-2-7	Shepherds Bush	CTL-7	T-243	Success
20 June	75-2-7	White Bishop	CTL-8	T-276	Success
6 September	LE-7 (Note: Pads 75-2-6, 75-2-7 and 75-2-8 were renamed LE-6, LE-7 and LE-8 respectively in September 1961.)	Skye Boat	CTL-9	T-165	Success
5 December	LE-8	Pipers Delight	CTL-10	T-214	Success
1962
19 March	LE-7	Black Knife	CTL-11	T-229	Destroyed by Range Safety Officer
18 June	LE-8	Blazing Ciders	CTL-12	T-269	Success

== Cuban Missile Crisis ==
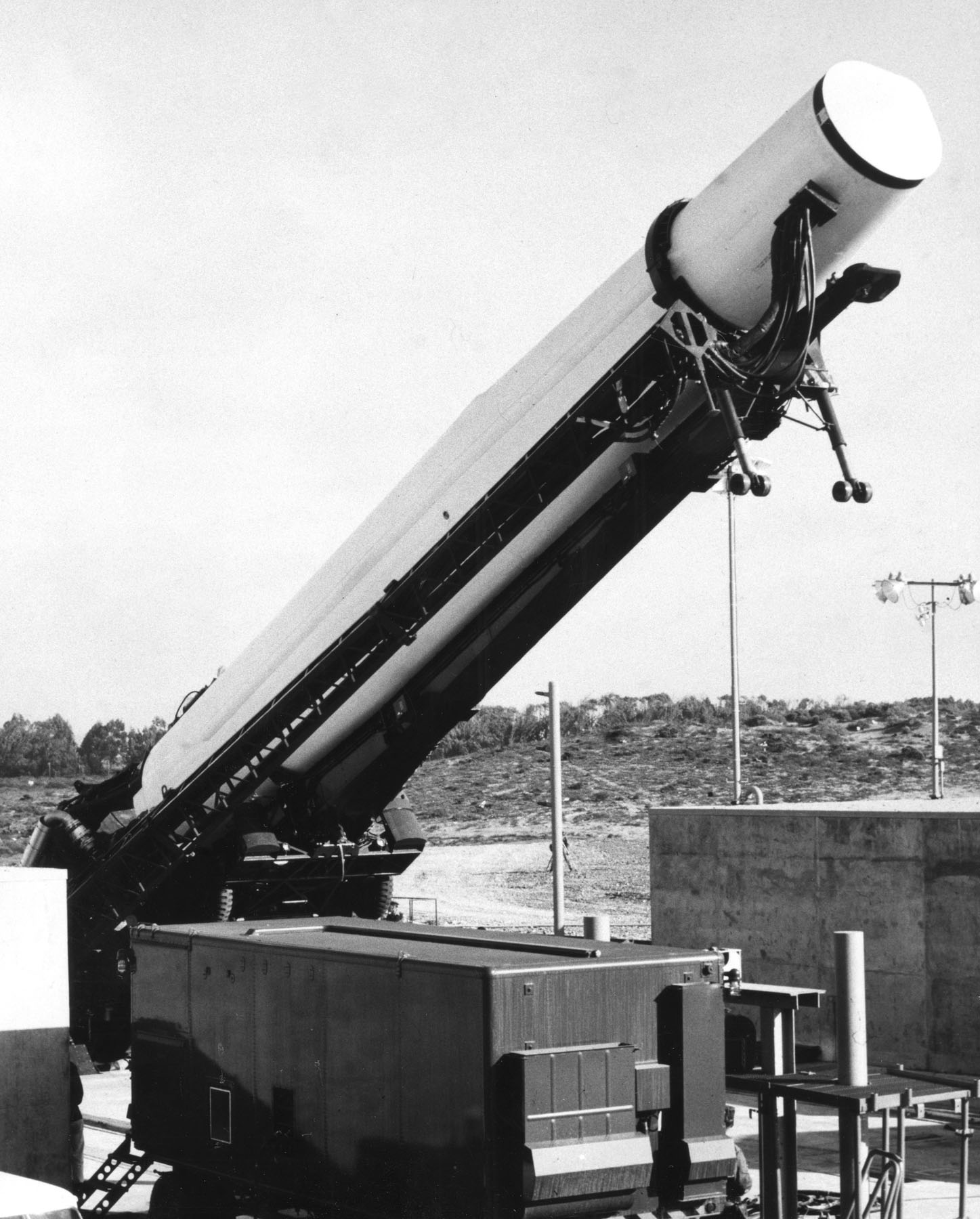
Thor missile being prepared for launch

The deployment of Jupiter IRBMs to Italy and Turkey in 1961 led to the Soviet Union responding by attempting to deploy IRBMs in Cuba. Their discovery by the United States led to the Cuban Missile Crisis. SAC was placed on DEFCON 3 on 22 October 1962, and DEFCON 2 on 24 October. RAF Bomber Command moved to Alert Condition 3, equivalent to DEFCON 3, on 27 October. Normally between 45 and 50 Thor missiles were ready to fire in 15 minutes. Without altering the alert condition, the number of missiles ready to fire in 15 minutes was increased to 59, the only exception being a missile used for training at RAF Feltwell. The dual key system was thereby put under strain due to the RAF and USAF personnel being on different states of readiness.

Under the war plan that had gone into effect on 1 August 1962, the RAF's bombers and Thor missiles targeted 16 cities, 44 airfields, 10 air defence control centres and 20 IRBM sites. The crisis passed, and SAC reverted to DEFCON 3 on 21 November and DEFCON 4 on 24 November. In the aftermath of the crisis, RAF Bomber Command ordered that in future 39 missiles would be on 15-minute readiness, with the Feltwell station maintaining nine on alert and the other three stations keeping ten.

== Termination ==
The RAF high command never warmed to missiles, and always ranked them secondary to the V-bomber force. The missile bases were separate from the rest of the RAF and its personnel considered outside the mainstream. Project Emily gave the RAF considerable experience in missile operations, but the cancellation of Blue Streak on 2 February 1960 in favour of Skybolt, an air-launched ballistic missile, rendered this expertise of dubious value. Given the amount of time and money spent on Thor, consideration was given to extending the deployment. Responding to the arguments made for and against Blue Streak, there were proposals for improving Thor. If the missiles were already fuelled, then they could be launched in as little as 60 seconds, but they could only remain fuelled for two hours, after which components froze from contact with the liquid oxygen. The missiles then needed six hours to thaw out. It was impractical to base them underground, but being above ground made them very vulnerable to a nuclear attack. Yet the twenty Thor missiles squadrons were equivalent to seven and a half squadrons of V-bombers. Without them, there would be just fourteen V-bombers on quick alert.

Under the original agreement, the USAF paid the cost of maintenance for the missiles for five years. After this costs would fall on the United Kingdom, which would have to take over their logistic support. With ICBMs becoming available, the Americans did not foresee the Thor missiles making a substantial contribution to the western nuclear deterrent after 1965. On 1 May 1962, the United States Secretary of Defense, Robert McNamara, informed the minister of defence, Harold Watkinson, that the United States would not provide support for Thor after 31 October 1964. Watkinson then informed him that the system would be phased out. An Air Council meeting on 31 May 1962 decided that Project Emily should be terminated by the end of 1963. A public announcement was made on 1 August 1962. McNamara's decision on 7 November 1962 to cancel Skybolt—approved by President John F. Kennedy on 23 November—left the RAF without a successor to Thor. The British government then negotiated the Nassau Agreement to buy Polaris. The future of the British strategic nuclear deterrent now lay with the Royal Navy, and the last Thor squadrons were inactivated on 23 August 1963.

== Preservation ==
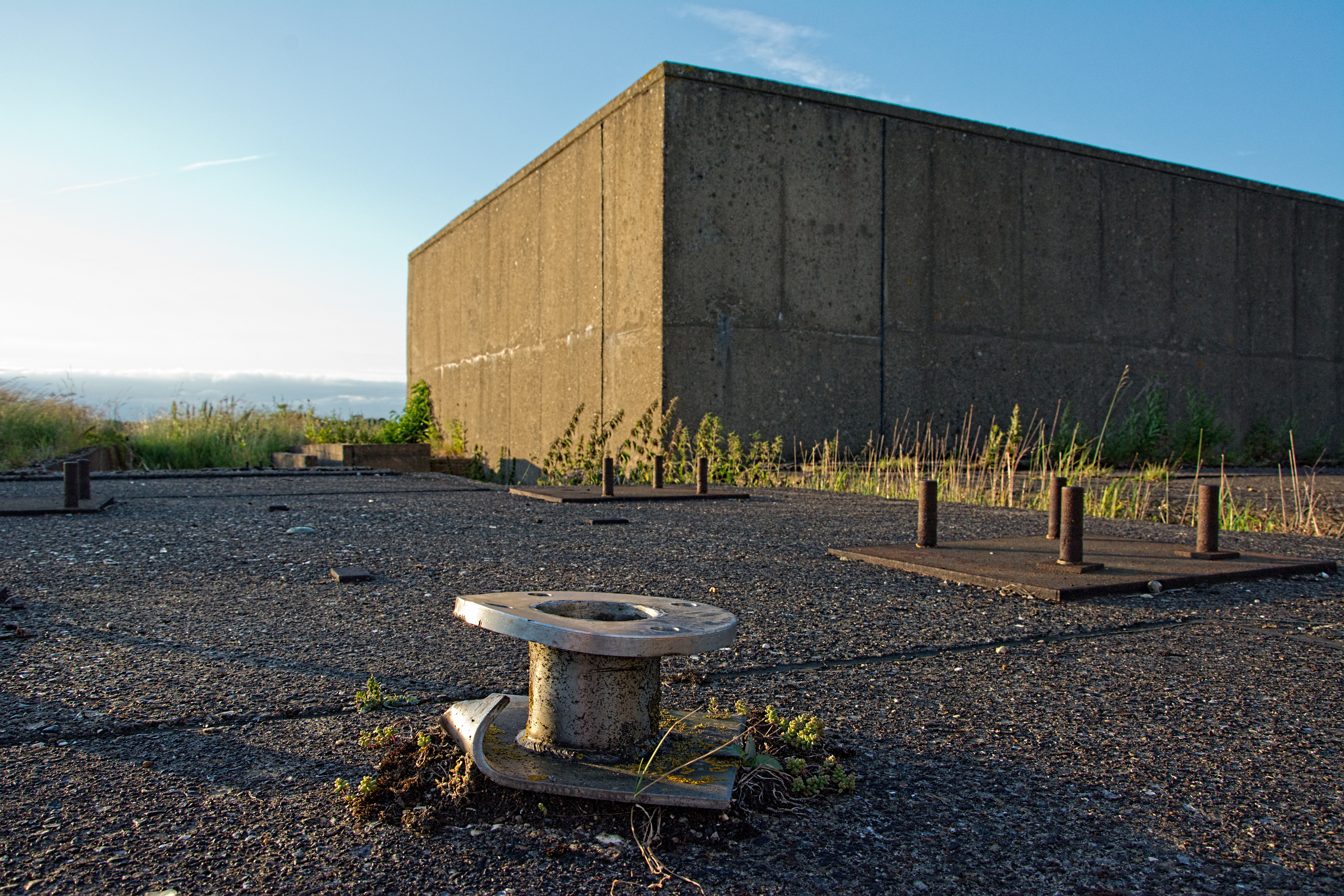
Thor missile site at RAF Harrington

The Thor missiles were flown back to the United States, and refurbished at the Douglas Aircraft plant in Tulsa, Oklahoma. The engines were removed and refurbished by Rocketdyne. Although no Thor missiles were launched by the RAF with nuclear warheads, seven were launched with live nuclear warheads as part of Operation Fishbowl in 1962, two of which were former RAF missiles. Of the seven attempts, only three were successful. Another 55 former RAF Thor missiles were expended in military space shots between 18 September 1963 and 15 July 1980. As of 2017, three ex-RAF Thor missiles remained. One was in the Royal Air Force Museum Cosford, one in the National Museum of the United States Air Force, and one at Vandenberg Air Force Base.

In October 2012 the former launch sites at RAF Harrington and RAF North Luffenham were granted listed status.
