= Richard Gammon =

British World War I flying ace

Richard John Gammon
- Born: 5 January 1898; Hounslow, Middlesex, England
- Died: 4 February 1956 (aged 58); Middlesex, England
- Military career
- Allegiance: United Kingdom
- Branch: British Army; Royal Air Force
- Service years: c.1914–1919 1940–c.1945
- Rank: Captain
- Unit: No. 104 Squadron RAF
- Awards: Distinguished Flying Cross

Captain Richard John Gammon DFC (5 January 1898 – 4 February 1956) was an English World War I flying ace credited with five aerial victories.

== World War I ==
He enlisted into the army at Hampton Court in 1914 or 1915 and served on the Western Front until invalided out after suffering from trench foot. He volunteered to transfer to the Royal Flying Corps as a cadet, and was commissioned as a probationary temporary second lieutenant on 29 August 1917, being confirmed in his rank and appointed a flying officer on 8 February 1918.

Gammon was assigned to No. 104 Squadron, part of the Independent Air Force, flying the Airco DH.9 light bomber, with Second Lieutenant Percival Appleby as his observer/gunner. He was appointed a temporary captain on 27 June 1918.

Gammon and Appleby gained their first victory on 1 July 1918 destroying an Albatros D.V over Metz. A month later, on 1 August, they accounted for a Pfalz D.III at Boulay airfield. On 7 September Gammon was the commander of ten aircraft (two flights) from No. 104 Squadron which, with eleven aircraft from No. 99 Squadron, mounted a daylight air raid on the Badische Anilin- und Soda-Fabrik chemical works at Mannheim. The British force, under the overall command of Major Lawrence Pattinson of No. 99 Squadron, were attacked by numbers of enemy aircraft on the outward flight, while over the target, and on their return. However, they successfully dropped over two tons of bombs on the target, and also shot down six enemy aircraft, two of which were credited to Gammon and Appleby. As a result of this raid, Gammon and Appleby were awarded the Distinguished Flying Cross. Their citation read:

Lieutenant (Temporary Captain) Richard John Gammon.
Second Lieutenant Percival Ewart Appleby.

Captain Gammon, with 2nd Lt. Appleby as Observer, was the leader of two formations (ten machines in all) on a recent raid. En route the formation was attacked by fifteen hostile aircraft: having driven these off, they reached the objective, which was successfully bombed. While thus engaged the formation was fiercely attacked by fifteen enemy machines, which continued the attack for some distance on the return journey, until they were driven off. Upon nearing our lines the formation was again assailed by seven machines; in the engagement that ensued one of these was destroyed and two driven down by Captain Gammon and his Observer, and, in addition, three others were destroyed by our other machines. The officer who led the whole of the combined formations of this raid speaks in the highest terms of Captain Gammon's leadership and skilful co-operation. 2nd Lt. Appleby was of the greatest assistance to Captain Gammon throughout, keeping him informed of the movements and manoeuvres of the hostile machines. This officer has taken part in numerous raids, displaying on all occasions great keenness and determination.

Their fifth and final victory came two weeks later, on 15 September, destroying another Pfalz D.III over Verny. Gammon finally left the Royal Air Force after the end of the war, being transferred to the unemployed list on 9 September 1919.

== World War II ==
Gammon returned to service in the Royal Air Force Volunteer Reserve during World War II, being commissioned as a pilot officer "for the duration of hostilities", on 8 January 1940. He was promoted to the war substantive rank of flying officer, and then to flight lieutenant, in early 1941, and to squadron leader on 20 April 1943.

Gammon remained in the RAF Reserve after the war, until finally relinquishing his commission on 10 August 1954, being permitted to retain the rank of wing commander.

== Personal life ==
Gammon, then living in Uxbridge, married Kitty Isabella Mary Gough in 1921. She died in Worthing in 1986.
