= Ford, Chivelstone =

Hamlet in Devon, England

Coordinates: 50.252330°N 3.7014136°W

Ford
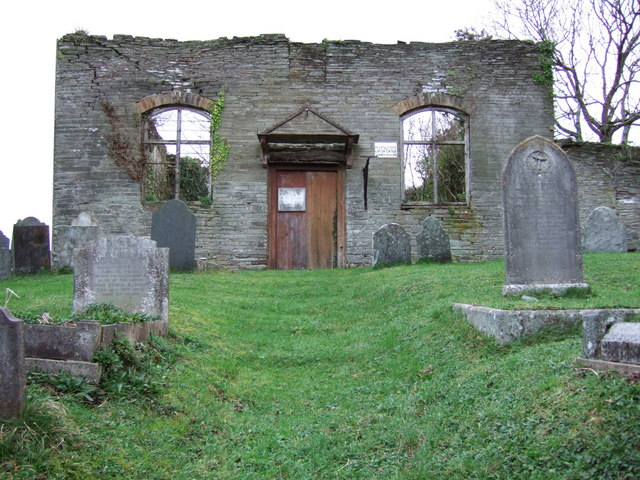

- Location within Devon
- Civil parish: Chivelstone
- District: South Hams
- Shire county: Devon
- Region: South West
- Country: England
- Sovereign state: United Kingdom
- Police: Devon and Cornwall
- Fire: Devon and Somerset
- Ambulance: South Western

Ford is a hamlet about 6 miles from Stoke Fleming, in the civil parish of Chivelstone, in the South Hams district, in the county of Devon, England. Ford contains around a dozen houses and has a ruined chapel. In 1870-72 it had a population of 64.

== History ==
Ford was recorded in the Domesday Book as Forde/Forda. Ford was also known as "Ford juxta Alington".
