= RAF Melton Mowbray =

Former RAF base in Leicestershire, England

RAF Melton Mowbray
- Melton Mowbray, Leicestershire in England
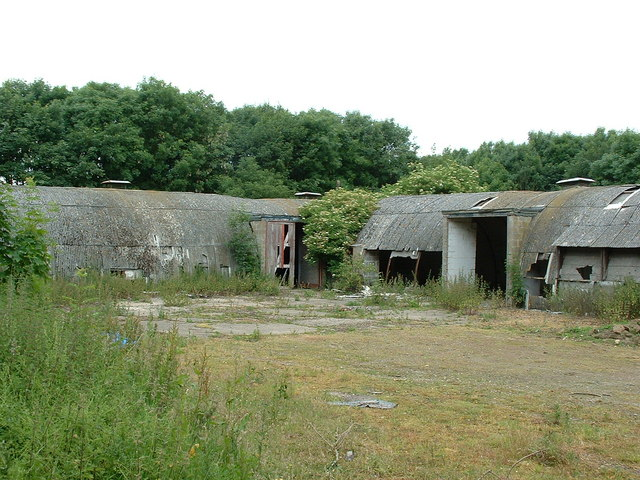
- RAF Buildings on the old technical site.

Site information
- Type: Royal Air Force station
- Owner: Ministry of Defence
- Operator: Royal Air Force
- Controlled by: RAF Transport Command

Location
- Shown within Leicestershire RAF Melton Mowbray (the United Kingdom)
- Coordinates: 52°44′01″N 000°53′47″W

Site history
- Built: 1941
- In use: 1942 - 1964
- Battles/wars: European theatre of World War II

Airfield information
- Elevation: 114 metres (374 ft) AMSL
Runways
Direction	Length and surface
00/00	Asphalt
00/00	Asphalt
00/00	Asphalt

Royal Air Force Melton Mowbray or more simply RAF Melton Mowbray is a former Royal Air Force station located 2.3 miles (3.7 km) south of the centre of Melton Mowbray, Leicestershire and 13.6 miles (21.9 km) south east of Loughborough, Leicestershire, England.

== History ==
The Class A airfield was originally intended for aircraft maintenance but was taken over by RAF Transport Command. Many types of aircraft were flown from the airfield, including Supermarine Spitfire, de Havilland Mosquito, Vought Corsair, Vultee Vengeance, Grumman Hellcat, Douglas Dakota and Handley Page Halifax aircraft, plus Airspeed Horsa and Waco Hadrian gliders.

=== Units ===
- No. 4 Aircraft Preparation Unit between 5 July 1944 and 9 October 1944.
- Mk X AI Conversion Flt between 29 August 1944 and 8 September 1944.
- No. 306 Ferry Training Unit between 13 October 1943 and 15 January 1944.
- No. 307 Ferry Training Unit between 14 October 1943 and 15 January 1944.
- No. 304 Ferry Training Unit between 3 January 1944 and 9 October 1944.
- No. 1 Ferry Pilot Pool between 14 January 1944 and 16 March 1944.
- No. 1341 Special Duties Flt during 1944.
- 'J' Flt between 28 September 1945 and 5 October 1945.
- No. 12 Ferry Unit between 9 October 1944 and 7 November 1945.

=== Post war ===
Between 1946 and 1958 the site was used as a Polish Resettlement Corps camp housing Polish Air Force personnel and their relations.

Melton Mowbray served as a Thor Strategic missile site between 1959 and 1963, when 254(SM) Squadron operated a flight of three missiles from the base.

== Current use ==
The airfield now houses a small industrial estate including padstore self storage, terminal 1, lounds pallets and JCR commercial Ltd. Little of the original infrastructure has Survived (2 Runways, 3 Access Road and A Small Brick House)

== See also ==
- List of former Royal Air Force stations
