= Hugh Edwards (author) =

Hugh Edwards (1878–1952) was an author of several books who, despite not achieving wider recognition, gained significant critical praise for his short novel All Night at Mr Stanyhurst’s, first published in 1933. Critic James Agate described the book as "the best long story or short novel since Conrad".

Edwards was from a naval family, born in Gibraltar and educated privately at Sandhurst. For twelve years he served in the West India Regiment, based mostly in the West Indies and West Africa. He was in Barbados during the eruption of Mount Pelée in 1902, and survived burial under the ruins of the barracks in the Kingston earthquake of 1907.

Invalided out of the regiment he moved to East Prawle in Devon, where he lived a secluded life in a fisherman's cottage owned by his sister. After twenty years his first novel, Sangoree (1932) was accepted by the publisher Jonathan Cape. It is set in the West Indies during the early 19th century. Then came All Night at Mr Stanyhurst’s (1933, the story of an eighteenth century shipwreck), Crack of Doom (1934, featuring volcanic eruptions and earthquakes), Helen Between Cupids (1935) and Macaroni (1938), the latter published by Geoffrey Bles.

James Agate described All Night at Mr Stanyhurst’s as "a little masterpiece". But despite several strong reviews the book did not sell. According to Ian Fleming "it took more than four years for the modest edition of fifteen hundred to be sold. The author earned £31.3s and the publisher barely covered his costs, having rashly spent £50 on advertising". The book was reset and republished by Jonathan Cape in 1937 as part of its New Library series, retaining the original illustrations by Eric Fraser. That run of three thousand took a further seven years to sell. There was also a Services paperback edition published by Guild Books in 1943.

Commander E.J. King-Bull, a writer and BBC producer, was an admirer of the novel and produced it as a radio play for the Third Programme. It was first broadcast on 8 March 1954, with three repeats that year. The book's more widespread re-discovery came in 1963, when Ian Fleming persuaded his publisher Jonathan Cape to reissue it. Cape agreed to do so only if Fleming would write an introduction to help sales. This edition, including the introduction, was issued as a Pan paperback in 1965.

Edwards published no more after 1938, and little else is known about his life. He died in 1952 at the age of 73.
