= William Bottrill =

William Eric Bottrill
- Born: 26 September 1892; Burton on Trent, England
- Died: 6 October 1971 (aged 79); Dundas, Ontario, Canada
- Military career
- Allegiance: Canada; United Kingdom
- Branch: Canadian Expeditionary Force; Royal Air Force
- Rank: Second Lieutenant
- Units: 91st Regiment Canadian Highlanders; 36th Battalion, CEF; 1st Central Ontario Regiment; No. 104 Squadron RAF
- Conflicts: World War I
- Awards: Distinguished Flying Cross

Second Lieutenant William Eric Bottrill DFC was a Canadian World War I flying ace credited with five aerial victories.

Bottrill was born in Burton on Trent, England, but was living in Hamilton, Ontario, working as a stockhelper (shipping clerk) on the outbreak of the First World War. He served in the 91st Regiment Canadian Highlanders, part of Canada's Non-Permanent Active Militia, until he enlisted into the Canadian Expeditionary Force on 20 April 1915, and was posted to the 36th Battalion. When the battalion embarked aboard the SS Corsican at Montreal on 19 June 1915 to sail for Europe, he held the rank of sergeant.

On 12 March 1918 Bottrill, now a member of the 1st Central Ontario Regiment, was seconded for duty with the Royal Air Force, with the rank of temporary lieutenant. He served as an observer/gunner in No. 104 Squadron RAF flying the Airco DH.9, where between August and October 1918, with pilots Lieutenant D. P. Pogson and Captain E. J. Garland, he shot down five enemy aircraft. On 12 January 1919 his secondment to the RAF ended, and on 10 October 1919 he was awarded the Distinguished Flying Cross.
