= RNAS Prawle Point =

RNAS/RAF Prawle Point
- IATA: none; ICAO: none

Summary
- Airport type: Military
- Operator: Royal Naval Air Service; Royal Air Force
- Location: East Prawle
- Built: 1917
- In use: 1917-1919
- Coordinates: 50°13′09″N 003°42′57″W

Map
- Location in Devon

Runways
Direction	Length		Surface
Direction	ft	m	Surface
00/00	0	0	Grass
00/00	0	0	Grass

The RNAS Naval Air Station Prawle Point was a British First World War airfield outside the village of East Prawle in Devon, England and 2.6 miles (4.2 km) south east of Salcombe, Devon.

The airfield was opened in 1917 to provide a base for de Havilland DH.6 and de Havilland DH.9s of the Royal Naval Air Service to carry out anti-submarine patrols.

== History ==
With the formation of the Royal Air Force in April 1918 the airfield became RAF Prawle Point and aircraft flights became 254 Squadron. The squadron was divided into flights with 492 (Light Bomber) Flight operating the DH.9s and 515 and 516 (Special Duties) Flights the DH.6s. The squadron disbanded on 22 February 1919 and flying at Prawle Point ended.

== Current use ==
The airfield is now used for farming.
