= Jeffrey Batters Home-Hay =

Scottish-born Canadian flying ace

Jeffery Batters Home-Hay
- Born: 2 February 1887; Alloa, Scotland
- Died: 14 June 1953 (aged 66); Kelvington, Saskatchewan, Canada
- Military career
- Allegiance: Canada; United Kingdom
- Branch: Canadian Expeditionary Force; Royal Flying Corps
- Service years: 1914–1919
- Rank: Captain
- Units: 32nd Battalion, CEF; Argyll and Sutherland Highlanders; No. 14 (Reserve) Squadron RFC; No. 6 (Reserve) Squadron RFC; No. 53 Squadron RFC; No. 105 Squadron RFC; No. 104 Squadron RAF
- Commands: No. 106 Squadron RAF
- Awards: Military Cross; Distinguished Flying Cross; Mentioned in Despatches
- Other work: Pioneering aviator in central Canada

Captain Jeffery Batters Home-Hay MC, DFC (2 February 1887 – 14 June 1953) was a Scottish-born Canadian who became a flying ace during World War I. He was a bomber pilot when he was credited with seven aerial victories. He was shot down and captured toward the end of World War I. After being repatriated, he became a pioneering Canadian bush pilot. By the end of his aviation career, he was the oldest pilot still flying in Canada.

== Personal life ==
Jeffrey Batters Home-Hay was born in Alloa, Scotland on 2 February 1887. He was schooled in Scotland until 1904; he then apprenticed as an engineer. He also apparently served in the military, probably in the Argyll and Sutherland Highlanders Regiment, as he was commissioned into it later. He was orphaned in his youth, and emigrated with his widowed mother and his five siblings from Scotland to Canada prior to World War I, in 1908. He farmed at Wadena, Saskatchewan.

He enlisted into the 32nd Battalion, CEF at Winnipeg, Saskatchewan on 29 December 1914 as a private, with the regimental number 81404. On his enlistment attestation paper, he gave his residence as Kamsack, his occupation as steam fitter, and claimed prior military experience. His next of kin listing of his mother, Margaret Batters Home-Hay as residing in Alloa, indicates she had re-emigrated. The enlistee's physical stated he was 5 feet 8 1/2 inches (1.74 m) tall.

== World War I service ==
Although Home-Hay was originally assigned to the Machine Gun Section of the 32nd Battalion, he served in France with the 2nd Battalion from April to December 1915. Towards the end of this duty, he was appointed a second lieutenant in the Argyll and Sutherland Highlanders effective 23 November 1915, with pay and allowances to begin 6 January 1916.

He transferred to the Royal Flying Corps, reporting on 16 May 1916 to Reading, England for aviation training. He was posted to No. 14 (Reserve) Squadron RFC on 19 June 1916, then to No. 6 (Reserve) Squadron RFC. On 10 July 1916, he was awarded Royal Aero Club Aviators Certificate number 3209. He underwent advanced training at Catterick Aerodrome. On 30 July 1916, he was appointed as a flying officer in the Royal Flying Corps and seconded for aviation duty. When he was posted to No. 53 Squadron RFC in August 1916, it was still in England. He moved with it to France in early 1917 to fly artillery cooperation duty, for which he won a Military Cross. The accompanying award citation read:

"He showed consistent ability and courage in observing for and ranging our artillery upon enemy guns, and trenches. His accurate Information was of the greatest value to our batteries."

He was appointed a flight commander in the Royal Flying Corps on 7 June 1917, with an accompanying promotion to the rank of temporary captain. On 1 July 1917, he was promoted to the rank of lieutenant in his home regiment, the Argylls, but remained seconded to the RFC. He served with the RFC until returned to Home Establishment in England on 15 December 1917.

Home-Hay was assigned to No. 105 Squadron RFC on 4 January 1918. On 19 May 1918, he joined the Independent Air Force's No. 104 Squadron RAF at Azelot, France. He flew strategic bombing raids into Germany, scoring seven aerial victories during these raids. He and his observer were brought down on 22 August 1918 and taken prisoner.

Home-Hay won a Distinguished Flying Cross, which was gazetted on 21 September 1918. His award citation noted:

"This officer displayed admirable coolness and resource while leading a raid on an enemy railway station. His formation was heavily attacked by seven aeroplanes, but keeping it well in hand, he fought his way to his objective; proceeding well over the station, he successfully bombed it. In the course of the severe fighting two hostile machines were shot down out of control, one of which he himself brought down. He has taken part in eight other raids, and his consistent gallantry is a valuable asset in maintaining the morale of his new squadron."

Unmentioned in this citation is an instance of gallantry that had been noted in the letter of recommendation for the award:

"While the encounter with enemy aeroplanes was in progress at 14,000 feet over the objective, Captain J. B. Home-Hay saw a machine of another squadron which had lost its formation and was at a low altitude firing Very lights for assistance as it was being attacked. Captain Home-Hay brought his formation down to 9,000 feet and picked this machine up in his formation, and escorted it to the lines."

Home-Hay's pilot's log was lost during his confinement by the Germans, but he later estimated that by war's end he had over 1,500 hours flight time in two-seater aircraft. Types flown included not just DH.9s, but Maurice Farmans, Avros, Royal Aircraft Factory RE.8s, and Airco DH.4s; he had also logged some time on Bristol Scout and Sopwith Snipe fighters.

== List of aerial victories ==
No.	Date/time	Aircraft	Foe	Result	Location	Notes
1	30 June 1918 @ 0740 hours	Airco DH.9	Albatros D.V	Destroyed	Vicinity of Landau, Germany	Observer: Charles Cecil Blizard
2	6 July 1918 @ 0845 hours	Airco DH.9 serial number C2960	German airplane	Driven down out of control	Metz, France	Observer: Charles Cecil Blizard
3	11 August 1918 @ 0910 hours	Airco DH.9	German fighter	Driven down out of control	Karlsruhe, Germany	Observer: William Thomas Smith
4	12 August 1918 @ 0715 hours	Airco DH.9	Fokker D.VII	Destroyed	Saverne	Observer: Charles Cecil Blizard
5	13 August 1918 @ 1545 hours	Airco DH.9	Pfalz D.III	Destroyed	Corny	Observer: William Thomas Smith
6	13 August 1918 @ 1545 hours	Airco DH.9	Pfalz D.III	Destroyed	South of Corny	Observer: William Thomas Smith
7	15 August 1918 @ 1830 hours	Airco DH.9	Pfalz D.III	Driven down out of control	Château-Salins, France	Observer: William Thomas Smith

== Post World War I ==
Home-Hay was repatriated from being a POW in mid December 1918.

He was belatedly Mentioned in Despatches on 1 January 1919 because after No. 99 Squadron RAF lost seven out of nine planes on 31 July 1918 while bombing Saarbrücken, Germany, Home-Hay helped lead a successful follow-up attack. On 22 August, on the sortie on which he was shot down, Home-Hay also helped lead an attack on Mannheim, Germany despite being attacked by ten German fighters.

After his return from captivity, he was assigned to schools, then to temporary command of No. 106 Squadron RAF, until he was shipped home to Canada from RAF Upavon on 10 June 1919. On 18 July 1919, he went on the unemployed list of the Royal Air Force.

On 7 April 1920, he asked to join the nascent Canadian Air Force. Meanwhile, he was farming in Canada when asked to take part in the first Canadian transcontinental flight from Halifax, Nova Scotia to Vancouver in late August 1920. Despite official miscommunications via mail, and a break from flight preparations necessitated by a brother's severe illness at harvest time, Home-Hay helped prepare planes for the flight and took part in the historic journey, returning to his farm on 23 October 1920. The next year, he took a refresher course from 20 June through 27 July to qualify for a commercial license.

On 30 September 1921, Home-Hay gave up his commission. He became a commercial pilot throughout the late 1920s and early 1930s for a number of early Canadian airlines–Prairie Airways, Commercial Airways, United Air Service, National Airways, Brooks Airways–all with the commonality of being based in Manitoba or Saskatchewan.

He returned to military service with the Royal Canadian Air Force; from 4 January through 19 March 1932 he took a navigational course as a Flight Lieutenant. On 4 May 1933, he became a reserve officer at that rank.

On 23 January 1934, he began flying for Arrow Airways. At the beginning of World War II, on 15 September 1939, he applied to join the RCAF as a Norseman pilot, as he owned Norseman tail number CF-BFU. However, his actual World War II service is unknown.

Jeffrey Batters Home-Hay eventually became the oldest active pilot in Canada. He finally retired to his farm at Kelvington in 1952, where he died in Summer 1956.
