= Prawle Point =

Headland in south Devon, England

- Headland
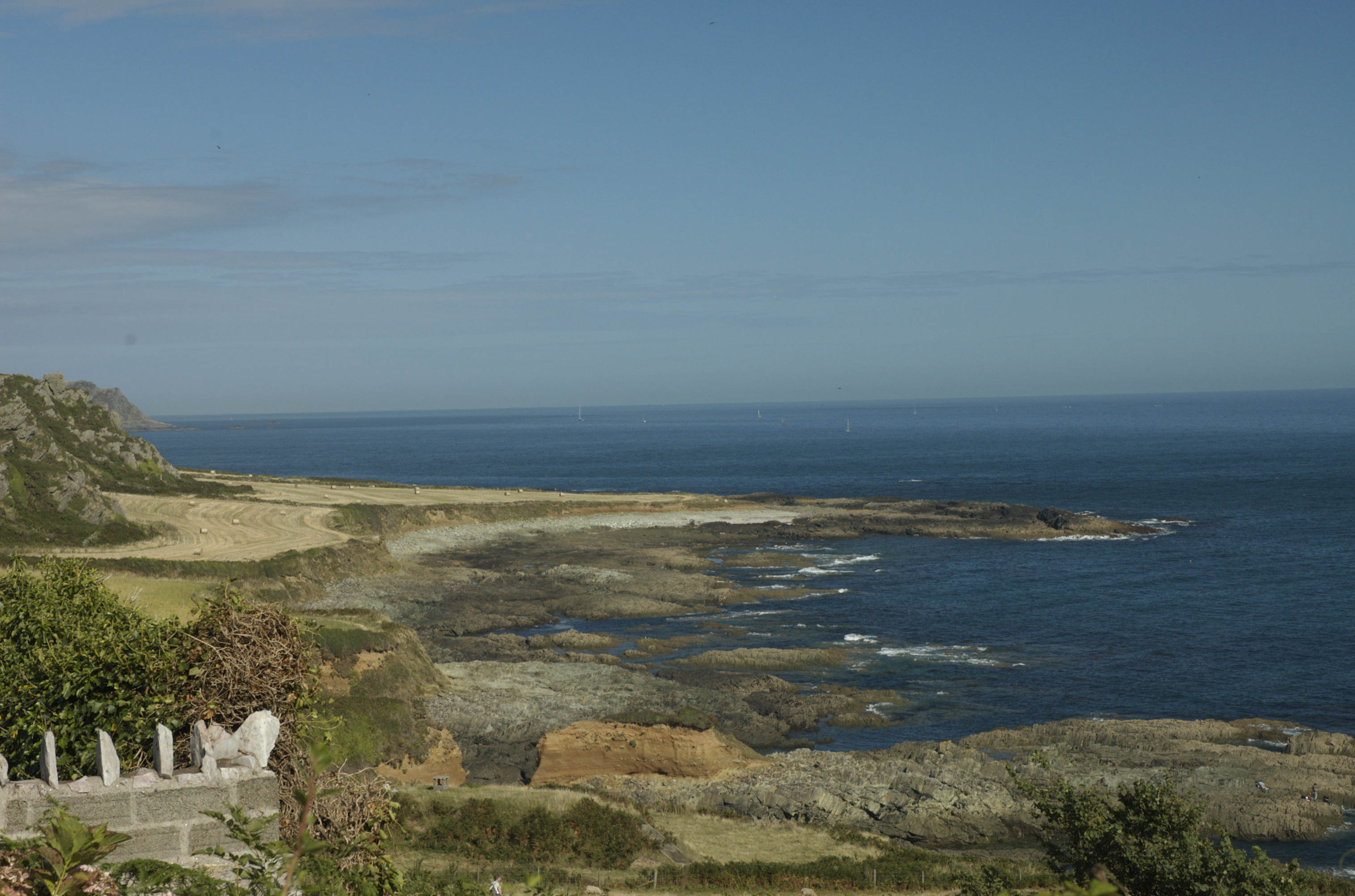
- The eastwards view from Prawle Point

- Location within Devon
- Coordinates: 50°12′6″N 3°43′19″W

Prawle Point (Old English: Prǣwhyll, "lookout hill") is a coastal headland in south Devon, England. It is the southernmost point of Devon. Just to the west is Elender Cove, and further west are Gammons Head Beach, also known as Maceley Cove, and Gammon Head.

Access is from the village of East Prawle along a single-track road, at the end of which a National Trust car park is present. At the point itself, there are high cliffs. The National Coastwatch Institution has a station at the point.

The area around the point is a noted area for cirl bunting, a localised bird in Britain, while the area has also attracted many rare vagrant birds including Britain's second chestnut-sided warbler.

The point is included within the Prawle Point and Start Point Site of Special Scientific Interest, which stretches from here to Start Point.

== Shipwrecks ==
Many ships have been wrecked at Prawle Point.

Lalla Rookh, a tea clipper, was wrecked after striking Gammon head, afterwards being broken up and blown into Elender Cove, where she lies underneath the sand today.

In December 1992 the ship Demetrios, formerly the Long Lin from China, was being towed by a tug from Dunkirk to a Mediterranean scrapyard. During terrible gales in the English Channel, the tow broke and the Demetrios drifted helplessly. The ship struck the rocks at Prawle Point on 18 December, breaking her back in a few hours. The wreck attracted huge crowds for many weeks, and eventually a local salvage company cut up the ship and towed away the remains to Plymouth. However, the cost of scrapping the ship sent them into liquidation. Some remains were, however left over and are still visible today.
