= Prawle Point and Start Point Site of Special Scientific Interest =

Biological and geological Site of Special Scientific Interest in south Devon, England

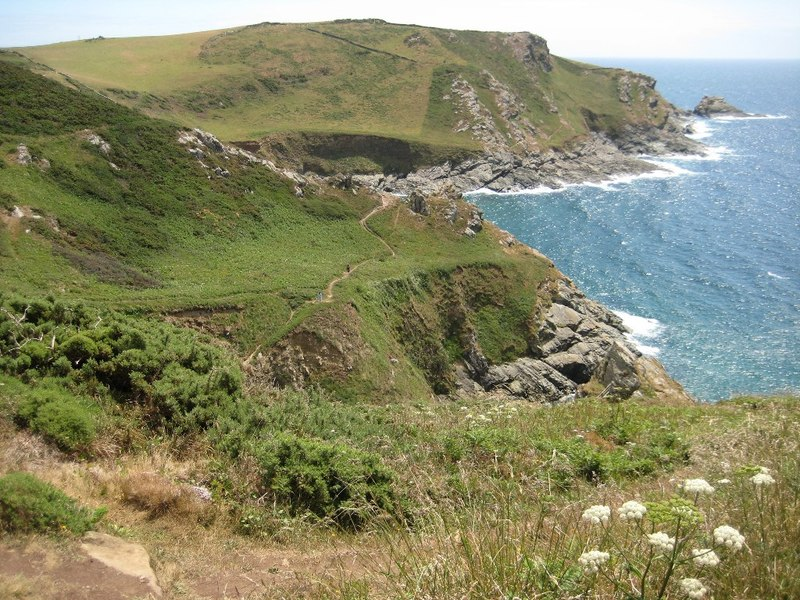
The view towards Prawle Point

The Prawle Point and Start Point Site of Special Scientific Interest (grid reference SX741371 to grid reference SX819381) is a 341.2 hectare biological and geological Site of Special Scientific Interest in southern Devon, notified in 1976.

It includes the coastal headlands of Prawle Point and Start Point.

The soft cliffs between Prawle Point and Start Point are recognised as being one of the most important sites for solitary bees and wasps in the UK. Over 100 species have been recorded including many rare and scarce species.

This section of coast features an almost continuous 5 km stretch of soft head deposits on a raised hard rock platform. These cliffs are south facing and feature sheltered coves, offering ideal conditions for thermophilic (warmth-loving) invertebrates. The friable cliff material and high temperatures attract large nesting aggregations of solitary bees and wasps which burrow into the cliff.

Prawle cliffs are the only site in the UK for the rare cuckoo bee Nomada sexfasciata, a cleptoparasite of the long-horned mining bee Eucera longicornis. Another rare species of particular note is the mason wasp Euodynerus quadrifasciatus. Currently, this is only known from three sites in the UK: East Prawle, West Weare (Portland, Dorset), and Thursley Common (Surrey).

Prawle is also an important site for the Cirl bunting, and supports a rich lichen assemblage.

== Sources ==
- English Nature citation sheet for the site (accessed 3 November 2006)
