= Start Point Lighthouse =

Lighthouse in south Devon, England

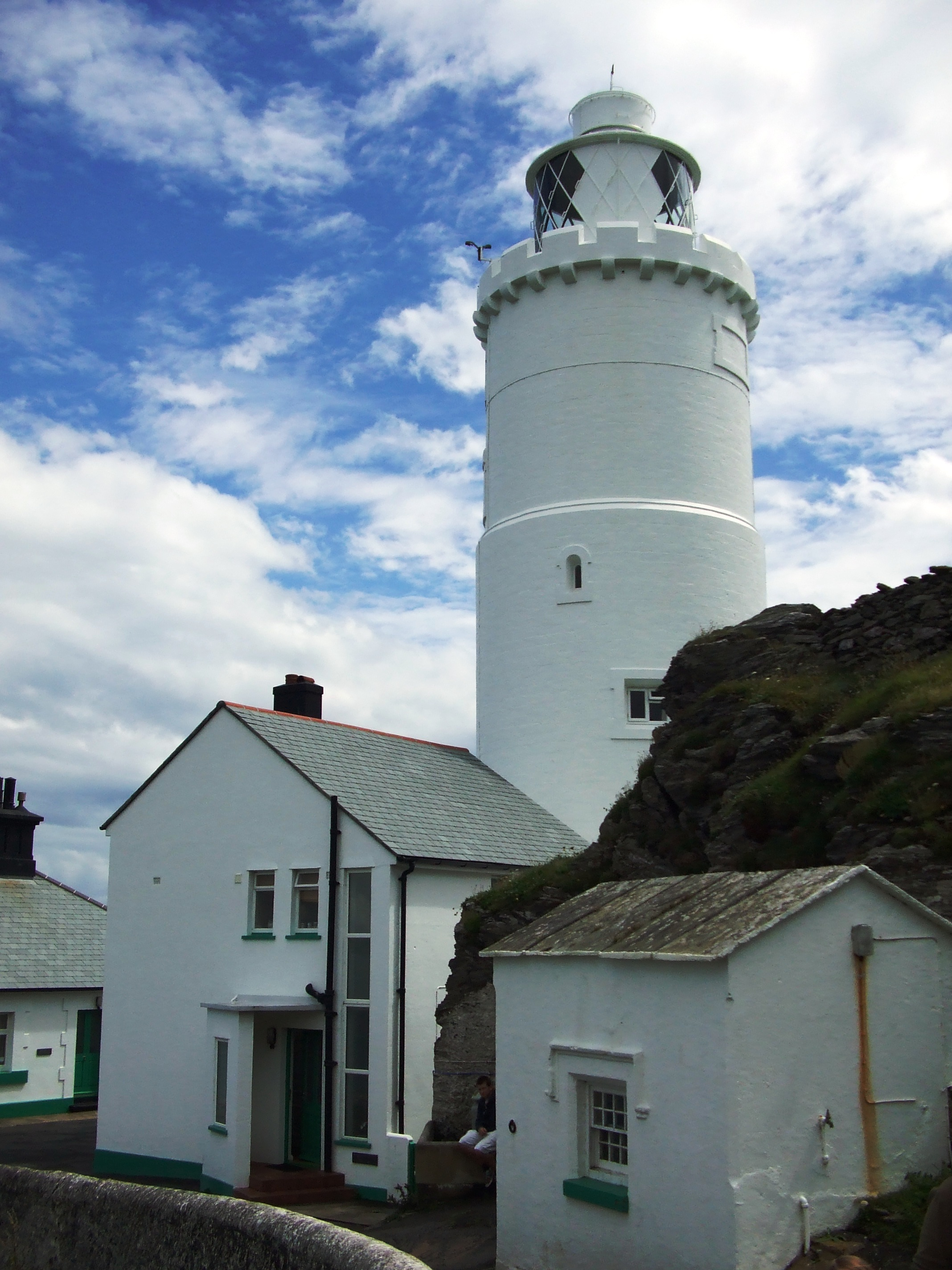
- Start Point lighthouse including the well house and keepers cottage
- Location: Start Point, Stokenham, South Hams, United Kingdom
- OS grid: SX8294237116
- Coordinates: 50°13′21″N 3°38′32″W

Tower
- Constructed: 1836
- Built by: James Walker
- Construction: granite
- Automated: 1993
- Height: 28 m (92 ft)
- Shape: cylindrical tower with balcony and lantern
- Markings: White
- Operator: Trinity House
- Heritage: Grade II listed building
- Fog signal: blast every 60s.

Light
- Focal height: 62 m (203 ft) (white), 55 m (180 ft) (red)
- Lens: third order Fresnel lens
- Intensity: 815,000 candela
- Range: 25 nmi (46 km; 29 mi) (white), 9 nmi (17 km; 10 mi) (red)
- Characteristic: Fl(3) W 10s, F R

Start Point Lighthouse was built in 1836 to protect shipping off Start Point, Devon, England. Open to the public in summer months, it is owned and operated by Trinity House. It has been designated by English Heritage as a grade II listed building.

== History ==
=== Construction ===
Start Point is one of twenty nine towers designed by James Walker. The lighthouse is in the gothic style, topped by a crenellated parapet. The main tower is built of tarred and white-painted granite ashlar with a cast-iron lantern roofed in copper. The tall circular tower is 92 feet (28 m) high with a moulded plinth and pedestal stage and two diminishing stages above that. There are two entrances porches, on the north and south sides. The porch on the south side is blocked and has a 4-centred arch hood mould, whilst the doorway to the north porch has a Tudor arch. Both have raised parapets with Trinity House arms. The inside of the tower includes a cantilevered granite staircase around the inside well of the tower with an iron balustrade completed by a cast-iron newel.

The lighthouse originally had the keepers' living accommodation on the ground and first floors but this was removed in 1871 when new keepers' houses were built, either side of the porches to the north and south. In 1882 another cottage was built, detached from the tower, to the east. All three were designed by James Douglass (though the north and south dwellings were rebuilt in the mid-1950s).

Other nearby buildings were used by the lighthouse keepers, who originally could only get on or off the lighthouse by boat, such as the well-house and piggery.

=== Optics ===
The original main optic consisted of a rotating octagonal array of eight large (first-order) Fresnel lenses, topped by seven tiers of concave mirrors. This was the first time Trinity House had installed a dioptric (i.e. lens-based) optic in one of their lighthouses; manufactured by Cookson & Co of Newcastle-upon-Tyne, the design was based on the improved dioptric system developed from the work of Augustin Fresnel by Alan Stevenson, engineer to the Northern Lighthouse Board.

In 1873, a new lantern was built on top of the tower, designed by James Douglass. In it, a new, more powerful revolving optic was installed, designed by James Timmins Chance: a six-sided symmetrical optic of the first-order, with refracting prisms above and below the central lens elements. At the time its six lens panels (at 60° to the circle) were 'the widest in azimuth hitherto constructed, except some of those of Flamborough Head'; the increase in power, compared to the old 45° lenses, was of the order of 3 to 2. Apparatus of the same design were installed the following year in lighthouses at South Stack and Cape Bon.

In addition to the main light a fixed red subsidiary light is shone from a window in the tower to mark the Skerries Bank. This was commissioned at the same time as the main light (though initially it shone white, not red, and from a higher window). The original light source was a single Argand lamp backed by a 21-inch reflector; but, following the 1873 upgrade, it instead used light diverted by means of prisms from the rear of the main lamp.

The lighthouse was powered by oil until 1959, when it was electrified. At the same time the main optic was replaced by a smaller (third-order) catadioptric lens, made up of two groups of three asymmetrical panels, which produced a group-flashing light characteristic.

Work began on the automation of Start Point Lighthouse in August 1992 and was carried out by LEC Marine at a cost of £82,754. It was completed in early 1993. After automation, the south keepers' cottage (which had been damaged by a landslip in 1989) was demolished. The station is now monitored and controlled from the Trinity House Operations Control Centre at Harwich in Essex via a telemetry link.

In 2018 the rotating optic (which had been in use since 1959) was replaced by a two-tier LED lantern; the old lens was put on display in the adjacent visitor centre.

== Foghorn ==
The light alone was found to be inadequate in fog, and a bell was installed in 1862; the machinery was housed in a small building which still stands on the cliff face to the south-east of the lighthouse. It sounded 48 times every minute, the mechanism being driven by a weight which fell in a tube running down the sheer cliff. A siren replaced the bell in 1877; (the bell was transferred to the lighthouse on Plymouth Breakwater where it still hangs).

The fog siren was housed in a circular building, just to the south of the lighthouse, and sounded (one blast every three minutes) through a roof-mounted horizontal horn which could be turned in the direction of the prevailing wind. The fog signal was upgraded in 1883 by the installation of a two-tone siren; it now sounded thrice every three minutes (high, then low, then high). Around the turn of the century new equipment was installed, including a new pair of 5" sirens sounding through a pair of curved vertical copper trumpets. This was in turn replaced by a more powerful 12" siren in 1928, again housed in the same building, sounded from a pair of conical horns housed in a cast-iron turret on the roof. At the same time a pair of Gardner diesel engines were provided to drive the air compressors, replacing an earlier set of engines.

In 1989, the erosion of the coast caused the fog signal building to collapse. A lot of the area had to be levelled as a result and retaining walls put in place. An electric signal was instead installed on the gallery of the lighthouse (this is itself scheduled for replacement by a more modern system in 2018). When required the foghorn sounds once every 60 seconds.

== Gallery ==
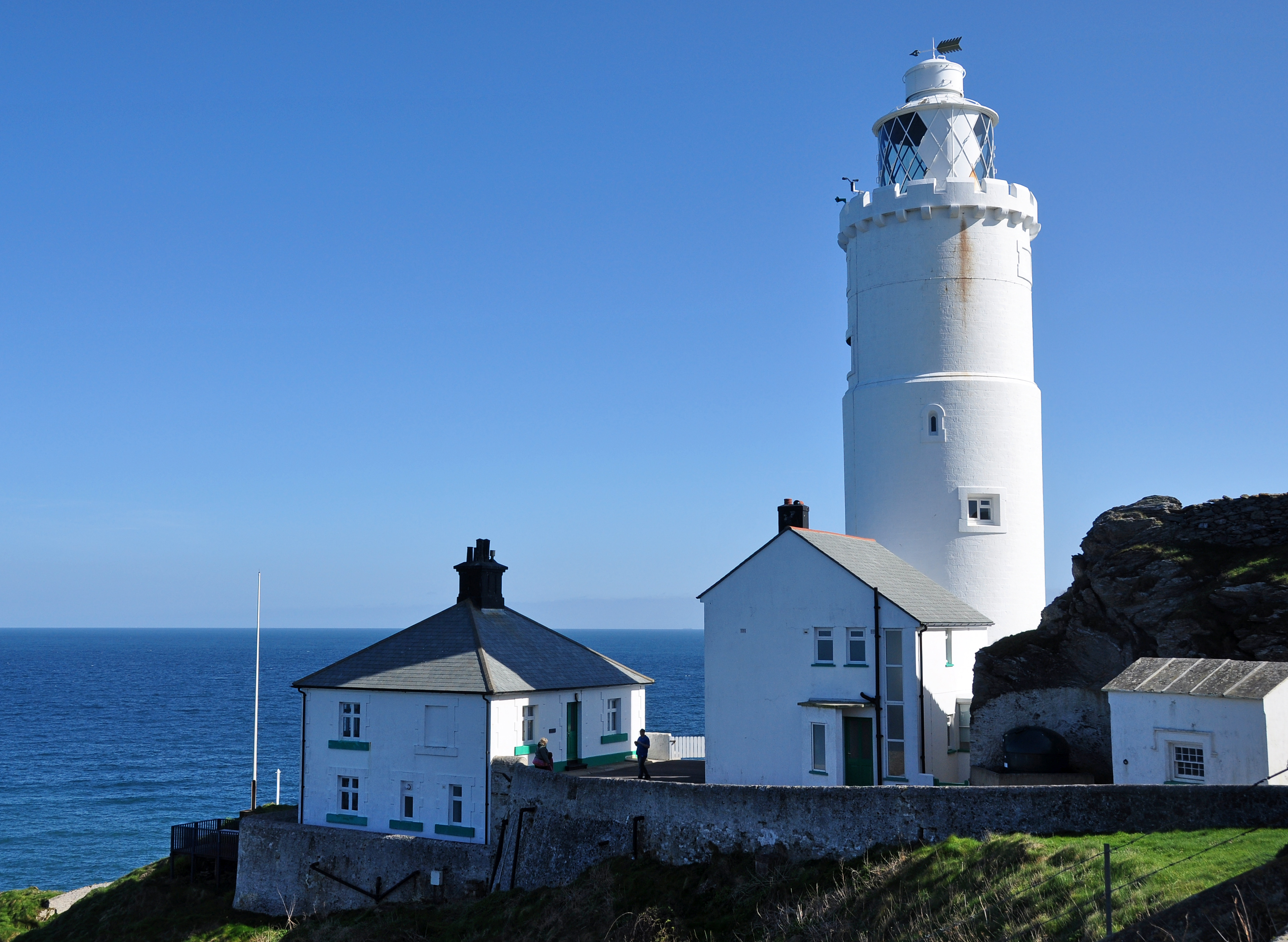
The lighthouse complex

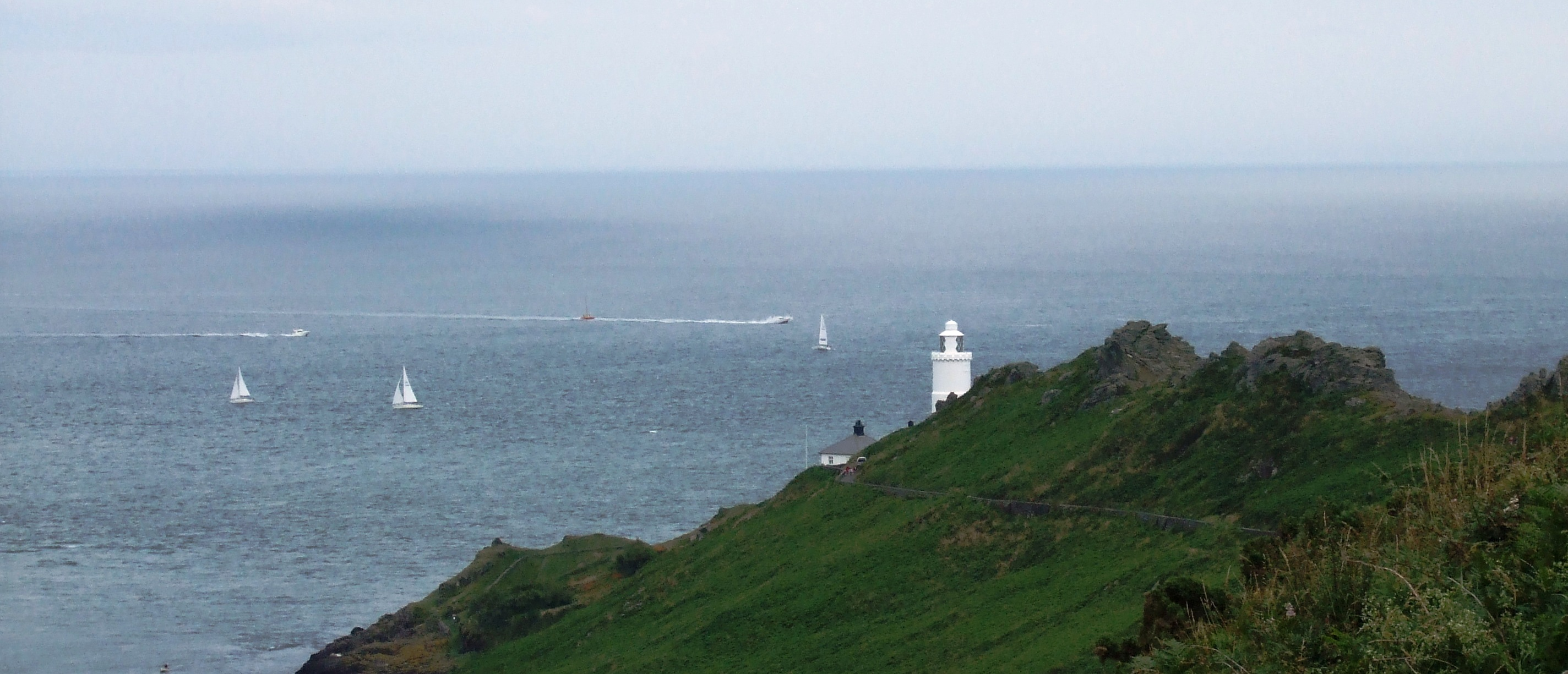
The lighthouse seen from the inland end of the peninsula

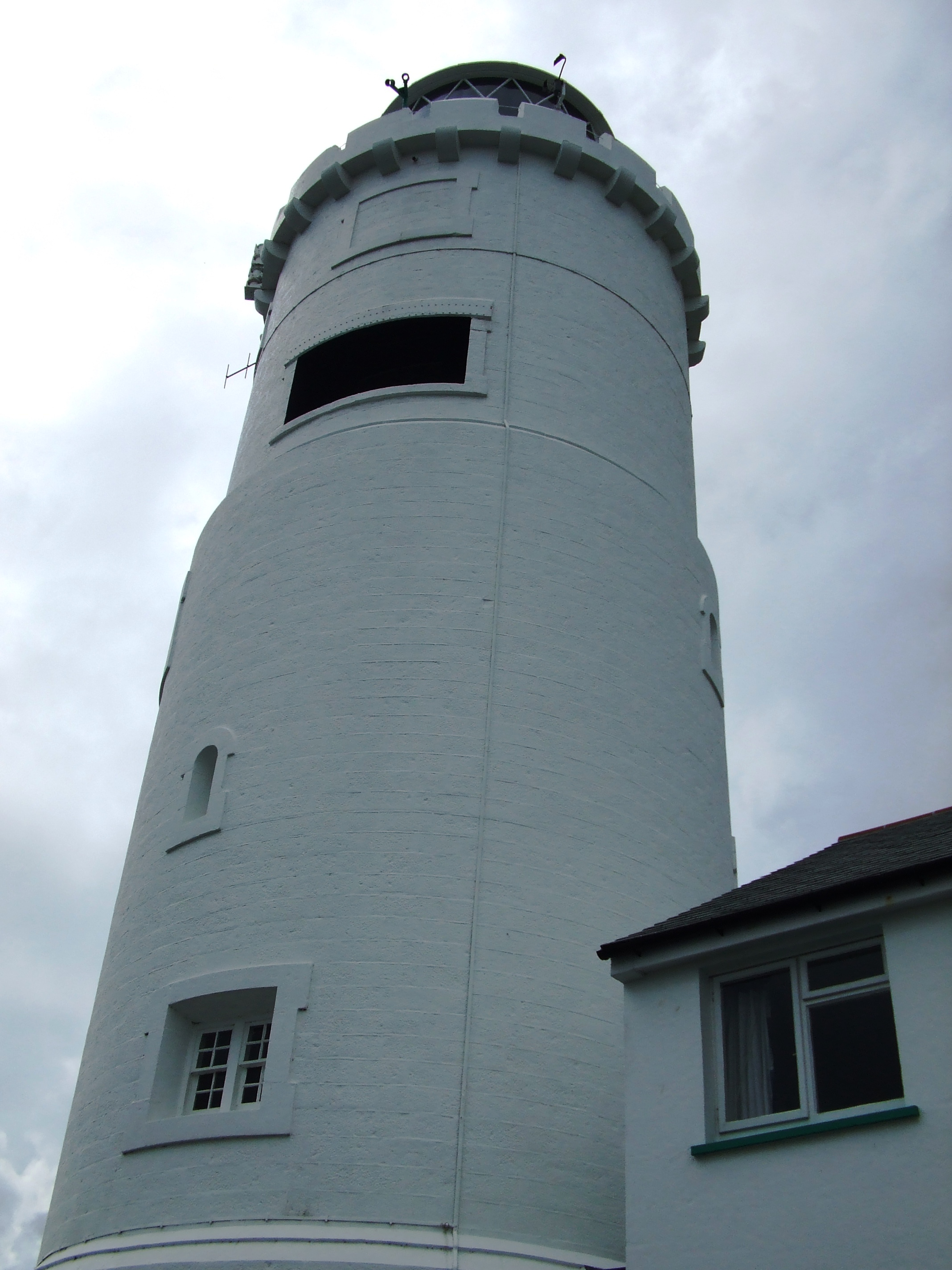
Close up showing masonry construction

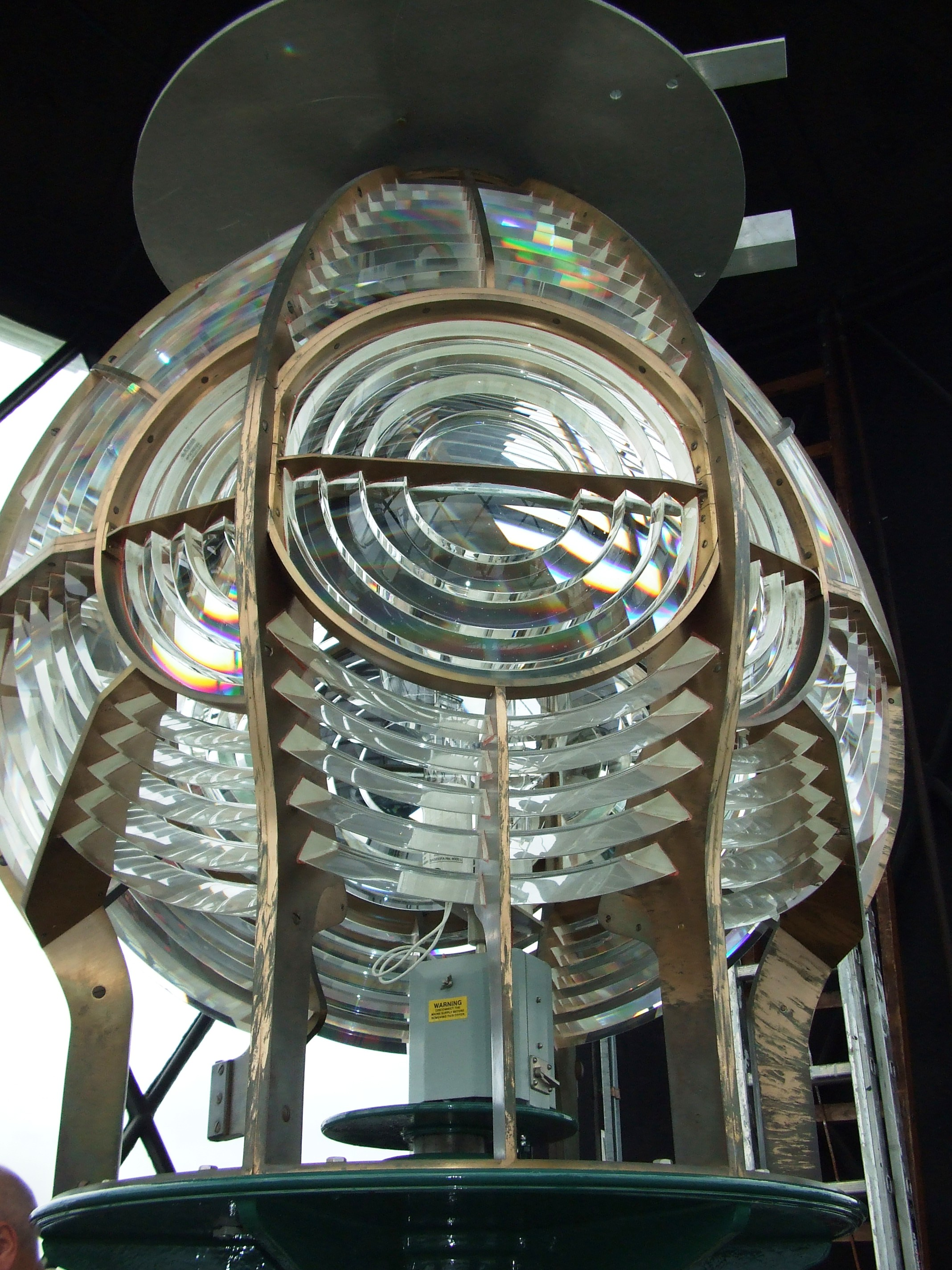
The lens

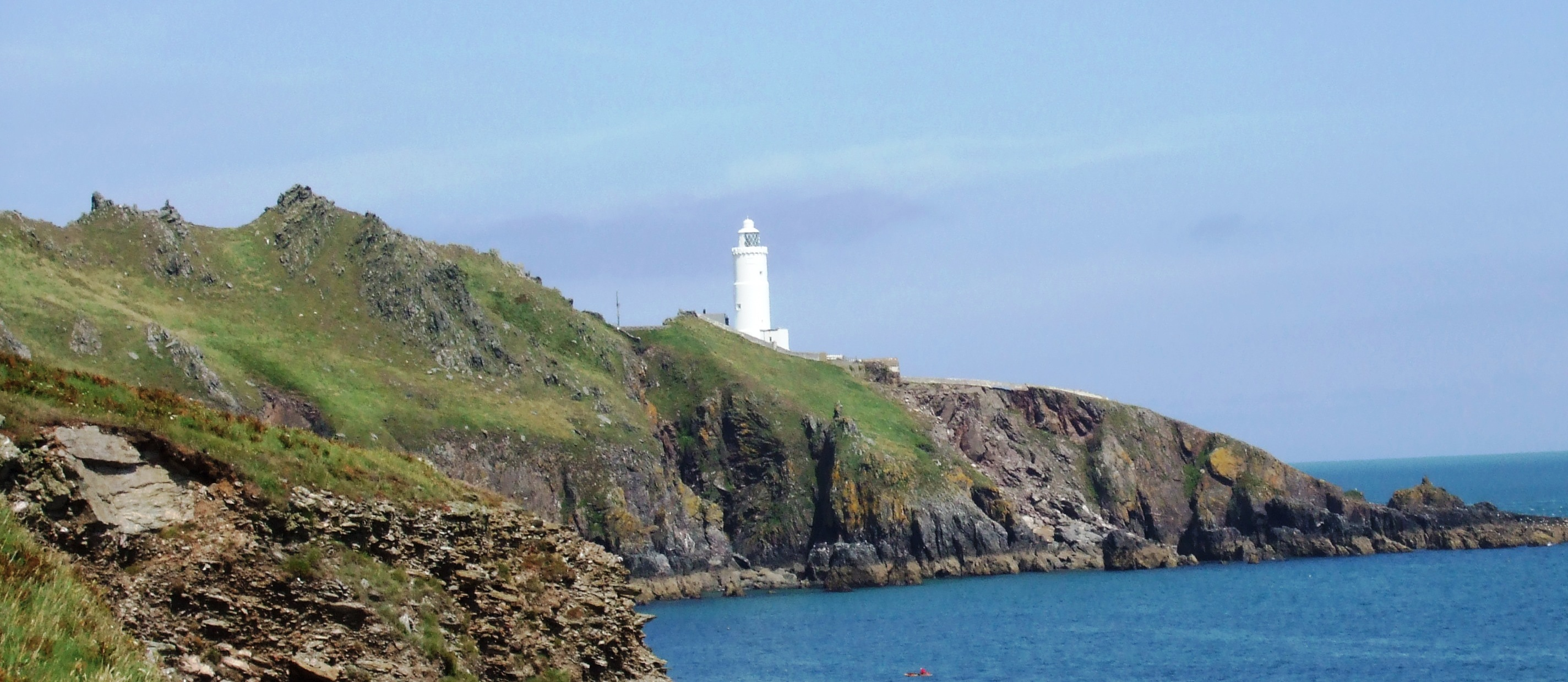
Seen from the South West Coast Path to the west of the lighthouse

== See also ==
- List of lighthouses in England
