= No. 254 Squadron RAF =

Defunct flying squadron of the Royal Air Force

- Active: 25 July 1918 - 22 February 1919; 30 October 1939 - 1 October 1946; 1 December 1959 - 23 August 1963 (as 254(SM) Sqn.)
- Country: United Kingdom
- Allegiance: British Armed Forces
- Branch: Royal Air Force
- Type: Flying squadron
- Role: Coastal Reconnaissance (WW1); Anti-shipping (WW2); Strategic Missile Force (Cold War)
- Garrison/HQ: RNAS Prawle Point; RAF Melton Mowbray
- Equipment: DH.6 (WW1); DH.9 (WW1); Bristol Blenheim (WW2); Bristol Beaufighter (WW2); Thor IRBM (Cold War)

No. 254 Squadron of the Royal Air Force was the designation of a number of units formed throughout the 20th century.

== History ==
=== World War One ===
No. 254 Squadron first formed in 1918 as a coastal reconnaissance squadron operating from Prawle Point. The squadron was divided into flights with 492 (Light Bomber) Flight operating the DH.9s and 515 and 516 (Special Duties) Flights the DH.6s. After the cessation of hostilities it was disbanded in February 1919. It operated the DH.6 and DH.9.

=== World War Two ===
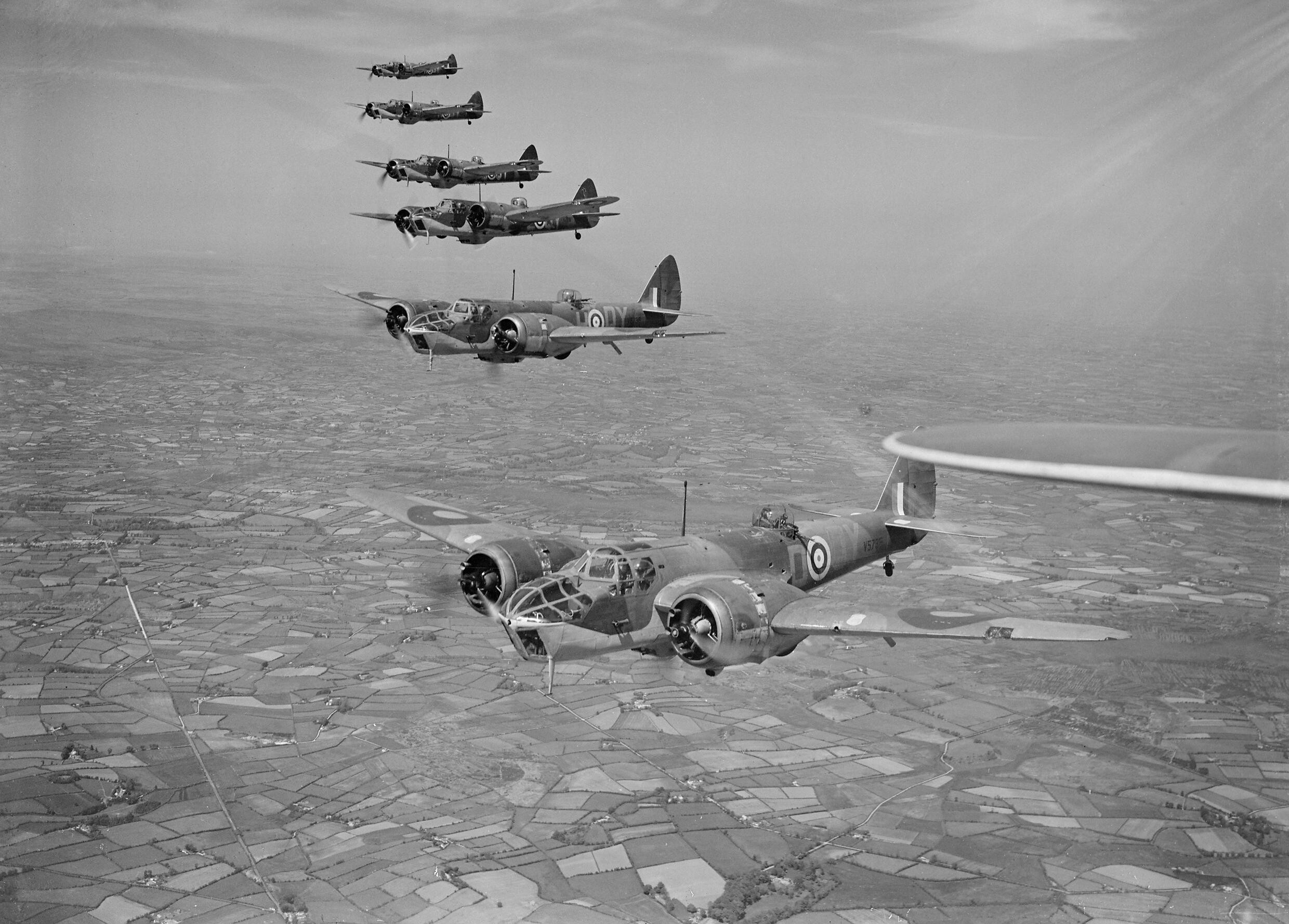
Bristol Blenheim Mk IVFs of No. 254 Squadron RAF flying from Aldergrove in Northern Ireland, May 1941

No. 254 was reformed shortly after the outbreak of the Second World War in October 1939 as part of Coastal Command. Its duties consisted of patrolling the North Sea Fishing fleet, convoy escort work, and reconnaissance.

The unit operated Bristol Blenheim IVFs equipped as long-range fighters with a ventral gun pack, until 1942, before re-equipping with the Bristol Beaufighter. In 1941 the unit introduced torpedoes and primarily operated in an anti-shipping role for the rest of the war, with a focus on anti-U-boat work from early 1945.

In October 1946 they re-numbered as No. 42 Squadron RAF.

=== Cold War ===
The squadron was reformed again in 1959 as one of 20 Strategic Missile (SM) squadrons associated with Project Emily. The squadron was equipped with three Thor Intermediate range ballistic missiles. and based at RAF Melton Mowbray.

In October 1962, during the Cuban Missile Crisis, the squadron was kept at full readiness, with the missiles aimed at strategic targets in the USSR. The squadron was disbanded with the termination of the Thor Program in Britain, in 1963.

== See also ==
- William Robinson Clarke
