= No. 104 Squadron RAF =

Defunct flying squadron of the Royal Air Force

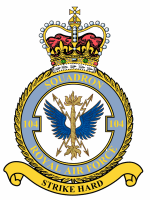
- Active: 4 September 1917 - 31 June 1919; 7 January 1936 – 8 April 1940; 1 April 1941 – 1 April 1947; 15 March 1955 – 1 August 1956; 22 July 1959 - 24 May 1963
- Country: United Kingdom
- Branch: Royal Air Force
- Motto: Strike hard

Insignia
- Squadron badge heraldry: A winged thunderbolt.The device in conjunction with the motto implies the unit's formidable intentions and power.
- Squadron codes: 104 Jan 1936 - Apr 1939; PO Allocated Apr 1939 - Sep 1939; EP Sep 1939 - Apr 1940, Mar 1941 - Apr 1947

No. 104 Squadron RAF is a former squadron of the British Royal Air Force.

== History ==
=== First World War ===
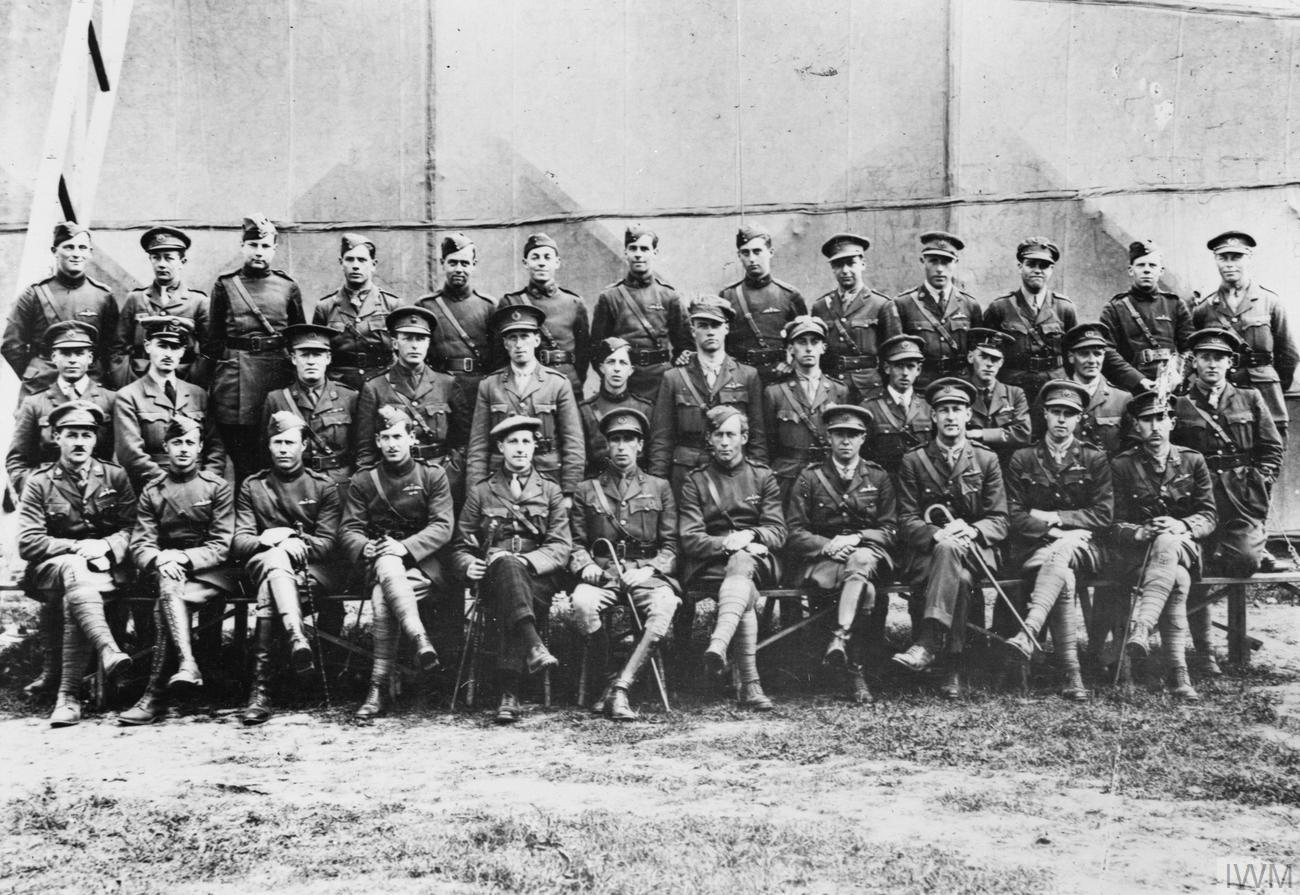
Officers of 104 Squadron RFC at Andover before the squadron set off for France, early 1918.

No. 104 Squadron was formed at Wyton, England on 4 September 1917 equipped with the DH 9. It then moved to Andover, prior to being posted to France in May 1918 to form part of the Independent Air Force. The squadron later began re-equipping with the Airco DH.10 Amiens, however the armistice arrived before this was completed and the squadron returned home, first to Turnhouse and then to Crail where it disbanded on 30 June 1919. Eight flying aces served within its ranks, including future Rear Admiral Arthur Rullion Rattray, Jeffrey Batters Home-Hay, William Bottrill, Richard Gammon and W. Harrop.

=== Between the wars ===
On 7 January 1936, the squadron was reformed at Abingdon from the 'C' Flight of No. 40 Squadron. The squadron was equipped with the Hawker Hind. In August 1936 the squadron moved to RAF Hucknall, followed by a move to Bassingbourn in May 1938, and conversion to the Bristol Blenheim.

=== Second World War ===
The squadron disbanded when it was absorbed into No. 13 Operational Training Unit in April 1940.

No. 104 Squadron reformed again on 1 April 1941 at RAF Driffield, equipped with the Vickers Wellington and began night bombing operations in May as part of No. 4 Group RAF until February 1942. A squadron detachment was sent to Malta in October 1941, moving to Egypt in January 1942, shortly afterwards the home contingent of the squadron at Driffield was renumbered No. 158, whilst the remainder of the squadron in the Middle East remained No. 104. The squadron later moved first to captured airfields in Tunisia, followed by a move to the Italian mainland in December 1943.

In February 1945 the squadron was re-equipped with the Consolidated Liberator, and then returned to Egypt in November 1945 where it converted to the Avro Lancaster. The squadron disbanded on 1 April 1947.

=== Postwar ===
In March 1955 No. 104 Squadron reformed at Gutersloh equipped with the English Electric Canberra. Appointed as CO by April 1955 was Squadron Leader Edward Stephenson, an experienced flying instructor. The squadron became part of No. 551 Wing RAF, the Bomber Command Element of 2TAF: this consisted of Nos 102, 103, 104 and 149 Squadrons - each equipped with ten Canberra B2s. The squadron disbanded again in August 1956.

The squadron was again reformed - as No. 104 (Strategic Missile) Squadron - on 22 July 1959, one of 20 squadrons associated with Project Emily. The squadron was equipped with three PGM-17 Thor Intermediate range ballistic missiles. and based at RAF Ludford Magna.

In October 1962, during the Cuban Missile Crisis, the squadron was kept at full readiness, with the missiles aimed at strategic targets in the USSR. The squadron was disbanded on 24 May 1963, with the termination of the Thor Program in Britain.

== Aircraft operated ==
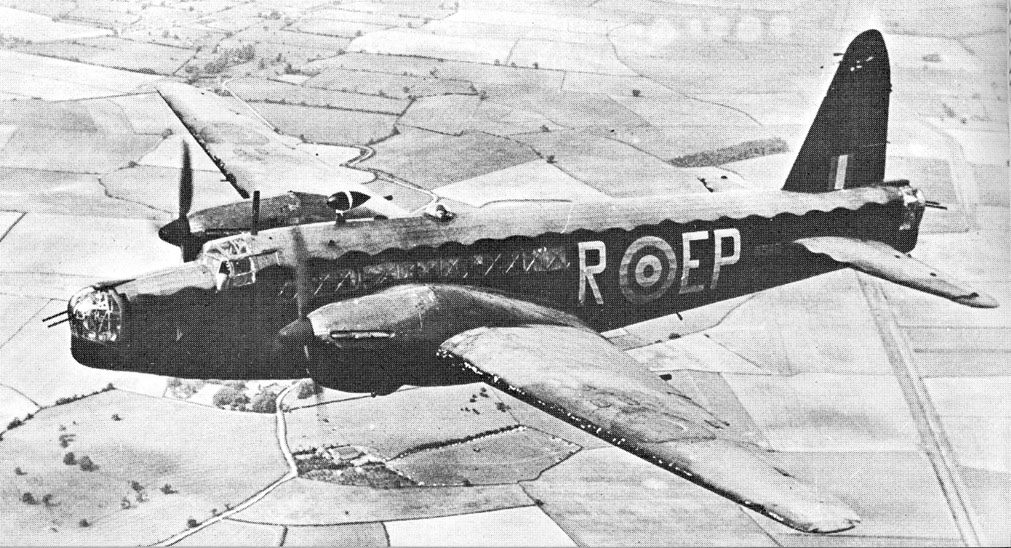
Wellington Mk.II of No. 104 Squadron, 1941-43.

- 1918–1919 Airco DH.9
- 1918–1919 Airco DH.10 Amiens
- 1936–1938 Hawker Hind
- 1938–1940 Bristol Blenheim I
- 1939–1940 Avro Anson I
- 1939–1940 Bristol Blenheim IV
- 1941–1943 Vickers Wellington II
- 1943–1945 Vickers Wellington X
- 1945–1946 Consolidater Liberator VI
- 1945–1947 Avro Lancaster B7(FE)
- 1955–1956 English Electric Canberra B2
- 1959–1963 Thor IRBM

== See also ==
- List of UK Thor missile bases
