= Full Sutton Airfield =

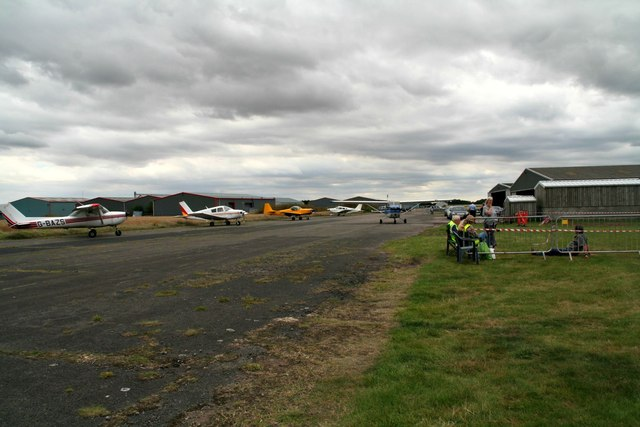
- Taxiway at Full Sutton
- IATA: none; ICAO: EGNU

Summary
- Airport type: Public
- Operator: Full Sutton Flying Centre Ltd
- Serves: York
- Location: Full Sutton
- Elevation AMSL: 86 ft (26 m)
- Coordinates: 53°58′50″N 000°51′53″W
- Website: www.fullsuttonairfield.co.uk

Map
- Location in the East Riding of Yorkshire

Runways
Direction	Length		Surface
Direction	m	ft	Surface
04/22	772	2,533	Grass
- Sources: Full Sutton Airfield

Full Sutton Airfield (ICAO: EGNU) is an unlicensed aerodrome located 8 nautical miles (15 km; 9.2 mi) east of York in the East Riding of Yorkshire, England. It is located adjacent to, and south-east of, Full Sutton Prison.

The Airfield occupies the location of the former RAF station Full Sutton. It previously held a CAA Ordinary Licence that allowed flights for the public transport of passengers, or for flying instruction as authorised by the licensee, Full Sutton Flying Centre Limited. This licence was given up in 2011. The airfield is not licensed for night use.

== Facilities and services ==
Full Sutton provides instruction for the Private Pilot Licence (PPL), Night Rating (NR), and Instrument Rating Restricted (IRR). The airfield employs two flying instructors. Facilities include a club house for the airfield flying club, hangars, control room, and on-site aircraft maintenance. It provides hire for the following aircraft types:

- Cessna 150
- Cessna 172
- Piper PA 28 Cherokee 140
- Piper PA 28 Warrior 160
- Slingsby T67 Firefly
- Cessna 310

=== Runway ===
Runway 04/22 at Full Sutton is a grass surface, 772 by 19 m (2,533 by 62 ft) strip and is the only runway in use at the aerodrome.
