= 2017 =

2017 in various calendars
- Gregorian calendar: 2017; MMXVII
- Ab urbe condita: 2770
- Armenian calendar: 1466; ԹՎ ՌՆԿԶ
- Assyrian calendar: 6767
- Baháʼí calendar: 173–174
- Balinese saka calendar: 1938–1939
- Bengali calendar: 1423–1424
- Berber calendar: 2967
- British Regnal year: 65 Eliz. 2 – 66 Eliz. 2
- Buddhist calendar: 2561
- Burmese calendar: 1379
- Byzantine calendar: 7525–7526
- Chinese calendar: 丙申年 (Fire Monkey); 4714 or 4507 — to — 丁酉年 (Fire Rooster); 4715 or 4508
- Coptic calendar: 1733–1734
- Discordian calendar: 3183
- Ethiopian calendar: 2009–2010
- Hebrew calendar: 5777–5778
- Hindu calendars
- Vikram Samvat: 2073–2074
- Shaka Samvat: 1938–1939
- Kali Yuga: 5117–5118
- Holocene calendar: 12017
- Igbo calendar: 1017–1018
- Iranian calendar: 1395–1396
- Islamic calendar: 1438–1439
- Japanese calendar: Heisei 29 (平成２９年)
- Javanese calendar: 1950–1951
- Juche calendar: 106
- Julian calendar: Gregorian minus 13 days
- Korean calendar: 4350
- Minguo calendar: ROC 106 民國106年
- Nanakshahi calendar: 549
- Thai solar calendar: 2560
- Tibetan calendar: མེ་ཕོ་སྤྲེ་ལོ་ (male Fire-Monkey); 2143 or 1762 or 990 — to — མེ་མོ་བྱ་ལོ་ (female Fire-Bird); 2144 or 1763 or 991
- Unix time: 1483228800 – 1514764799

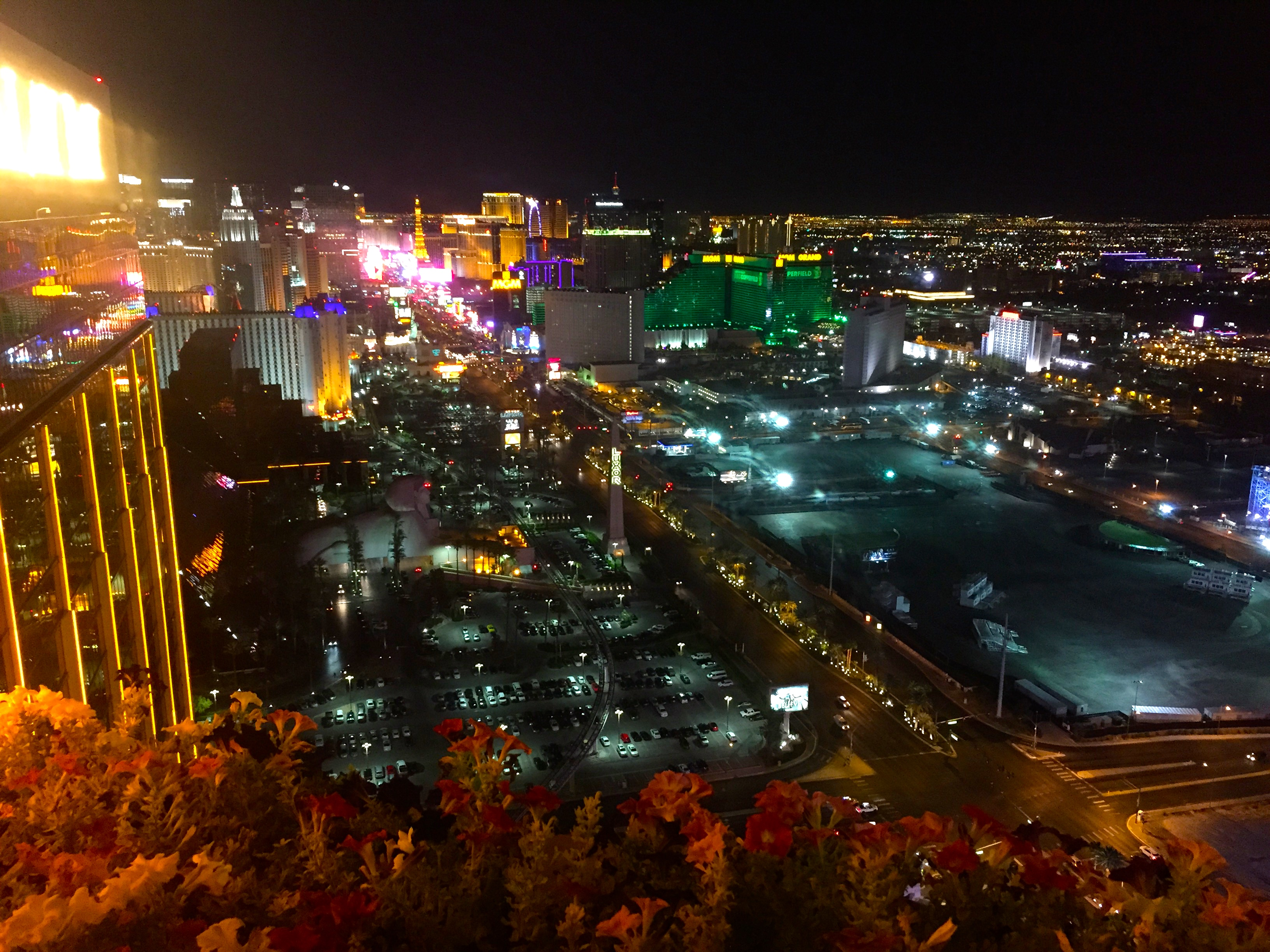
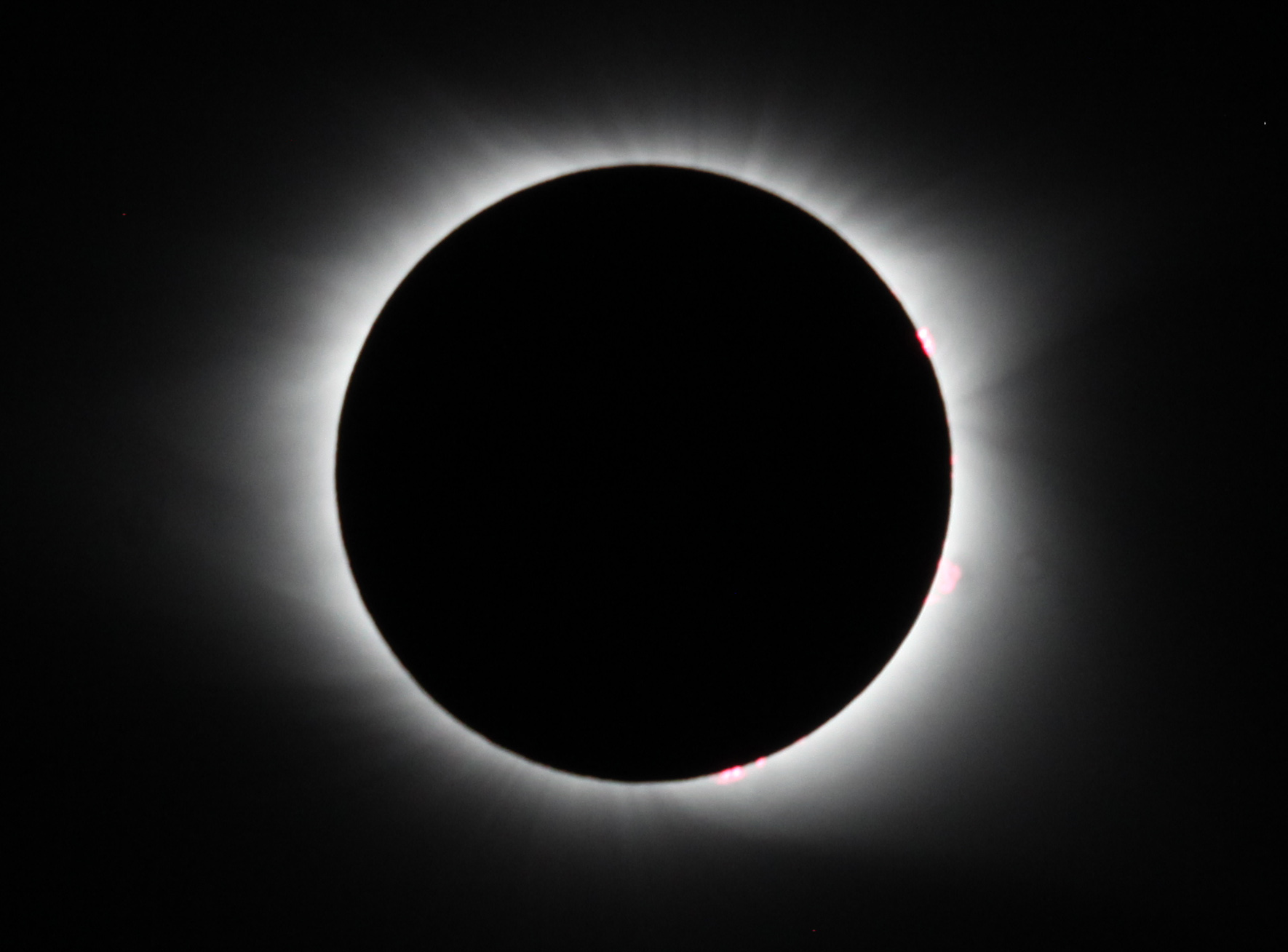
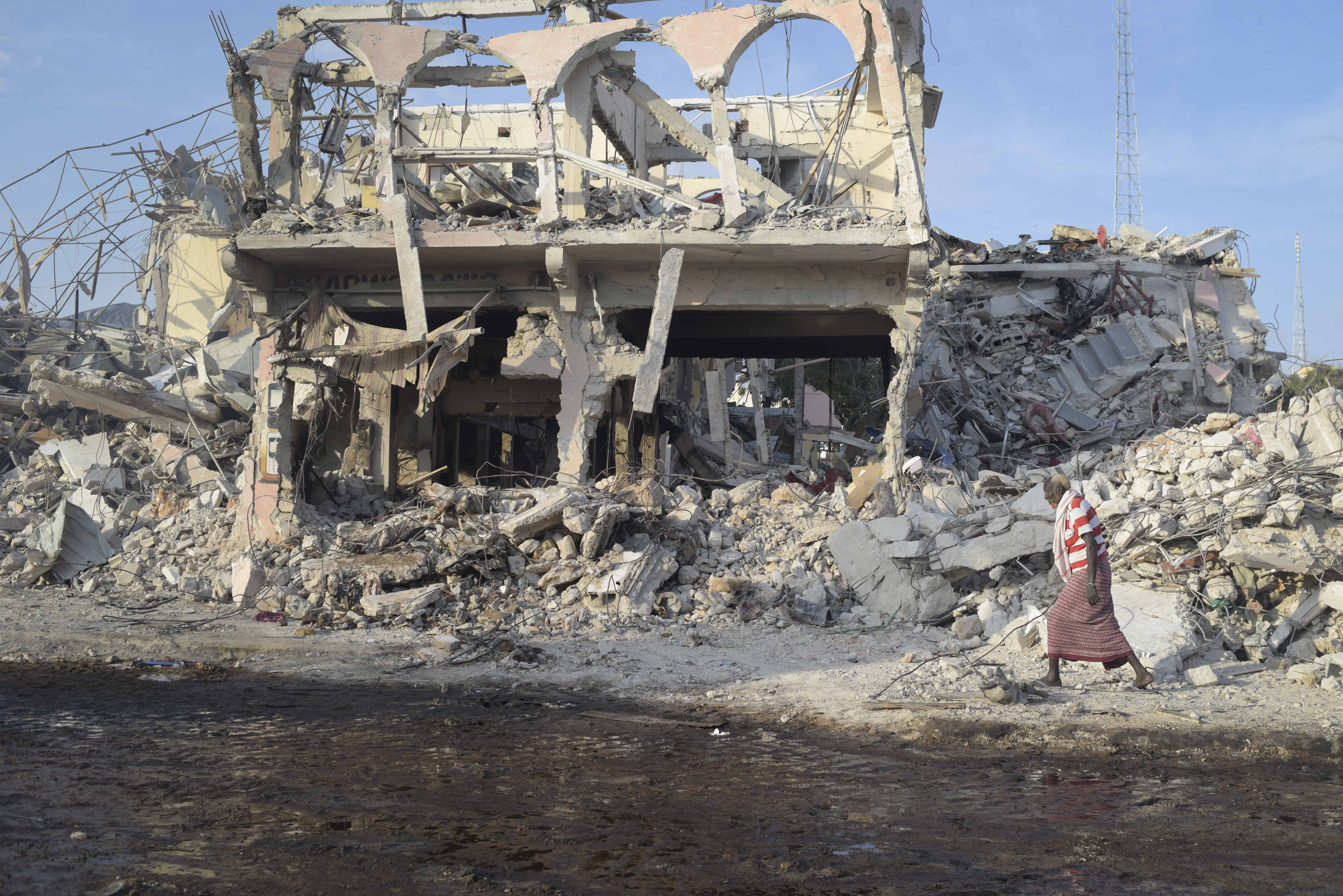
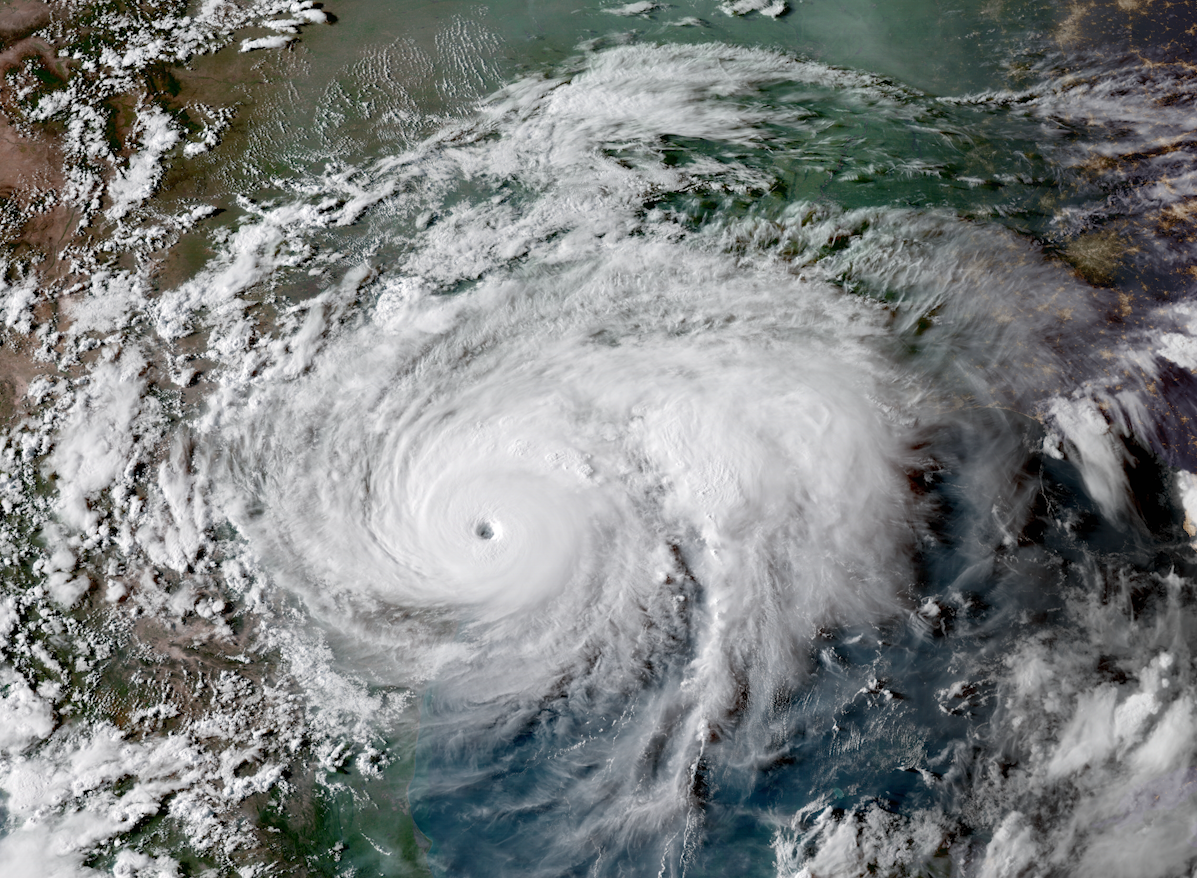
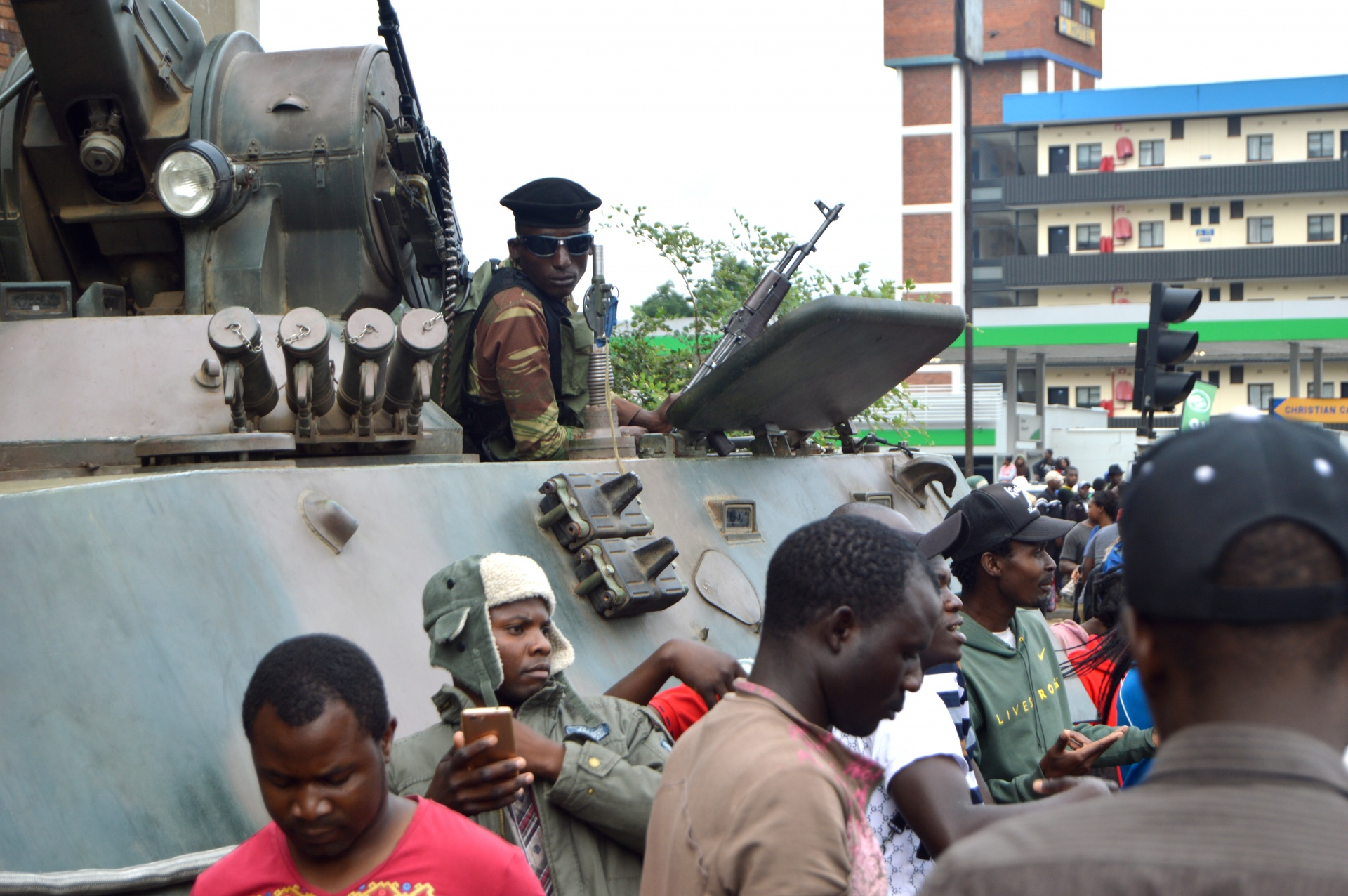
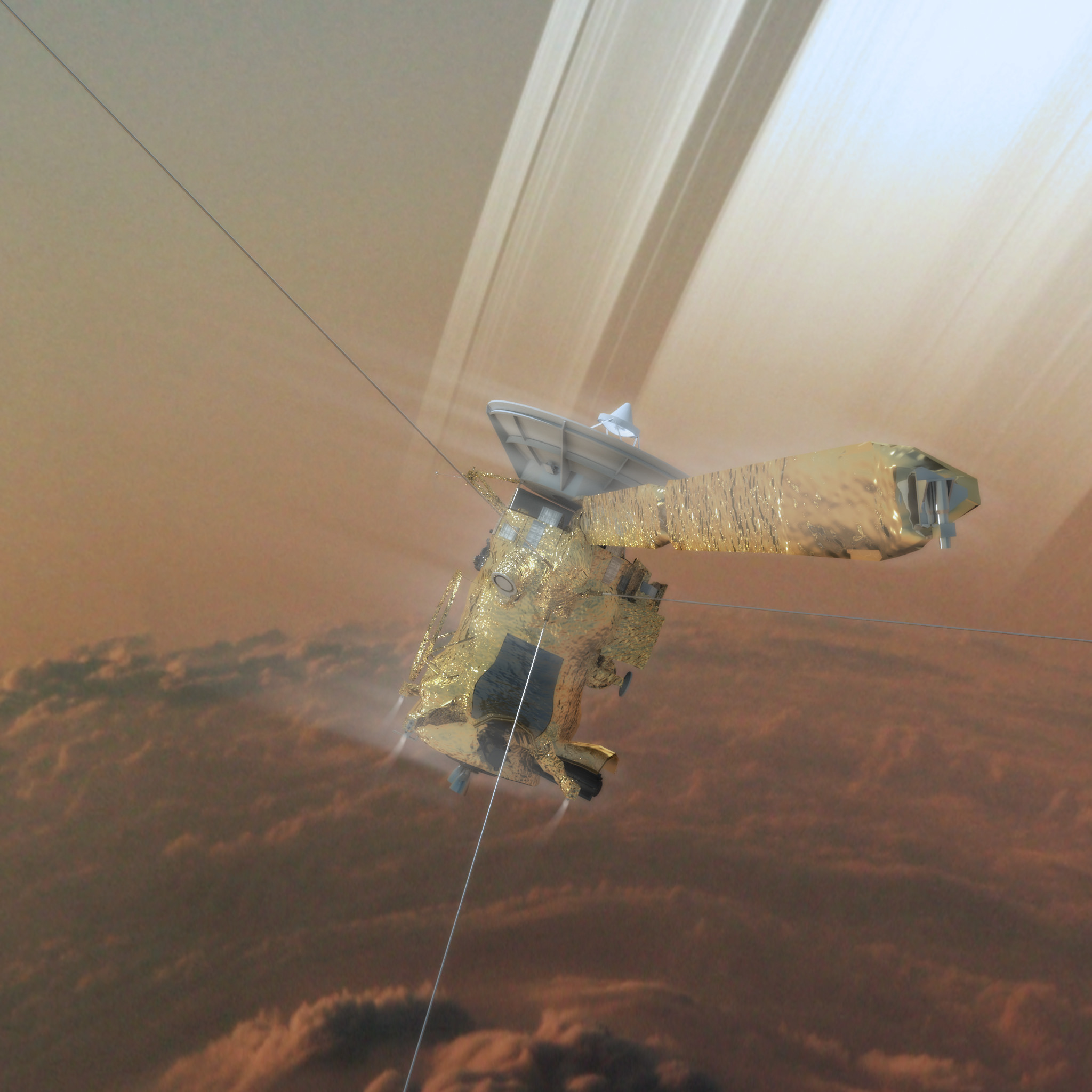
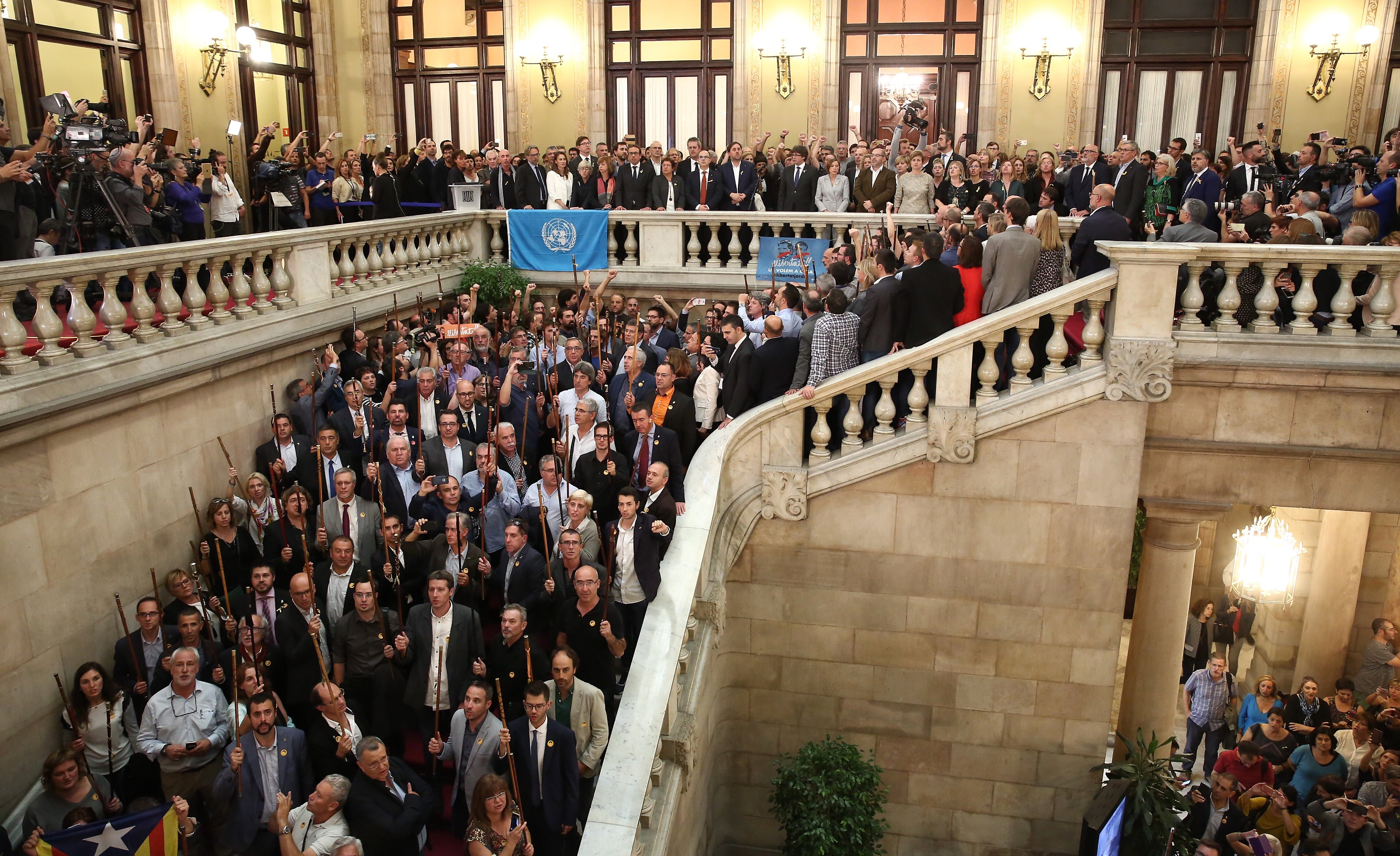
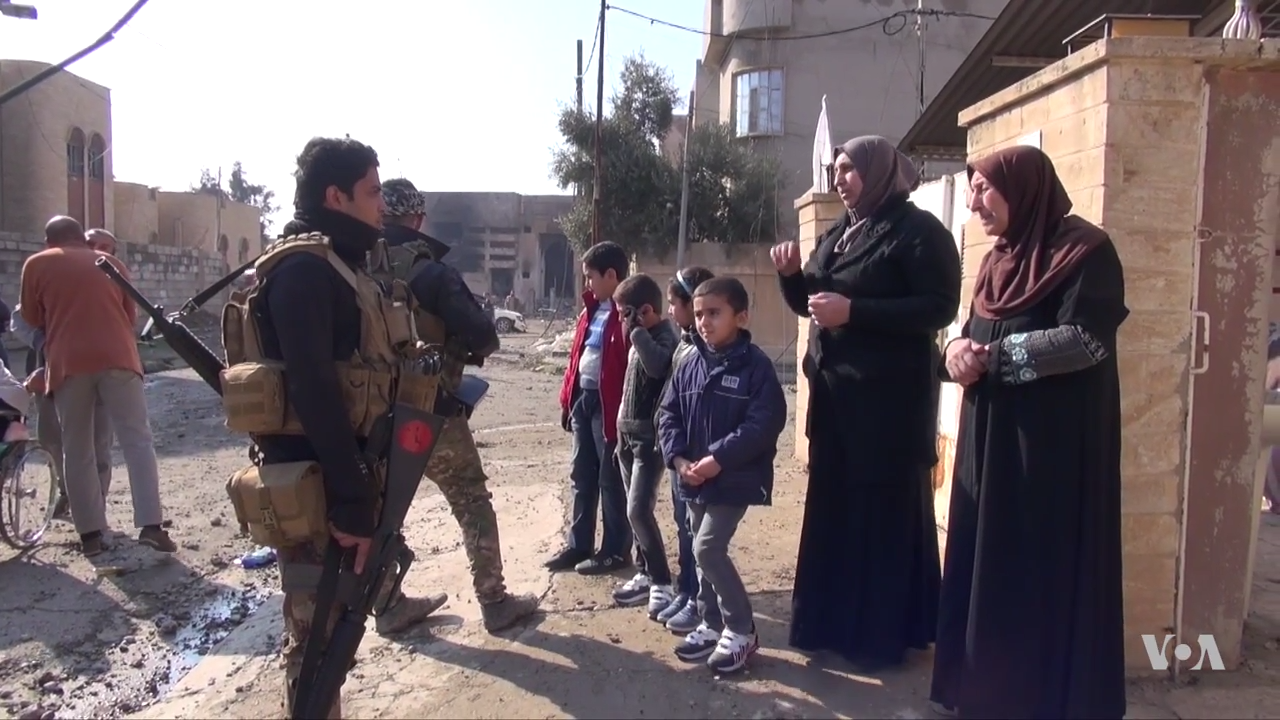
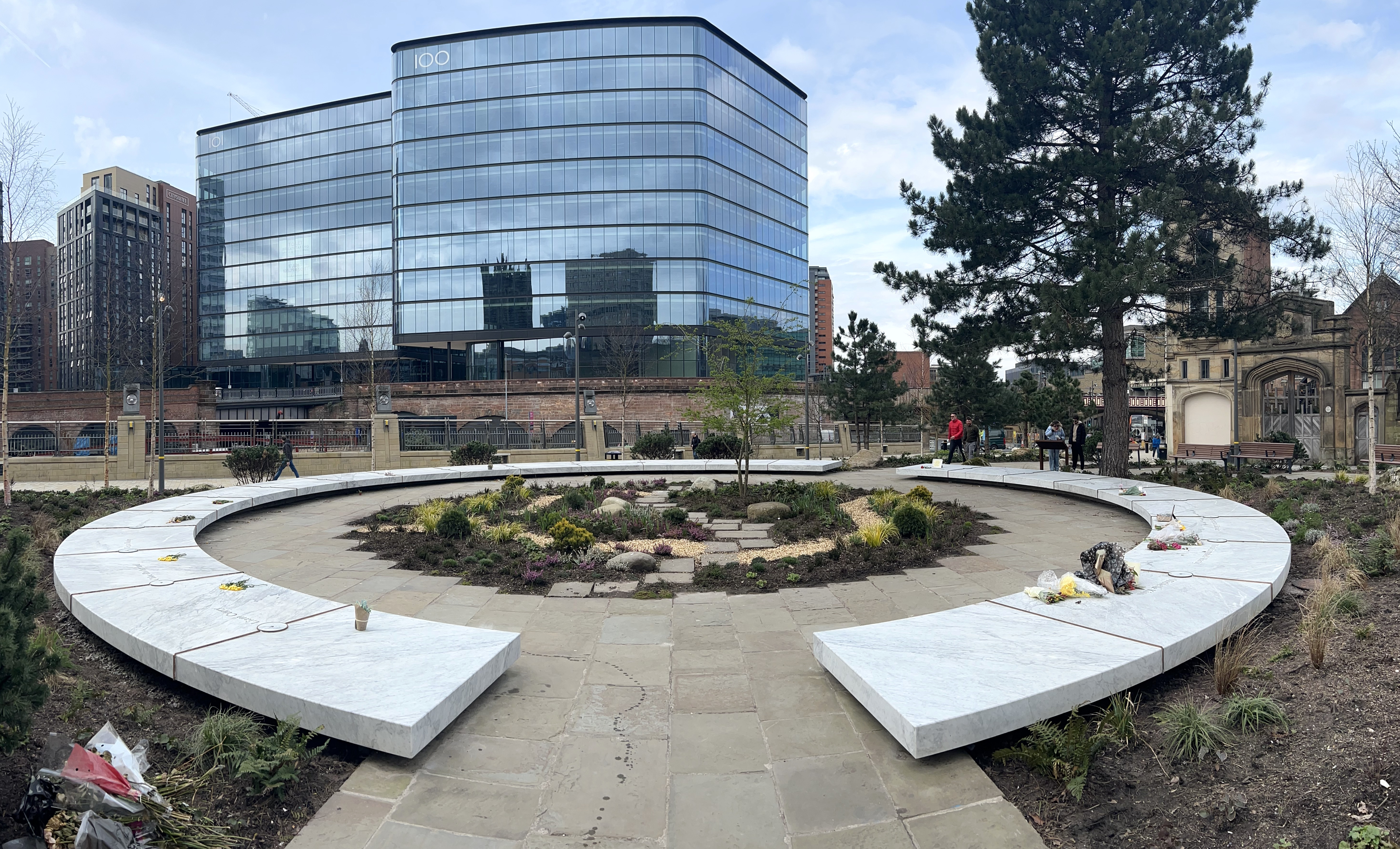
From left to right, top to bottom:
- The shooting site of the Las Vegas shooting. Stephen Paddock shot and killed 60 and injured more than 400 attending a music festival from the 32nd floor of the Mandalay Bay hotel, making it the deadliest mass shooting in American history;
- Images of the solar eclipse of August 21, 2017, dubbed the Great American Eclipse;
- Two truck bombings kill at least 587 in Mogadishu, Somalia;
- The 2017 Atlantic hurricane season, including Harvey (pictured), Irma, and Maria, becomes the costliest recorded in history;
- A military coup deposes Zimbabwean president Robert Mugabe, who had led the country for 37 years;
- After 13 years of orbiting Saturn, the Cassini-Huygens spacecraft ends its mission;
- The Parliament of Catalonia declares the independence from Spain following Catalonia's referendum on independence, which was not recognized by any country and produced no legal effect;
- The Iraqi armed forces recaptures Mosul during the war in the country against the Islamic State;
- The Glade of Light, the memorial to the bombing following an Ariana Grande concert in Manchester, England; the attack killed 23 and injured over a thousand.

2017 (MMXVII) was a common year starting on Sunday of the Gregorian calendar, the 2017th year of the Common Era (CE) and Anno Domini (AD) designations, the 17th year of the 3rd millennium and the 21st century, and the 8th year of the 2010s decade.

2017 was designated as the International Year of Sustainable Tourism for Development by the United Nations General Assembly.

== Events ==
=== January ===
- January 1 – Istanbul nightclub shooting: A gunman dressed as Santa Claus opens fire at the Reina nightclub in Istanbul, Turkey, killing 39 people and injuring 79 others.
- January 8 – 2017 Jerusalem truck attack: A Palestinian assailant entered the road where the Israeli defense forces were located with a truck, killing 4 people and injuring 15 others.
- January 16 – Turkish Airlines Flight 6491, a cargo flight en route from Hong Kong to Istanbul via Bishkek, Kyrgyzstan, crashes in a residential area while attempting to land at Manas International Airport, Bishkek, killing all four crew members on board and 35 people on the ground.
- January 19 – 2016–2017 Gambian constitutional crisis: The Economic Community of West African States (ECOWAS) launches a military intervention in the Gambia after Yahya Jammeh refuses to cede power following the 2016 presidential elections.
- January 21
  - 2016–2017 Gambian constitutional crisis: Following the military intervention of ECOWAS, President Yahya Jammeh resigns from office after 23 years in power and flees into exile to Equatorial Guinea; the democratically elected Adama Barrow assumes office as President of The Gambia.
  - Millions of people worldwide join the Women's March following the inauguration of Donald Trump as President of the United States. 420 marches were reported in the U.S. and 168 in other countries, becoming the largest single-day protest in American history at the time.
- January 27 – U.S. President Donald Trump issues executive order banning travel and immigration from seven Muslim-majority nations. Protests against the immigration order erupt nationwide for about two weeks.
- January 29 – A gunman opens fire at a mosque in Quebec City, Canada, killing 6 and injuring 19 others.
- January 30 – Morocco rejoins the African Union.

=== February ===
- February 5 – 2017 Liechtenstein general election: The Progressive Citizens' Party led by Adrian Hasler retains a plurality of 9 seats in the Landtag.
- February 11 – North Korea prompts international condemnation by test firing a ballistic missile across the Sea of Japan.
- February 13 – Assassination of Kim Jong-nam: Kim Jong-nam, the eldest son of deceased North Korean leader Kim Jong-il and the half-brother of current North Korean leader Kim Jong-un, is killed after being attacked by two women with VX nerve agent at Kuala Lumpur International Airport in Malaysia.
- February 26 – An annular solar eclipse is visible from Pacific, Chile, Argentina, Atlantic, Africa. It is the 29th eclipse of the 140th saros cycle (descending node), which started with a partial solar eclipse visible in the Southern Hemisphere on April 16, 1512, and will conclude with another partial solar eclipse visible in the Northern Hemisphere on June 1, 2774.

=== March ===
- March 3 – Nintendo releases the Switch worldwide.
- March 10 – The UN warns that the world is facing the largest humanitarian crisis since World War II, with up to 20 million people at risk of starvation and famine in Yemen, Somalia, South Sudan and Nigeria.
- March 14 – March 2017 North American blizzard: A major late-season blizzard affects the Northeastern United States, New England and Canada, dumping up to three feet of snow in the hardest hit areas.
- March 29 – The United Kingdom triggers Article 50 of the Lisbon Treaty, starting the Brexit negotiations, the talks for the United Kingdom to leave the European Union.
- March 30 – SpaceX conducts the world's first reflight of an orbital-class rocket.
- March 31 – Horacio Cartes presents to Congress his plans of allowing the re-election of the president of Paraguay for a second term, going against the Constitution of Paraguay, leading to a political crisis which ended in the storm of Congress by liberal activists and in the assassination of Rodrigo Quintana by the police. After this, the Congress votes against the re-election project.

=== April ===
- April 7 – In response to a suspected chemical weapons attack on a rebel-held town, the U.S. military launches 59 Tomahawk cruise missiles at an air base in Syria. Russia describes the strikes as an "aggression", adding they significantly damage U.S.–Russia ties.
- April 13 – In the 2017 Nangarhar airstrike, the U.S. drops the GBU-43/B MOAB, the world's largest non-nuclear weapon, at an ISIL base in the Nangarhar Province of eastern Afghanistan.
- April 15 – Emma Morano, an Italian supercentenarian, becomes the last known person born in the 19th century to die.
- April 25 – The Parliamentary Assembly of the Council of Europe (PACE) unanimously adopted a call to place Turkey back under monitoring due to setbacks in democracy, human rights, the rule of law, freedom of expression, and judicial independence. Turkey last officially exited the monitoring process in 2004 when it began accession negotiations with the European Union.
- April 27 – The 2017 storming of the Macedonian Parliament occurs.

=== May ===
- May 7 – 2017 French presidential election: Emmanuel Macron of En Marche! wins the second round of the French presidential election decisively, defeating Marine Le Pen of the National Front (FN).
- May 9–13 – The Eurovision Song Contest takes place in Kyiv, Ukraine, and is won by Portuguese entrant Salvador Sobral with the song "Amar Pelos Dois".
- May 12 – WannaCry ransomware attack: Computers around the world are hit by a large-scale ransomware cyberattack, which goes on to affect at least 150 countries.
- May 22 – An ISIL terrorist bombing attack at an Ariana Grande concert in Manchester, England, kills 22 people and injures more than 500 others.

=== June ===
- June 1 – Amidst widespread criticism, the U.S. government announces its decision to withdraw from the Paris Climate Agreement in due time.
- June 3
  - London Bridge attack: Eight people are murdered and dozens of civilians are wounded by Islamist terrorists. Three of the attackers are shot dead by the police. ISIS claims responsibility for the attack.
  - 2017 Turin stampede: During a screening of the 2017 UEFA Champions League Final, pepper spray is discharged by individuals attempting to rob soccer fans in the square, causing the crowd to panic. There are 3 deaths and 1,672 people wounded.
- June 5
  - Montenegro joins NATO as the 29th member.
  - The Qatar diplomatic crisis of 2017–18 starts, as Saudi Arabia, Bahrain, the United Arab Emirates and other Arab countries block Qatari access to their seas and air.
- June 7 – Two terrorist attacks are simultaneously carried out by five Islamic State (ISIL) terrorists against the Iranian Parliament building and the Mausoleum of Ruhollah Khomeini, both in Tehran, leaving 17 civilians dead and 43 more wounded.
- June 8 – A snap general election is held in the United Kingdom, three years before the next was due, resulting in a hung parliament, with the Conservative Party, led by Prime Minister Theresa May, losing their majority in Parliament. The Labour Party, led by Jeremy Corbyn, makes gains for the first time since 1997. Days later, the Conservative Party, now lacking a majority, enters a confidence-and-supply deal with the Northern Ireland loyalist party DUP.
- June 10 – The 2017 World Expo is opened in Astana, Kazakhstan.
- June 14 – The Grenfell Tower Fire in West London claims the lives of 72 residents, making it the worst UK residential fire since World War II.
- June 18 – Iran's Islamic Revolution Guards Corps (IRGC) fire six surface-to-surface mid-range ballistic missiles from domestic bases targeting ISIL forces in the Syrian Deir ez-Zor Governorate in response to the terrorist attacks in Tehran earlier this month.
- June 21 – The Great Mosque of al-Nuri in Mosul, Iraq, is destroyed by ISIL.
- June 22 – The African and Caribbean War Memorial unveiled in Brixton, London.
- June 24 – The Goodwin Fire, a wildfire, starts in Yavapai County, Arizona near Mayer and forces evacuations of more than a hundred people.
- June 25 – The World Health Organization estimates that the 2016–17 Yemen cholera outbreak has over 200,000 cases.
- June 26 – The 2017 America's Cup yacht race, sailed in Bermuda, is won by New Zealand's Aotearoa.
- June 27 – 2017 cyberattacks on Ukraine: A series of cyberattacks using the Petya malware begins, affecting organizations in Ukraine.

=== July ===
- July 4 – Russia and China urge North Korea to halt its missile and nuclear programs after it successfully tested its first intercontinental ballistic missile.
- July 7
  - The Treaty on the Prohibition of Nuclear Weapons is voted for by 122 states.
  - ISIL affiliated insurgents attacked an Egyptian military checkpoint in Northern Sinai's Rafah which resulted in the deaths of 26 Egyptian personnel including colonel Ahmed Mansi and 44 other insurgents.
- July 10 – Iraqi Civil War: Mosul is declared fully liberated from the Islamic State of Iraq and the Levant.

=== August ===
- August 5
  - The UN Security Council unanimously approves fresh sanctions on North Korean trade and investment.
  - Mauritania holds a constitutional referendum for approval of proposed amendments to the constitution.
- August 12 – The Unite the Right rally is held in Charlottesville, Virginia, United States, by a variety of white nationalist and other far-right groups; Heather Heyer, a counter-protester, is killed after being hit by a car.
- August 17
  - The first observation of a collision of two neutron stars (GW170817) is hailed as a breakthrough in multi-messenger astronomy when both gravitational and electromagnetic waves from the event are detected. Data from the event provided confirmatory evidence for the r-process theory of the origin of heavy elements like gold.
  - 2017 Barcelona attacks: 22-year-old Younes Abouyaaqoub drives a van into pedestrians on La Rambla in Barcelona, killing 13 people and injuring at least 130 others.
- August 18 – The first terrorist attack ever sentenced as a crime in Finland kills two people and injures eight others. Islamic terrorist Abderrahman Bouanane, a Moroccan man carried out the ISIS-inspired attack in southwest Finland.
- August 21 – A total solar eclipse (nicknamed "The Great American Eclipse") is visible within a band across the entire contiguous United States of America, passing from the Pacific to the Atlantic coasts. The moon was just 3 days past perigee, making it relatively large.
- August 25–ongoing – A military operation targeting Rohingya Muslims in Myanmar "seems a textbook example of ethnic cleansing", according to the United Nations High Commissioner for Human Rights.
- August 25–30 – Hurricane Harvey strikes the United States as a Category 4 hurricane, causing catastrophic damage to the Houston metropolitan area, mostly due to record-breaking floods. At least 108 deaths are recorded, and total damage reaches $125 billion (2017 USD), making Harvey the costliest natural disaster in United States history, tied with Hurricane Katrina in 2005.

=== September ===
- September 1 – Russian President Vladimir Putin expels 755 diplomats in response to United States sanctions.
- United States Passports become invalid to travel to North Korea, in response to the death of Otto Warmbier.
- September 3 – North Korea conducts its sixth and most powerful nuclear test.
- September 6 – Hurricane Irma, at peak intensity, would make the first of many powerful landfalls along the Caribbean islands and the United States. Damages would total $77.2 billion (2017 USD), and 134 would be killed by the storm.
- September 13 – The International Olympic Committee awards Paris and Los Angeles the right to host the 2024 and 2028 Summer Olympics, respectively.
- September 15 – Cassini–Huygens ends its 13-year mission by plunging into Saturn, becoming the first spacecraft to enter the planet's atmosphere.
- September 19 – Twelve days after another powerful earthquake, and on the 32nd anniversary of the deadly 1985 Mexico City earthquake, a 7.1 M_{w} earthquake strikes central Mexico, killing 370, leaving up to 6,000 injured and thousands more homeless.
- September 19–20 – Just two weeks after Hurricane Irma struck the Caribbean, Hurricane Maria strikes similar areas, making landfall on Dominica as a Category 5 hurricane, and Puerto Rico as a Category 4 hurricane. Maria caused over 3,000 deaths and damages estimated in excess of $91.6 billion (2017 USD).
- September 25 – The Kurdistan Region votes in a referendum to become an independent state, in defiance of Iraq; by October 15, the crisis escalates into a short-lived armed conflict over disputed territories.
- September 26 – Fortnite Battle Royale releases, becoming one of the biggest video games in the world and a cultural phenomenon.

=== October ===
- October 1 – 60 people are killed and 867 more injured when Stephen Paddock opens fire on a crowd in Las Vegas, surpassing the 2016 Orlando nightclub shooting as the deadliest mass shooting perpetrated by a lone gunman in U.S. history.
- October 12 – The United States announces its decision to withdraw from UNESCO, and is immediately followed by Israel.
- October 14 – A massive blast caused by a truck bombing in Mogadishu, Somalia kills at least 587 people and injures 316 others.
- October 16 - Maltese investigative journalist and blogger Daphne Caruana Galizia is killed by a car bomb outside her home in Bidnija.
- October 17 – Syrian Civil War: Raqqa is declared fully liberated from the Islamic State of Iraq and the Levant.
- October 25 – At the 19th National Congress of the Chinese Communist Party, Xi Jinping assumes his second term as General Secretary (China's paramount leader), and the political theory Xi Jinping Thought is written into the party's constitution.
- October 26 – At the level crossing of the Hanko–Hyvinkää railway line, a passenger train collided with an off-road truck of the Nyland Brigade in Raseborg, Finland; four people died and 11 were injured.
- October 27 – Based on the results of a previously held referendum, Catalonia declares independence from Spain, but the Catalan Republic is not recognised by the Spanish government or any other sovereign nation.

=== November ===
- November 2 – A new species of orangutan is identified in Indonesia, becoming the third known species of orangutan as well as the first great ape to be described for almost a century.
- November 3 – Syrian Civil War: both Deir ez-Zor in Syria and Al-Qa'im in Iraq are declared liberated from ISIL on the same day.
- November 5
  - The German newspaper Süddeutsche Zeitung publishes 13.4 million documents leaked from the offshore law firm Appleby, along with business registries in 19 tax jurisdictions that reveal offshore financial activities on behalf of politicians, celebrities, corporate giants and business leaders. The newspaper shared the documents with the International Consortium of Investigative Journalists and asked it to lead the investigation.
  - Sutherland Springs church shooting: A gunman opens fire in a Baptist church in Sutherland Springs, Texas, United States, killing 26 people and injuring 20 more. It was the deadliest shooting in an American place of worship in modern history, surpassing the Charleston church shooting of 2015 and the Waddell Buddhist temple shooting of 1991.
- November 12 – A magnitude 7.3 earthquake strikes the border region between Iraq and Iran leaving at least 530 dead and over 70,000 homeless.
- November 15
  - Zimbabwean President Robert Mugabe is placed under house arrest, as the military take control of the country. He resigns six days later, after 37 years of rule.
  - A Leonardo da Vinci painting, Salvator Mundi, sells for US$450 million at Christie's in New York, a new record price for any work of art.
  - The Argentinian submarine ARA San Juan suddenly vanished with 44 crew members on board whilst on a routine patrol in the South Atlantic. It would be found one year later wrecked 907 metres (2,976 ft) below the Atlantic Ocean.
- November 20 – Nature publishes an article recognising the high-velocity asteroid ʻOumuamua as originating from outside the Solar System, i.e. the first known interstellar object.
- November 22 – The International Court of Justice finds Ratko Mladić guilty of genocide committed in Srebrenica during the 1990s Bosnian War, the worst massacre in Europe since World War II. He is sentenced to life in prison.
- November 24 – A mosque attack in Sinai, Egypt kills 305 worshippers and leaves hundreds more wounded.
- November 27 – Start of the Honduran protests.

=== December ===
- December 5 – Russia is banned from the 2018 Winter Olympics in Pyeongchang by the International Olympic Committee, following an investigation into state-sponsored doping.
- December 6 – The United States officially recognizes Jerusalem as Israel's capital.
- December 9 – The Iraqi military announces that it has "fully liberated" all of Iraq's territory from "ISIS terrorist gangs" and retaken full control of the Iraqi-Syrian border.
- December 14 – The Walt Disney Company announces that it will acquire most of 21st Century Fox, including the 20th Century Fox film studio, for $66 billion.
- December 22 – The UN Security Council votes 15–0 in favor of additional sanctions on North Korea, including measures to slash the country's petroleum imports by up to 90%.
- December 24 – Guatemala follows in the footsteps of the United States by announcing that they will also move their Israeli embassy to Jerusalem, followed by Honduras and Panama two days later.

== Nobel Prizes ==
Nobel medal

- Chemistry – Jacques Dubochet, Joachim Frank and Richard Henderson
- Economics – Richard Thaler
- Literature – Sir Kazuo Ishiguro
- Peace – International Campaign to Abolish Nuclear Weapons
- Physics – Barry Barish, Kip Thorne and Rainer Weiss
- Physiology or Medicine – Jeffrey C. Hall, Michael Rosbash and Michael W. Young

== See also ==
- List of International observances § Years
