= St Mary's Church, Full Sutton =

Church in Full Sutton, East Riding of Yorkshire, England

Coordinates: 53°59′23″N 0°51′41″W

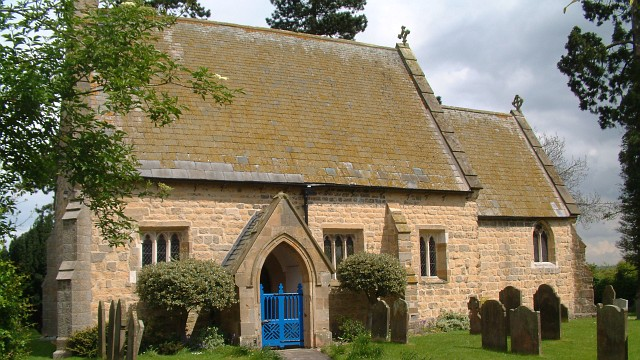
The church, in 2005

St Mary's Church is the parish church of Full Sutton, a village in the East Riding of Yorkshire, in England.

A chapel of ease to All Saints' Church, Catton existed in Full Sutton in the 13th century, when it was given its own parish. It was repaired in the 1610s, and between 1723 and 1724 the porch was repaired and one buttress was rebuilt. Between 1844 and 1845, the church was rebuilt to a design by George Townsend Andrews, reusing much of the old masonry.

The church was designed by G. T. Andrews, and rebuilt re-using much old masonry. It is in stone and has a slate roof with raised coped gables. The church consists of a nave, a south porch, and a chancel with a north vestry. On the west gable is a gabled bellcote with two pointed arches under a vesica. Inside, the Victorian pews survive.

== See also ==
- Listed buildings in Full Sutton
