= Steven Grieveson =

British serial killer

- Born: Steven John Grieveson; 14 December 1970 (age 55); Sunderland, County Durham, England
- Other name: The Sunderland strangler
- Conviction: Murder
- Penalty: Four life sentences (min. 35 years)

Details
- Victims: 4+
- Span of crimes: 26 May 1990 – 25 February 1994
- Country: England
- Date apprehended: 11 March 1994
- Imprisoned at: HMP Full Sutton

Steven John Grieveson (born 14 December 1970) is a British serial killer known as the Sunderland Strangler, who murdered four teenage boys in a series of killings committed between 1990 and 1994 in Sunderland, England. Convicted of three counts of murder at Leeds Crown Court, Grieveson was handed three life sentences on 28 February 1996, with a recommendation that he serve a minimum of 35 years before the Home Secretary considers his eligibility for release.

In October 2013, Grieveson was convicted of the 1990 murder of 14-year-old Simon Martin at Newcastle Crown Court and handed a fourth life sentence. He is incarcerated at HMP Full Sutton in the East Riding of Yorkshire, England.

Grieveson became known as the Sunderland Strangler due to the city in which he committed his murders, and his preferred murder method of ligature strangulation.

== Murders and trial ==
On 26 November 1993, Grieveson murdered 18-year-old Thomas Kelly in an abandoned allotment shed in Fulwell, Sunderland. His body was set on fire. On 4 February 1994, he murdered 15-year-old David Hanson in Roker Terrace, before finally murdering 15-year-old David Grieff on 25 February 1994 in an abandoned Fulwell allotment just 50 yards from where he had killed Thomas Kelly three months earlier. All three victims were pupils or former pupils of Monkwearmouth Academy, and suspicion among both law enforcement and the staff and fellow pupils at this school was that all three victims had known their killer—who may have been a present or former student of Monkwearmouth Academy himself. Grieveson was a pupil primarily at Hylton Red House School.

Grieveson was initially arrested on 11 March, charged with an attempted burglary at the Roker Terrace household where the charred body of David Hanson had previously been found. Following an extensive investigation, Grieveson was charged with the three murders in November 1995, and faced a six-week trial in 1996 where he was handed three life sentences for murder. He was ordered to serve a minimum of 35 years in prison.

"You murdered Thomas Kelly after finding an efficient and effective way to kill him and conceal the evidence, by setting fire to his body ... and so far from being appalled at what you had done, when the opportunity arose to repeat the experience, you did it again. It could well be that one reason—perhaps the only reason—was that you liked killing. By that stage you were plainly evil, and even more plainly dangerous. Mercifully, you were soon in custody and the killings stopped."

— Mr Justice Holland pronouncing sentence upon Steven Grieveson. 28 February 1996.

It was ascertained at this first trial, held at Leeds Crown Court, that Grieveson murdered the three boys in order to conceal evidence of his homosexuality. When asked their personal feelings towards Steven Grieveson following his conviction, the father of Thomas Kelly stated: "[It is] a great relief this monster is off the streets so no other family will have to go through what we faced."

=== Fourth murder conviction ===
In November 2000, Grieveson, serving his three life sentences at Full Sutton Prison, was arrested and questioned over the May 1990 murder of 14-year-old Simon Martin, who was murdered in Gilside House, Roker.

In June 2004, Grieveson wrote a letter to the Victim Liaison Services in which he admitted murdering the three victims killed in 1993 and 1994, but in which he omitted his culpability in the murder of Simon Martin. As such, he was not charged with Martin's murder at the time. On 22 November 2012, however, Grieveson was charged with the murder of Simon Martin, and on 11 February 2013, he admitted being responsible for Martin's death, but denied that this particular murder had been premeditated. He was convicted of Simon Martin's murder on 24 October 2013 following a trial at Newcastle Crown Court.

== Discounted link to other murder ==
On 20 February 2014, Grieveson was also arrested on suspicion of the 1992 murder of a seven-year-old girl named Nikki Allan, who had been found stabbed to death in a disused warehouse in October 1992. Two years after her death a neighbour, who had confessed to the killing, was acquitted after police were found to have used "oppressive methods" in their questioning. Although Allan was female and had been stabbed to death, the extensive blunt force trauma injuries inflicted to her head had been similar to those Grieveson had inflicted on Simon Martin in 1990. Grieveson was questioned as to his potential involvement, although detectives later stated he was to face no further current action in relation to their ongoing enquiries into Allan's murder.

In 2017, police announced they had isolated a complete DNA profile of Allan's murderer from previous samples, leading to the re-arrest in 2019 of a previous suspect (not Grieveson).

In May 2023, 55-year-old David Boyd was found guilty of Allan's murder. Boyd was a convicted child molester; his partner in the early 1990s had been Allan's babysitter.

== See also ==
- Child sexual abuse
- Crime in the United Kingdom
- List of serial killers in the United Kingdom
- List of serial killers by number of victims

== Cited works and further reading ==
- Baker, Jeanette (1996). Triple Horror in Sunderland. Master Detective. December 1996 issue. ISSN 0262-4141
- Hall, Steve; Winlow, Simon (2012). New Directions in Criminological Theory. Routledge. pp. 230–231. ISBN 978-1-843-92913-0
