= Murder of Bernadette Walker =

2020 murder in Peterborough, England

- Undated photo of Bernadette Walker
- Skaters Way, Peterborough, the place where Scott falsely said Bernadette got out of the car and ran away.
- Location: 52.62075°N 0.26974°W; Skaters Way, Peterborough, Cambridgeshire, England
- Date: 18 July 2020
- Attack type: Child murder, child abuse
- Victim: Bernadette Walker
- Perpetrator: Scott Walker
- Motive: End Bernadette's allegations of sexual abuse
- Charges: Scott Walker: Murder; Perverting the course of justice; Sarah Walker: Perverting the course of justice
- Sentence: Scott Walker: Life imprisonment with a minimum term of 32 years; Sarah Walker: 6 years of prison

On 18 July 2020, 17-year-old Bernadette Walker disappeared in Peterborough, Cambridgeshire, England. Walker, a photography student, was last seen at her grandparents' house. She is presumed dead and despite extensive searches by police, her body has not been found.

Days before her disappearance, Bernadette made allegations to her mother, Sarah Walker, that her stepfather Scott Walker had been sexually abusing her for several years. Scott was arrested for her murder and perverting the course of justice, despite the absence of Bernadette's body. Prosecutors said that Scott killed Bernadette to "prevent her pursuing her allegations of sexual abuse any further".

Scott Walker was found guilty at Cambridge Crown Court in July 2021, and was sentenced to life in prison in September. Sarah was found guilty of perverting the course of justice and sentenced to 6 years. Scott died from cancer at HM Prison Full Sutton on 22 December 2023, without revealing the location of Bernadette's body.

== Disappearance ==
Bernadette Walker (born 24 July 2002) was a photography student at Peterborough College. She was last seen on 18 July 2020, when her stepfather Scott picked her up in a car from his parents' home in Peterborough, where she had spent the night.

Scott's phone was then turned off between 11:23 a.m. and 12:54 p.m., during which time he claimed Bernadette got out of the car and ran away in Skaters Way. Prosecutors said it was during these 91 minutes Scott murdered Bernadette.

== Investigation ==
Scott and Sarah reported her disappearance on 21 July. Scott shared a missing poster of Bernadette on Facebook on 8 September. The police teams conducted exhaustive searches in Gunthorpe, Newborough, and other parts of Peterborough and Cambridgeshire.

Cambridgeshire Constabulary discovered that instead of picking her up that morning, Scott had gone to a lock-up garage owned by his parents in Walton. He visited this location several times after Bernadette was reported missing.

The police found that Scott's first call after 12:54 p.m. was to Sarah, which lasted for more than nine minutes. The police concluded that the only reason Scott called Sarah was to tell her that he had killed Bernadette and needed help. To cover up Bernadette's death, he made up the story about Bernadette getting out of the car and running away.

=== Fake messages ===
In a police interview, Sarah claimed that her daughter continued sending her messages after she disappeared. However, the messages that were sent after 18 July turned out to be sent by Sarah.

=== Scott's abuse ===
Bernadette's rucksack was found in the Walton lock-up garage and a diary was found inside. On 16 July, Bernadette wrote: “Told my mum about my dad and the abuse. She called me a liar and threatened to kill me if I told the police. What kind of parent wouldn't believe their daughter?” On 14 September 2020, Scott and Sarah were arrested for murder and perverting the course of justice. Although her body has not been found, police suspect that Bernadette is dead, strangled by Scott.

== Trial ==
Scott Walker's trial started at Cambridge Crown Court in June 2021. One of Bernadette's friends, Warren Naylor, revealed that Bernadette told him that she had been sexually abused by her stepfather over a seven-year period. He had received messages on 19 July from Bernadette's Instagram account saying that she had lied, but Warren suspected that Sarah had sent that message.

Scott refused to say the location of Bernadette's body. Judge Justice McGowan said that his refusal to reveal the location of Bernadette's body "means she can't be shown the respect she deserves". She added: "Cruellest of all, it's likely to mean some members of her family and friends will go on hoping she might be alive and might someday come back into their lives".

In November 2020, the Prisoners Disclosure of Information About Victims Act 2020, known as "Helen's Law", was passed. This law's intent is to ensure murderers and paedophiles who declined to disclose information on their victims could face longer jail sentences. This law was a factor in the length of Scott's sentence.

On 26 July 2021, the jury at Cambridge Crown Court found Scott guilty of murder; on 10 September, he was sentenced to life imprisonment. Sarah was sentenced to six years for perverting the course of justice in Bernadette's murder case.

== Aftermath ==
Police continued the search for Bernadette's body for several weeks, using dogs, diving equipment, and drones in different areas. Nothing was found. Detective Justine Jenkins said: "We may never know the truth about what Scott did and why, but we do know Bernadette had made allegations of abuse against him".

On 22 December 2023, 53-year-old Scott Walker died at HM Prison Full Sutton, having served 26 months of his life sentence, from complications related to bladder cancer that had metastasised through his body. In July 2025, the Prisons and Probation Ombudsman – which investigates all deaths in prison – released its findings that the staff at Full Sutton had failed in their duty to complete timely paperwork to allow a review as to whether Scott Walker might receive compassionate release.

== See also ==
- List of murder convictions without a body
- List of solved missing person cases (2020s)
- Murder of Helen McCourt
