= Content Guru =

UK cloud communications provider

Content Guru Ltd
- Type: Private limited Company
- Industry: Telecommunications
- Founded: 2005; 21 years ago
- Founders: Sean Taylor and Martin Taylor
- Headquarters: Bracknell, England, United Kingdom
- Area served: The company provides services in approximately 60 countries
- Products: Storm CONTACT
- Services: Cloud communications software, cloud contact centre software
- Revenue: £ 80.3 million (2025)
- Parent: Redwood Technologies Group
- Website: www.contentguru.com

Content Guru is a cloud communications provider based in Bracknell, UK. The company provides services in over 60 countries through its cloud Contact Centre, Storm. These services are provided directly to customers and with partners such as Vodafone, Cinos and Rakuten. Clients include the National Health Service and Serco.

In April 2016, Content Guru received a Queen's Award for Innovation.

== History ==
Content Guru is made up of a number of wholly owned subsidiaries of Redwood Technologies Group across North America, Asia-Pacific and Europe. The vast majority of the revenue generated by Redwood Technologies Group comes from the delivery of cloud services, provided and supported by Content Guru.

Content Guru was founded in 2005 and provides cloud-based customer engagement and customer experience services and cloud contact centre products. The company has offices in the US, Japan, Singapore, the UK, the Netherlands, Germany, Ireland and Italy.

In 2010, Storm was used by ComRes on behalf of ITV News to provide live audience polling for the first televised election leaders' debate in the build-up to the UK 2010 General Election.

In 2013, Content Guru co-founded Berkshire Community Foundation (BCF)'s Business Philanthropy Club (BPC), which enables businesses in Berkshire to provide funding for grassroots organizations and projects in their local communities. Content Guru has been a sponsor of the Pride of Bracknell Forest Awards since 2016, along with its parent company Redwood Technologies. Content Guru supports several local and national charities.

In March 2017, the company announced that it would be delivering services to the United States. In January 2018, a minority stake of Content Guru and its parent company, Redwood Technologies Group, was sold to Scottish Equity Partners in a £25 million cash deal. In February 2018, Content Guru announced a partnership with Rakuten Communications to deliver services to Japan.

In March 2018, the Kerslake Report, an independent review into the emergency response to the Manchester Arena bombing, found that the setup of the Casualty Bureau had been "seriously hampered" by the failure of the National Mutual Aid Telephony system provided by Vodafone. The report stated that problems with a fallback solution, including the inability to amend a recorded message and technical difficulties with a server, suggested "an inadequate level of knowledge or expertise within Vodafone or its sub-contractor Content Guru".

In June 2019, Redwood Technologies Group acquired Weston Digital Technologies for its screen recording and quality monitoring functionality. In early July 2020 Content Guru announced that its product could integrate with Microsoft Teams. In July 2020, Content Guru was named as a supplier in Crown Commercial Service's Spark Dynamic Purchasing System.

In April 2021, Content Guru's parent company Redwood Technologies acquired US-based Potomac Integration and Consulting (PIC).
