= Listed buildings in Full Sutton =

Full Sutton is a civil parish in the county of the East Riding of Yorkshire, England. It contains two listed buildings that are recorded in the National Heritage List for England. Both the listed buildings are designated at Grade II, the lowest of the three grades, which is applied to "buildings of national importance and special interest". The parish contains the village of Full Sutton and the surrounding countryside, and the listed buildings consist of a house and a church.

== Buildings ==
Name and location	Photograph	Date	Notes
Full Sutton Grange; 53.99214°N 0.86702°W	—	Mid to late 18th century	The house is in colourwashed red brick, with a floor band, and a pantile roof with tumbled-in brick to the raised gables. There are two storeys and three bays. The central doorway has a fanlight, and the windows are sashes.
St Mary's Church; 53.98987°N 0.86141°W		1844–45	The church was designed by G. T. Andrews, and rebuilt re-using much old masonry. It is in stone and has a slate roof with raised coped gables. The church consists of a nave, a south porch, and a chancel with a north vestry. On the west gable is a gabled bellcote with two pointed arches under a vesica.
