= Didsbury Mosque =

Mosque in Manchester, England

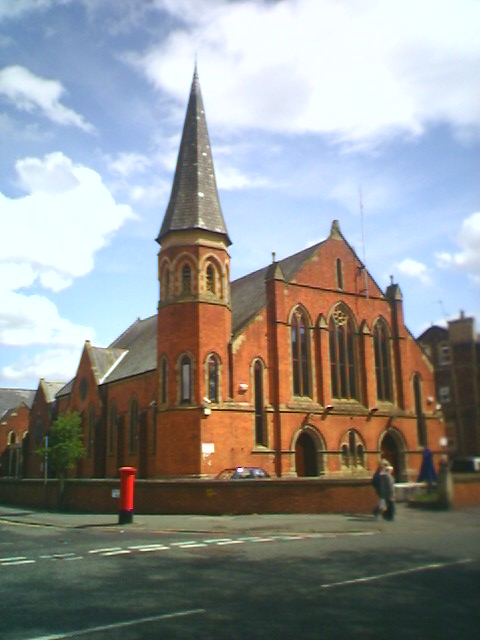
- View from the intersection of Barlow Moor Road & Burton Road

Religion
- Affiliation: Salafi/Ikhwan
- District: Didsbury
- Leadership: Sheikh Mustafa Abdullah Graf

Location
- Location: 271 Burton Road, Didsbury, Manchester, England
- Interactive map of Didsbury Mosque
- Coordinates: 53°25′22″N 2°14′49″W

Architecture
- Type: Chapel
- Completed: 1883 / 1965

Specifications
- Capacity: 950 (including women)
- Dome: 0
- Minaret: 1

Website
- http://www.didsburymosque.com/

Didsbury Mosque is on Burton Road in Didsbury, Manchester, England. The building was originally Albert Park Methodist Chapel, which opened in 1883, but closed in 1962 and was later converted into a mosque. It has an attendance of around 1,000 people. The mosque Sheikh is Mustafa Abdullah Graf.

== Distinctive aspects ==
The Didsbury Mosque and Manchester Islamic Centre says that it "represents a wide range of the Muslim community of various origins and/or Islamic schools of thought". The mosque holds open-days with displays, talks, question-and-answer sessions, and guided tours.

Didsbury Mosque has a gardening volunteering group for maintaining their paradise themed garden on Burton Road containing roses, sweet peas, Mediterranean plants, salad garden with pergolas. A Youth group has also been set up encouraging them to play table tennis, badminton, chess and others along with food, Islamic reminders and prayers.

The mosque has a Sharia (Islamic law) Department which issues fatwas (Islamic decrees), oversees family affairs, helps calculate zakat (a type of alms-giving), and provides advice and mediation with regard to financial transactions.

With radio coverage of most of South Manchester, the mosque broadcasts adhan (Islamic call to prayer), prayers themselves, Friday sermons, and daily reminders, as well as talks and lectures given in the prayer hall of the mosque. The Manchester Islamic Centre is registered as a charity with the Charity Commission.

During the 2021 COVID-19 lockdown they offered hot food and a foodbank for their neighbours and those in need as well as briefly holding a pop-up vaccine centre. On 21 January 2021 an emergency flood warning given to many Didsbury residents encouraged them to evacuate. In response, the Mosque provided voluntary emergency overnight stay for residents including the Didsbury West councillor.

== Attendees ==
There are strong Libyan ties within the mosque, with various people from the mosque having been involved, in Libya, in the civil war. In 2011, the (current) mosque imam travelled to Libya, where he aided moderate rebel groups to help topple Gaddafi. Another person from the mosque was described variously as a "member" and a "senior member" of the Libyan Islamic Fighting Group. A regular worshipper at the mosque, Abd al-Baset Azzouz, al Qaeda operative left Britain in 2009 to join the terror group’s leader Ayman al-Zawahiri in Pakistan, before heading to Libya to run an al Qaeda network in the east of the country.

At least two British recruits of Islamic State also worshipped at the mosque. Rapper and ISIS soldier Raphael Hostey worshipped at the mosque together with Salman Abedi, who went on to set off a suicide bomb at Manchester Arena in 2017. Hostey travelled to Syria where he was killed.

In December 2017, mosque attendee Mohammed Abdallah, was jailed for 10 years for being a member of Islamic State, where he was listed as a "specialist sniper".

== Link to Manchester Arena bombing ==
The perpetrator of the Manchester Arena bombing was identified as Salman Ramadan Abedi, an attendant of the mosque. His father, Ramadan Abedi (also known as Abu Ismael), called the adhan at the mosque; his older brother, Ismail Abedi, was a tutor in the mosque's Qur'an school. Both men were arrested.

The mosque released a statement condemning the terror attack. The mosque also held a moment of silence to remember the victims of the bombing.

Muslims opposed to militant Islamic ideologies, cited by the Voice of America, have said that the mosque must bear some responsibility for Abedi's radicalisation because of the conservative Salafi brand of Islam it allegedly espouses. Rashad Ali, senior fellow at the Institute for Strategic Dialogue and counter-terror expert, told Vice News the mosque preached a "fairly radical, puritan" brand of Salafist Islam and was "effectively taken over at certain points by various Libyan militia groups, including ones associated with the Muslim Brotherhood." He said the Abedi family subscribed to a radical political strain of Salafism, a background which suggested the bomber would have had a shorter pathway to radicalisation than others. According to a secret recording unveiled by the BBC, 10 days before the Abedi bought his concert ticket, Mostafa Graf, the imam of the Didsbury Mosque, made a call for armed jihad, according to scholars. An investigation by Greater Manchester Police into the report found that no offences had been committed.

One attendee said in 2017 that allegedly, "every other Friday khutba [sermon] at Didsbury was about how bad ISIS are" and that the bomber allegedly, "hated the mosque", whereas another attendee said Salman Abedi "learned the Qur’an by heart" at the mosque. On 4 November 2017 the mosque was put on lockdown after receiving a "threatening letter".

== 2021 Arson ==
On 10 and 11 September 2021 an arson attack caused minor damage to a door. Passersby helped put the fire out. Police have CCTV footage and are investigating, they are asking for help from anyone with dashcam footage or other information that may help in their enquiries. Police stated, "We believe there were several vehicles that may have driven past at the time and would ask anyone who may have any dashcam footage to get in touch." and asked witnesses to call 0161 856 4973 or 0800 555 111 anonymously. Furthermore it was also revealed that they had received threats to destroy the mosque for a period before the arson.

== 2025 Sharia Law Advertisement ==
On 24 July 2025, an advertisement was posted in the government's Find A Job portal, for a job labelled "Sharia Law Administrator", sparking backlash from right-wing MP's affiliated with the Reform UK party, and Conservative Party (UK).

Posts made by MP's such as Nigel Farage claimed that the country was being 'destroyed'. He said: "Our country and its values are being destroyed," in a post on X. Rupert Lowe, then an independent MP, posted: "I've formally questioned the DWP on what the hell they are playing at... We live in Britain - we do NOT have, or want, Shariah law."

The mosque released a statement on the events saying individuals on the 'far-right' had 'maliciously misinformed the public to incite hate and for political gain or out of ignorance' following the publication of the ad, by the Manchester Islamic Centre (MIC). The mosque had advertised for the role within its religious service and it was not a government-funded post, but rather had a salary paid for by the mosque from community donations. The job was posted by the independently registered charity - not affiliated with the Government.

== See also ==
- Islam in the United Kingdom
- Islamic schools and branches
- List of mosques
- List of mosques in the United Kingdom
