= RAF Full Sutton =

Royal Air Force base in Yorkshire, England

RAF Full Sutton
- Full Sutton, East Riding of Yorkshire in England

Site information
- Type: Royal Air Force station
- Owner: Ministry of Defence
- Operator: Royal Air Force
- Controlled by: RAF Bomber Command

Location
- Shown within East Riding of Yorkshire RAF Full Sutton (the United Kingdom)
- Coordinates: 53°58′47″N 000°51′53″W

Site history
- Built: 1943/44
- In use: May 1944 - April 1963
- Battles/wars: European theatre of World War II

Airfield information
- Elevation: 16 metres (52 ft) AMSL
Runways
Direction	Length and surface
00/00	1,810 metres (5,938 ft) Asphalt
00/00	1,600 metres (5,249 ft) Asphalt
00/00	1,200 metres (3,937 ft) Asphalt

Royal Air Force Full Sutton or RAF Full Sutton is a former Royal Air Force station located 2 miles (3.2 km) south east of Stamford Bridge, East Riding of Yorkshire and 4.7 miles (7.6 km) north west of Pocklington, East Riding of Yorkshire, England. The base did not open until May 1944, and so was the last airfield built for RAF Bomber Command.

== History ==
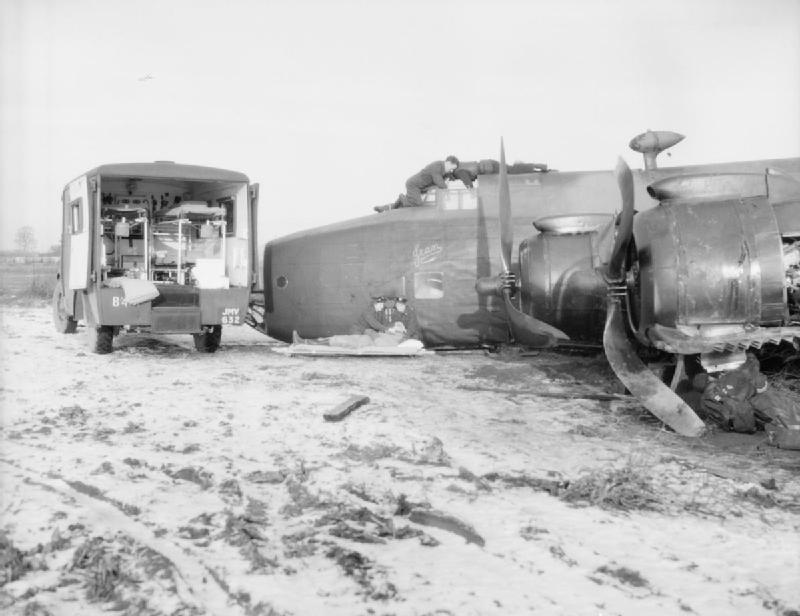
WAAF exercise on Full Sutton Airfield in January 1945 using a crashed Halifax III aircraft

The airfield opened in 1944 under No. 4 Group, as part of RAF Bomber Command, with No. 77 Squadron RAF arriving at RAF Full Sutton on 15 May 1944 with the Handley Page Halifax Mks III and VI. The base was the last operational airfield constructed for Bomber Command in the Second World War. The base was laid out in the standard design of a heavy bomber station, having three runways in an 'A' shape. The longest was 5,940 feet (1,810 m) long, the second was 5,100 feet (1,600 m), and the shortest was 3,900 feet (1,200 m). The runways, which crossed in an almost perfect triangular pattern, were laid down with different lengths to a standard heavy bomber base design. The non-standard runway distance has been put down to the land boundaries of the base. To the south-west side of the airfield, was a railway line connecting York to Beverley.

No. 77 Sqn switched to the Douglas Dakota aircraft in July 1945, then the squadron moved to RAF Broadwell on at the end of August 1945. RAF Full Sutton was switched to RAF Transport Command being used by a flight of No. 231 Squadron RAF between 1 December 1945 and 15 January 1946 operating the Avro Lancastrian C.2 before being disbanded.

In the 1950s it was part of RAF Flying Training Command, as No. 103 Flying Refresher School RAF was here between May and November 1951 which became No. 207 Advanced Flying School RAF, which was here between November 1951 and June 1954, this unit then became No. 207 Flying Training School RAF and was here between June and July 1954 when the unit was disbanded. These schools held training on Gloster Meteor aircraft as a response to the Korean War. One of the aircraft, WF831, crashed onto the railway line in 1952 just as a goods train was passing.

The airfield was then placed on care and maintenance until 1959 when No. 102 Squadron RAF arrived and the airfield was re-modelled as a PGM-17 Thor missile site, operating until 27 April 1963.

The area is now used as the civilian Full Sutton Airfield, being home to the Full Sutton Flying Centre, and another part of the site houses HMP Full Sutton, which opened in April 1988.
