= Full Sutton Circuit =

Motorsport venue at RAF Full Sutton, Yorkshire

Coordinates: 53°58′47″N 000°51′53″W

Full Sutton
- Location: Yorkshire, England
- Opened: 1958
- Closed: 1958
- Length: 3.2 miles

Full Sutton Circuit is a former motorsport venue operated at RAF Full Sutton in Yorkshire, England. RAF Full Sutton was still in use as an operational Royal Air Force station, when in 1958 permission was obtained from the Air Ministry and appears to have been organised entirely by the British Racing and Sports Car Club.

It would appear that the BRSCC organised four race meetings at the Yorkshire track. The first meeting took place in April, when it snowed, causing Jim Clark to go off in the Scott-Watson Porsche; the car narrowly missed a flag marshal who had not been warned by his fellow flag marshal of the impending danger as he departed. The meeting on 27 September saw a six-race programme for Formula III racing cars amongst others. All races were over 10 laps, with the exception of the saloon cars who raced over five laps instead, and the main event of the day, started at 16:00 with a Le Mans start and ran over 16 laps for the Sports Racing Cars of unlimited capacity. In this no less than 17 Lotus Elevens were entered, all powered by 1098cc Coventry Climax engines with the exception of Innes Ireland’s example which had a 1460cc Climax power unit.

It was the first airfield track in England to be lapped at more than 100 mph by a sports car, the car in question being a Jaguar D-type entered and owned by Border Reivers and driven by Jim Clark. The calculations in respect of the fastest lap were made in the pub after the meeting and initially showed a speed in excess of 120 mph, but when the alcohol and euphoria wore off the true figure was established. The circuit was Britain's longest at 3.2 miles (5.1 km), however the circuit was some distance from centres of population and when Rufforth Circuit became available the BRSCC moved there for convenience.
