= Full Sutton =

Village and civil parish in the East Riding of Yorkshire, England

Coordinates: 53°59′20″N 0°51′52″W

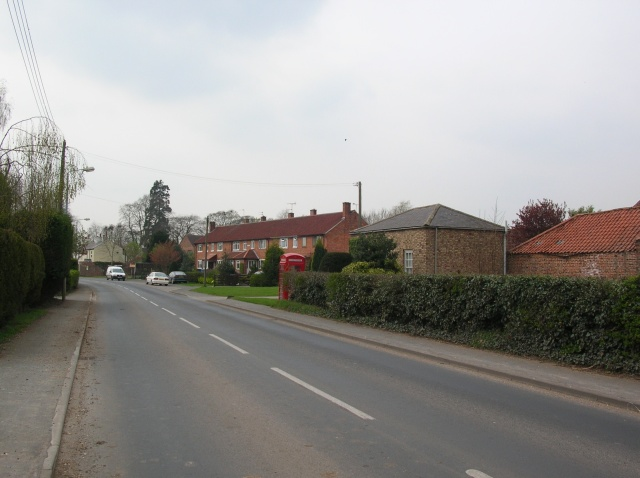
- Full Sutton

- Location within the East Riding of Yorkshire
- Population: 997
- OS grid reference: SE746554
  - London: 175 mi (282 km) S
- Civil parish: Full Sutton
- Unitary authority: East Riding of Yorkshire
- Ceremonial county: East Riding of Yorkshire
- Region: Yorkshire and the Humber
- Country: England
- Sovereign state: United Kingdom
- Post town: YORK
- Postcode district: YO41
- Dialling code: 01759
- Police: Humberside
- Fire: Humberside
- Ambulance: Yorkshire
- UK Parliament: Bridlington and The Wolds

Full Sutton is a village and civil parish in the East Riding of Yorkshire, England. It is situated approximately 2 miles (3 kilometres) east of the village of Stamford Bridge. The population according to the 2021 United Kingdom census was 997, a decrease from a figure of 1,072 in 2011.

Located at Full Sutton is a high security prison, HMP Full Sutton.

Full Sutton is also home to a former air force station, RAF Full Sutton. Opened in 1944, the station operated as a bomber airfield during the Second World War. It would later be used to maintain a number of Thor missiles in readiness as part of the UK deterrent force, before finally closing in April 1963. During 1958 the BRSCC organised four races on the airfield's runways and perimeter roads (Full Sutton Circuit). Full Sutton is now used as a general aviation airfield, with its own training facilities for the aspiring pilot.

The place was recorded in the Domesday Book as Sudtone, meaning "south settlement". The prefix, first recorded in the 13th century, means "dirty", from the Old English fūl. The Anglican parish church is St Mary's Church, Full Sutton.

== Governance ==
The parish has a joint parish council with Skirpenbeck, known as the Parish Council of Full Sutton and Skirpenbeck.

== See also ==
- Listed buildings in Full Sutton
