= HM Prison Full Sutton =

Prison in the East Riding of Yorkshire, England

Coordinates: 53°59′N 0°52′W

HMP Full Sutton
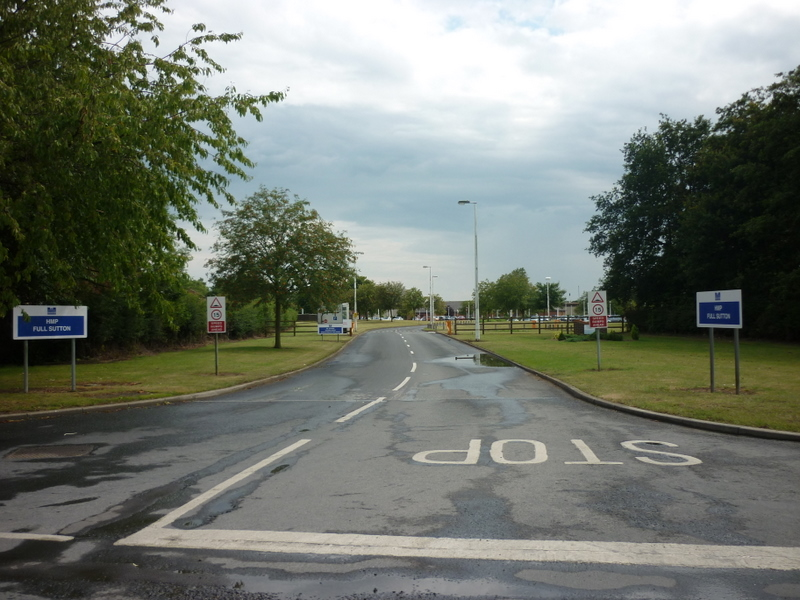
- Entrance to the prison (2011)
- Interactive map of HMP Full Sutton
- Location: Full Sutton, East Riding of Yorkshire, England
- Security class: Adult Male/Category A
- Capacity: 659 (baseline certified normal capacity)
- Population: 572 (March 2024)
- Opened: 1987
- Managed by: HM Prison Services
- Governor: Gareth Sands
- Website: Full Sutton at justice.gov.uk

HM Prison Full Sutton is a Category A and B men's prison in the village of Full Sutton, near Pocklington in the East Riding of Yorkshire, England. HMP Full Sutton is operated by His Majesty's Prison Service, and held 572 inmates in March 2024. It is a high security whose main function is to hold adult men, most of whom are deemed to pose significant risk to the public.

The prison also has a Close Supervision Centre, which is referred to as a "prison inside a prison". This is used to house prisoners who are a high risk to the public and national security. HMP Full Sutton will not normally accept prisoners who have been sentenced to less than four years, or who have less than twelve months left to serve.

== History ==
Full Sutton Prison opened in 1987 as a purpose-built maximum security prison for men.

The Home Office ordered an inquiry into Full Sutton in March 2000, after evidence emerged of racism among prison officers at the jail. The evidence centred on a log of an Asian inmate's phone conversations kept by two prison officers. The prison was in the news again in January 2003, when it emerged that inmates at Full Sutton were being paid as an incentive to learn to read and write. Payments of £1 to £3 were being made to prisoners for completing literacy and numeracy courses at the jail.

On 4 September 2005, 77-year-old conman Sidney Noble was taken hostage in his cell by fellow inmate Ian Magowan. He was tied to a chair, beaten, cut and suffered asphyxia having reportedly had his chest crushed. He died two weeks later having never regained consciousness. Magowan received a life sentence with a minimum tariff of 16 years.

A report by the Chief Inspector of Prisons in December 2005 stated that gangs inside the prison were arranging "fight clubs" to pay off debts. The level of bullying and violence was so great that many wings were unsafe. There was evidence that gangs who had been operating on the streets continued to function inside the prison using intimidation. Security concerns had led to prisoners being denied access to outside sports facilities.

In February 2006, the Independent Monitoring Board criticised Full Sutton for high levels of drug use amongst prisoners. The board stated that illegal drugs were an "insidious disease" inside the prison.

In February 2011, the convicted murderer Colin Hatch, who was jailed for the murder of seven-year-old Sean Williams in January 1994, was murdered in the prison by Damien Fowkes, an inmate who also attacked child killer Ian Huntley, who survived.

On 26 May 2013, a prison officer was taken hostage. He and a female colleague were injured; other officers successfully handled the incident.

In March 2017, it was announced that a new prison would be built adjacent to the current one. The existing prison was to stay open during the development.

In August 2018, category A inmate John Onyemaechi launched an attack on staff and began a fire in a prison wing's kitchen. Over 100 riot-trained prison officers were used to restore order and detain Onyemaechi, amounting to costs of over £15,000 in damages to the prison.

On 13 October 2019, Richard Huckle – one of Britain's most persistent convicted child sex offenders, serving twenty-two life sentences – was murdered in the prison.

== Prison buildings ==
The healthcare centre at the prison has a six-bed ward, with an additional two safer cells and a crisis suite. The centre is staffed by a full-time medical officer. Full Sutton Prison provides a range of educational courses, from Basic Skills through to Open University degree courses. Employment and training is also available in various prison workshops including, textiles, contract services, Braille transcription, catering and industrial cleaning.

The prison's gym also provides physical education with recognised qualifications, as well as recreational gym. There is a visitors' centre, with facilities including a baby-changing area, a children's play area and refreshment machines.

In September 2019 the local council passed an application for the construction of a "mega prison", with 1,440 inmates, adjacent to Full Sutton, despite nearly 3,000 objections, including one from Humberside Police. The prison, later named HM Prison Millsike after the nearby Millsike Beck, was opened in March 2025.

== Notable inmates ==
Current inmates include:

- Hashem Abedi
- David Carrick
- Steven Grieveson
- Omar Khyam
- David Mulcahy
- Darren Osborne
- Danilo Restivo

Former inmates include:

- Jeremy Bamber
- Charles Bronson
- John Cannan
- Dale Cregan
- Brian Field
- Barry Horne
- Richard Huckle
- Dennis Nilsen
- Donald Neilson
- Curtis "Cocky" Warren
- Scott Walker
- Kenneth Noye
