= The Glade of Light =

Memorial in the Medieval Quarter, Manchester

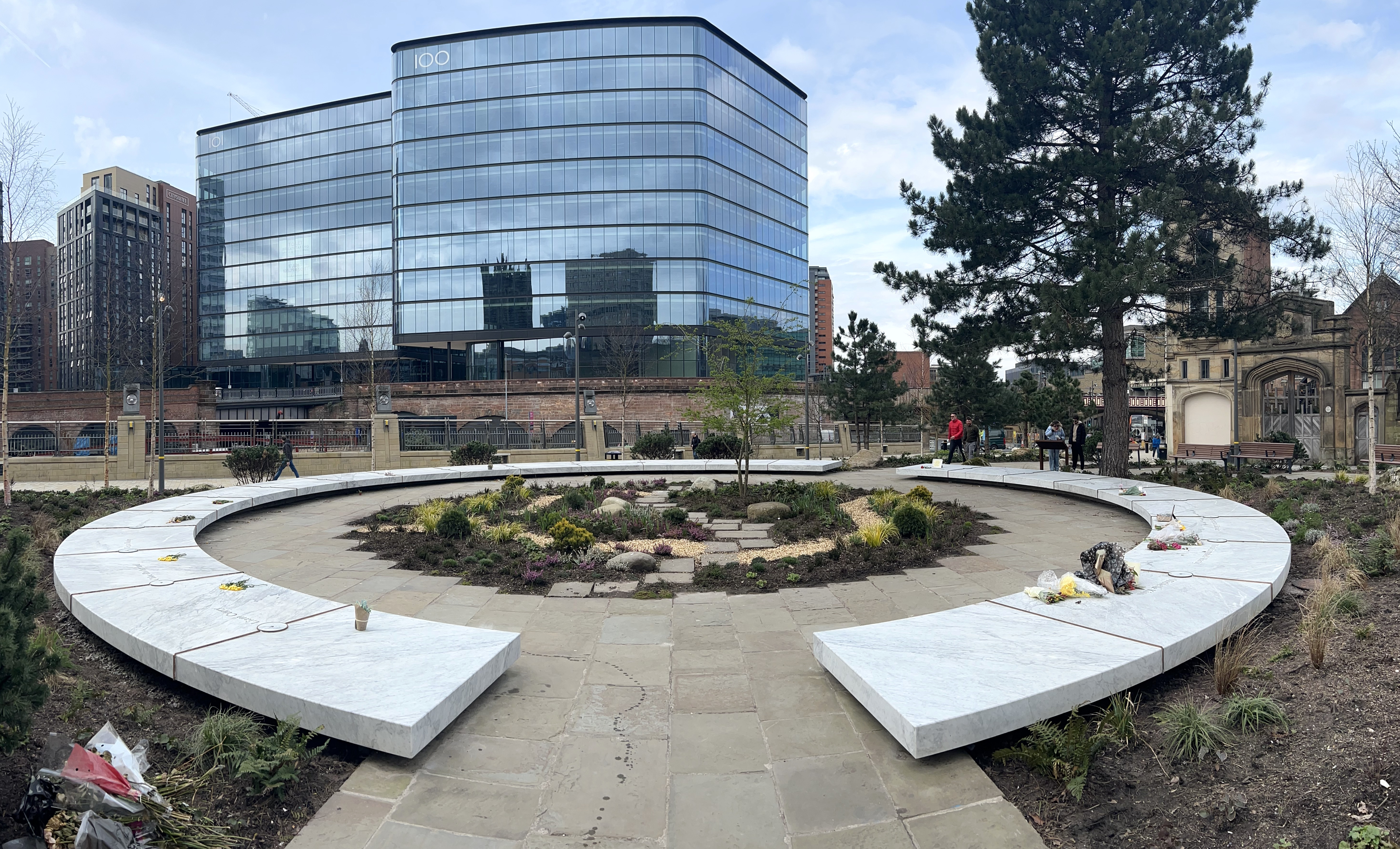
- Location: Manchester, England
- Coordinates: 53°29′09″N 2°14′41″W
- Opening date: 5 January 2022
- Dedicated to: Victims of the 2017 Manchester Arena bombing

The Glade of Light is a memorial in Manchester, England, that commemorates the victims of the Manchester Arena bombing of 2017. It opened to the public on 5 January 2022 and an official opening event took place 10 May 2022. The memorial is in the form of a garden with a stone centrepiece inscribed with the names of the 22 victims. Individual 'memory capsules' commemorating each victim have been included in the memorial and are situated within the stone centrepiece.

It was designed by landscape architects BCA Landscape and graphic designers Smiling Wolf on behalf of Galliford Try who completed the construction in 2021.

The memorial is located between Chetham's School of Music and Manchester Cathedral. It is to be part of a series of improvements to Manchester's Medieval Quarter. The former leader of Manchester City Council, Richard Leese, said that the memorial "promises to be a beautiful tribute" and the memories of the victims "will endure and Manchester will never forget them". The council had described the memorial as "a tranquil garden space for remembrance and reflection".

In December 2021, it was reported that the site for the memorial had been trespassed over after security barriers were removed. Reports of vandalism were passed to Greater Manchester Police.

The memorial was vandalised on 9 February 2022, causing £10,000 of damage. A 24-year-old man admitted to the offence in April and was given a two-year community order on 22 June 2022.
