= Manchester Arena bombing =

2017 terrorist attack in the United Kingdom

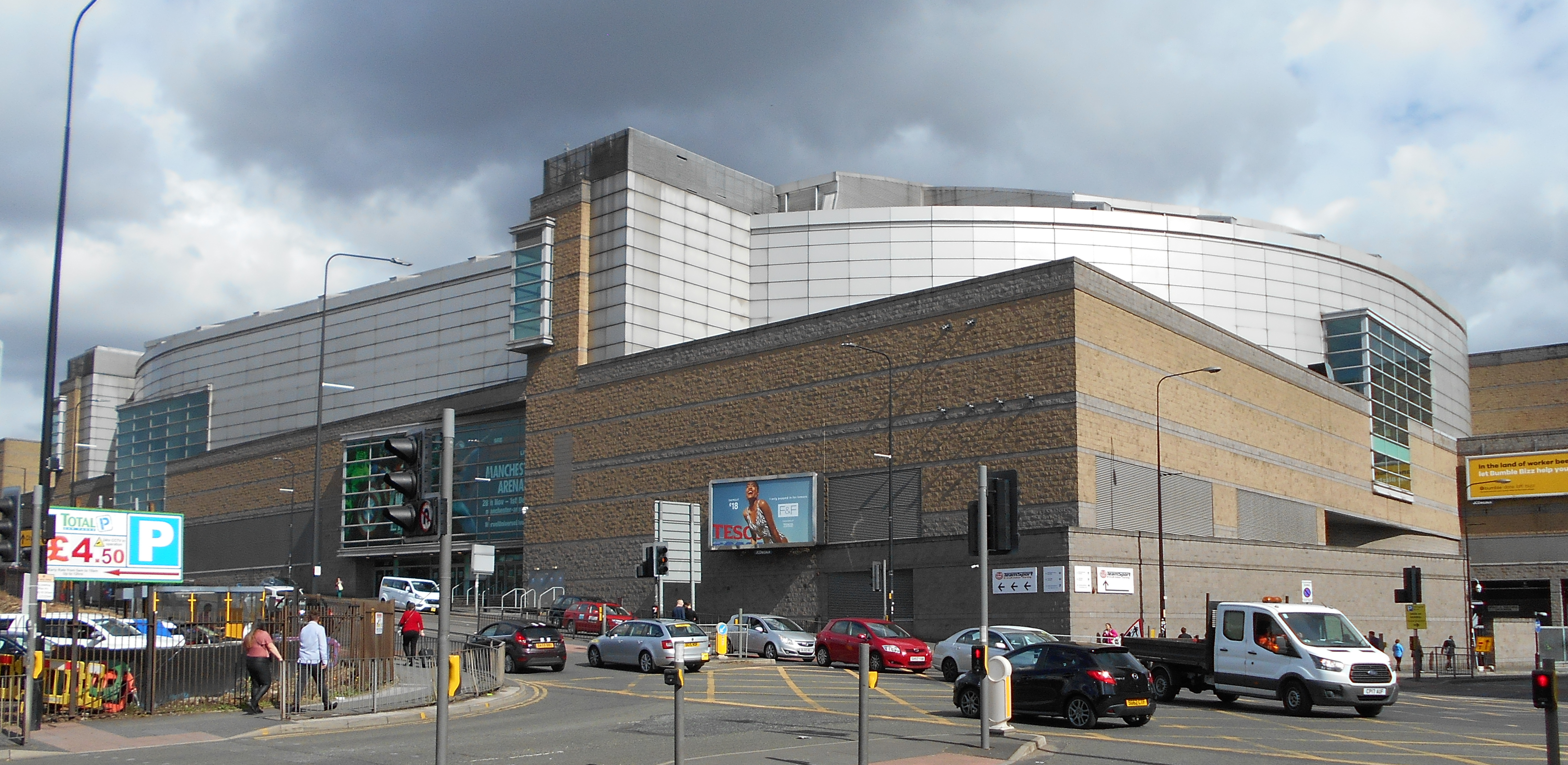
- Manchester Arena in 2019

- Manchester Arena bombing (Greater Manchester)
- Location: 53°29′17″N 2°14′38″W; Manchester Arena; Manchester, England
- Date: 22 May 2017; 9 years ago 10:31 p.m. BST (UTC+01:00)
- Target: Concertgoers
- Attack type: Islamic terrorism, suicide bombing, mass murder
- Weapon: TATP nail bomb
- Deaths: 23 (including the assailant)
- Injuries: 1,017 (Note: Including 239 physically injured, 112 hospitalised individuals, and 778 due to psychological trauma)
- Assailant: Salman Ramadan Abedi (bomber)
- Motive: Islamic extremism
- Sentence: Life imprisonment (minimum term 55 years)

On 22 May 2017, twenty-two people were killed and 1,017 injured in an Islamic terrorist suicide bombing at Manchester Arena in Manchester, England. The attack was perpetrated by Islamic extremist Salman Abedi and aided by his brother, Hashem Abedi, at 22:31 following a concert by the American pop singer Ariana Grande. It was the deadliest act of terrorism and the first suicide bombing in the United Kingdom since the 7 July 2005 London bombings.

Carrying a large backpack, Abedi detonated an improvised explosive device containing triacetone triperoxide (TATP) and nuts and bolts serving as shrapnel. After initial suspicions of a terrorist network, police later said they believed Abedi had largely acted alone, but that others had been aware of his plans. In 2020, Hashem Abedi was tried and convicted for murder, attempted murder and conspiracy, and he was sentenced to life imprisonment in August 2020 with a minimum term of 55 years, the longest ever imposed by a British court. A public inquiry released in 2021 found that 'more should have been done' by British police to stop the attack, while MI5 admitted it acted too slowly in dealing with Abedi.

Grande briefly suspended her tour and hosted a benefit concert on 4 June entitled One Love Manchester, raising a total of £17 million towards victims of the bombing. Islamophobic hate crimes increased in the Greater Manchester area following the attack, according to police. Prime Minister Theresa May formed the Commission for Countering Extremism in response to the bombing.

== Planning ==
=== Motive ===
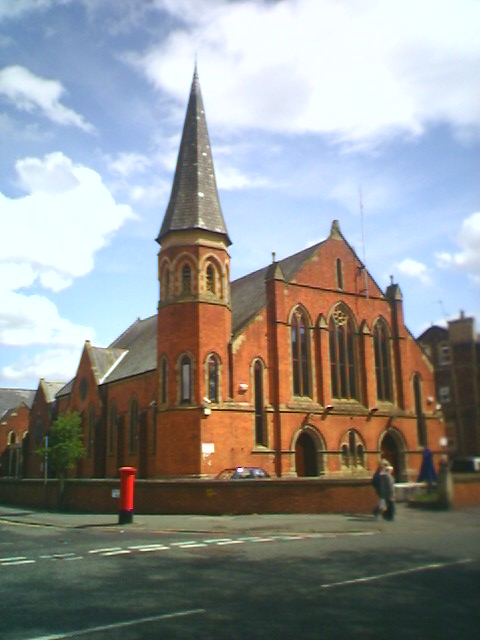
Abedi's family regularly attended the Didsbury Mosque.

Abedi's sister said her brother was motivated by the injustice of Muslim children dying in bombings stemming from the United States-led intervention in the Syrian civil war. A family friend of the Abedi's also remarked that Salman had vowed revenge at the funeral of Abdul Wahab Hafidah, who was run over and stabbed to death by a Manchester gang on 12 May 2016 and was a friend of Salman and his younger brother Hashem. Hashem later co-ordinated the Manchester bombing with his brother. During the police investigation, they uncovered evidence that the two had participated in the Libyan civil war and had met with members of Al-Qaeda in the Islamic Maghreb. Police uncovered photographs with the brothers alongside the sons of Abu Anas al-Libi, a high ranking Al-Qaeda fighter in Libya.

The Islamic State (ISIS) released a statement on the messaging app Telegram on 23 May claiming responsibility. In the statement, ISIS said that a "soldier of the Khilafah" detonated an explosive amidst a crowd of 'the crusaders in the British city of Manchester'. United States director of national intelligence Dan Coats said—before the Senate Armed Services Committee—that ISIS frequently claims responsibility and the United States could not confirm their claims. Former Federal Bureau of Investigation (FBI) agent Ali Soufan noted the inaccuracy in their statement and suggested their media apparatus was weaker than usual; the statement claims that the bomb exploded in the middle of the arena, not its foyer. Then French interior minister Gérard Collomb said in an interview with BFM TV that Abedi may have been to Syria, and had "proven" links with ISIS.

An investigation by Greater Manchester Police into a report by the BBC that an imam of the Didsbury Mosque, where Abedi and his family were regulars, had made a call for armed jihad 10 days before Abedi bought his concert ticket, found that no offences had been committed.

=== Reconnaissance ===
According to German police sources, Abedi transited through Düsseldorf Airport on his way home to Manchester from Istanbul four days before the bombing. Abedi returned to Manchester on 18 May after a trip to Libya. Closed-circuit television (CCTV) footage identified Abedi multiple times prior to the bombing. On 18 May, at 18:14, CCTV footage first identified him leaving the Shudehill Interchange, briefly talking to a Manchester Arena worker before observing the queues and entrances within the City Room. (Note: The City Room is part of the Victoria Exchange Complex and also referred to as the foyer.) Abedi was spotted in the City Room on 21 May at 18:53 and on 22 May at 18:34, approximately 30 minutes after Grande's performance began. In all three visits, Abedi was noted using his mobile phone and did not appear to carry an explosive.

=== Building the bomb ===
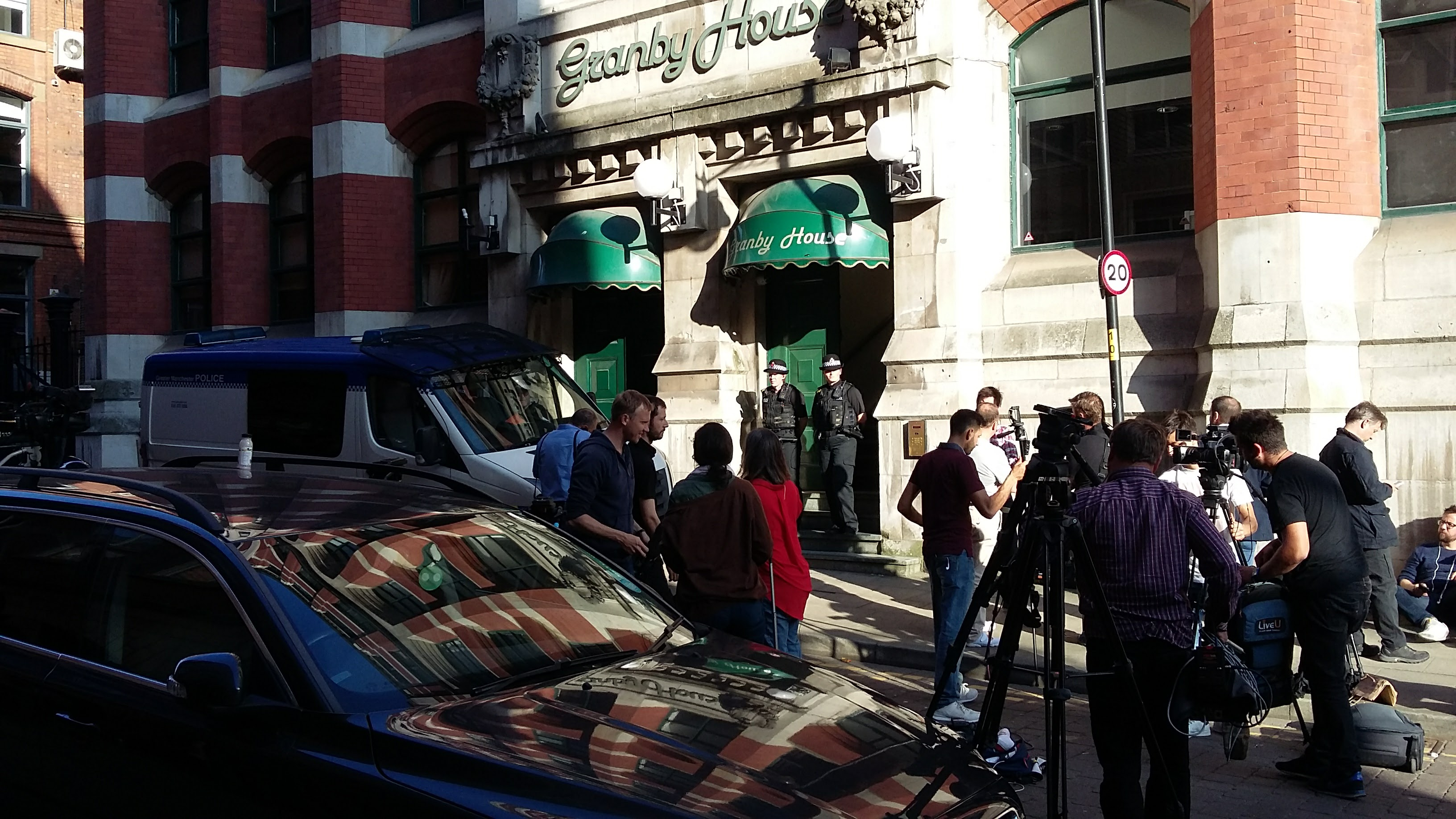
Police outside the entrance of Granby House, inside which Abedi had assembled the device, on 24 May

After returning to Manchester, Abedi bought bomb-making material, apparently constructing the acetone peroxide-based bomb by himself. It is known that many members of the ISIS Battar brigade trained people in bomb-making in Libya. According to The New York Times, the bomb was 'an improvised device made with forethought and care'. Metal nuts and screws were found, suggesting that it was intended to be a nail bomb. Images released by The New York Times show an explosive charge inside a lightweight metal container which was carried within a black vest or a blue Karrimor backpack. His torso was propelled by the blast through the doors to the arena, possibly indicating that the explosive charge was held in the backpack and blew him forward on detonation. A corroded 12-volt, 2.1 amp-hour lead acid battery manufactured by GS Yuasa was found at the scene. A coroner's inquest suggested that the bomb was strong enough to kill people up to 20 metres (66 ft) away. Michael McCaul, a US representative and then chairman of the House Homeland Security Committee claimed that the bomb contained triacetone triperoxide (TATP), described by McCaul as "a classic explosive device used by terrorists".

== Bombing ==
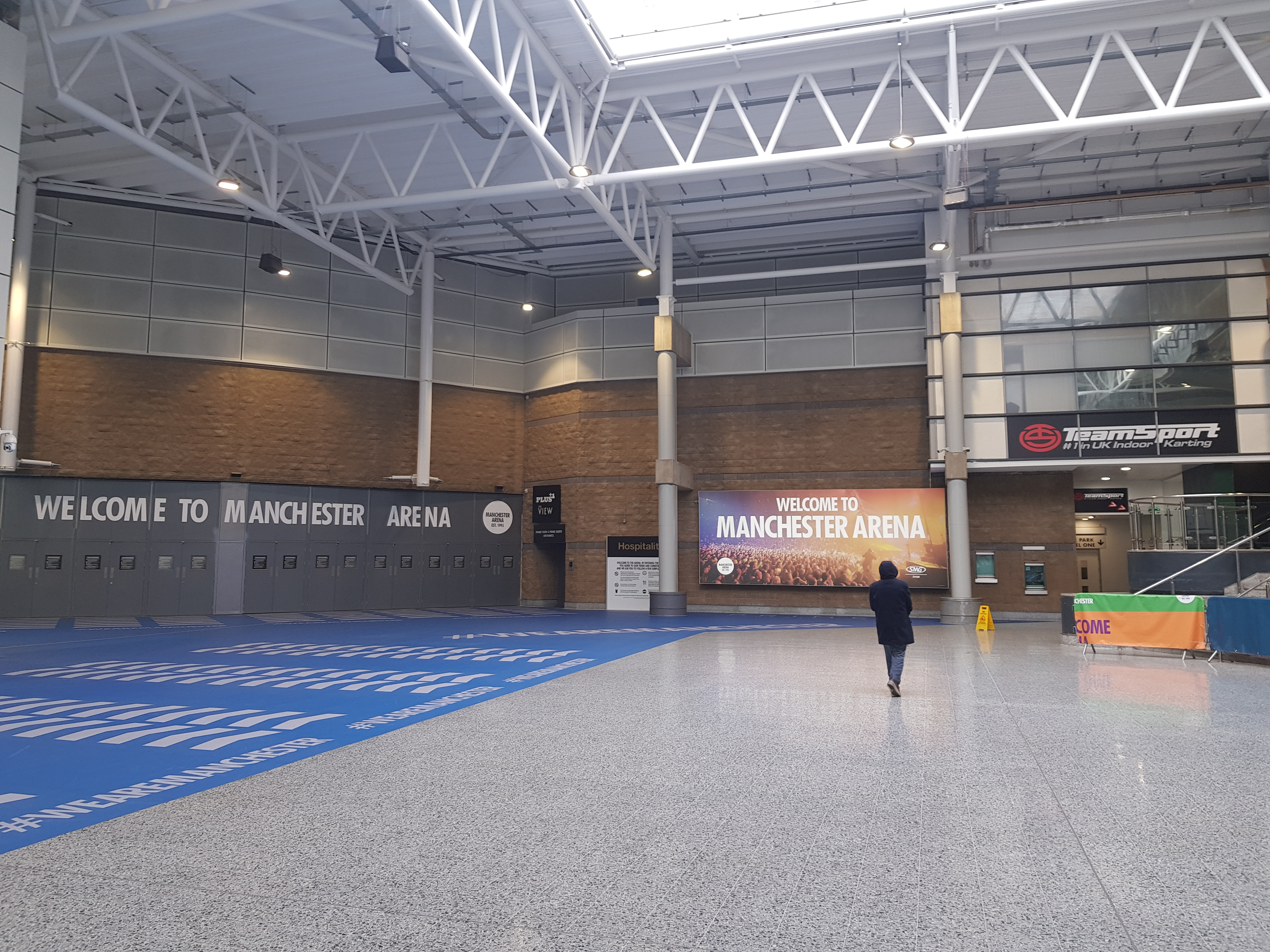
The City Room, pictured in 2020 after renovations

The concert began at around 19:35. From approximately 20:30 to 20:51, Abedi moved from the Shudehill Interchange to the City Room, moving towards the men's toilet on the Victoria station concourse at 20:36 and departing at 20:48. During his visit to the toilet, he was seen by two British Transport Police (BTP) community support officers and two Showsec security guards. Using the station concourse lift, he made his way towards the City Room. From 20:51 to 21:10, he was spotted by a Showsec employee for less than ten seconds on the mezzanine of the City Room before moving back towards the tram platform at 21:13. While in the City Room, Abedi hid in a spot that was not covered by the arena's CCTV system. Abedi made his final journey towards the City Room at 21:29, arriving at 21:33. Abedi was spotted by a person who was hired to prevent illegal screen recordings of the concert—by 22:00. She said that she had informed a BTP constable of Abedi's presence, who stated that she had no recollection of such a conversation.

A video from a concertgoer showing the inside of the arena immediately after the bombing

Grande began performing at 21:00 and the concert drew to a close shortly before 22:30. According to a Libyan official, Abedi spoke with his younger brother, Hashem, on the phone about 15 minutes before the attack was carried out. Five BTP constables were scheduled to patrol the Victoria Exchange Complex, although only four were in attendance by the time of the bombing. None of the four constables were present in the City Room between 22:00 and 22:31; two constables had left on their dinner break. The police constables had ignored briefings to stagger their breaks during the concert and had ignored instructions to be in place at the City Room entrance of the arena 30 minutes prior to the end of the concert. Although Showsec expected an egress and a supervisor was present in the City Room between 22:08 and 22:17, the supervisor did not go up to the mezzanine and did not spot Abedi. Abedi was spotted again at 22:12 by another member of the public, who asked what he had in his bag. He was concerned that the bag may have contained a bomb after he did not answer and reported him, to which he was told that the BTP were already aware of Abedi. After being told of the concerns, a Showsec employee was afraid that he would be considered a racist and did not approach Abedi. While he attempted to get through on the radio, heavy radio traffic prevented him from reaching any other people. As the concert ended, concert-goers left through the City Room, one of four entrances into the arena. At 22:30, Abedi descended from the mezzanine.

At exactly 22:31 (21:31 UTC), the nail bomb, weighing in excess of 30 kilograms (66 lb), detonated in the City Room, and 23 people, including Abedi, were killed and 239 more were injured physically.

== Casualties ==
An estimated 14,200 people were at the concert when the bomb exploded. The explosion killed the attacker along with 22 concert-goers and parents who were in the entrance waiting to pick up their children following the show; 119 people were initially reported as injured. This number was revised by police to 250 on 22 June, with the addition of severe psychological trauma and minor injuries. In May 2018, the number of injured was revised to 800. During the public inquiry into the bombing, it was updated in December 2020 to 1,017 people sustaining injuries. A study published in September 2019 said that 239 of the injuries were physical. The dead included ten people aged under 20; the youngest victim was an eight-year-old girl and the oldest was a 51-year-old woman. Of the 22 victims, twenty were from Britain and two were UK-based Polish nationals. Police and family of 29-year-old victim Martyn Hett, who was 4 metres (13 ft) away from the blast and after whom Martyn's Law was named, stated that due to the severity of the explosion, he could only be identified by a tattoo of Deirdre Barlow on his leg.

== Response and relief ==
=== Police response ===
==== British Transport Police ====
Within a minute of the bombing, a police constable sent a radio message saying 'We need more people at Victoria, we just had a loud bang', through the BTP channel. Two sergeants were in the Peninsula Building and ran towards the arena when they heard the explosion. One of them called for a sitrep at 22:33. At 22:34, the BTP command centre was told that there were 'at least twenty casualties' and the explosion was 'definitely [caused by] a bomb'. BTP's command centre called for the North West Ambulance Service (NWAS) and the Greater Manchester Police (GMP). The first vehicle arrived at 22:34. A BTP constable confirmed the location at 22:39 as the 'ticket office in the arena' and said there were 60 casualties.

==== Greater Manchester Police ====
At 22:31:52, the first 999 call reporting a bombing at the arena was made by an injured bystander. The second call, placed at 22:32:40, incorrectly stated that there were gunshots alongside the explosion. The force duty officer on the night of the attack became aware of the bombing at 22:34 and immediately deployed firearms officers. He arrived on the adjacent Trinity Way by 22:39 and communicated that the attack may have been a fireworks display at 22:39:30. A separate firearms officer said that there were 'major casualties' at 22:41 and mentioned Operation Plato, the response to a marauding terrorist attack (MTA). At 22:42:44, the first two GMP officers were spotted on CCTV through the lower doors on Trinity Way, while three arrived through the Victoria station. Operation Plato was declared at 22:47, and a 'major incident' was declared at 23:04. At 01:32, a precautionary controlled explosion was carried out on a suspicious item in Cathedral Gardens.

=== Ambulance service response ===
At 22:32, a member of the public made a 999 call about the explosion and identified where he was, the foyer, and the location of the detonation. The North West Ambulance Service reported that 60 of its ambulances attended the scene, carried 59 people to local hospitals and treated walking wounded on site. Michael Daley, an off-duty consultant anaesthetist was entered into the British Medical Journal's book of valour for his bravery in June 2017. Of those hospitalised, 12 were children under the age of 16. In total, 112 people were hospitalised for their injuries and 27 were treated for injuries that did not require hospitalisation. Out of this total of 139, 79 were children.

=== Government aid and response ===
All acts of terrorism are cowardly attacks on innocent people, but this attack stands out for its appalling, sickening cowardice, deliberately targeting innocent, defenceless children and young people who should have been enjoying one of the most memorable nights of their lives.

— Theresa May, 23 May 2017

Prime Minister Theresa May spoke in front of 10 Downing Street to condemn the 'sickening cowardice' of the attack. She then travelled to Manchester with Home Secretary Amber Rudd. That morning, May led an emergency Cabinet Office Briefing Rooms (COBR) meeting. The meeting raised the United Kingdom's threat level to 'critical', its highest level. On 27 May, the threat level was reduced to 'severe', its previous status.

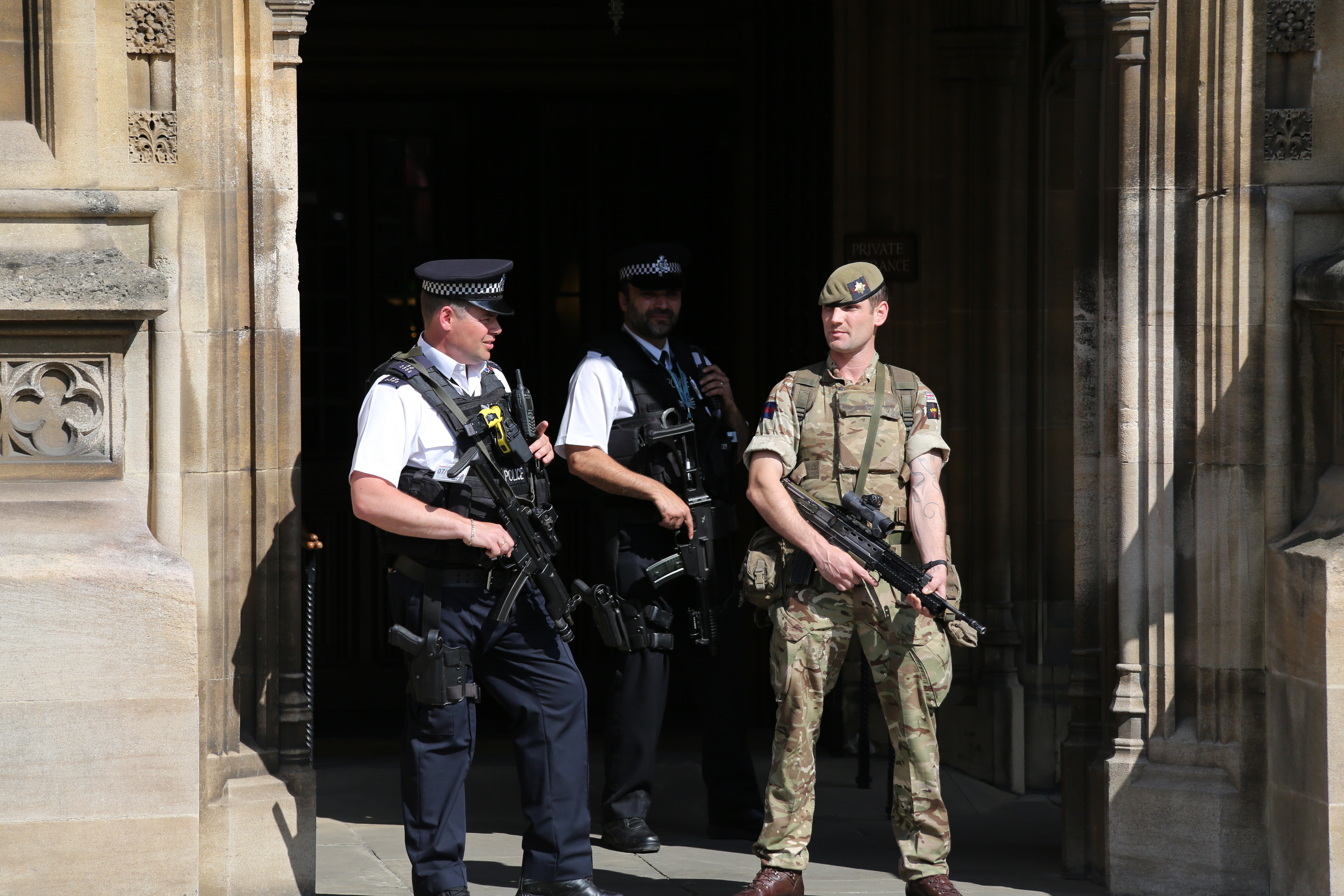
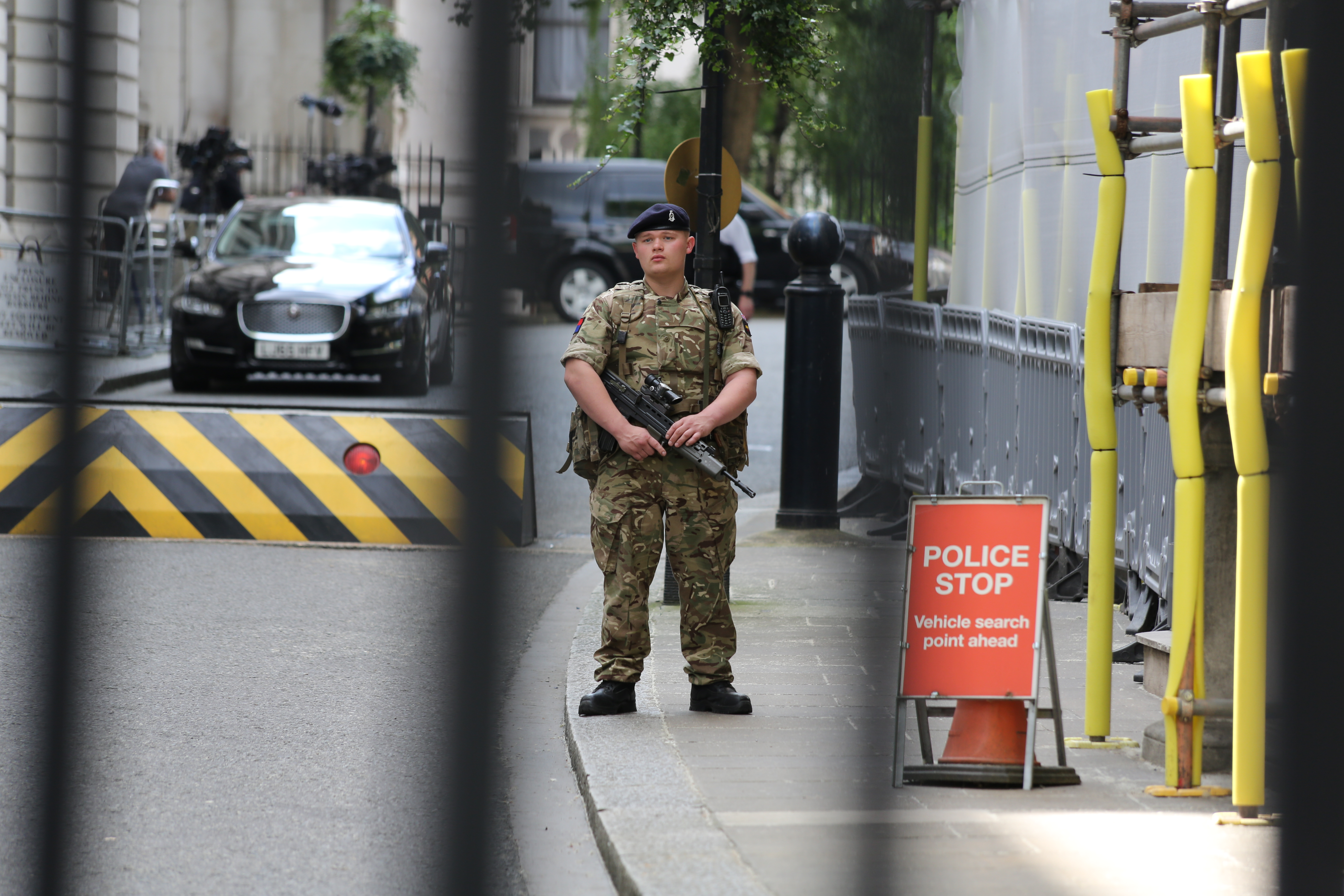
Operation Temperer deployed more than a thousand military personnel at high-profile locations in London, such as the Palace of Westminster (left) and Downing Street (right).

The bombing set into motion Operation Temperer for the first time since it was put into place following the Charlie Hebdo shooting in January 2015. Two days after the attack, a total of 984 military personnel were deployed across London, including at high-profile locations, including the Palace of Westminster, Buckingham Palace, Ministry of Defence Main Building, and some nuclear sites. Tours of the Palace of Westminster and the guard-changing ceremony at Buckingham Palace were cancelled. A total of 1,400 personnel were deployed by 30 May, when the operation was deactivated. The Commission for Countering Extremism was created in the aftermath of the bombing.

In November 2017, Greater Manchester mayor Andy Burnham said that Theresa May had intended to only pay £12 million of the £28 million estimated to help the city rebuild, leading to criticism. May later fully reimbursed the city of Manchester in January 2018. A study published in the American Political Science Review in 2021 observed May's approval ratings following the bombing. Although the researchers expected a result indicative of the rally 'round the flag effect—in which the approval ratings of a political leader increases in the wake of a crisis or war—May's approval ratings decreased. The researchers suggested that May's gender played a role in the public's response, writing that female leaders 'cannot count on rallies following major terrorist attacks'. The GMP reported a surge in anti-Muslim hate crimes in the wake of the bombing.

Various British figures and politicians expressed condolences following the bombing. Queen Elizabeth II visited Royal Manchester Children's Hospital to meet with victims on 25 May, calling it 'very wicked' to attack children. Burnham said the attack was 'evil'. Thousands, joined by Rudd, Burnham and then Labour Party leader Jeremy Corbyn, gathered in Albert Square to remember the victims. Bishop of Manchester David Walker lit a candle at the vigil. The Muslim Council of Britain condemned the attack and called it 'horrific'. A national minute's silence was observed on 25 May; in St Ann's Square, the silence ended with a round of applause followed by Oasis' 'Don't Look Back in Anger'. The attack occurred two weeks before the 2017 United Kingdom general election; campaign activities by the Labour and Conservative parties were suspended.

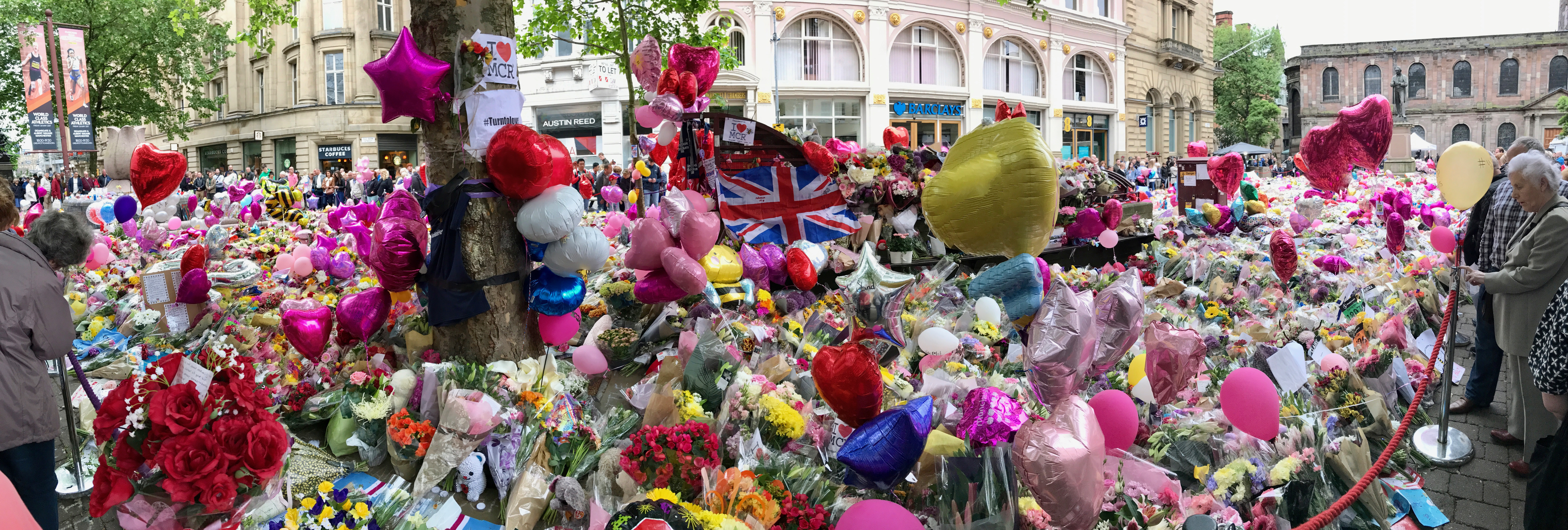
Panoramic view of the floral tribute in St Ann's Square

=== International reaction ===
Ariana Grande
(@ArianaGrande)
tweeted:

broken.
from the bottom of my heart, i am so so sorry. i don't have words.

23 May 2017

International reactions came from many countries and political leaders after the bombing, including from US president Donald Trump, Canadian prime minister Justin Trudeau, German chancellor Angela Merkel, French president Emmanuel Macron, president of the European Commission Jean-Claude Juncker, Chinese president Xi Jinping, Indian prime minister Narendra Modi and Russian president Vladimir Putin. The British Overseas Territory of Gibraltar ordered all flags on government buildings be flown at half-mast. Pope Francis offered his condolences.

Ariana Grande tweeted a sympathy message on 23 May, becoming the most-liked tweet on Twitter until former US president Barack Obama's tweet following the Unite the Right rally in Charlottesville, Virginia. Us Weekly reported that Grande returned to her home in Florida and immediately paused her Dangerous Woman Tour. In a 2018 interview with British Vogue, Grande said she was suffering from post-traumatic stress disorder (PTSD) as a result of the attack.

==== One Love Manchester ====
On 30 May, Grande announced a benefit concert entitled One Love Manchester for the We Love Manchester emergency fund established by Manchester City Council and the British Red Cross. The concert, which was held at Old Trafford Cricket Ground on 4 June, featured Grande, pop group Take That, singer Miley Cyrus, rapper Pharrell Williams, Irish singer-songwriter Niall Horan formerly of One Direction and R&B singer Usher. Free tickets were given to attendees of the Manchester Arena show. By 5 June, the concert had raised US$13 million. Additional money was raised through a re-release of Grande's 2014 single "One Last Time" as a charity single, as well as a cover of "Over the Rainbow" from The Wizard of Oz (1939). On 14 June, Grande was made the first honorary citizen of Manchester.

== Investigations and inquiries ==
The property in Fallowfield where Abedi lived was raided on 23 May. Armed police breached the house with a controlled explosion and searched it. Abedi's 23-year-old brother was arrested in Chorlton-cum-Hardy in south Manchester in relation to the attack. Police carried out raids in two other areas of south Manchester and another address in the Whalley Range area. Three other men were arrested, and police initially spoke of a network supporting the bomber; they later announced that Abedi had sourced all the bomb components himself and that they now believed he had largely acted alone. On 6 July, police said that they believed others had been aware of Abedi's plans. A total of 22 people were arrested in connection with the attack, but had all been released without charge by 11 June following the police's conclusion that Abedi was likely to have acted alone, even though others may have been aware of his plans.

Within hours of the attack, Abedi's name and other information given confidentially to security services in the United States and France were leaked to the press, leading to condemnation from Home Secretary Amber Rudd. Following the publication of crime scene photographs of the backpack bomb used in the attack in the 24 May edition of The New York Times, United Kingdom counterterrorism police chiefs said the release of the material was detrimental to the investigation. On 25 May, the GMP said it had stopped sharing information on the attack with the US intelligence services. Theresa May said she would make clear to then president Donald Trump that 'intelligence that has been shared must be made secure.' Trump described the leaks to the news media as 'deeply troubling' and pledged to carry out a full investigation. British officials blamed the leaks on 'the breakdown of normal discipline at the White House and in the US security services'. The New York Times editor Dean Baquet declined to apologise for publishing the backpack bomb photographs, saying 'We live in different press worlds' and that the material was not classified at the highest level. On 26 May, then United States secretary of state Rex Tillerson said the United States government accepted responsibility for the leaks.

A public inquiry into the attack was launched in September 2020. The first of three reports to be produced was a 200-page report published on 17 June 2021. It found that "there were a number of missed opportunities to alter the course of what happened that night" and that "more should have been done" by police and private security guards to prevent the bombing. In February 2022, it was reported that security services were 'struggling to cope' during the period leading up to the bombing. One MI5 officer told the inquiry that he had warned superiors that something might get through due to large numbers of documents needing processing. Intelligence that MI5 had before the attack and which might have led to Salman Abedi being placed under investigation was not passed to counter-terrorism police. The Manchester Arena Inquiry published a press release announcing that the inquiry officially concluded on 8 June 2023. On 18 October 2023, Coroner Sir John Saunders ruled that Salman Abedi's death was 'suicide while undertaking a terror attack'.

On 27 March 2018, a report by civil servant Bob Kerslake and commissioned by mayor Andy Burnham was published. The Kerslake Report was "an independent review into the preparedness for, and emergency response to, the Manchester Arena attack." In the report, Kerslake largely praised the Greater Manchester Police and British Transport Police, and noted that it was 'fortuitous' that the North West Ambulance Service was unaware of the declaration of Operation Plato, a protocol under which all responders should have withdrawn from the arena in case of an active killer on the premises. However, it found that the Greater Manchester Fire and Rescue Service was "brought to a point of paralysis" as their response was delayed for two hours due to poor communication between the firefighters' liaison officer and the police force. The report was critical of Vodafone for the catastrophic failure of an emergency helpline hosted on a platform provided by Content Guru, saying that delays in getting information caused "significant stress and upset" to families. It also criticised some news media, saying, 'To have experienced such intrusive and overbearing behaviour at a time of such enormous vulnerability seemed to us to be completely and utterly unacceptable', but noting that, 'We recognise that this was some, but by no means all of the media and that the media also have a positive and important role to play.'

=== Salman Abedi ===
Salman Abedi, bomber of Manchester Arena

The bomber, Salman Ramadan Abedi (31 December 1994 – 22 May 2017) was identified as a 22-year-old British Muslim of Libyan ancestry. According to US intelligence sources, Abedi was identified by the bank card that he had with him and the identification was confirmed using facial recognition technology. He was born in Manchester to a Salafi family of Libyan-born refugees who had settled in south Manchester after fleeing to the United Kingdom to escape the government of Muammar Gaddafi. He had two brothers and a sister. Abedi grew up in Whalley Range and lived in Fallowfield. Neighbours described the Abedis as a very traditional and 'super religious' family, who regularly attended Didsbury Mosque. Abedi attended Wellacre Technology College, Burnage Academy for Boys and The Manchester College. A former tutor remarked that Abedi was 'a very slow, uneducated and passive person'. He was among a group of students at his high school who accused a teacher of Islamophobia for asking them what they thought of suicide bombers. He also reportedly said to his friends that being a suicide bomber 'was okay' and fellow college students raised concerns about his behaviour.

Abedi's father was a member of the Libyan Islamic Fighting Group, a Salafi jihadist organisation proscribed by the United Nations, and father and son fought for the group in Libya in 2011 as part of the movement to overthrow Muammar Gaddafi. Abedi's parents, both born in Tripoli, remained in Libya in 2011, while 17-year-old Abedi returned to live in the United Kingdom. He took a gap year in 2014, when he returned with his brother Hashem to Libya to live with his parents. Abedi was injured in Ajdabiya that year while fighting for an Islamist group. The brothers were rescued from Tripoli by the Royal Navy survey ship HMS Enterprise in August 2014 as part of a group of 110 British citizens as the Libyan civil war erupted, taken to Malta and flown back to the UK. According to a retired European intelligence officer, speaking on condition of anonymity, Abedi met with members of the ISIS Battar brigade in Sabratha, Libya and continued to be in contact with the group upon his return to the UK. An imam at Didsbury mosque recalled that Abedi looked at him with hate after he preached against ISIS and Ansar al-Sharia in 2015.

According to an acquaintance, Abedi was 'outgoing' and consumed alcohol, while another said that he was a 'regular kid who went out and drank' until about 2016. Abedi was also known to have used cannabis. He enrolled at the University of Salford in September 2014, where he studied business administration, before dropping out to work in a bakery. Manchester police believe Abedi used student loans to finance the plot, including travel overseas to learn bomb-making. The Guardian reported that despite dropping out from further education, he was still receiving student loan funding in April 2017.

He was known to British security services and police but was not regarded as a high risk, having been linked to petty crime but never flagged up for radical views. A community worker told the BBC he had called a hotline five years before the bombing to warn police about Abedi's views and members of Britain's Libyan diaspora said they had 'warned authorities for years' about Manchester's Islamist radicalisation. Abedi was allegedly reported to authorities for his extremism by five community leaders and family members and had been banned from a mosque; the Chief Constable of Greater Manchester, however, said Abedi was not known to the Prevent anti-radicalisation programme.

On 29 May 2017, MI5 launched an internal inquiry into its handling of the warnings it had received about Abedi and a second, 'more in depth' inquiry, into how it missed the danger. On 22 November 2018, the Intelligence and Security Committee of Parliament published a report which said that MI5 had acted 'too slowly' in its dealings with Abedi. The committee's report noted 'What we can say is that there were a number of a failings in the handling of Salman Abedi's case. While it is impossible to say whether these would have prevented the devastating attack on 22 May, we have concluded that as a result of the failings, potential opportunities to prevent it were missed.'

=== Hashem Abedi ===
Abedi's younger brother, Hashem (born 8 April 1997), was arrested by Libyan security forces on 23 May. Hashem was suspected of planning an attack in Libya, was said to be in regular touch with Salman and was aware of the plan to bomb the arena, but not the date. On 1 November 2017, the UK requested Libya to extradite Hashem to return to the United Kingdom, in order to face trial.

On 17 July 2019, Hashem was charged with murder, attempted murder and conspiracy to cause an explosion. He had been arrested in Libya and extradited to the United Kingdom. His trial began on 5 February 2020. On 17 March, Hashem Abedi was found guilty on 22 charges of murder, on the grounds that he had helped his brother to source the materials used in the bombing and had assisted with the manufacture of the explosives which were used in the attack. On 20 August, Hashem Abedi was sentenced to life imprisonment with a minimum term of 55 years. The judge, Jeremy Baker, said that sentencing rules prevented him from imposing a whole life order as Abedi had been 20 years old at the time of the offence. The minimum age for a whole life order is 21 years old. Abedi's 55-year minimum term is the longest minimum term ever imposed by a British court.

On 12 April 2025, Hashem Abedi attacked prison officers at HM Prison Frankland by throwing hot cooking oil on them, and stabbed them with makeshift weapons. Three officers were hospitalised with serious injuries. The incident occurred in a separation centre for prisoners regarded as dangerous and extremist. Abedi had previously been convicted for assaulting prison officers at HM Prison Belmarsh in 2022.

=== Ismail Abedi ===
In October 2021, it was reported that Abedi's older brother, Ismail, had left the United Kingdom. He had been summonsed by Judge John Saunders to testify before the public inquiry into the bombing. Saunders had refused Ismail's request for immunity from prosecution while testifying. Ismail was found guilty in absentia of failing to comply with a legal notice and a warrant was issued for his arrest.

== Aftermath ==
Manchester Arena was closed until 9 September, when it opened with a benefit concert featuring Oasis songwriter Noel Gallagher alongside other acts from North West England.

=== Legislation ===
In December 2022, Martyn's Law—a venue security law named after victim Martyn Hett—was expected to be introduced, but the legislation was not put to Parliament before the 2024 general election. The Terrorism (Protection of Premises) Bill, known as Martyn's Law, was included in the King's speech at the 2024 State Opening of Parliament and was put before Parliament in September 2024.

=== Building security and considerations ===
According to the Kerslake Report, security at the arena was insufficient. Although bag searches were performed, they were inconsistent; Abedi entered through the City Room, which was outside of the security zone.

=== Harassment ruling against conspiracy theorist ===
In October 2024, two survivors of the bombing won a harassment case, in the High Court, against former television producer Richard Hall, who had claimed without evidence that the attack was an elaborate hoax by British government agencies and that no one was genuinely injured. High Court judge Mrs Justice Steyn said, in a written ruling, that the claimants had succeeded in their harassment claim. She added that a separate data protection claim would be decided at a later stage. In November 2024, the court awarded £45,000 in damages for the harassment, £22,500 to be paid to each survivor.

=== Legal proceedings ===
In December 2025, Manchester Civil Courts of Justice approved civil settlements totalling nearly £20 million for 16 children who were injured in the bombing, with individual payments ranging from £2,770 to over £11 million depending on the severity of injuries. The damages were awarded against organisations responsible for the arena's security and operation, as well as police forces involved in the response.

== Memorial ==
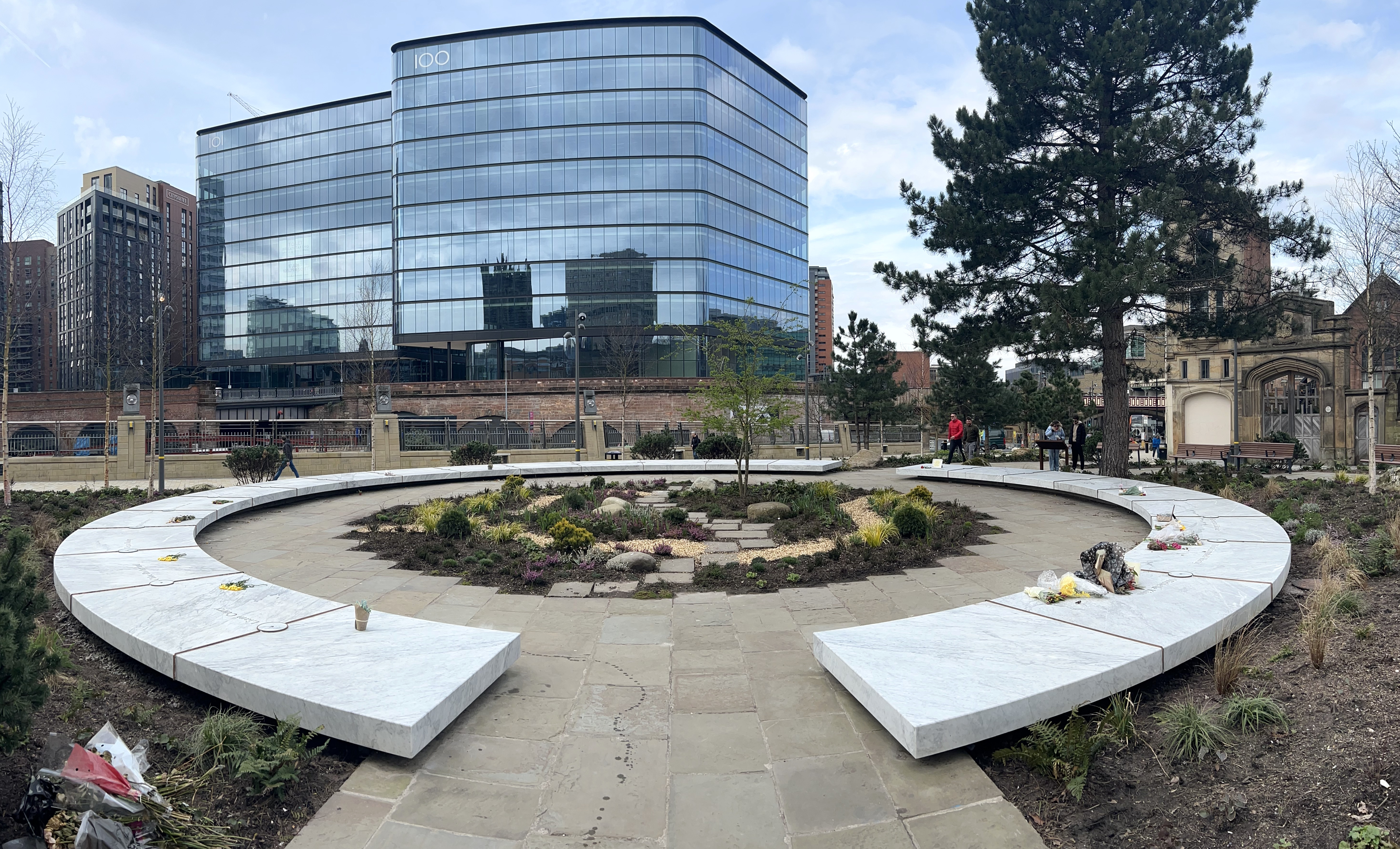
The Glade of Light opened in 2022 to commemorate the victims of the bombing.

The victims of the bombing are commemorated by The Glade of Light, a garden memorial located in Manchester city centre near Manchester Cathedral. The memorial opened to the public on 5 January 2022 and an official opening event took place 10 May 2022.

The memorial was vandalised on 9 February 2022, causing £10,000 of damage. A 24-year-old man admitted to the offence and was given a two-year community order on 22 June 2022.

== See also ==
- List of terrorist incidents in Great Britain
- List of terrorist incidents in May 2017
- Manchester synagogue attack
