= Bruce Byron =

English actor (born 1959)

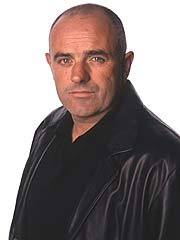
- Born: Bruce Michael Byron; 13 March 1959 (age 67); Fulham, London, England
- Years active: 1991–present
- Spouse: Tanya Sichel (m. 1997)
- Children: 2

Bruce Michael Byron (born 13 March 1959) is an English actor best known for his role as DC Terry Perkins in The Bill. He originally followed a career in music, before started acting at 20.

== Biography ==
Byron moved to Australia drilling for oil and gas in the Cooper Basin, then came back to England but could not get a place at drama school. Eventually, he was accepted for ARTTS International in Bubwith, East Riding of Yorkshire.

Films he has appeared in include The Messenger: The Story of Joan of Arc, From Hell and, most notably, The Mummy Returns where he played Red Willits. He also appeared in Heartbeat in 1998 and as Robbie Jackson's father Gary Bolton in EastEnders in 2001.

He married Dr Tanya Byron (presenter of BBC's Little Angels and The House of Tiny Tearaways and daughter of director John Sichel) in Barnet, London, in 1997. He has two children with her: Lily (born 1995) and Jack (born 1998).

Byron made a series of guest appearances in The Bill, the last of which in 2003 as DC Terry Perkins from neighbouring station Barton Street, led to him joining the series full-time as the same character; he played Terry for seven years until the show ended in 2010.

He also played Phil Dans in Casualty on 10 March and 17 March 2012, series 26; episode 26 and episode 31.

== Filmography ==
Year	Title	Role	Notes
1991	Shadows in the City	Frankie	
1994–2010	The Bill	Various	
1997	Pie in the Sky	Terry Lees	Episode: "Return Match"
1997	Wycliffe	Blackie Tremain	Episode: "Close to Home"
1998	Still Crazy	Snotty Reporter	
1999	Mansfield Park	Carriage Driver	
1999	Gregory's Two Girls	Government Official (Telfor)	
1999	The Messenger: The Story of Joan of Arc	Joan's Father	
1999 - 2000	Daylight Robbery (TV series)	Phil Murphy	
2000	Last Resort	Police Officer	
2001	The Mummy Returns	Red Willits	
2001	EastEnders	Gary Bolton	3 episodes
2001	From Hell	Ann Crook's Father	
2001	Dalziel and Pascoe	Ron Harvey	Episode: "Truth and Consequences"
2002	Club Le Monde	Terry	
2002	Tomorrow La Scala!	Thomas	
2002	Shackleton	Harbour	Miniseries
2003	In Deep	Martin Needham	2 Episodes
2003	I'll Sleep When I'm Dead	Eddy	
2003	Hitler: The Rise of Evil	Mueller	Miniseries
2012	Casualty	Phil Dans	2 episodes
2013	The Double	Skinhead	
2014	Holby City	Ronnie Dale	Episode: "The Win"
2020	Doctors	Bruce Brodie	Episode: "Empathy"
