= Am I Normal? =

- Genre: Science documentary
- Country of origin: United Kingdom
- Language: English
- Home station: BBC Radio 4
- Hosted by: Vivienne Parry
- Produced by: Anna Buckley, Fiona Roberts, Katy Hickman, Erika Wright, Deborah Cohen, Fiona Hill, Geraldine Fitzgerald, Alison Hughes, Julian Siddle, Pamela Rutherford
- Original release: 22 August 2006 – 10 August 2011
- No. of series: 8
- No. of episodes: 34

Am I Normal? is a BBC Radio 4 science documentary programme presented by Vivienne Parry. The programme examines what constitutes "normal" with regard to physical and psychological health, exploring where medical professionals draw boundaries between typical variation and conditions requiring treatment. The Guardian described it as "fascinating stuff".

== Format ==
Each episode features Parry interviewing doctors, patients, and scientific experts about a specific topic, questioning assumptions about normality. Parry uses an alphabet board to communicate with guests, and a transcriber writes down what she spells out. Topics covered across the eight series included cancer, blood pressure, childbirth, dyslexia, drinking, depression, ageing, autism, sexuality, immunology, obsessive-compulsive disorder, health anxiety, and eating behaviour.

== Broadcast history ==
The programme ran for eight series and 34 episodes between August 2006 and August 2011:

- Series 1: 22 August – 12 September 2006
- Series 2: 14 November – 12 December 2006
- Series 3: 31 July – 21 August 2007
- Series 4: 4–25 March 2008
- Series 5: 30 September – 21 October 2008
- Series 6: 24 February – 17 March 2009
- Series 7: 2–23 March 2010
- Series 8: 19 July – 10 August 2011

The first episode examined psychosis.

=== Television adaptation ===
In April 2008, a four-part television adaptation aired on BBC Two, presented by psychologist Tanya Byron rather than Parry. The television series explored the themes of addiction, faith, sex, and body image, examining questions such as whether behavioural addictions are genuine physiological conditions and how hearing religious voices differs from auditory hallucinations.
