= Breighton =

Village in the East Riding of Yorkshire, England

Coordinates: 53.796883°N 0.924146°W

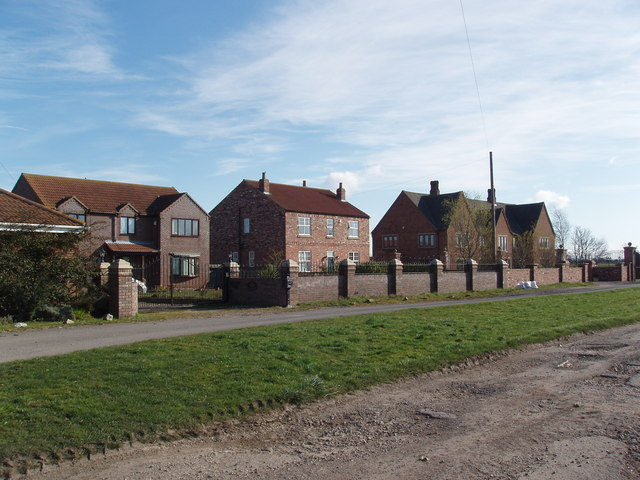
- Housing in Breighton

- Location within the East Riding of Yorkshire
- OS grid reference: SE709339
  - London: 160 mi (260 km) S
- Civil parish: Bubwith
- Unitary authority: East Riding of Yorkshire
- Ceremonial county: East Riding of Yorkshire
- Region: Yorkshire and the Humber
- Country: England
- Sovereign state: United Kingdom
- Post town: SELBY
- Postcode district: YO8
- Dialling code: 01757
- Police: Humberside
- Fire: Humberside
- Ambulance: Yorkshire
- UK Parliament: Goole and Pocklington

Breighton is a village in the East Riding of Yorkshire, England. It is situated on the east bank of the River Derwent, approximately 5 miles (8 km) north-west of Howden. It forms part of the civil parish of Bubwith.

== History ==
Breighton as a village is very historic, with it likely being founded as a result of the Menthrope Ferry, often referred to the ferry boat by locals. The name Breighton derives from either the Old English beorht meaning 'bright' or the Old Norse personal name Beorhta, and the Old English tūn meaning 'settlement'. The village was recorded as Bricstune in the Domesday Book around 1086. Breighton village has existed since at least 1361, with it being recorded that the manor house was in Ruin at the time. By 1433 it had been rebuilt as Eleanor, the daughter of Sir Robert Roos, was born in the building which was recorded due to the requirement to verify the date of birth in 1499. Other than this information very little is publicly available about the village's history, particularly due to the more important and prominent village of Bubwith to the north.

In 1672 the village was described as a ''well-hearthed village'' and ''probably fairly wealthy'' by the Hearth tax returns. The largest house at the time was the home of Mr Parish, who likely lived in the manor house at the time however this is not recorded. There were a number of landowners that had interests in the village at the time including the Archbishop of York who was the largest landowner in the area until the 1870s. After the Archbishop of York the Liversidges became lords of the manor, they kept ownership of the estates until 1918.

To the north-west of the main village is the Breighton Ferry public house. From the Middle Ages until the 1930s a ferry operated across the Derwent to Menthorpe. This ferry service no longer runs, however there is a large number of mooring points still in operation, used for storage of small river craft over the winter, as shown in the photo below in the gallery.

The village has had close ties to Bubwith to the north since its founding. These ties were strengthened in 1944 with the closure of Breighton's Wesleyan chapel, with the village's next closest church or place of worship being in Bubwith. The local school (Dames School) suffered a similar fate however the time of its destruction is not known.

Nearby is RAF Breighton, built between 1940 and 1942 for No. 1 Group RAF, its first residents were the No. 460 Squadron RAAF. After the Second World War, the airfield was used to store Thor missiles, before finally closing in March 1964. It is currently used by the Real Aeroplane Company to house historic aircraft as well as for hosting air shows. RAF Breighton or Breighton Airfield, as it is now commonly known, has the ICAO Code of EGBR.

An air show is held by the Real Aeroplane Club in the summer.

== See also ==
- Listed buildings in Bubwith

== Gallery ==
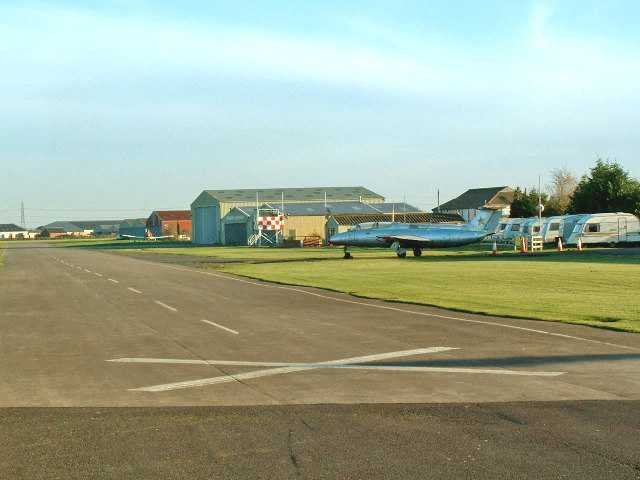
Breighton Airfield and Aeroplane Museum

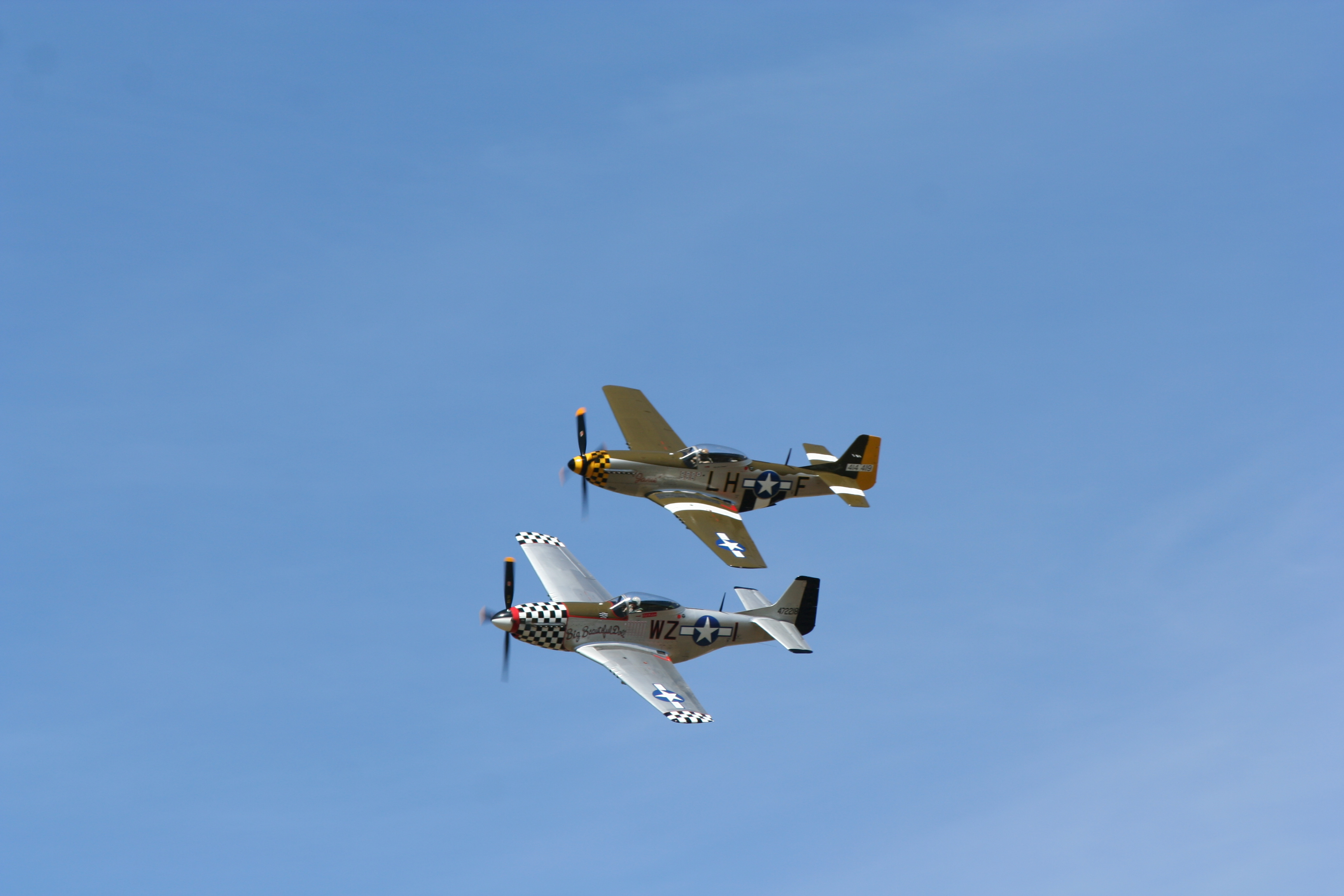
Mustangs Flying During Breighton Airshow

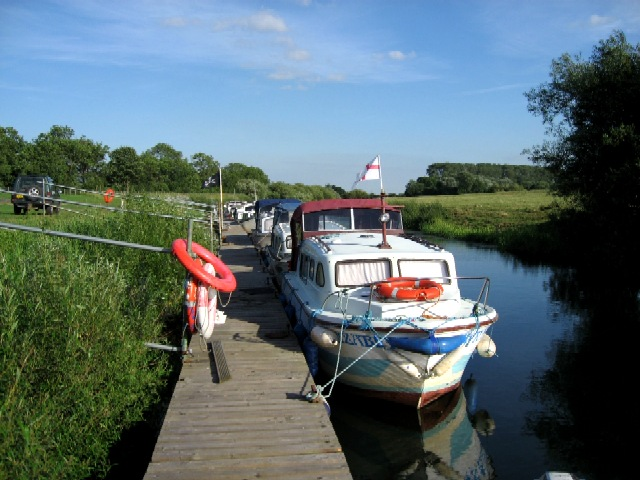
The River Derwent
