= Tanya Byron =

British psychologist (born 1967)

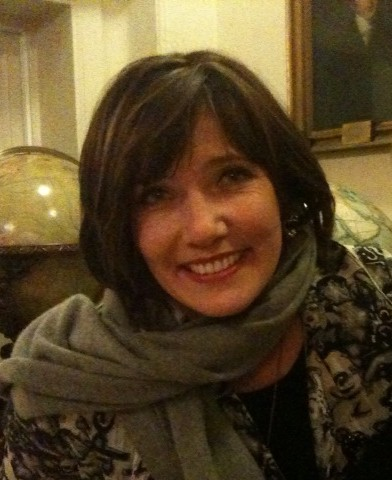
- Byron in December 2009

Chancellor of Edge Hill University
- In office 2008–2018

Personal details
- Born: 6 April 1967 (age 59)
- Spouse: Bruce Byron (m. 1997)
- Children: 2
- Relatives: John Sichel (father); Elfie Corbet (mother)
- Education: University of York (BSc); University College London (MA); University of Surrey (PhD)
- Occupation: Professor of the Public Understanding of Science
- Known for: Clinical psychology, television and radio presenter

Tanya Byron (née Sichel; born 6 April 1967) is a British psychologist, writer, and media personality, best known for her work as a child therapist on television shows Little Angels and The House of Tiny Tearaways. She also co-created the BBC Two sitcom The Life and Times of Vivienne Vyle with Jennifer Saunders, and still contributes articles to various newspapers.

In 2008, she became Professor of the Public Understanding of Science at Edge Hill University and was the first Chancellor of the same institution.

== Early life ==
Byron's father was the film and television director John Sichel, founder of ARTTS International in Yorkshire. Her mother was a nursing sister and a model.

When Byron was 15 years old, her German-born paternal grandmother was murdered by being battered to death by a woman who abused illicit drugs. Her grandmother knew the woman, who was in pursuit of money. Byron was perplexed by this cruelty. To try to understand how anyone could do such a terrible thing, she became interested in psychology.

== Education ==
Byron was educated at North London Collegiate School, University of York (BSc Psychology, 1989), University College London (MSc Clinical Psychology, 1992), and University of Surrey (PhD, 1995). Her PhD thesis was entitled "The evaluation of an outpatient treatment programme for stimulant drug misuse", and was completed at University College Hospital.

== Career ==
Prior to training in Clinical Psychology, Byron worked as a researcher on the BBC's Video Diaries documentary series. Once she qualified, Byron worked in the British National Health Service for 18 years in a number of public health areas such as drug addiction, STDs, and mental disorders.

In 2005, Byron was featured on French and Saunders' Christmas Special as herself, who came in to sort out Dawn and Jennifer's childish behaviour on the show. Subsequently, she co-wrote the series The Life and Times of Vivienne Vyle with Jennifer Saunders.

Byron has also co-authored a book on parenting based on the Little Angels show and two other books on child development and parenting, as well as writing weekly articles for The Times and contributing to several women's magazines. She has also worked with the Home Office on the current changes to the Homicide Act as it relates to children and young people, and she also works with the National Family and Parenting Institute advising government and ministers on related policy.

In September 2007, it was announced that she would head an independent review in England – supported by the Department for Children, Schools, and Families, as well as the Department for Culture, Media, and Sport – into the potentially harmful effects of both the Internet and video games on children.

In May 2008, she was elected as the first Chancellor of Edge Hill University, in Lancashire and installed at a ceremony in December 2008. Edge Hill University also appointed her to the post of Professor of the Public Understanding of Science, and she delivered her inaugural lecture, "The Trouble With Kids", in March the following year.

In 2009, Byron was awarded an honorary doctorate by the University of York.

Byron is the patron of Prospex, a charity which works with young people in north London. She is also a partner in a media company, Doris Partnership.

== Personal life ==
Tanya Sichel married The Bill actor Bruce Byron in Barnet, London, in 1997. They have a daughter (born 1995, Hendon, London) and a son (born 1998, Barnet). Tanya and Bruce met when Bruce applied to the very first ARTTS course.

== Television ==
=== Little Angels ===
Tanya Byron, Stephen Briers, Rachel Morris and Laverne Antrobus became household names working on the British TV show Little Angels (which ran for three series), a docu-soap that follows the lives of families where the children have behavioural problems that are causing the parents difficulty. The show is seen as a 'life line' by the parents who are effectively calling professionals with years of experience of working with children and families to help them fix a problem that they believe beyond their ability to fix. Tanya Byron, Stephen Briers, Rachel Morris and Laverne Antrobus, monitor the behaviour of the family and the children before discussing with the parents the real underlying causes of the problem (which are nearly always in some way either caused by or contributed to by the parents themselves – usually by inadvertently rewarding inappropriate behaviour with their attention). They then discuss a course of action with them and later they coach them in how to change their own and their children's behaviour to improve the situation (this is frequently done in scenes where the family is filmed doing something together with the parents receiving advice from the attending professional via an ear piece). The show is intended to be instructive to viewers in how to deal with common problems as well as of real help to the family being filmed (and of course entertaining).

=== The House of Tiny Tearaways ===
In 2005 Tanya began to host her own show called The House of Tiny Tearaways, a reality TV style show that brings three families experiencing problems into a large, purpose-built house where they are monitored and aided for a week. The show is vaguely similar to programmes like Big Brother, in that all the rooms have cameras in them and the families are frequently monitored in their activities with the audience shown highlights of a particular day. Each family stays in the house for six days in which time Tanya monitors them all for one day before having very honest and direct discussions with the parents about the issues and how they can be dealt with, and then guiding the families through courses of action, exercises and deliberate changes of behaviour on the parents' side to deal with the problems. Tanya does not do this entirely singlehandedly, as one element of the programme is the support the parents receive from the other families who are in the house with them at the same time.

The show is characterised by: scenes of children misbehaving, therapy sessions between Tanya and the parents of the children (which are often very emotional and are sometimes the first time they've ever really discussed the problems they're facing), tasks in and outside the house which the families are set to help them practice the skills they've learnt (often having to do things they would normally find difficult, like take a child with eating problems to a restaurant) and by the ending, the families review any improvements or shortcomings they've made.

In 2007, Byron stated that she did not want to make any more television programmes on parenting as it had become "a well-marketed area".

=== Am I Normal? ===
In 2008 Tanya presented a four-part series called Am I Normal? exploring the boundaries of acceptable behaviour. The episodes explore the themes of addiction, faith, sex and body image. The programme presents both behaviours and treatments which Dr Byron is able to explore objectively but with some common sense cynicism. Is having sex with 5000 men within the range of normal behaviour? Is being attracted to pre-pubescent girls okay if you don't act on that attraction in a way that harms or coerces them? Are sex addiction or addiction to computer games real physiological addictions? Is hearing God different to hearing voices? These are the questions that she explores, without yielding to the temptation to give easy answers. This was based on the radio series presented by Vivienne Parry.

== Radio ==
In October 2013, Byron was the guest for BBC Radio 4's Desert Island Discs. Her choices were "Absolute Beginners" by David Bowie, Baba O'Riley by The Who, Take Five by Dave Brubeck, "I Want That Man" by Debbie Harry, Perhaps, Perhaps, Perhaps by Doris Day, Uncertain Smile by The The, Canon in D Major by Johann Pachelbel and That's Life by Frank Sinatra.

In 2020, Byron presented "Word of Mouth", on BBC Radio Four, featuring an investigation into the benefits of talking to strangers. Previously, she presented All in the Mind, a BBC magazine radio programme about psychology and psychiatry.

Academic offices
Preceded by New position	Chancellor of Edge Hill University; 2008–present	Succeeded by Incumbent
