= Deborah Bowman =

Deborah Bowman may refer to:

- Debbie Bowman-Sullivan (born 1963), Australian former field hockey defender
- Deborah Bowman (ethicist), British professor of ethics and law
