= Moses B. Cotsworth =

British accountant and calendar reformer

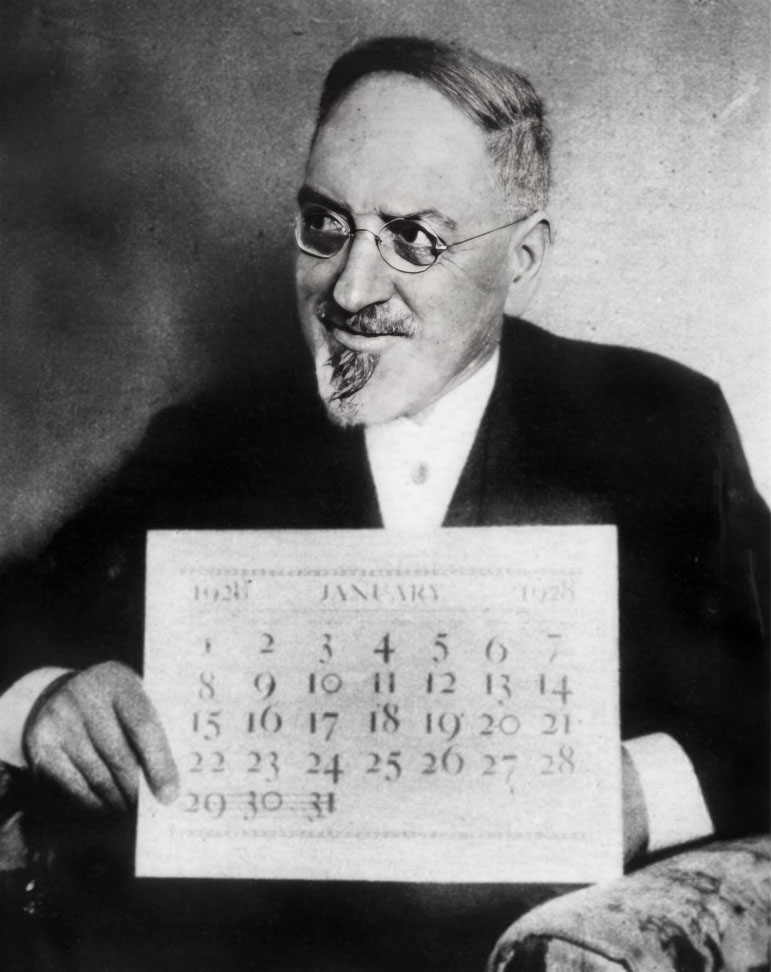
Cotsworth holding a 1928 calendar

Moses Bruines Cotsworth (3 December 1859, Willitoft, East Yorkshire – 4 June 1943, Vancouver, British Columbia) was a British accountant, statistician, and calendar reformer. After emigrating to Canada he worked for the British Columbia provincial government and chaired the Civil Service Reform committee.

== Early life ==
Cotsworth was born in Willitoft on 3 December 1859. He was the only child of Sarah Bruines and George Cotsworth, an agricultural labourer. George and Sarah had married on 24 December 1858. George died on 22 November 1861 when Cotsworth was only 23 months old. Cotsworth was raised by his maternal grandparents while his mother worked as a domestic cook in York.

== School and work ==
In 1870, Cotsworth became a pupil at the Blue Coat School, York. He left there in 1873 to take a position as a junior clerk at the North Eastern Railway (United Kingdom). After employment in Derbyshire and Nottinghamshire he returned to the railway's new statistics office and quickly became recognised as a skilled statistician. He wrote a series of books on railway rates following the Railway and Canal Traffic Act, 1888, as well as the Direct Calculator; a book of calculation tables.

== Personal life ==
Cotsworth married Kezia Gardiner, on 25 September 1884, at the St Saviourgate Unitarian Chapel, in York. They had six children, Edith who died in infancy, Daisy, Grace, Lena (founder of the York House School, Vancouver), Frank and Olive. They lived in Holgate near York before emigrating to New Westminster, British Columbia in 1910. Kezia died in Vancouver in 1929.

== Calendar reform ==
Cotsworth's interest in calendar reform began around 1894 when he was working at the North Eastern Railway (United Kingdom). He found that monthly accounting was greatly complicated by the fact that months did not divide evenly into weeks. Railway statistics could not be directly compared across different months as some contained four weekends and some five, while the number of working days varied even between months of the same length.

After considerable research which included travelling around Britain to investigate ancient sites such as Stonehenge and Silbury Hill as well as a trip to Egypt, he devised what is now known as the International Fixed Calendar, a solar calendar in which each of the 13 months has 28 days and four weekends. He later named the calendar the Yearal. The 13th month was named Sol and was placed between June and July.

13 months of 28 days totalled 364 days so he also hoped to introduce the 365th intercalary day as a global holiday. This extra day would not have a weekday-name so that in all subsequent years the same day would fall on the same date. In 1905 Cotsworth self-published The Rational Almanac to explain his theories.

In 1912, he founded the International Almanak Reform League with Sir Sandford Fleming as honorary president. This organisation was relaunched in 1922 as the International Fixed Calendar League in an effort to gain adoption of his calendar by businesses and governments worldwide. In 1925 Cotsworth met American entrepreneur George Eastman (1854 - 1932) who supported the plan and became its financial backer until his death. Eastman was also appointed president of the International Fixed Calendar League. The 13-month calendar was adopted by the Eastman Kodak Company, where it was used from 1928 to 1982.

Cotsworth travelled to over 50 countries to promote his calendar. He also wrote many pamphlets and, in 1914, The "Fixed" Yearal. His publicity campaign was rewarded by an international conference on calendar reform at the League of Nations in October 1931. His calendar was one of the two main contenders. The other being the World Calendar championed by Elisabeth Achelis. The conference did not choose a new calendar but decided that further publicity was required which Cotsworth and Achelis undertook.

Public interest in calendar reform waned after the 1931 conference and, although both reformers continued to campaign, due to the developing hostilities before and during World War II the idea was not taken up. Cotsworth retired from the campaign in 1938.

== Egypt ==
Cotsworth travelled to Egypt in 1900. He hoped to measure pyramids there to ascertain whether his theory that they were ancient sundials was correct. While there he travelled with George Frederick Wright (1838 - 1921) who was to become a close friend, and with Mrs Mabel Bent (1847 - 1929), widow of explorer James Theodore Bent (1852 - 1897). Cotsworth and Wright were on hand to rescue Mrs Bent when she broke her leg on the way to Bethlehem just before Christmas 1900.

As a result of his Egyptian travels Cotsworth proposed the theory of continental drift. He was also the first to suggest spiral ramps for the construction of the Great Pyramid of Cheops.

== Political Life in Canada ==
Cotsworth journeyed to Canada in 1908 following his dismissal from the North Eastern Railway (United Kingdom). He had helped to found a trade union to argue for workers' pensions and better conditions but, as a result, was sacked by his employer.

While in British Columbia he met Premier Richard McBride and William John Bowser and was appointed to the chair of the provincial civil service regrading commission. Cotsworth carried out his work zealously which brought him into conflict with the government. In 1915 Cotsworth, with the help of the Ministerial Union of the Lower Mainland of B.C., published a damning critique of the administration in a pamphlet called The Crisis in B.C.: An Appeal for Investigation.

== Later life ==
Cotsworth spent much of his time travelling the world promoting his Yearal calendar between 1922 and 1938. He established an office in London and regularly journeyed to Europe. He retired home to Vancouver in 1938 to live with his daughter, Olive.

Moses Cotsworth suffered a stroke and died on 4 June 1943, in Vancouver.

== Legacy and Honours ==
Cotsworth was elected as a Fellow of the Institute of Chartered Accountants, of the Royal Statistical Society, and of the Geological Society.

== Bibliography ==
- Inventory of the Moses Bruine Cotsworth Fonds at the Library of the University of British Columbia (2000)
- Cook, Anna J (2024). A Man Beyond Time: Moses Cotsworth's fight for the 13-month calendar. Independent Publishing Network. ISBN 9781805177203.
