= Willitoft =

Hamlet in the East Riding of Yorkshire, England

Coordinates: 53.805090°N 0.872276°W

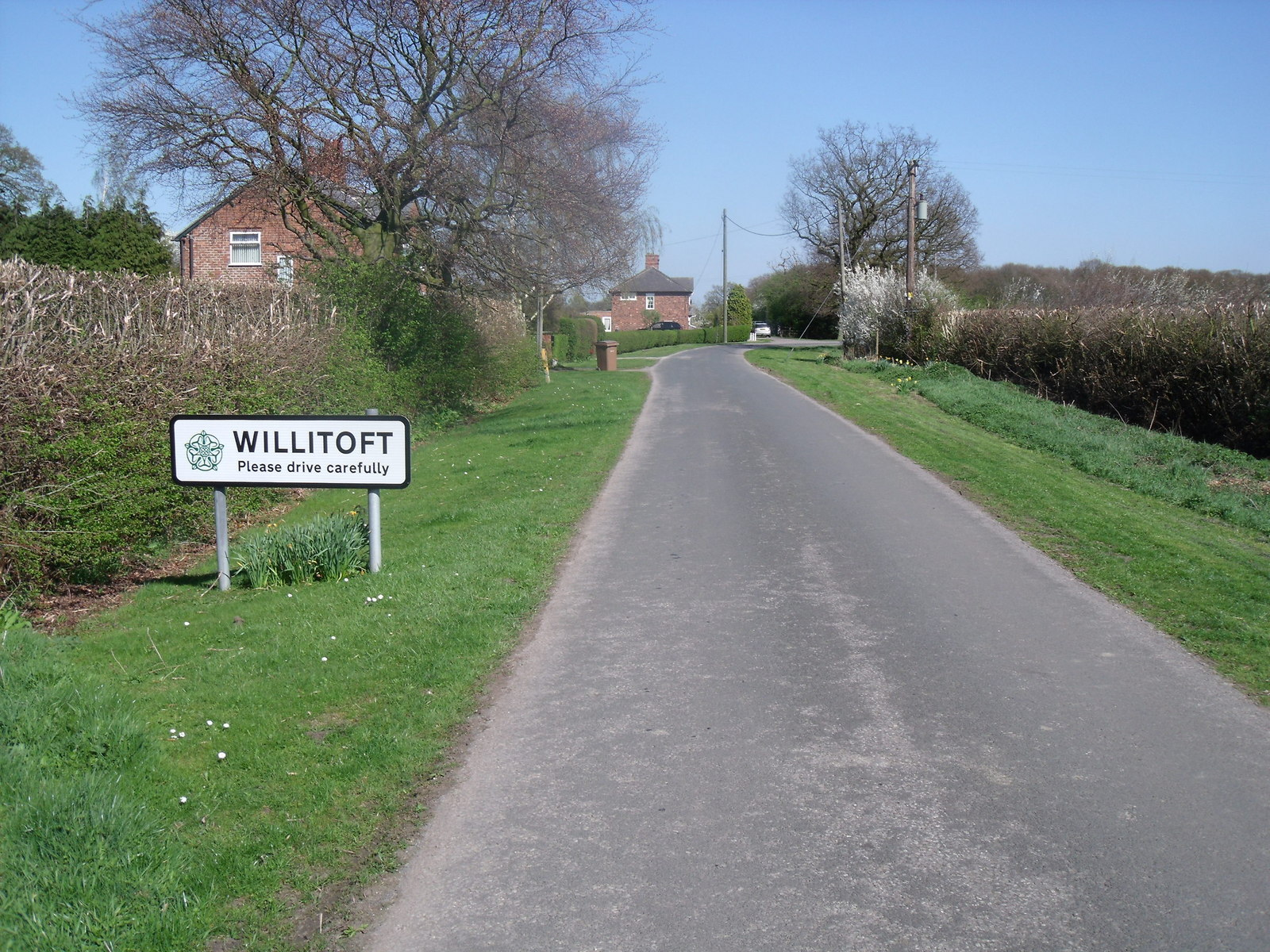
- Entering Willitoft

- Location within the East Riding of Yorkshire
- OS grid reference: SE743349
- Civil parish: Bubwith
- Unitary authority: East Riding of Yorkshire
- Ceremonial county: East Riding of Yorkshire
- Region: Yorkshire and the Humber
- Country: England
- Sovereign state: United Kingdom
- Post town: GOOLE
- Postcode district: DN14
- Dialling code: 01757
- Police: Humberside
- Fire: Humberside
- Ambulance: Yorkshire
- UK Parliament: Goole and Pocklington

Willitoft is a hamlet and former civil parish, now in the parish of Bubwith, in the East Riding of Yorkshire, England. It is situated just south of the A163 road and west of the B1228 road. It is approximately 8 miles (13 km) east of Selby and 7 miles (11 km) north of Goole. In 1931 the parish had a population of 53.

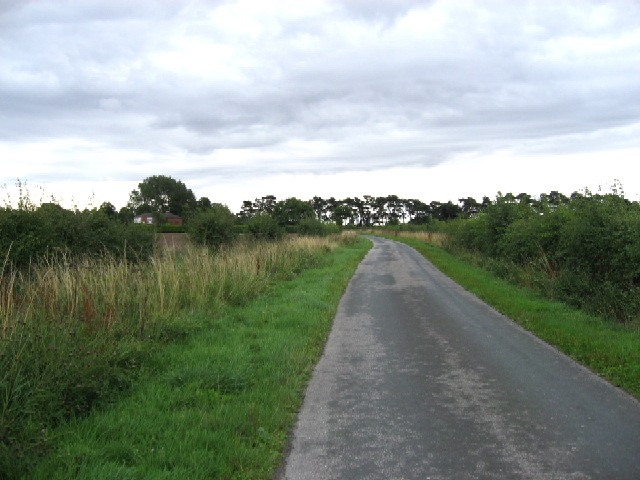
On the Howden 20 long-distance footpath, approaching Willitoft

The name Willitoft derives from the Old English wilig meaning 'willow', and the Old Norse topt meaning 'curtilage'.

Willitoft was the birthplace, in 1859, of Moses B. Cotsworth, inventor of the International Fixed Calendar and 13-month calendar reformer. He later emigrated to Vancouver where he acted as an advisor to the British Columbia provincial government, under Sir Richard McBride. Cotsworth died in Vancouver in 1943.

== Governance ==
Willitoft was formerly a township in the parish of Bubwith, in 1866 Willitoft became a civil parish, on 1 April 1935 the parish was abolished and merged with Bubwith.
