= Little Angels (TV series) =

2004 British reality television show

- Genre: Reality television
- Starring: Tanya Byron; Stephen Briers; Rachel Morris; Laverne Antrobus
- Country of origin: United Kingdom
- Original language: English
- No. of series: 5, 2 (teen)

Production
- Executive producers: Sacha Baveystock; Helen Shariatmadari
- Running time: 30 minutes 60 minutes (special and teen version)

Original release
- Network: BBC Three
- Release: 9 February 2004 – 13 October 2005

Related
- The House of Tiny Tearaways; Little Angels: Top Tips; Teen Angels (2005–06)

Little Angels is a BAFTA-nominated British reality television show which ran for five series on BBC Three from February 2004 to October 2005.

== Format ==
The series, in the docu-soap genre, aimed to show parents how to overcome common behavioural problems in their children, using a team of experts who observed and gave advice. The format of each programme involved experts monitoring the behaviour of the family and the children, before discussing with the parents the real underlying causes of the problem, which frequently involved the parents themselves. The experts then discussed a course of action with the parents, later coaching them on how to change their own and their children's behaviour to improve the situation. This was frequently achieved in scenes where the family was filmed in a communal activity, with the parents receiving advice from the attending professional via an ear piece. In addition to its entertainment value, Little Angels gave viewers strategies to deal with common problems, and offered real help to the family being filmed.

== Reception ==
Little Angels was the first in a series of reality television programmes to focus on parenting, with successors including The House of Tiny Tearaways. Considered among the strongest of BBC Three's programmes by Stuart Murphy, then the channel's controller, it was praised for reflecting "real day to day issues" in a government-commissioned report on the channel. Little Angels was nominated for a Bafta award in 2005. It was in 2005 that its most famous parent, Welsh actress Jynine James took part in the series with her 6-year-old son Harrison. The show's experts, Tanya Byron, Stephen Briers, Rachel Morris and Laverne Antrobus, became household names.

== Transmissions ==
=== Main series ===
Series	Start date	End date	Episodes
1	9 February 2004	16 February 2004	4
2	7 September 2004	16 September 2004	8
3	12 October 2004	11 November 2004	8
3	26 November 2004	4 December 2004	8
4	14 June 2005	18 July 2005	8
5	20 September 2005	13 October 2005	8

- Little Angels Xmas Special: broadcast 20 December 2004

=== Teen Angels ===
Teen Terrors to Teen Angels in 2006

Series	Start date	End date	Episodes
1	14 March 2005	21 April 2005	6
2	29 May 2006	26 June 2006	5

== Tie-in book ==
A book based on the series was published by the BBC in 2005, co-written by Tanya Byron and the show's executive producer, Sacha Baveystock.
