= Inside the Ethics Committee =

- Genre: Discussion of real life cases facing clinical ethics committees
- Country of origin: United Kingdom
- Language: English
- Home station: BBC Radio 4
- Hosted by: Vivienne Parry
- Website: www.bbc.co.uk/programmes/b007xbtd

Inside the Ethics Committee is a BBC Radio 4 programme, now in its ninth series, presented by Vivienne Parry. Each episode is a discussion of a real life case facing a clinical ethics committee.

== Notable guests ==
- Deborah Bowman, Professor of Ethics and Law at St George's, University of London
