= Bubwith =

Village and civil parish in the East Riding of Yorkshire, England

Coordinates: 53.818070°N 0.919274°W

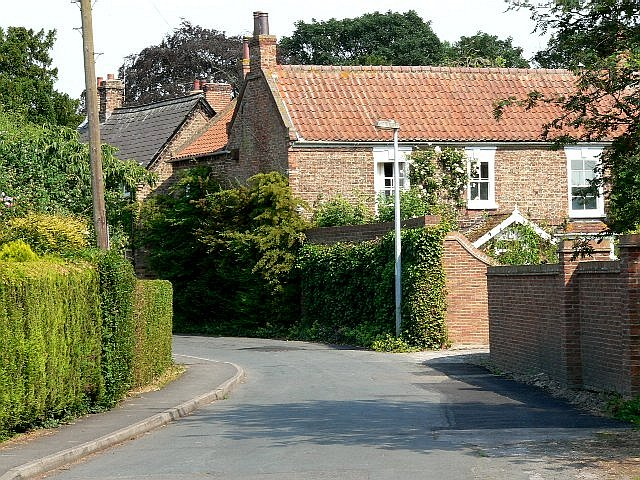
- Church Street, Bubwith

- Location within the East Riding of Yorkshire
- Population: 1,225 (2011 census)
- OS grid reference: SE711363
  - London: 165 mi (266 km) S
- Civil parish: Bubwith
- Unitary authority: East Riding of Yorkshire
- Ceremonial county: East Riding of Yorkshire
- Region: Yorkshire and the Humber
- Country: England
- Sovereign state: United Kingdom
- Post town: SELBY
- Postcode district: YO8
- Dialling code: 01757
- Police: Humberside
- Fire: Humberside
- Ambulance: Yorkshire
- UK Parliament: Goole and Pocklington

Bubwith is a village and civil parish in the East Riding of Yorkshire, England. The village is situated about 6 miles (10 km) north-east of Selby, and 12 miles (19 km) south-east of York. It is situated on the east bank of the River Derwent, west of which is the county of North Yorkshire. It lies between Selby and Market Weighton on the A163 road.

The civil parish is formed by the villages of Bubwith and Breighton and the hamlets of Gunby and Willitoft. According to the 2011 UK census, Bubwith parish had a population of 1,225, an increase on the 2001 UK census figure of 1,104.

== History ==
The ancient parish of Bubwith also covers the village of Breighton and the hamlets of Gunby and Willitoft, but its location on and crossing over the River Derwent led to its becoming the largest settlement in the area.

The village's name means Bubba's wood, Bubba being a Scandinavian male name. It is listed as "Bobewyth" in the 11th-century accounts of Selby Abbey.

In Domesday Book (1086) Bubwith is written as "Bubuid". Before the Conquest, lordship was held by Alwin and Ketil; after, Gilbert Tison became tenant-in-chief.

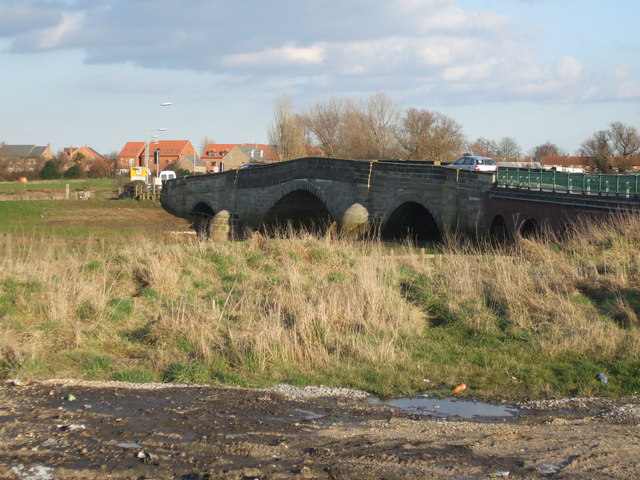
Derwent Bridge, Bubwith

Though there has been a recorded river crossing since at least the year 1200, the present bridge over the Derwent, consisting of three limestone arches and several flood arches, replaced a "dangerous and inconvenient" ferry service when it was built in 1798, following authorisation by the Bubwith Bridge Act 1793 (33 Geo. 3. c. 106). Crossing the bridge required a toll until 1936, with the original costs amounting to three shilling for six horses, and 10 pence for twenty head of oxen. Certain vehicles, such as funeral processions, were exempt from the toll.

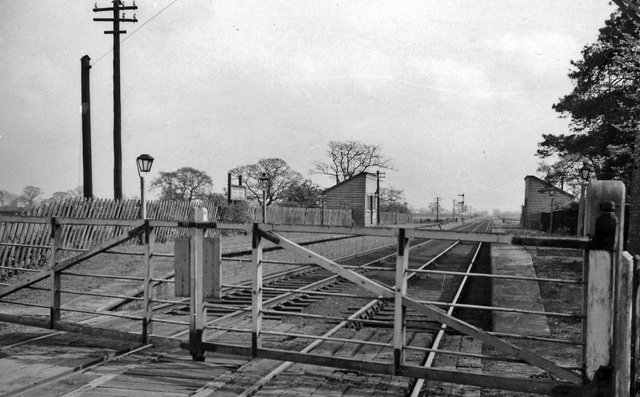
The former railway station in 1961

The railways reached the village in 1848, and Bubwith had its own station on the Selby to Driffield Line. It closed to passengers in 1954.

Breighton was also used as the site of an airfield for Halifax, Wellington and Lancaster bombers during the Second World War.

The village was the home of ARTTS International, the film and television training centre established by John Sichel, until it closed in 2005.

The Bubwith telephone exchange has been ADSL enabled since July 2005, and became ADSL Max enabled in March 2006. It has also been enabled for 21CN, and has been accepting orders for FTTC BT Infinity since December 2013

In the mid 1970s Bubwith was the location where John Hemmens ran his model steam business operating from one of the Breighton aerodrome Nissen huts. The models are highly regarded by steam enthusiasts.

== Community ==
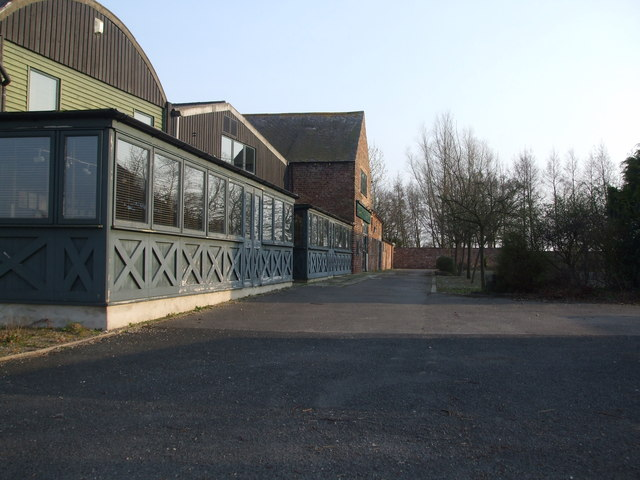
Former Arts theatre

Elementary education is provided by Bubwith Community Primary School, and The Bubwith Centre, which hosts Bubwith Playgroup. To the rear of the centre are playing fields.

All Saints' Church, Bubwith dates from the 12th century and is built in white Tadcaster stone. Some Norman stonework remains, but the structure dates mainly from the 13th to 15th centuries. It was restored in 1894-5 by C. Hodgson Fowler and Ewan Christian. The church was designated a Grade I listed building in 1960 and is now recorded in the National Heritage List for England, maintained by Historic England.

There are 6 acres (2.4 ha) of playing fields for the local cricket club and three local football clubs. The site holds three tennis courts used by the Bubwith Tennis Club. There is a licensed bar, and sports hall that runs events and weekly classes in Zumba, Tai Chi, Boxfit and Salsa. The Cyril Wiles Room is used for Pilates and Yoga and the daily Bubwith 'Under fives'. The Centre is also used by the local community for private parties and the Youth Club.

Village amenities include an off-licence with delicatessen, The White Swan public house, a store, an Indian restaurant, award-winning butchers J A Mounfield & Son and a hairdressers.

== See also ==
- Listed buildings in Bubwith
