= Listed buildings in Bubwith =

Bubwith is a civil parish in the county of the East Riding of Yorkshire, England. It contains 14 listed buildings that are recorded in the National Heritage List for England. Of these, one is listed at Grade I, the highest of the three grades, and the others are at Grade II, the lowest grade. The parish contains the villages of Bubwith and Breighton and the surrounding countryside. Most of the listed buildings are houses, farmhouses and farm buildings, and the others consist of a church and a bridge.

== Key ==
Grade	Criteria
I	Buildings of exceptional interest, sometimes considered to be internationally important
II	Buildings of national importance and special interest

== Buildings ==
Name and location	Photograph	Date	Notes	Grade
All Saints' Church; 53.81703°N 0.92058°W		Late 12th century	The church has been extended and altered through the centuries, including a restoration in 1894–95 by C. Hodgson Fowler and Ewan Christian. It is built in limestone with a Westmorland slate roof, and consists of a nave with a clerestory, north and south aisles, a chancel and a west tower. The tower has two stages, diagonal buttresses, a three-light west window, a string course, two-light pointed bell openings with hood moulds, and an embattled parapet with eight crocketed pinnacles. The nave also has an embattled parapet.	I
Tress Cottage; 53.81895°N 0.92008°W	—	Early 18th century	The house is in whitewashed brick, with a dentilled eaves course, and a pantile roof with coped gables and shaped kneelers. There is one storey and an attic, a double depth plan, and four bays. On the front is a doorway and sash windows, all under segmental arches.	II
White House; 53.81856°N 0.92169°W	—	Early 18th century	The house is in whitewashed brick, with a dentilled eaves course, and a pantile roof with raised gable ends. There is one storey and an attic, and three bays. On the front is a lattice porch, and sash windows with wedge lintels.	II
43 and 45 Main Street; 53.81838°N 0.91592°W		Mid-18th century	A pair of houses in brick, with dark red brick quoins, a three-course floor band, a dentilled eaves course, and a pantile roof. There are two storeys and four bays. The doorway in the second bay has a three-light rectangular fanlight, and on the right bay is a canted bay window. The other windows are sashes, those on the upper floor with gauged brick flat arches.	II
Frog Hall Farmhouse; 53.80038°N 0.92677°W	—	Mid-18th century	The farmhouse is in red brick, with a brick dentilled cornice, and a pantile roof with raised gables and kneelers. There are two storeys and an L-shaped plan, with an east front of three bays. The central doorway has a fanlight, and the windows are sashes. At the rear are two lean-tos, one with two storeys, the other with one, containing a variety of windows.	II
Gunby Hall; 53.80919°N 0.92320°W		Mid-18th century	The house is in brick, with stone dressings, a floor band, an eaves band, and a Welsh slate roof with raised and tumbled-in gable ends. There are two storeys, three bays, and two rear cross-wings. The central doorway has a divided fanlight, and the windows are sashes, those on the ground floor with channelled wedge lintels and fluted keystones, and those on the upper floor with soldier arches.	II
Chain Bar House; 53.81862°N 0.91681°W		Late 18th century	The house is in brick, with dark red brick dressings, quoins, a floor band, dentilled eaves and a pantile roof with coped gables and shaped kneelers. There are two storeys and four bays. The central doorway has fluted pilasters, a radial fanlight, a moulded archivolt paterae in the spandrels, and a pediment with a plaque and swags in the tympanum. The windows are sashes with quoined jambs under segmental arches.	II
Barn and stables to rear of Chain Bar House; 53.81881°N 0.91667°W	—	Late 18th century	The barn on the left, and the stables with hayloft above to the right, are in brick with a pantile roof. The barn has three bays, the middle bay projecting slightly. It contains board doors, a stable door, two rows of vents, and pitching doors. The stables have a board door, a stable door, and slatted openings on the upper floor. All the stable openings are under segmental arches.	II
Old Brewery House; 53.81787°N 0.92158°W		Late 18th century	The house is in brick, with a bracketed eaves cornice, and a pantile roof with coped gables and kneelers. There are two storeys, three bays, and a rear wing on the right. The central doorway has pilasters with palm leaf capitals, a decorative segmental fanlight, a frieze with festoons and fleur-de-lys, and a modillion pediment with a central fleur-de-lys. The windows are sashes with flat rubbed brick arches, those on the ground floor with side lights. The rear wing has sash windows, some horizontally sliding.	II
Mulberry House; 53.81734°N 0.91714°W		1783	The house is in brick on a plinth, with a hipped pantile roof. There are two storeys and three bays. The central doorway has pilasters, a radial fanlight and an open pediment, above which is a date plaque. The windows are sashes with rubbed flat brick aches, those on the ground floor with shutters.	II
Derwent Bridge; 53.81934°N 0.92705°W		1793	The bridge carries the A163 road over the River Derwent. It is in stone, and consists of three stepped segmental arches. The bridge has round cutwaters, flat buttresses, and a coped four-course parapet.	II
Stables with dovecote, Gunby Hall; 53.80907°N 0.92388°W	—	Late 18th or early 19th century	The stables with a dovecote and a hayloft above are in brick, and have a pantile roof with coped gables. There are two storeys and three bays. On the ground floor are three stable doors, the outer ones with segmental heads, the middle one with a lintel. The upper floor has pointed openings, the middle one with pigeon openings. Stone steps on the right gable end lead up to the hayloft, and on the left gable end is a weathervane with a fox.	II
Lindum House; 53.81878°N 0.91809°W	—	Late 18th or early 19th century	The house is in brick, with a stepped eaves course, and a Roman tile roof. There are two storeys and three bays. The central doorway has pilasters with sunken panels containing festoons, a semicircular fanlight with radial glazing, and an open pediment with a swag in the tympanum. This is flanked by tripartite bow windows on plinths, with pilasters containing swags, and a frieze with relief paterae. On the centre of the upper floor is a false window, and the outer bays contain sash windows.	II
Shed with hayloft, Gunby Hall; 53.80923°N 0.92406°W	—	Early 19th century	The building is in brick, and has a pantile roof with coped gables and shaped kneelers. There are two storeys and four bays. On the ground floor are four elliptical arches, and above are slatted openings and a pitching door. On the left side are stone steps leading up to the hayloft.	II
