= ARTTS International =

Coordinates: 53.822640°N 0.905925°W

ARTTS International was a multi-discipline film, television, radio and stage training centre in Bubwith, East Riding of Yorkshire, England established by John Sichel in 1990. The centre ran for 15 years until his death in 2005, during which time over 500 students trained there, most of whom have since found work in the entertainment industry.

== History ==
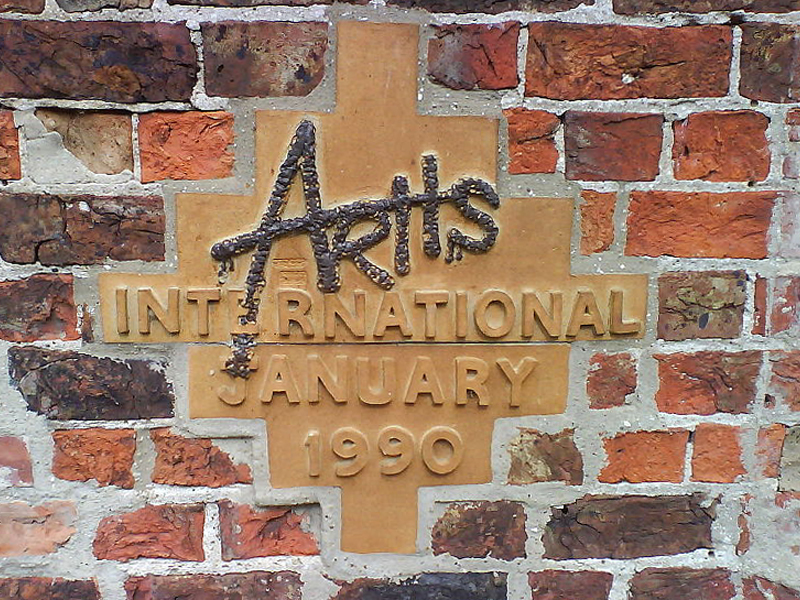
The ARTTS International Plaque

Founder John Sichel had worked for many years as a producer with the BBC and ATV. In 1989, Sichel received a loan of £170,000 from the Rural Development Commission to convert Highfield Grange, a disused pig farm, into a professional television, film, theatre and radio training facility. His idea was that learning should be by doing, rather than reading. The centre also offered management training workshops for organisations outside the arts to learn team work while making a film.

"ARTTS" was an acronym for Advanced Residential Theatre & Television Skillcentre". It was designed for trainees to live and learn together in a professional environment. It offered Foundation and Advanced one-year fee-paying courses with hands-on training in acting, directing, scriptwriting and technical skills in theatre, television, film and radio, as well as two and four-week residential courses for those already working in the industry who wanted to extend their skills.

ARTTS opened on 6 January 1990. 22 students graduated from the first year. One of these trainees, Geoffrey Bicker, went on to become ARTTS Technical Director for over 10 years. During its years of operation, ARTTS had around 50 trainees a year from all over the world.

Its on site training contained a 200-seat theatre and a cabaret theatre, a television studio, control room and editing suite, a radio studio, sound recording studio and full location equipment for television and 16mm and 35mm film, plus costume and scenery workshops. With an emphasis on the personal as well as the professional, trainees were pushed to learn the essentials of how to keep and maintain a job and reputation as someone continually employable whilst nurturing their creativity and remaining enthusiastic.

ARTTS trainees presented plays locally by writers such as Shakespeare, Lorca and Orton. They also mounted productions at the Edinburgh Festival Fringe of plays they had written, acted and directed during their courses. In 1994, ARTTS International won a Fringe First award for When The Cradle Falls.

On 5 April 2005, John Sichel died. Despite attempts to continue his legacy, spearheaded by his widow (and co-founder of ARTTS International) Elfie, and their daughters Katrina Sichel and Tanya Byron, with former graduates Derek Donohoe and Geoffrey Bicker, ARTTS closed down six months later. Donohoe and Bicker went on to form AON Productions, continuing the corporate video work of ARTTS Productions.

The site was restored to a usable state and was the base for GSP Studios, a small film company based in Yorkshire, from 2011 to 2024.

== Notable trainees ==
- Bruce Byron – Acting (United Kingdom) (1990)
- Adrian Pang – Acting (Singapore) (1992)
- Jon Sen – Directing (United Kingdom) (1996)
- Sally El Hosaini – Directing (Egypt / United Kingdom) (2000)
- Hope McIntyre

== Notable trainers ==
- Arnold Peters (Radio Acting)
- Edward Petherbridge (Acting)
- John Sichel
- Toby Swift

=== Original plays at the Edinburgh Festival Fringe ===
Year	Title	Author	Theatre	Cast	Notes
1991	Lady Macsescu		Pleasance		Colin George, director
1993	Dividing Lines		Pleasance Attic	Oriana Bonet, Roderick Cameron	
1994	When The Cradle Falls	Lucy Thompson and Paul James	Pleasance, Edinburgh	Lucy Thompson	Fringe First winner
1995	Cry for Innocence	Dario Pleić (co-author)	Pleasance Attic		
1996	The Confession	Jon Sen	Pleasance Attic	Jerome Tait, Jon Sen, Mike Montgomery, Rachel Parker, Alex McCartney, James Smith	
1997	Forces of Peace		Pleasance		
1998	Bi Now Pay Later		Pleasance, Edinburgh	David Mildon, Alex Woodhall, Nicola Tamplin	
1999	The Day of Atonement		Pleasance		
2000	Balls	Heather Macdonald and Nadia Shash	Pleasance Cavern		
2001	Nowhere Fast	Rob Murphy	Pleasance Upstairs		
2001	Not Guilty?	Fiona Carrick and Toby Bowman	Pleasance Cavern	Toby Bowman	
2002	Gimme All You Got!		Pleasance Courtyard		
2002	Cleansing		Pleasance Courtyard		
