= List of Thor DM-18A launches =

The Thor DM-18A was an American suborbital launch vehicle. It flew 50 times. It had 6 failures, 3 partial failures, and 41 successes. It had an 82% launch reliability. Its first flight attempt was on 5 November 1958. Its first successful launch was on 16 December 1958. Its last launch was on 19 June 1962. The Thor DM-18A was evolved from the Thor DM-18, the first Thor rocket. Thor DM-18A was the first operational finless variant of the original missile.

== Launch history ==
The data in this table comes from
Date/Time (UTC)	Rocket	S/N	Launch site	Payload	Function	Orbit	Outcome	Remarks
1958-11-05; 08:53	Thor DM-18A	Thor 138	CCAFS LC-17B		Missile test	Suborbital	Failure	Maiden flight of Thor DM-18A. Flight control failure. RSO T+45 seconds.
1958-11-26; 09:09	Thor DM-18A	Thor 140	CCAFS LC-17B		Missile test	Suborbital	Partial failure	Loss of guidance system power caused the missile to overshoot its target point by 22 miles.
1958-12-06; 00:41	Thor DM-18A	Thor 145	CCAFS LC-18B		Missile test	Suborbital	Partial failure	LOX tank pressurization failure led to loss of thrust. Missile impacted 20 miles short of the target point.
1958-12-16; 23:44:45	Thor DM-18A	Thor 151	VAFB LC-75-1-1		Missile test	Suborbital	Success	First Thor launch from Vandenberg AFB
1958-12-17; 04:00	Thor DM-18A	Thor 146	CCAFS LC-17B		Missile test	Suborbital	Success	
1958-12-31; 02:00	Thor DM-18A	Thor 138	CCAFS LC-18B		Missile test	Suborbital	Failure	Flight control failure. RSO T+40 seconds.
1959-01-30; 23:53	Thor DM-18A	Thor 154	CCAFS LC-17B		Missile test	Suborbital	Success	
1959-03-22; 00:58	Thor DM-18A	Thor 158	CCAFS LC-18B		Missile test	Suborbital	Success	
1959-03-27; 04:02	Thor DM-18A	Thor 162	CCAFS LC-17B		Missile test	Suborbital	Success	
1959-04-16; 20:46	Thor DM-18A	Thor 161	VAFB LC-75-2-8		Missile test	Suborbital	Success	
1959-04-23; 05:30	Thor DM-18A	Thor 176	CCAFS LC-17B		Missile test	Suborbital	Success	
1959-04-25; 05:00	Thor DM-18A	Thor 164	CCAFS LC-18B		Missile test	Suborbital	Success	
1959-05-12; 17:35	Thor DM-18A	Thor 187	CCAFS LC-17B		Missile test	Suborbital	Success	
1959-05-23; 02:42	Thor DM-18A	Thor 184	CCAFS LC-18B		Missile test	Suborbital	Success	
1959-06-16; 21:45	Thor DM-18A	Thor 191	VAFB LC-75-2-7		Missile test	Suborbital	Failure	Pitch and roll program failed to initiate. RSO T+50 seconds.
1959-06-26	Thor DM-18A	Thor 198	CCAFS LC-18B		Missile test	Suborbital	Success	
1959-06-30; 02:37	Thor DM-18A	Thor 194	CCAFS LC-17B		Missile test	Suborbital	Success	
1959-07-21; 07:33	Thor DM-18A	Thor 203	CCAFS LC-17B		Missile test	Suborbital	Failure	Pitch and roll program failed to initiate. RSO T+40 seconds.
1959-07-24; 12:47	Thor DM-18A	Thor 202	CCAFS LC-18B		Missile test	Suborbital	Success	
1959-08-03; 21:41	Thor DM-18A	Thor 175	VAFB LC-75-1-1		Missile test	Suborbital	Success	
1959-08-06; 02:48	Thor DM-18A	Thor 208	CCAFS LC-17B		Missile test	Suborbital	Success	
1959-08-14; 09:00	Thor DM-18A	Thor 204	CCAFS LC-18B		Missile test	Suborbital	Success	
1959-08-14; 19:36:04	Thor DM-18A	Thor 190	VAFB LC-75-2-6		Missile test	Suborbital	Partial failure	Premature propellant depletion. Planned range not achieved.
1959-08-27; 12:30	Thor DM-18A	Thor 216	CCAFS LC-17B		Missile test	Suborbital	Success	
1959-09-12	Thor DM-18A	Thor 217	CCAFS LC-18B		Missile test	Suborbital	Success	
1959-09-17; 21:09	Thor DM-18A	Thor 228	VAFB LC-75-1-2		Missile test	Suborbital	Success	
1959-09-22; 18:00	Thor DM-18A	Thor 222	CCAFS LC-17B		Missile test	Suborbital	Success	
1959-10-06; 16:41	Thor DM-18A	Thor 235	CCAFS LC-18B		Missile test	Suborbital	Success	
1959-10-06; 18:26	Thor DM-18A	Thor 239	VAFB LC-75-2-8		Missile test	Suborbital	Success	
1959-10-14; 04:15	Thor DM-18A	Thor 221	CCAFS LC-17B		Missile test	Suborbital	Success	
1959-10-21; 22:57	Thor DM-18A	Thor 220	VAFB LC-75-1-1		Missile test	Suborbital	Success	
1959-10-29; 02:12	Thor DM-18A	Thor 230	CCAFS LC-18B		Missile test	Suborbital	Success	
1959-11-03	Thor DM-18A	Thor 238	CCAFS LC-17B		Missile test	Suborbital	Success	
1959-11-12; 19:24	Thor DM-18A	Thor 181	VAFB LC-75-1-2		Missile test	Suborbital	Success	
1959-11-19	Thor DM-18A	Thor 244	CCAFS LC-17B		Missile test	Suborbital	Success	
1959-12-01; 17:00	Thor DM-18A	Thor 254	CCAFS LC-18B		Missile test	Suborbital	Success	
1959-12-02; 05:29	Thor DM-18A	Thor 265	VAFB LC-75-1-1		Missile test	Suborbital	Failure	
1959-12-15; 02:14	Thor DM-18A	Thor 185	VAFB LC-75-1-2		Missile test	Suborbital	Failure	Flight control failure. Missile broke up T+60 seconds.
1959-12-17	Thor DM-18A	Thor 255	CCAFS LC-17B		Missile test	Suborbital	Success	
1960-01-21; 20:10	Thor DM-18A	Thor 215	VAFB LC-75-1-2		Missile test	Suborbital	Success	
1960-03-02; 20:06	Thor DM-18A	Thor 272	VAFB LC-75-2-8		Missile test	Suborbital	Success	
1960-06-22; 23:26	Thor DM-18A	Thor 233	VAFB LC-75-2-7		Missile test	Suborbital	Success	
1960-10-11; 21:53	Thor DM-18A	Thor 186	VAFB LC-75-2-8		Missile test	Suborbital	Success	
1960-12-13; 20:08	Thor DM-18A	Thor 267	VAFB LC-75-2-8		Missile test	Suborbital	Success	
1961-03-30; 05:13:43	Thor DM-18A	Thor 243	VAFB LC-75-2-7		Missile test	Suborbital	Success	
1961-06-20; 23:54	Thor DM-18A	Thor 276	VAFB LC-75-2-7		Missile test	Suborbital	Success	
1961-09-06; 22:30	Thor DM-18A	Thor 165	VAFB LE-7		Missile test	Suborbital	Success	
1961-12-06; 01:30	Thor DM-18A	Thor 214	VAFB LE-8		Missile test	Suborbital	Success	
1962-03-19; 23:28	Thor DM-18A	Thor 229	VAFB LE-7		Missile test	Suborbital	Success	
1962-06-19; 00:30	Thor DM-18A	Thor 269	VAFB LE-8		Missile test	Suborbital	Success	

== Launch statistics ==
=== Launch outcome ===
- Success
- Partial Failure
- Failure

=== Launchpad ===
- CCAFS
- VAFB
