= Laverne Antrobus =

British psychologist/author/television presenter (born 1966)

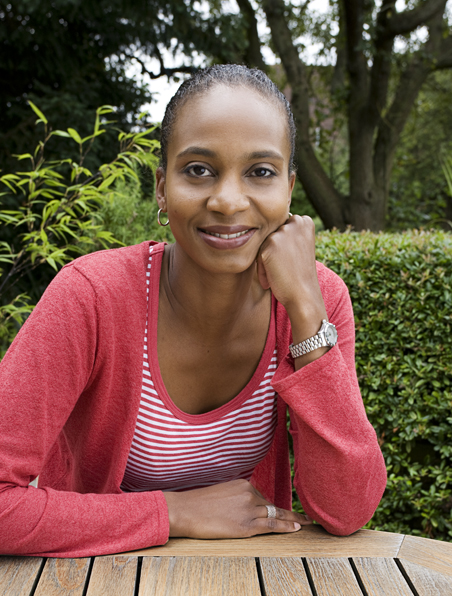
- Antrobus in 2009
- Born: Laverne Antrobus; 8 July 1966 (age 60)
- Occupations: Child psychologist, television expert
- Years active: 1990s–present
- Known for: Appearances on the BBC and Channel 5

Laverne Antrobus (born 8 July 1966) is a British child psychologist. She trained at the Tavistock and Portman NHS Foundation Trust in the 1990s. Throughout the 2000s and 2010s, Antrobus has hosted documentaries and appeared as an expert on the BBC and Channel 5.

== Career ==
Antrobus has worked as a primary school teacher. She later trained in the specialist mental health National Health Service trust Tavistock and Portman. She has worked as a consultant child and educational psychologist since the 1990s. Antrobus has led training relating to children's mental health in schools and community mental health services.

From 2004 to 2006, Antrobus appeared in the BBC Three series Little Angels and its spin-off version Teen Angels. A documentary series which followed families' daily life, Little Angels featured child psychology experts giving advice to parents about how to deal with behavioural problems in their young children. Teen Angels followed the same premise with teenagers in the place of young children. The programmes ran for seven series, with a total of 47 episodes (including one special). Antrobus was one of four psychologists on the show, including presenters Tanya Byron and Stephen Briers. The programme Little Angels was nominated for a BAFTA Award in 2005.

In 2007, Antrobus appeared throughout the fourth series of The House of Tiny Tearaways, a BBC Three reality programme about parents and misbehaving children. She was in the role of child psychologist, along with Elizabeth Kilbey, whilst Claudia Winkelman served as presenter. The series consisted of 20 episodes.

Antrobus presented the hour-long documentary Biology of Dads, which follows a father with Couvade syndrome and explores scientific knowledge about fatherhood. It comments on a father's role in language development, men's hormonal changes after becoming a father, and the influence a father has in his daughter's choice of partner. Biology of Dads aired on 22 June 2010 on BBC Four. On a similar topic, Antrobus appeared in 2010 in the BBC Four documentary Men About the House, a review of fathers in television.

Airing on 11 August 2011, Carrot or Stick? was a Horizon documentary produced for BBC Two in which Antrobus discussed the changing understanding of the science behind parenting over the past 50 years. In 2012, Antrobus hosted the three-part BBC Four documentary series Growing Children, which detailed child development of subjects with autism, obsessive–compulsive disorder and dyslexia.

In 2018, Antrobus appeared on the radio programme Woman's Hour. In August 2019, Antrobus starred in the four-part Channel 5 documentary series Violent Child, Desperate Parents, which follows families with violent and misbehaving children.

In October 2019, Antrobus co-presented a two-part documentary for 5Star, Britain's Naughtiest Nursery, with Jayne Ashbourne. The programme follows Antrobus working with children aged three to five who have been excluded from nurseries due to poor behaviour. One childcare expert criticised the programme for using the word "naughty" to describe children during a stage of development.

In 2020, Antrobus appeared on the BBC children's news programme Newsround, giving advice on anxiety induced by climate change and the COVID-19 pandemic, and explaining the effects of anxiety disorders.

In 2007, Antrobus book Ain't Misbehavin': How to Understand Your Child and Get the Best From Them was published by Pearson Education. Antrobus contributed to the 2017 book Help Your Kids With Growing Up, published by DK. Antrobus has additionally written articles for the BBC study resource Bitesize and the newspapers HuffPost and The Independent. In her role in the television industry, she has served as a judge on award panels for the Royal Television Society, British Academy Children's Awards and Grierson Awards.

In 2022 Antrobus appeared alongside Kate Winslet in an episode of the series I Am....

== Philanthropy ==
Antrobus has worked with the charity Siya Phulaphula "We Listen", which provides mental health training for South Africans living in London. She is a director on the trustee board for ChildHope UK, a charity which works with marginalised children and provides education in Africa and Asia.

== Credits ==
Filmography for Laverne Antrobus
Year	Title	Broadcaster	Role	Work
2004–6	Little Angels	BBC Three	Appeared	Seven series, 47 episodes
2007	The House of Tiny Tearaways	BBC Three	Appeared	Series four, 20 episodes
2010	Biology of Dads	BBC Four	Presenter	Hour-long documentary
2010	Men About the House	BBC Four	Appeared	Hour-long documentary
2011	Carrot or Stick? (Horizon)	BBC Two	Presenter	Hour-long documentary
2012	Growing Children	BBC Four	Presenter	Three-part documentary
2018	Woman's Hour	BBC Radio 4	Panelist	Radio programme
2019	Violent Child, Desperate Parents	Channel 5	Presenter	Four-part documentary
2019	Britain's Naughtiest Nursery	5Star	Co-presenter	Two-part documentary
