= The Life and Times of Vivienne Vyle =

British BBC TV sitcom 2007

- Genre: Sitcom
- Created by: Jennifer Saunders; Tanya Byron
- Starring: Jennifer Saunders
- Country of origin: United Kingdom
- No. of series: 1
- No. of episodes: 6

Production
- Executive producer: Jon Plowman
- Running time: 30 minutes

Original release
- Network: BBC Two
- Release: 4 October – 8 November 2007

The Life and Times of Vivienne Vyle is a British sitcom that was originally aired on BBC Two in 2007. The programme was written and created by Jennifer Saunders and Tanya Byron. The show stars Saunders as the title character of the talk show host, a caricature of Jeremy Kyle and other talk show hosts.

== Background and content ==
The Life and Times of Vivienne Vyle is described as a black comedy and a show-within-a-show, following both the on-screen and off-screen life of fictional TV host Vivienne Vyle, played by Jennifer Saunders. The programme follows the life of Vyle as she tries to balance her newly ascendant fame with her personal life. The BBC described the show as "Ab Fab meets The Larry Sanders Show with quite a bit of Ricki Lake and Oprah thrown in".

In a similar vein to confessional-style shows such as The Jerry Springer Show and Trisha, Vyle's show has episodes dedicated to raunchy and sensationalistic themes such as "My son calls the wrong man daddy" and "I want a vagina but can't kick the crack!" Vyle's name is a spoof on Jeremy Kyle, whose mannerisms and style of show are both parodied by Saunders' portrayal of Vyle.

The series is co-written with psychologist Tanya Byron, who originally came up with the idea and approached Saunders. Producer Jo Sargent stated: "She presented the idea for a comedy on the subject to Saunders, the aim being a black comedy with pop psychology at the root".

== Plot ==
The Life and Times of Vivienne Vyle revolves around Vivienne Vyle, a former weather presenter and presenter on TV-am, who now has her own talk show. Desperate for success, she is encouraged by the show's ambitious producer Helena De'Wend, who also owns her own production company. Helena is always trying to improve ratings, and her child only speaks Spanish as the nanny spends more time with him than with his mother. Vivienne's husband is Jared, who is gay and loves karaoke. Her PR adviser is Miriam, who is a transgender woman for whom Jared has an intense dislike. Vivienne's main rival is Chris Connor, who unlike Vyle has a good rapport with his audience.

The Vivienne Vyle Show's new psychotherapist is Dr. Jonathan Fowler, who constantly protests that many of the show's guests are too mentally unstable to appear on the show. The floor manager is the organised Carol and the director is Des. Abigail is the runner and Damien the researcher, who also builds up tension with the guests before they appear on the show.

== Reception ==
The Life and Times of Vivienne Vyle received a generally unfavourable reception by critics. The New York Times wrote: "You might even tear up. But it still would have been better to leave us laughing."

Variety wrote that "the intentionally awkward moments are just that, failing to generate any appreciable laughs."

PopMatters wrote: "this, for the most part, is anything but uplifting. Not that the first five episodes aren't worth watching (they are, but it's not for light laughs), but it's a shame it took until the last one of this series [...] to find its comic stride."

The Guardian critic wrote: "The Life and Times of Vivienne Vyle may be topical but it isn't clever, funny or entertaining", before another author from the same publication countered this opinion, writing, "The viewers and critics are wrong."

== Cast ==
- Jennifer Saunders as Vivienne Vyle
- Miranda Richardson as Helena De'Wend
- Conleth Hill as Jared
- Jason Watkins as Dr Jonathan Fowler
- Antonia Campbell-Hughes as Abigail Wilson
- Helen Griffin as Carol
- Dave Lamb as Des
- Lawry Lewin as Damien
- Christopher Ryan as Miriam
- Rochelle Gadd as Dionne
- Brian Conley as Chris Connor

== Episodes ==
#	Airdate	Overview	Viewers
1	4 October 2007	When Vivienne reveals on her show that a man is not the father of his former girlfriend's child, he attacks her and in the ensuing brawl a security guard falls on her. She then ends up in hospital and is on the verge of a mental breakdown. In her absence Fern Britton replaces her as the host of The Vivienne Vyle Show, while Helena sacks runner Abigail only for Vivienne to reinstate her.	1.8 million
2	11 October 2007	Vivienne decides she needs to revive her show, and attempts to copy the style of her rival Chris Connor by speaking to the audience. However, none of the audience talk to her. Vivienne then has a meeting to discuss the show's image with two promotion experts, Joshua and Rose. After little success at the meeting, she sacks them and seeks the advice of Miriam. Following her advice, she makes a personal appearance at a cash and carry in Slough.	1.3 million
3	18 October 2007	Vivienne and Jared argue in the morning over the plumbing and she then goes off for an interview with a tabloid journalist who calls her a "one-trick pony" and Jared a "kept man". Vivienne goes to work and then on to a production meeting. Helena throws her mobile phone at Carol while Jonathan is after his own show. When she gets home, Jared has failed to fix the plumbing.	900,000
4	25 October 2007	Vivienne's programme is nominated for the publicly voted TV Pick Award for "Best Daytime Talk Show". As the show is up for an award, they allow GMTV presenter Lynn Faulds Wood to film behind the scenes on a "catch-up" show. On the way to the awards ceremony, Vivienne discovers her football team are playing and so she and Jared go to watch them play instead. During the match, the awards ceremony is shown live and Vivienne wins the award. Fern Britton and Paul O'Grady make cameo appearances.	1.3 million
5	1 November 2007	The morning after their success at the TV Pick Awards, the crew of The Vivienne Vyle Show discuss the after-show party. When she wakes up, Vivienne feels dizzy and is unable to walk. A video conference is then held with Dr. Jonathan and Helena at the studio and Vivienne and Jared at their house. Jonathan manages to 'cure' Vivienne, who appears to have been suffering from psychological problems. During the conference, Jonathan and Helena, unbeknown to anyone else, kiss passionately.	1 million
6	8 November 2007	Janey (Harriet Thorpe), a journalist from Daily Mail, informs Jared that she has evidence of him at a gay party where a young rent boy fell off a balcony and died. Miriam comes up with ideas for damage limitation. However, The Vivienne Vyle Show is being broadcast live to mark the end of the season and at the end of the show, Vivienne does an unexpected piece to camera about the party and brings Jared on to admit he is an alcoholic, but does not mention he is gay. She then says she was abused as a child and, as the live show ends, gets a warm welcome from the audience.	1.1 million

== Worldwide broadcast ==
The Life and Times of Vivienne Vyle aired on Showcase in Canada, Sundance Channel in the United States, yes stars Base in Israel, Comedy Central in The Netherlands, GNT in Brazil, RTP2 in Portugal, DR2 in Denmark, YLE in Finland and UKTV in Australia.
