= All Saints' Church, Bubwith =

Church in Bubwith, East Riding of Yorkshire, England

Coordinates: 53.8171°N 0.9206°W

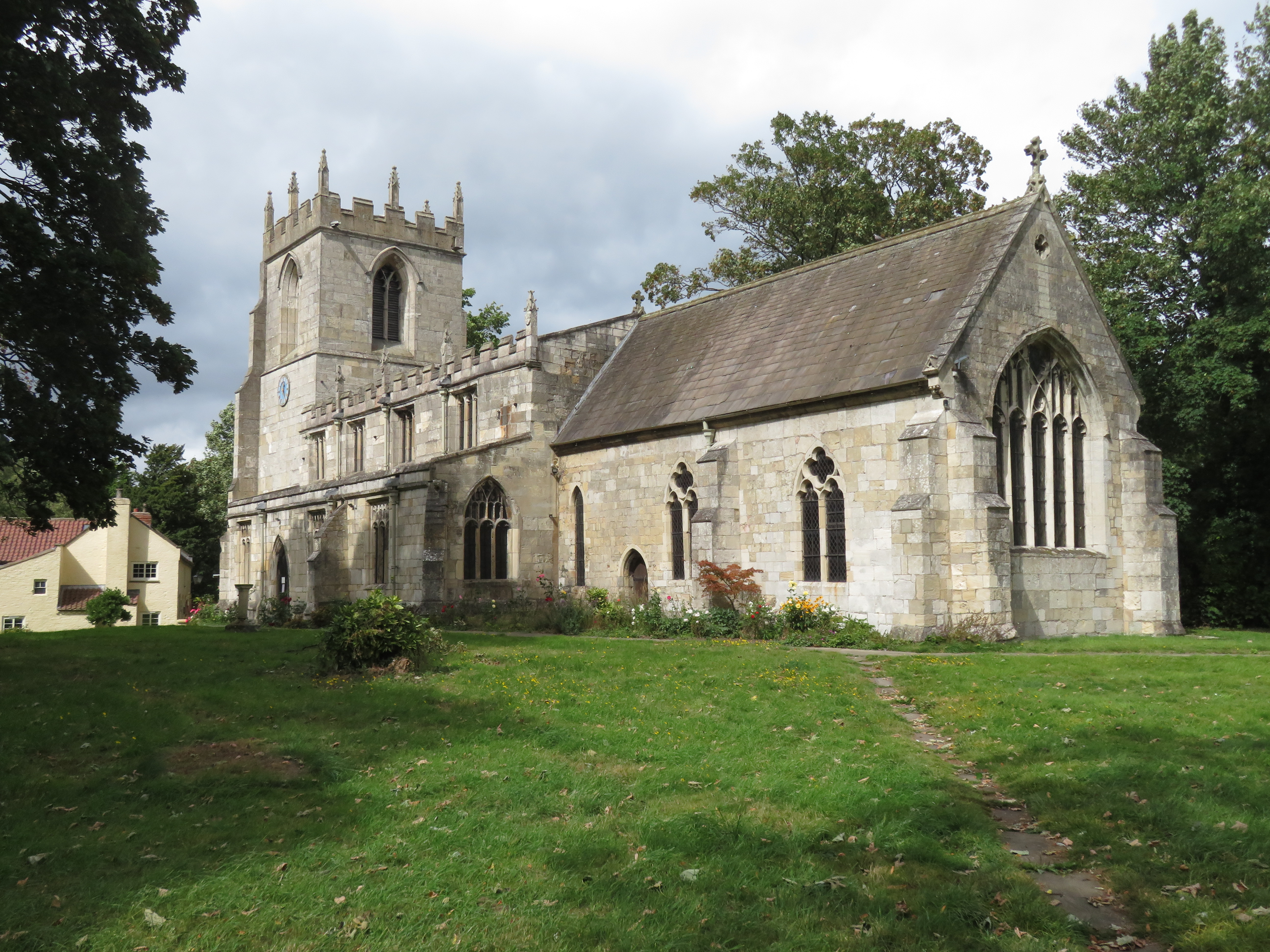
The church, in 2024

All Saints' Church is the parish church of Bubwith, a village in the East Riding of Yorkshire, in England.

The church was built in the late 12th century, from which period the nave survives. The chancel was added around 1300, followed by a north aisle in the mid 14th century. In the 15th century, a south aisle, tower and clerestory were added, with funding from Nicholas Bubwith and possibly to a design by Robert Cooper. The church was restored from 1894 to 1895 by C. Hodgson Fowler and Ewan Christian. It was grade I listed in 1960.

The church is built of limestone with a Westmorland slate roof, and consists of a nave with a clerestory, north and south aisles, a chancel and a west tower. The tower has two stages, diagonal buttresses, a three-light west window, a string course, two-light pointed bell openings with hood moulds, and an embattled parapet with eight crocketed pinnacles. The nave also has an embattled parapet. Inside, there is a relief of a small winged figure, probably dating from around 1200, and a 15th-century font inscribed "Fons de Bubvid".

== See also ==
- Grade I listed buildings in the East Riding of Yorkshire
- Listed buildings in Bubwith
