= PGM-17 Thor =

SM-75/PGM-17A Thor
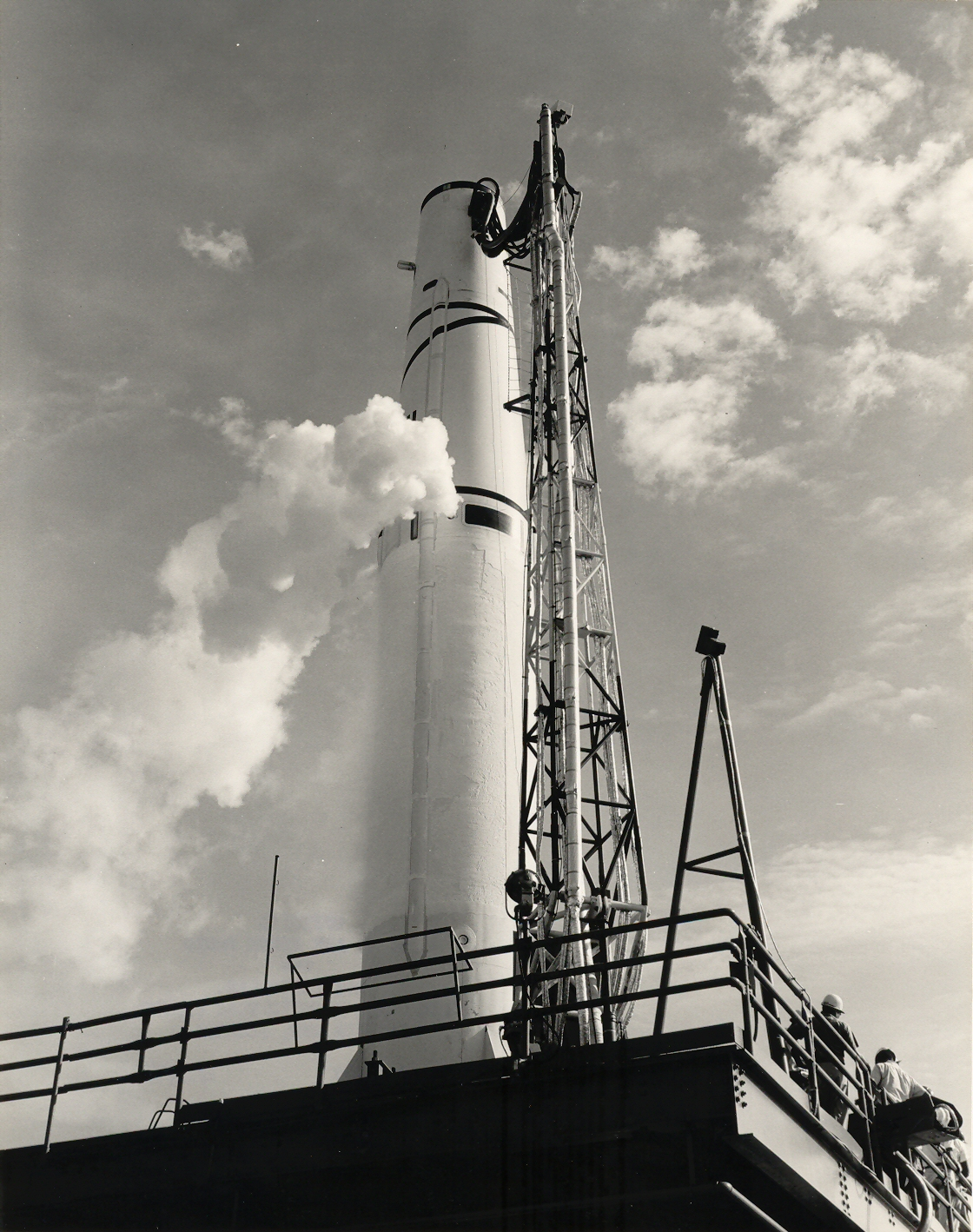
- A Thor intermediate range ballistic missile.
- Type: Intermediate-range ballistic missile
- Place of origin: United States

Service history
- Used by: United States Air Force (testing); Royal Air Force (operational deployment)

Production history
- Designed: 1957
- Manufacturer: Douglas Aircraft Company
- Produced: 1959–1960
- No. built: About 225; peak deployment was 60
- Variants: Delta rockets Thor rocket family

Specifications
- Mass: 49,590 kilograms (109,330 lb) at start.
- Length: 19.76 metres (64 ft 10 in).
- Diameter: 2.4 metres (8 ft).
- Propellant: kerosene and liquid oxygen
- Operational range: 2,820 kilometres (1,750 mi)
- Flight altitude: 630 kilometres (390 mi)

The PGM-17A Thor was the first operative ballistic missile of the United States Air Force (USAF). It was named after the Norse god of thunder. It was deployed in the United Kingdom with the Royal Air Force between 1959 and September 1963 as an intermediate-range ballistic missile (IRBM) with thermonuclear warheads. Thor was 65 feet (20 m) in height and 8 feet (2.4 m) in diameter.

The first generation of Thor missiles were rushed into service, and design mistakes resulted in a 24% launch failure rate. The competing PGM-19 Jupiter missile saw more use, but both were quickly eclipsed by the Air Force's long range ICBM program, which could be fired from U.S. soil. By 1959, with the Atlas missile well on its way to operational status, both Thor and Jupiter programs became obsolete as delivery vehicles, yet continued to be built and deployed until 1963 for political reasons and to maintain aerospace industry employment.

The missile's lasting legacy continued as the Thor and later Delta families of space launch vehicles used boosters derived from the initial Thor missile, and continued on into the 21st century.

== Development ==
Fearful that the Soviet Union would deploy a long-range ballistic missile before the U.S., in January 1956 the USAF began developing the Thor, a 1,500-mile (2,400 km) intermediate-range ballistic missile. The program proceeded quickly as a stop-gap measure, and within three years of inception the first of 20 Royal Air Force Thor squadrons became operational in the UK. The UK deployment carried the codename 'Project Emily'. One of the advantages of the design was that, unlike the Jupiter MRBM, the Thor could be carried by the USAF's cargo aircraft of the time, which made its deployment more rapid. The launch facilities were not transportable and had to be built on site. Once the first generation of ICBMs based in the U.S. became operational, Thor missiles were quickly retired. The last of the missiles was withdrawn from operational alert in 1963.

A small number of Thors with "Thrust Augmented Delta" boosters and W-49 Mod 6 warheads remained operational in the anti-satellite missile role as Program 437 until April 1975. These missiles were based on Johnston Island in the Pacific Ocean and had the ability to destroy satellites in low Earth orbit. With prior warning of an impending launch, they could destroy a Soviet spy satellite soon after orbital insertion.

=== Initial development ===
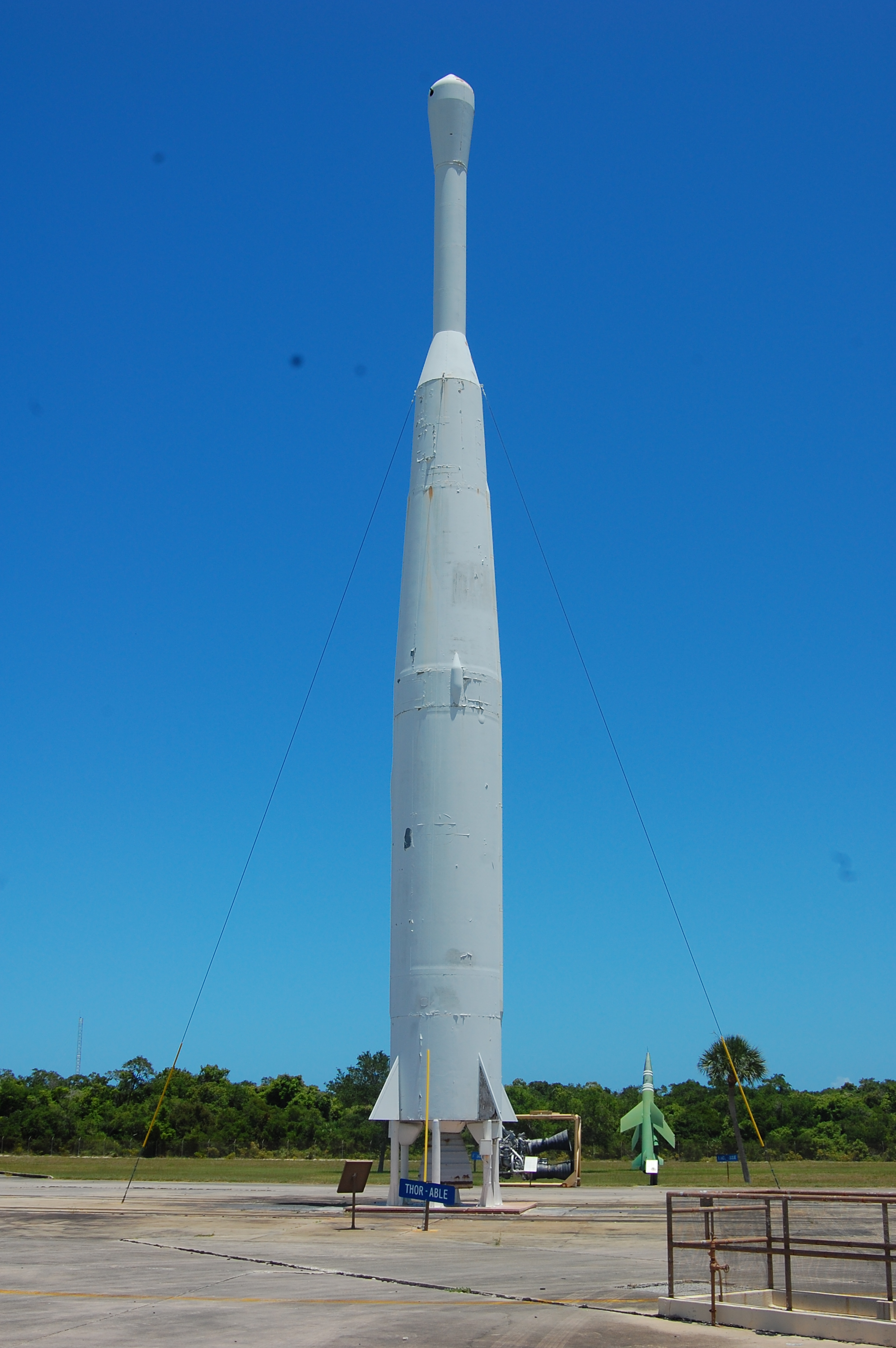
Thor-Able at the Cape Canaveral Space Force Museum, Florida

Development of the Thor was initiated by the USAF in 1954. The goal was a missile system that could deliver a nuclear warhead over a distance of 1,150 to 2,300 miles (1,850 to 3,700 km) with a Circular Error Probability (CEP) of 2 miles (3.2 km). This range would allow Moscow to be attacked from a launch site in the UK. The initial design studies were headed by Commander Robert Truax (U.S. Navy) and Dr. Adolph K. Thiel (Ramo-Wooldridge Corporation, formerly of Redstone Arsenal and previously of Nazi Germany). They refined the specifications to an IRBM with:

- A 1,750-mile (2,820 km) range
- 8 ft (2.4 m) diameter, 65 ft (20 m) long (so it could be carried by the C-124 Globemaster)
- A gross takeoff weight of 110,000 lb (50,000 kg)
- Propulsion provided by half of the existing SM-64 Navaho-derived Atlas booster engine
- 10,000 mph (4.5 km/s) maximum speed during warhead reentry
- Inertial guidance system with radio backup (for low susceptibility to enemy disruption)

Thor had vernier engines for roll control flanking the main engine, similar to the Atlas vernier engines on the sides of the propellant tanks.

On 30 November 1955, three companies were given one week to bid on the project: Douglas, Lockheed, and North American Aviation. The missile was to use existing technology, skills, abilities, and techniques to speed entry into service. On 27 December 1955, Douglas was awarded the prime contract for the airframe and integration. The Rocketdyne division of North American Aviation was awarded the engine contract, AC Spark Plug the primary inertial guidance system, Bell Labs the backup radio guidance system, and General Electric the nose cone/reentry vehicle. Douglas' proposal included choosing bolted tank bulkheads (as opposed to the initially suggested welded ones) and a tapered fuel tank for improved aerodynamics.

The engine was a direct descendant of the Atlas MA-3 booster engine, with removal of one thrust chamber and a rerouting of the plumbing to allow the engine to fit within the smaller Thor thrust section.

Engine component tests began in March 1956. The first engineering model engine was available in June, followed by the first flight engine in September. Early Thor engines suffered from foaming turbopump lubricating oil at high altitudes and bearing retention issues, resulting in several launch failures. The initial Thor tests in 1957 used an early version of the Rocketdyne LR-79 engine with a conical nozzle and 135,000 lbf (600 kN) of thrust. By early 1958, this had been replaced by an improved model with a bell-shaped nozzle see and 150,000 lbf (670 kN) of thrust. The fully developed Thor IRBM had 162,000 lbf (720 kN) of thrust.

=== Phase I test launches ===
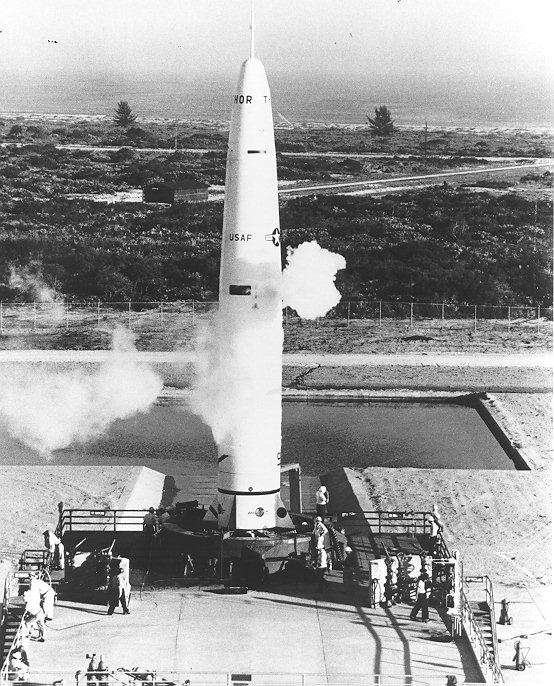
Thor 101 on a launch pad, January 1957

Thor was test launched from LC-17 at Cape Canaveral Missile Annex. The compressed development schedule meant that plans for the Atlas bunker had to be used to allow the completion of the facility in time, with launchpad LC-17B completed just in time for the first test flight.

Missile 101, the first flight-ready Thor, arrived at Cape Canaveral in October 1956. It was erected at LC-17B and underwent several practice propellant loading/unloading exercises, a static firing test, and a month-long delay while a defective relay was replaced. Launch finally took place on 25 January 1957. The engine lost thrust almost immediately after liftoff, and the Thor fell onto the launch pad and exploded. A film of prelaunch preparations showed crews dragging a liquid oxygen (LOX) filler hose through a sandy area, which led to the belief that debris entering the LOX, caused the failure of a valve.

Thor 102 was launched on 20 April 1957. The booster performed normally, but the flight was terminated at 35 seconds after an erroneous console readout caused the Range Safety Officer to believe that the missile was headed inland instead of out to sea. The tracking console was found to be wired in reverse. The short flight raised confidence that Thor could fly successfully.

The third Thor launch (Missile 103) exploded four minutes before the planned launch after a defective valve allowed LOX tank pressure to build up to unsafe levels. The responsible technicians had also failed to pay attention to the tank pressure gauges. LC-17B consequently had to be repaired for the second time in four months.

Missile 104, launched 22 August from the newly opened LC-17A, broke up at T+92 seconds due to a drop in signal strength from the programmer, causing the engine to gimbal hard right. The guidance system tried to compensate, but the resulting structural loads exceeded the strength of the missile tankage.

Thor 105, on 20 September 1957, completed the first successful flight, which occurred 21 months after the start of the program. No telemetry equipment was included on this missile, with the resulting mass savings allowing a total range of 1,500 miles (2,400 km).

Missile 107 (3 October) fell back onto LC-17A and exploded at launch when a gas generator valve failed to open.

Missile 108 (11 October) exploded around T+140 seconds without prior warning. Engineers were initially unable to determine the cause of the failure. After the first Thor-Able launch failed six months later due to a seized turbopump, it was concluded that a similar failure had occurred on 108. However, 108 did not have sufficient instrumentation to determine the exact nature of the failure.

The final three Thor tests during 1957 were all successful, but 1958 began with back-to-back failures. Thor 114 was destroyed by Range Safety 150 seconds into launch when the guidance system lost power and Thor 120's engine shut down slightly under two minutes after liftoff. The telemetry system had experienced a power failure during launch, so the reason for the engine cutoff could not be satisfactorily determined.

On 19 April 1958, Missile 121 dropped back onto LC-17B and exploded, putting the pad out of action for three months. A fuel duct collapse was believed to have been the culprit.

On 22 April, Missile 117, carrying the first Able upper stage, lost thrust and broke up at T+146 seconds due to a turbopump failure.

The Jupiter, Thor, and Atlas missiles all used a variant of the Rocketdyne LR-79 engine and all three suffered launch failures due to a marginal turbopump design. There were two separate problems with the pumps. The first was the discovery during testing at Huntsville that the lubricant oil tended to foam at high altitude as the air pressure decreased. The other was that pump shaft vibration from the nearly 10,000 RPM operating speed would cause the bearings to come out of their sockets, resulting in the pump abruptly seizing up. The Army had suspended Jupiter launches for four months until the turbopump issues could be resolved, and as a result no more pump failures affected that program.

In contrast, the USAF's General Schreiver rejected the idea of sending Thor and Atlas missiles back to the factory so as to not delay the testing program. Instead, in-field modifications to pressurize the turbopump gearboxes and use an oil with a different viscosity that was less prone to foaming were conducted. Modified bearing retainers were not installed. Subsequently, six consecutive Thor and Atlas launches failed during February–April 1958, several due to turbopump problems. The following four months did not include any turbopump failures, but the 17 August 1958, launch of the world's first lunar probe on Thor-Able 127 ended in an explosion due to a turbopump failure. A month later, Atlas 6B also suffered a turbopump failure and the Air Force gave in and agreed to replace the turbopumps in all of their missiles, after which there were no more launch failures due to a turbopump problem.

Five successful Thor tests were conducted in June–July 1958, the last one carrying a mouse named Wickie on a biological mission; the capsule sank into the ocean and could not be recovered. Thor 126 (26 July) lost thrust 50 seconds into launch when a LOX valve inadvertently closed. The vehicle pitched down and broke up from aerodynamic loads. On 30 July 1958, six Douglas technicians were severely burned, three fatally, when a LOX valve failed at the Thor static test stand in Sacramento, California.

=== Phase II launches ===
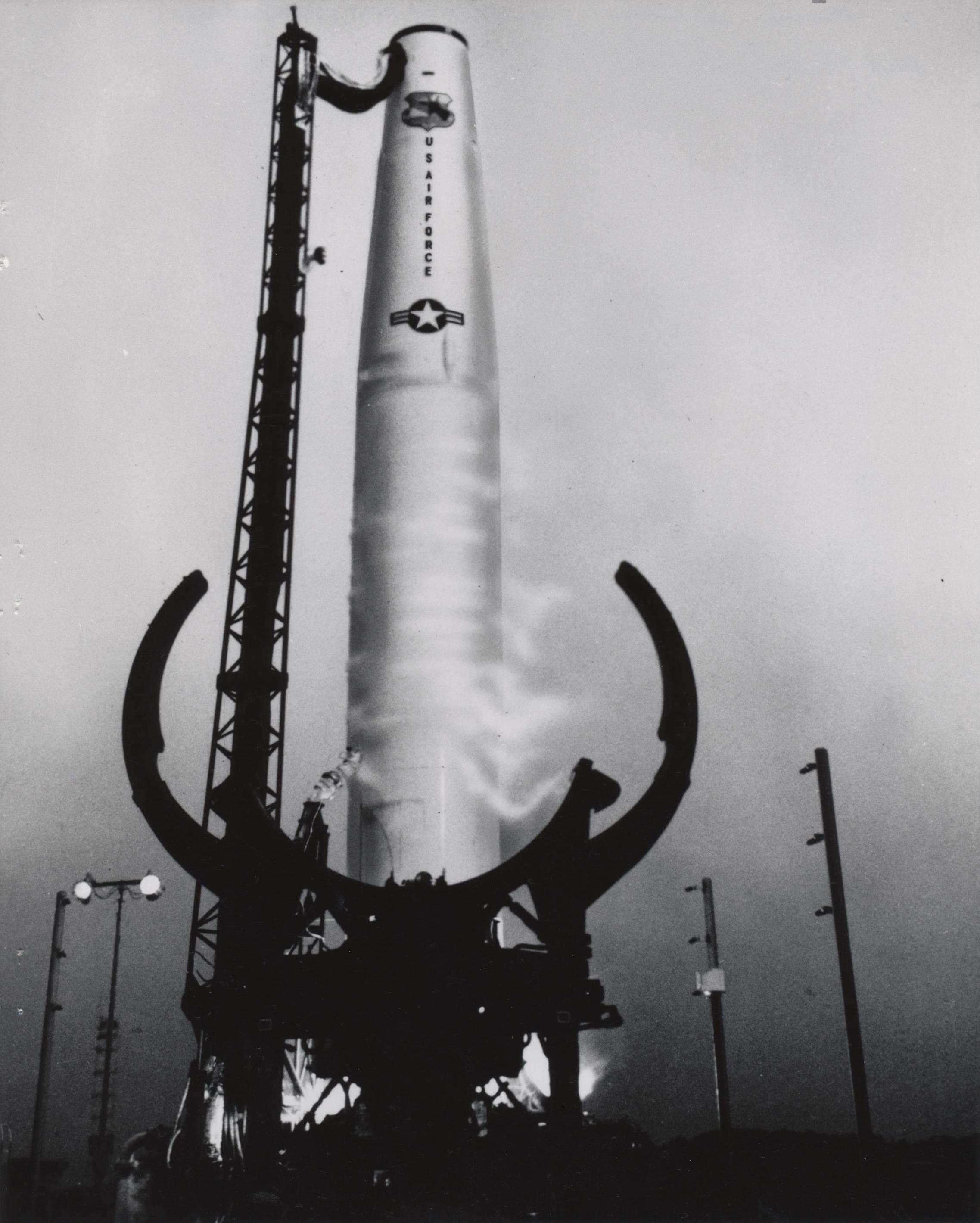
Missile 151, nicknamed "Tune Up", on 16 December 1958, just prior to its launch from Vandenberg Air Force Base. The successful test was conducted a year after the base was activated.

Phase II testing with the AC Spark Plug inertial guidance system began 7 December with the first successful flight on 19 December 1957.

The operational variant of the Thor, the DM-18A, began testing in the autumn of 1958, but Missile 138 (5 November) went out of control shortly after liftoff and had to be destroyed. Nonetheless, Thor was declared operational and testing now began at Vandenberg Air Force Base on the West Coast when Missile 151 flew successfully on 16 December. On 30 December, a near repeat performance of the 5 November failure happened when Missile 149 lost control and was destroyed 40 seconds into launch.

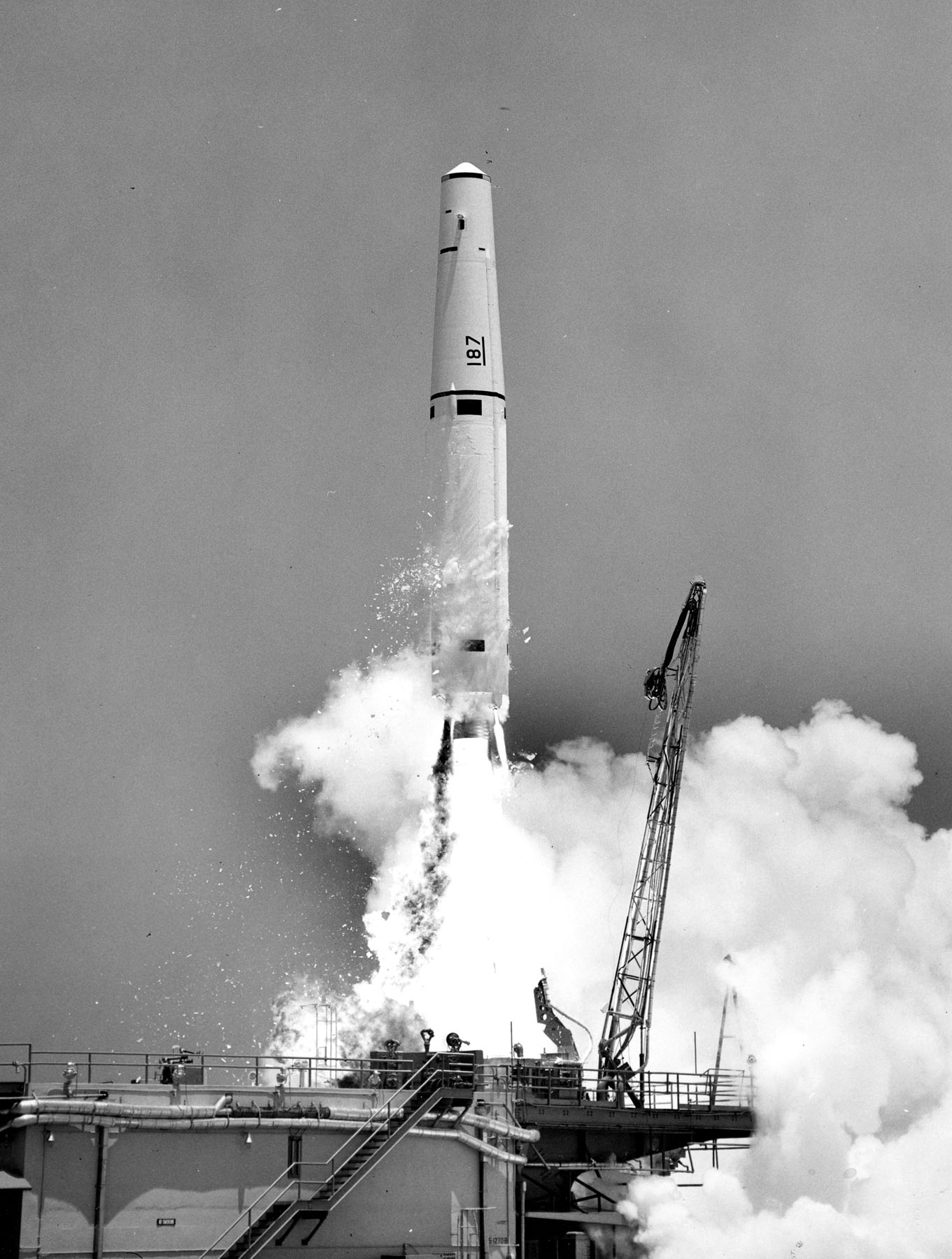
Thor missile 187 test. Cape Canaveral, 12 May 1959.

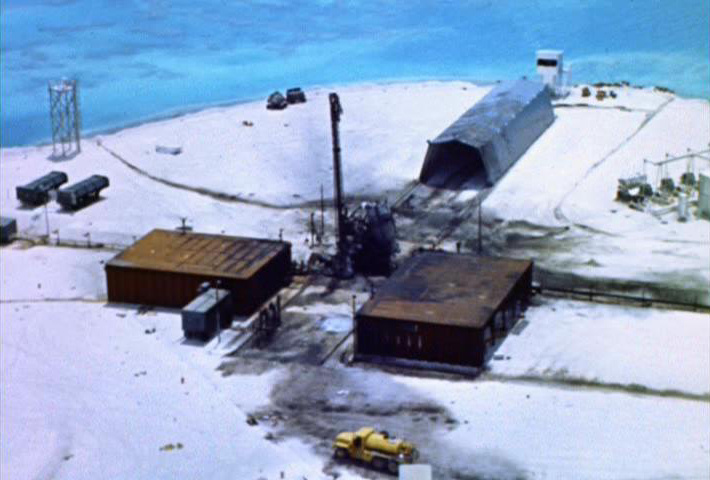
Johnston Island Launch Emplacement One (LE1) after a Thor missile launch failure and explosion contaminated the island with plutonium during the Operation "Bluegill Prime" nuclear test, July 1962. The retractable missile shelter (on rails) can be seen at the rear

After a run of successful launches during the first half of 1959, Missile 191, the first to be launched by a Royal Air Force crew, suffered another control malfunction while being launched from VAFB. This time, the missile's pitch and roll program failed to activate and it continued flying straight up. Launch crews initially did nothing as they reasoned that the Earth's rotation would gradually take it away from land and they wished to continue collecting data as long as possible. Eventually though, they became nervous about it exploding or pitching over, so the destruct command was sent around 50 seconds into launch. High-altitude wind caused debris to land in the town of Orcutt near the base. After Thor 203 repeated the same failure four weeks later, an investigation found that the culprit was a safety wire that had been meant to prevent the control tape in the programmer from inadvertently coming loose during vehicle assembly. The wire would ordinarily be cut after installation of the programmer in the missile, but Douglas technicians had forgotten this important step, thus the tape could not be spooled and the pitch and roll sequence did not activate. Another 23 Thor missile tests were carried out during 1959, with only one failure, when Missile 185 on 16 December, the second RAF launch, broke up due to a control malfunction.

=== Service rivalry with Jupiter ===
The Jupiter missile, a joint effort of Chrysler and the U.S. Army Redstone Arsenal in Huntsville, Alabama, was originally designed to attack high-value targets like airfields, train switching yards and command and control sites with extremely high accuracy. The Redstone team, under the direction of Wernher von Braun, ultimately delivered an inertial guidance system that was accurate to about 5,900 feet (1,800 m).

During development, the U.S. Navy became involved in the Jupiter program, with the objective of arming submarines with a ballistic missile. This led to the Jupiter's squat shape, which allowed it to be stored within the confines of a submarine hull. However, the Navy was always concerned about the extremely risky situation of a liquid-fueled rocket stored in the confines of a submarine. By 1956, the Polaris program was proposed instead, which featured a solid-fueled SLBM that was much lighter and safer to store. The Navy quickly switched to Polaris and dropped Jupiter.

With two IRBMs of nearly identical capabilities, it seemed obvious that only one of the two would ultimately achieve operational status, resulting in a competition between the Army and Air Force. Jupiter's testing program began two months after Thor's and proceeded more smoothly. Accidents such as the explosion of Thor 103 were avoided, and the turbopump issues that plagued early Rocketdyne engines were also resolved in Jupiter much earlier than the Air Force's missiles.

The Jupiter program was more successful due to far better testing and preparation, with each missile given a full duration static firing in Huntsville prior to delivery. Thors were given a PFRF (Pre Flight Readiness Firing) prior to launch; these were between 5 and 15 seconds only as the launching facilities were not designed for a full duration firing. Missile 107 had not been given a PFRF at all and its launch ended in a pad explosion. A static firing stand for Thor tests was only opened in May 1958, at which point the missile's launch record stood at four successes and nine failures, including four launchpad explosions. For comparison, at the end of May 1958 Jupiter had five successes and three failures with no pad explosions. Thanks to the thorough testing done at Huntsville, Jupiter missiles mostly all arrived at CCAS in flight-ready condition while Thors typically required extensive repairs or modification before launch.

After the Soviet launches of Sputnik 1 and 2 in late 1957, U.S. Secretary of Defense Charles Wilson announced that both Thor and Jupiter would go into service as his final act before leaving office. This was both out of fear of Soviet capabilities and also to avoid political repercussions from the workplace layoffs that would result at either Douglas or Chrysler if one of the two missiles were canceled.

== Deployment ==
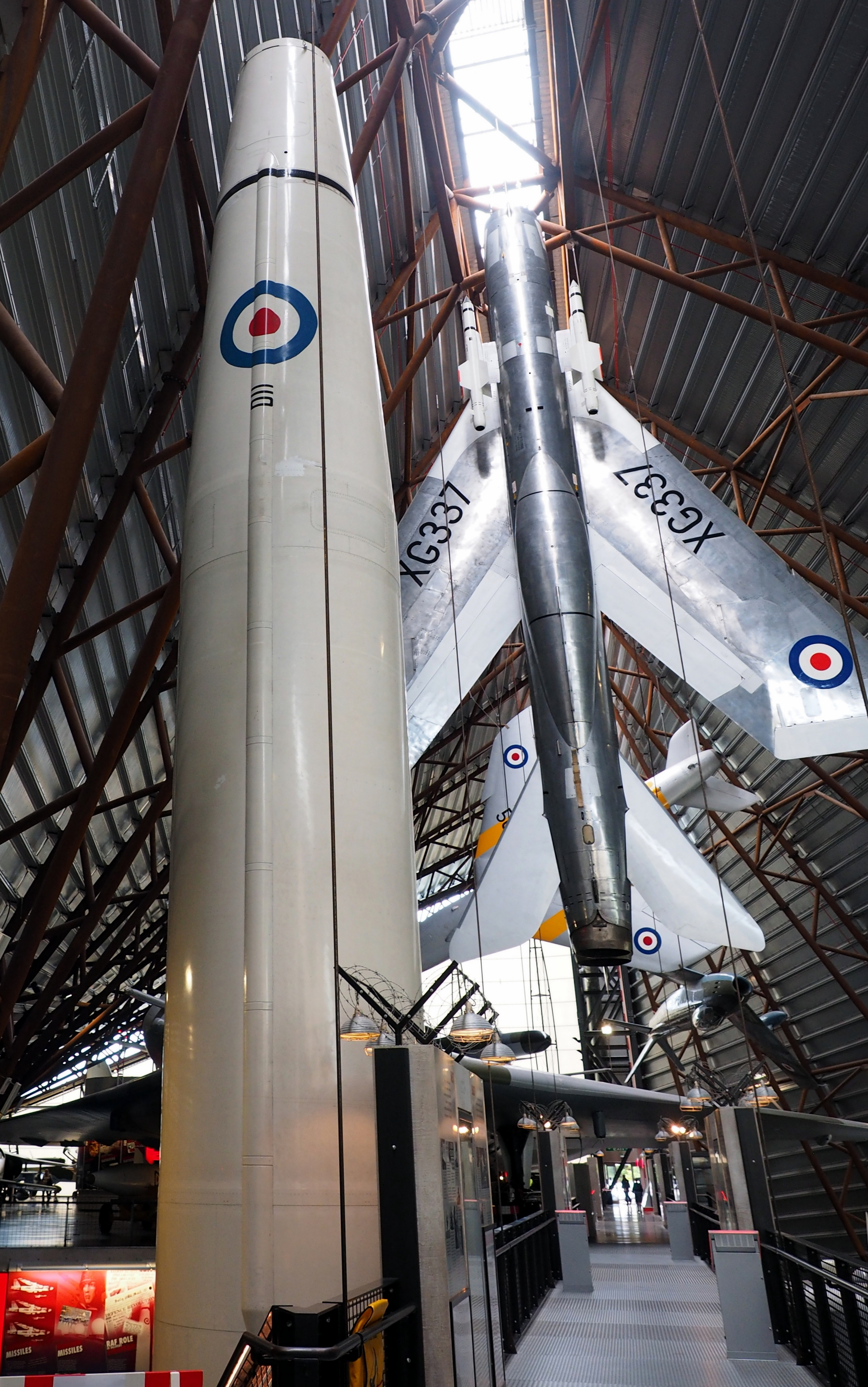
Thor missile T-110 (left of English Electric Lightning) in RAF Museum Cosford

Deployment of the IRBM fleet to Europe proved more difficult than expected, as no NATO members other than the UK accepted the offer to have Thor missiles stationed on their soil. Italy and Turkey both agreed to accept Jupiter missiles. Thor was deployed to the UK starting in August 1958, operated by 20 squadrons of RAF Bomber Command under US-UK dual key control. The first active unit was No. 77 Squadron RAF at RAF Feltwell in 1958, with the remaining units becoming active in 1959. All were deactivated by September 1963.

All 60 of the Thor missiles deployed in the UK were based at above-ground launch sites. The missiles were stored horizontally on transporter-erector trailers and covered by a retractable missile shelter. To fire the weapon, the crew used an electric motor to roll back the missile shelter, essentially a long shed mounted on steel rails, then used a powerful hydraulic launcher-erector to lift the missile to an upright position for launch. Once it was standing on the launch mount, the missile was fueled and could be fired. The entire launch sequence, from starting to roll back the missile shelter through to ignition of the rocket engine and lift-off, took approximately 15 minutes. Main engine burn time was almost 2.5 minutes, boosting the missile to a speed of 14,400 ft/s (4,400 m/s). Ten minutes into its flight the missile reached an altitude of 280 miles (450 km), close to the apogee of its elliptical flight path. At that point the reentry vehicle separated from the missile fuselage and began its descent toward the target. Total flight time from launch to target impact was approximately 18 minutes.

The Thor was initially deployed with a very blunt conical G.E. Mk 2 'heat sink' re-entry vehicle. They were later converted to the slender G.E. Mk 3 ablative RV. Both RVs contained a W-49 thermonuclear warhead with an explosive yield of 1.44 megatons.

The IRBM program was quickly eclipsed by the Air Force's ICBM program and made redundant. By 1959, with Atlas well on its way to operational status, Thor and Jupiter became obsolete, although both remained in service as missiles until 1963. IRBM programs did bring ballistic missiles into operational strategic deterrent service. However, most NATO allies were unwilling to have nuclear missiles on their soil. As technology continued to develop, IRBMs were succeeded by longer-ranged ICBMs. Yet the IRBM programs continued anyway for political reasons and a desire to keep the workforce at their respective assembly plants employed.

Thor's lasting legacy was not as a missile, but its use as the basis for the Thor/Delta space launcher family into the 21st century.

=== Nuclear-armed test flights ===
- 2 June 1962, failed Bluegill flight, tracking lost after launch, Thor and nuclear device destroyed.
- 19 June 1962, failed Starfish flight, Thor and nuclear device destroyed 59 seconds after launch at 30,000 to 35,000 feet (9,100 to 10,700 m) altitude.
- 8 July 1962, Thor missile 195 launched a Mk4 reentry vehicle containing a W49 thermonuclear warhead to an altitude of 250 miles (400 km). The warhead detonated with a yield of 1.45 Mt of TNT (6.07 PJ). This was the Starfish Prime event of nuclear test series Operation Fishbowl.
- 25 July 1962, failed Bluegill Prime flight, Thor and nuclear device destroyed on launch pad, which was contaminated with plutonium.

=== 1963 mystery cloud ===
On 28 February 1963, a Thor rocket carrying a spy satellite into orbit was launched from Vandenberg Air Force Base. The rocket went off course and mission control detonated the rocket at an altitude of 27 mi (44 km) before it could reach orbit. The rocket detonation produced a large circular cloud that appeared over the southwestern United States. Due to its mysterious nature, appearing at a very high altitude and being visible for hundreds of miles, the cloud attracted widespread attention and was published by the news media. The cloud was featured on the cover of Science Magazine in April 1963, Weatherwise Magazine in May 1963, and had a full page image published in the May issue of Life Magazine. Prof. James MacDonald at the University of Arizona Institute for Atmospheric Physics investigated the phenomena and linked it to the Thor rocket launch after contacting military personnel at Vandenberg Air Force Base. When the launch records were later declassified, the United States Air Force released a memo explaining that the cloud was "the result of a military operation", but did not clarify.

== Launch vehicle ==
Despite being retired from deployment as a missile a few years after deployment, the Thor rocket found widespread use as a space launch vehicle. It was the first in a large family of space launch vehicles—the Delta rockets. The last remaining direct descendant of the Thor, the Delta II, was retired in 2018, and the Delta IV was based on mostly new technology, unlike the Delta II. The last rocket of the Delta rocket family flew on 9 April 2024.

== Former operators ==
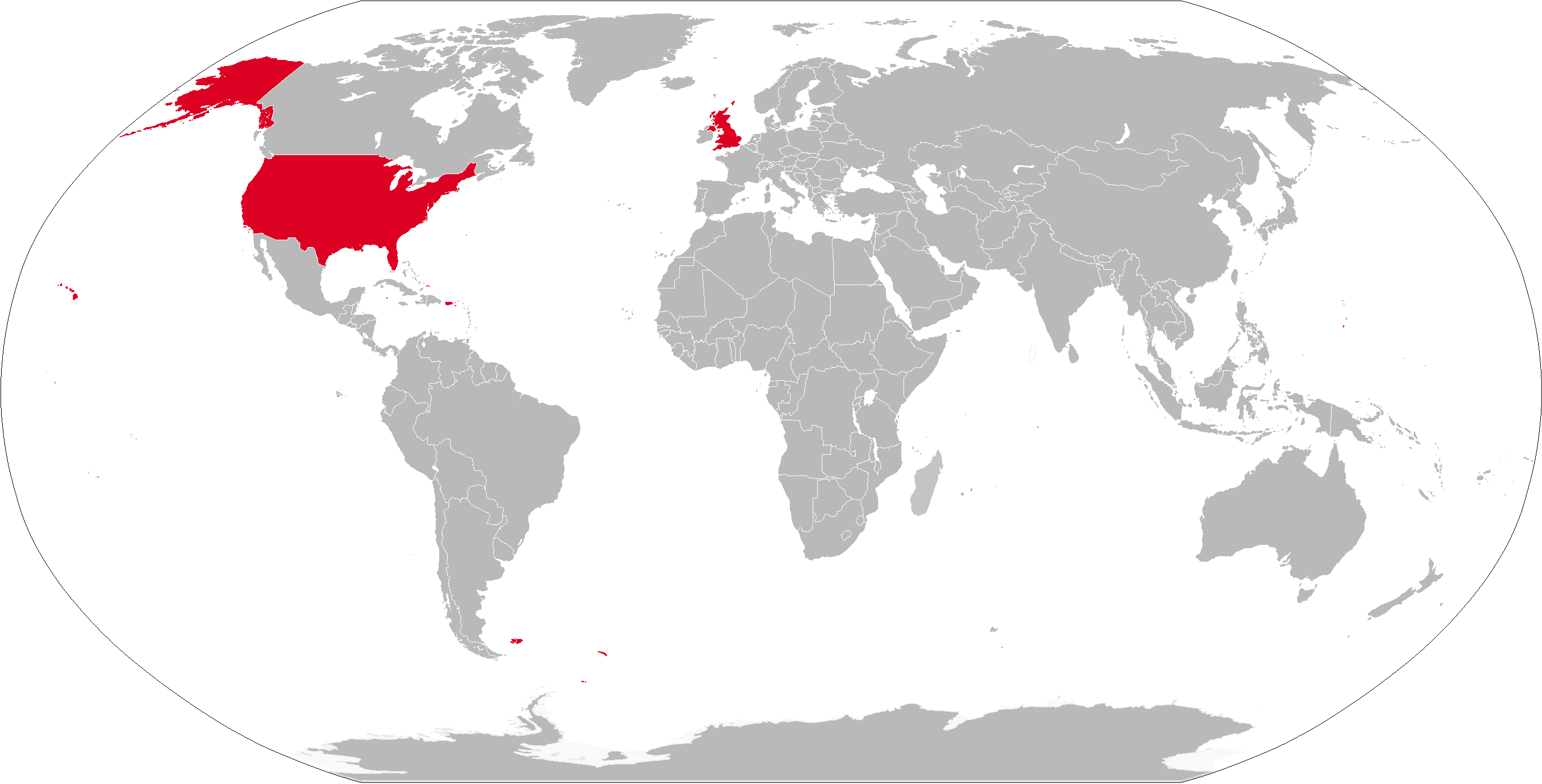
Map with former PGM-17 operators in red

United States

United States Air Force

United Kingdom

Royal Air Force operated a maximum of 60 missiles, with each squadron controlling 3 missiles

- Bomber Command
  - No. 1 Group
    - Hemswell Wing
      - No. 97 (Strategic Missile) Squadron – RAF Hemswell, Lincolnshire
      - No. 104 (Strategic Missile) Squadron – RAF Ludford Magna, Lincolnshire
      - No. 106 (Strategic Missile) Squadron – RAF Bardney, Lincolnshire
      - No. 142 (Strategic Missile) Squadron – RAF Coleby Grange, Lincolnshire
      - No. 269 (Strategic Missile) Squadron – RAF Caistor, Lincolnshire
    - Driffield Wing
      - No. 98 (Strategic Missile) Squadron – RAF Driffield, Yorkshire
      - No. 102 (Strategic Missile) Squadron – RAF Full Sutton, Yorkshire
      - No. 150 (Strategic Missile) Squadron – RAF Carnaby, Yorkshire
      - No. 226 (Strategic Missile) Squadron – RAF Catfoss, Yorkshire
      - No. 240 (Strategic Missile) Squadron – RAF Breighton, Yorkshire
  - No. 3 Group
    - Feltwell Wing
      - No. 77 (Strategic Missile) Squadron – RAF Feltwell, Norfolk
      - No. 82 (Strategic Missile) Squadron – RAF Shepherds Grove, Suffolk
      - No. 107 (Strategic Missile) Squadron – RAF Tuddenham, Suffolk
      - No. 113 (Strategic Missile) Squadron – RAF Mepal, Cambridgeshire
      - No. 220 (Strategic Missile) Squadron – RAF North Pickenham, Norfolk
    - North Luffenham Wing
      - No. 144 (Strategic Missile) Squadron – RAF North Luffenham, Rutland
      - No. 130 (Strategic Missile) Squadron – RAF Polebrook, Northamptonshire
      - No. 223 (Strategic Missile) Squadron – RAF Folkingham, Lincolnshire
      - No. 218 (Strategic Missile) Squadron – RAF Harrington, Northamptonshire
      - No. 254 (Strategic Missile) Squadron – RAF Melton Mowbray, Leicestershire

== Specifications (PGM-17A) ==
- Family:
  - Thor IRBM
  - Thor DM-18 (single stage LV)
  - Thor DM-19 (rocket 1st stage)
  - Thor DM-21 (rocket 1st stage)
  - Thor DSV-2 (suborbital launch vehicle)
  - Thor DSV-2J (anti-ballistic missile)
  - Thor DSV-2U (orbital launch vehicle)
- Overall length: 65.0 ft (19.82 m)
- Span: 9.0 ft (2.74 m)
- Weight: 109,800 lb (49,800 kg)
- Empty weight: 6,889 lb (3,125 kg)
- Core diameter: 8.0 ft (2.44 m)
- Range: 1,500–1,900 mi (2,400–3,000 km)
- Ceiling: 300 mi (480 km)
- Guidance: Inertial
- Maximum speed: 11,000 mph (17,700 km/h)
- Engines:
  - Vernier: 2 × Rocketdyne LR101-NA; 1,000 lbf (4.4 kN) each
  - Rocketdyne LR79-NA-9 (Model S-3D);
- Propellants: LOX/RP-1 Kerosene
- Liftoff thrust (sl): 150,000 lbf (670 kN)
- Thrust (vac): 170,000 lbf (760 kN)
- Specific impulse: 282 seconds (2.77 km/s)
- Specific impulse (sea level): 248 seconds (2.43 km/s)
- Burn time: 165 s
- Mass engine: 1,418 lb (643 kg)
- Diameter: 8.0 ft (2.44 m)
- Chambers: 1
- Chamber pressure: 590 psi (4.1 MPa)
- Area Ratio: 8.00
- Thrust-to-weight ratio: 120.32
- Warhead:
  - One W49 warhead on Mk. 2 reentry vehicle
- Warhead mass: 2,200 lb (1,000 kg)
- Yield: equivalent to 1.44 Megatons of TNT (6.02 PJ)
- CEP: 0.6 mi (1 km)
- First flight: 1958
- Last flight: 1980
- Total number built: 224
- Total development built: 64
- Total production built: 160
- Flown: 145.
- Development cost (US dollars): $500 million
- Recurring price (US dollars): $6.25 million
- Flyaway unit cost: US$750,000 in 1958 dollars
- Launches: 59
- Failures: 14
- Success rate: 76.27%
- First launch date: 25 January 1957
- Last launch date: 5 November 1975

== See also ==
- Project Emily

Related lists

- List of military aircraft of the United States
- List of missiles
- List of Thor DM-18A launches
- Strategic Air Command
- Thor (rocket family)
  - Thor-Able
  - Thor-Agena
  - Thor-Delta

== Books referencing RAF use ==
- Jefford, C.G. RAF Squadrons, a Comprehensive record of the Movement and Equipment of all RAF Squadrons and their Antecedents since 1912. Shrewsbury, Shropshire, UK: Airlife Publishing, 1988 (second edition 2001). ISBN 1-85310-053-6. p. 178.
- Wynn, Humphrey. RAF Strategic Nuclear Deterrent Forces, their Origins, Roles and Deployment 1946–69. London: HMSO, 1994. ISBN 0-11-772833-0. p. 449.
