= John Sichel =

British film director

- Born: John Peter Sichel; 21 September 1937; France
- Died: 5 April 2005 (aged 67); Bubwith, East Riding of Yorkshire, United Kingdom
- Occupations: Film director, producer, screenwriter
- Years active: 1968–1980
- Spouse: Elfie Corbett (m. 1962–2005)
- Children: 2

John Peter Sichel (21 September 1937 – 5 April 2005) was a British director of film, stage and television, and, later in life, a film, television, and theatre trainer.

Early in his career, he became known for translating the classical theatre repertoire to the screen. After he directed Alec Guinness and Ralph Richardson in a television version of Twelfth Night (1969), he was asked by Laurence Olivier to direct the National Theatre Company in the film of Anton Chekhov's Three Sisters (1970) with Olivier, Joan Plowright and Alan Bates. He subsequently directed Olivier in Shakespeare's The Merchant of Venice (1973), again from a National Theatre Company production. This was remounted for CBC in Canada in 1976 with a Canadian cast which included A. E. Holland as Shylock, Allan Grey, Micki Maunsell, Jack Rigg and Barney O'Sullivan. He also produced the first three series of Thriller (1973–74) for the British Associated Television (ATV) company for whom the two Shakespeare adaptations had also been produced.

His experience as a commissioner and director of drama and drama-documentaries enabled him to work with numerous prominent performers including (in addition to those already mentioned) Sir Derek Jacobi, Dame Helen Mirren, Sir Anthony Hopkins, Sir Sean Connery and Sir Michael Caine.

He also worked as a director and trainer at several of the UK's leading theatres and institutions including the Young Vic, the Guildhall School of Music and Drama, RADA, the Shaw Theatre, the Italia Conti Academy, the London Film School and the Edinburgh Festival.

During the latter years of his career, he established ARTTS International in Bubwith, East Riding of Yorkshire, a training facility supporting artists in employment with the stage, film and television industry. Along with wife Elfie, they helped 500 young people gain employment from afar as Indonesia and Iran.

After his death, aged 67, in Bubwith in 2005, hundreds of these trainees came from all over the world to pay their respects in a tribute arranged by his family.

== Family ==
He was the father of British psychologist and TV presenter Tanya Byron and TV producer Katrina Sichel.
