= Breighton Aerodrome =

Royal Air Force base in Yorkshire, England

Breighton Airfield (RAF Breighton)
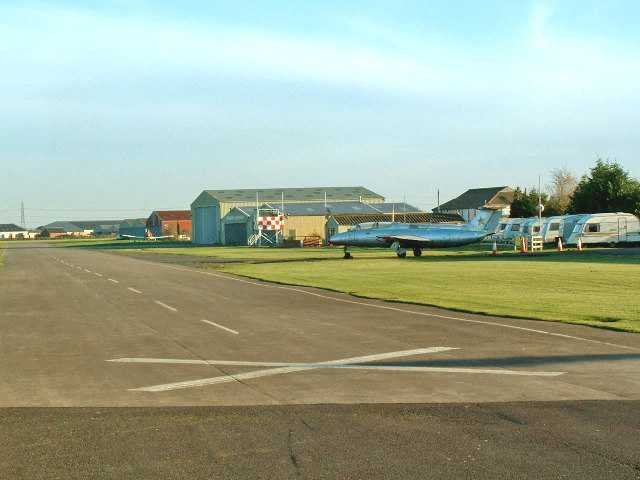
- Breighton Airfield and Aeroplane Museum
- IATA: none; ICAO: ~~EGBR~~

Summary
- Owner: Air Ministry 1940–1964; Private 1964 – present
- Operator: Royal Air Force 1940–1964; Private 1964 – present
- Location: Breighton, East Riding of Yorkshire
- Built: 1940
- In use: 1942–1964
- Elevation AMSL: 20 ft (6.1 m)
- Coordinates: 53°48′07″N 000°54′49″W

Map
- Location in East Riding of Yorkshire

Runways
Direction	Length		Surface
Direction	ft	m	Surface
10/28	2,630	802	Grass
00/00	0	0	Asphalt
00/00	0	0	Asphalt
00/00	0	0	Asphalt

Breighton Aerodrome is a private aerodrome primarily used for general aviation flying located on the former Royal Air Force Breighton or more simply RAF Breighton, a former Royal Air Force station located near to the village of Breighton, East Riding of Yorkshire, England.

== History ==
The airfield was built between 1940 and 1942 for No. 1 Group RAF, its first residents were the No. 460 Squadron RAAF.

From 1959 to 1963, as part of Project Emily, the base was a launch site for three nuclear-armed PGM-17 Thor intermediate-range ballistic missiles, operated by No. 240 Squadron RAF.

The base closed in March 1964, when the last active unit (which operated the Bristol Bloodhound air-defence missile) withdrew.

=== Squadrons ===
Squadron	Equipment	From	To	To	Notes
No. 78 Squadron RAF	Handley Page Halifax II/III/VI; Douglas Dakota	16 June 1943	20 September 1945	RAF Almaza	
No. 112 Squadron RAF	Bristol Bloodhound I	7 November 1960	31 March 1964	Disbanded	
No. 240 Squadron RAF	PGM-17 Thor	1 August 1959	8 January 1963	Disbanded	
No. 460 Squadron RAAF	Vickers Wellington IV; Handley Page Halifax II; Avro Lancaster I/III	4 January 1942	14 May 1943	RAF Binbrook	

=== Units ===
- No. 20 Blind Approach Training Flight RAF (October 1941) became No. 1520 (Beam Approach Training) Flight RAF (October 1941 - June 1944)
- Sub site for No. 35 Maintenance Unit RAF (November 1945 - June 1951)
- Relief Landing Ground for No. 103 Flying Refresher School RAF (June - November 1951)
- Relief Landing Ground for No. 207 Advanced Flying School RAF (November 1951 - June 1954)
- No. 460 Conversion Flight RAF (May - August 1942 & September - October 1942) became 'A' Flight of No. 1656 Heavy Conversion Unit RAF (October - November 1942)
- No. 2716 Squadron RAF Regiment
- No. 2797 Squadron RAF Regiment

== Current use ==
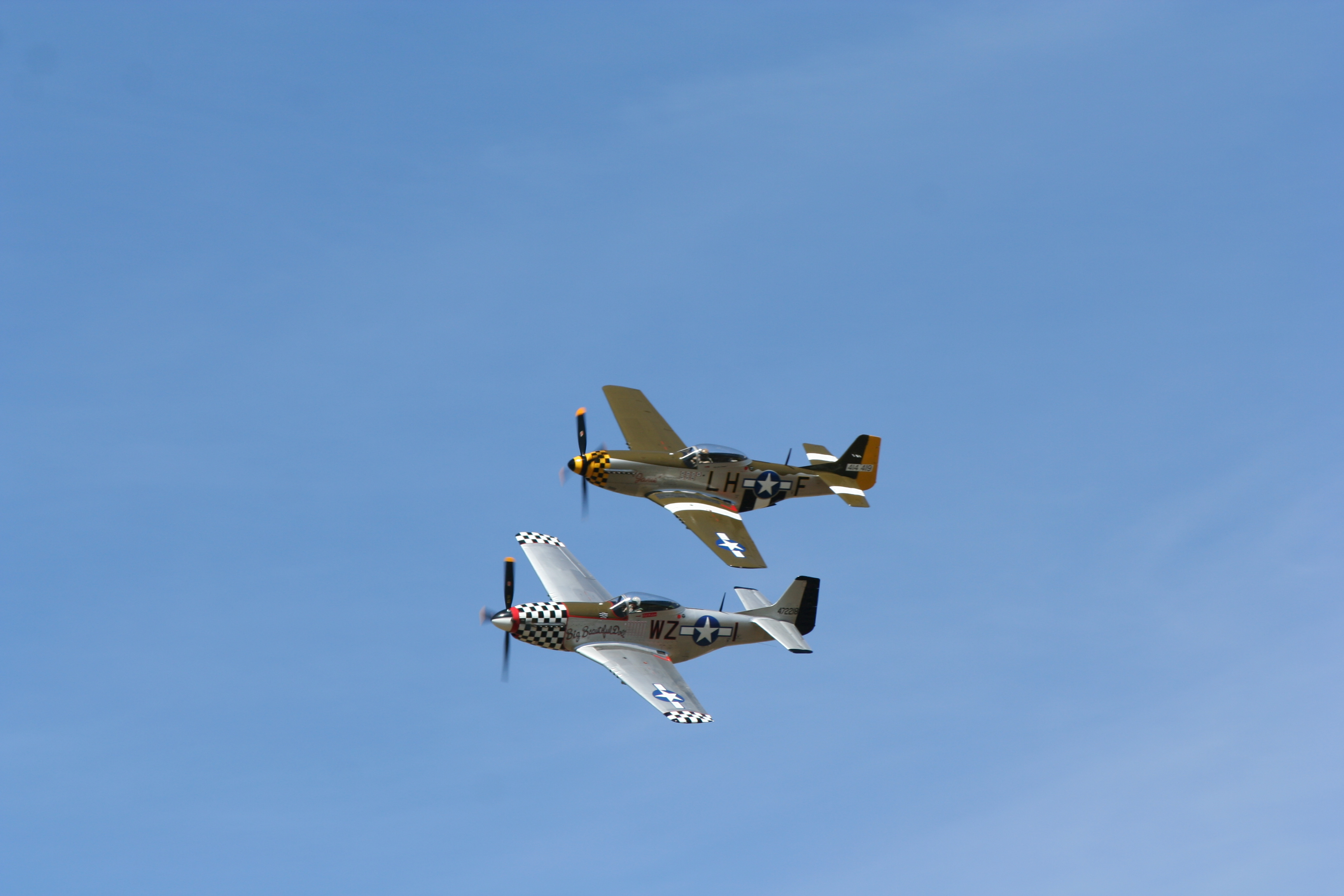
Mustangs flying during Breighton Airshow

The original runways are covered in buildings but the outline of the runways, taxiways and dispersal stands are clearly visible using satellite imagery.

A part of the airfield is currently used by the Real Aeroplane Company to house and maintain private and historic aircraft and a home for the Breighton Flying Club which uses a separate grass runway located within the original airfield grounds.

Five people were injured in a helicopter crash at the airfield on 17 July 2016.
