= Deborah Bowman (ethicist) =

British academic

Deborah Bowman MBE FRSA
- Deborah Bowman's voice from the BBC programme Inside the Ethics Committee, 24 August 2013

Deborah Bowman is a British academic who is Professor of Ethics and Law at St George's, University of London.

Bowman has written widely about medical ethics in both academic and popular publications, including the British Medical Journal, Medical Education, Medical Teacher, Die Psychiatrie, International Journal of Risk and Safety in Medicine and JAMA. Bowman is the author and co-author of books, including a The Worried Student's Guide to Medical Ethics and Law, "Primary Care Ethics" (with John Spicer) and "Informed Consent" (with John Spicer and Rehana Iqbal). She has contributed chapters to many books, including Kumar and Clark "Clinical Medicine" (8th Edition), Principles and Practice of Travel Medicine (2nd Ed) [with Richard Dawood]], "Ethics in Psychiatry: European Contributions", "Clinical Medicine for MRCP PACES: Vol. 2" [with Gautam Mehta and Bilal Iqbal], "The ABC of Clinical Leadership" and "Ethical Perspectives on Capacity and Decision-Making".

Her writing for non-academic publications includes theatre reviews for Times Higher Education, a regular column for the MDDUS magazine "Summons", commentary for national newspapers and personal reflections on learning to play the cello.

Bowman is a commentator on medical ethics, including serving as a regular panellist and programme consultant to BBC Radio 4 Inside the Ethics Committee. She has contributed to a number of radio programmes, including Inside Health, the World at One, Health Check, All in the Mind and Nightwaves for BBC Radio 3. In February 2014, she presented the programme Test Case for BBC Radio 4.

Bowman has a particular interest in the humanities and arts as they relate to medical education. She has written about ways in which the humanities can be integrated into medical education and dedicated her inaugural lecture to the relationship between theatre and clinical ethics. In 2013, Sue Eckstein appointed Bowman as deputy editor of the journal Medical Humanities. Following the death of Sue Eckstein, Bowman was appointed editor-in-chief of Medical Humanities. She is a board member and trustee of London Arts in Health Forum and a member of the International Health Humanities Network. In 2014, she became a Fellow of The Royal Society of Arts. Bowman is a contributor to Medicine Unboxed and recently became the curator for Medicine Unboxed: Students. She has spoken at a number of literary and science festivals, including Sick! and 'The Cheltenham Science Festival'.

Bowman was appointed Member of the Order of the British Empire (MBE) in the 2017 New Year Honours for services to medical ethics. In 2017 she revealed that she was having treatment for breast cancer at the Marsden hospital.
