= Vivienne Parry =

British science journalist and author (born 1956)

Vivienne Parry OBE
- Born: Vivienne Mary Hunt Mills; 4 June 1956 (age 69); Portsmouth, England, UK
- Education: St Swithun's School, Winchester
- Alma mater: Bedford College, London; University College London
- Awards: Suffrage Science award (2011)
- Website: www.vparry.co.uk

Vivienne Mary Hunt Parry OBE (born Vivienne Mary Hunt Mills on 4 June 1956 in Portsmouth) is a British science journalist and author, currently employed as head of engagement at Genomics England. She is most well known for presenting BBC Television science programme Tomorrow's World and Panorama. She is also a regular contributor to The Guardian newspaper's online presence.

== Early life ==
Parry was educated at St Swithun's School, Winchester, an independent girls' school. She studied Zoology at Bedford College, London graduating with a Bachelor of Science degree in 1978, majoring in immunology and genetics which she took at University College London.

== Career ==
Her first job was as National Organiser of the mother and baby charity Birthright, the appeal arm of the Royal College of Obstetricians and Gynaecologists from 1979 to 1994. She worked closely with the charity's Patron, the Princess of Wales, for 12 years.

She briefly served as a trustee of the Princess of Wales Memorial Fund.

She also served as vice chairman of council of University College London and was also a member of Council of the Medical Research Council since 2009. In September 2017, she was appointed to the board of UK Research and Innovation (UKRI).

In 1994, she became a presenter of the BBC TV science programme Tomorrow's World and also reported for Panorama. She left the programme in 1997.

Parry has presented a number of science-based radio shows, including most notably all eight series of Am I normal? and Inside the Ethics Committee. She also presents and writes many other radio programs, including programs for the BBC World Service and BBC Radio 3.

== Publications ==
Her book The Truth About Hormones, published in January 2009, was nominated for the 2006 Aventis Science Prize, now called the Royal Society Prizes for Science Books. Other publications include:

- The Truth About Hormones
- The Real Pregnancy Guide

== Awards and honours ==
Parry received an Honorary Doctorate from Heriot-Watt University in 2012 She won the Suffrage Science award in 2011.

Parry was appointed Officer of the Order of the British Empire (OBE) in the 2011 New Year Honours for services to the public understanding of science.

== Personal life ==
She married Paul Parry in 1978 in Hampshire. They have two sons, and divorced in 2007. In 2012, she married Tim Joss, who died in March 2024.
