= The House of Tiny Tearaways =

British reality television series

- Genre: Reality television
- Presented by: Claudia Winkleman
- Starring: Dr Tanya Byron (series 1–3); Laverne Antrobus (series 4); Elizabeth Kilbey (series 4)
- Country of origin: United Kingdom
- Original language: English
- No. of series: 4

Production
- Running time: 30–60 minutes
- Production company: Outline Productions

Original release
- Network: BBC Three
- Release: 1 May 2005 – 21 December 2007

Related
- The House of Tiny Terrors (U.S. version)

The House of Tiny Tearaways is a British reality television series hosted by Claudia Winkleman with child therapist Tanya Byron that was produced by Outline Productions. It ran for four series, broadcast from May 2005 to December 2007, on BBC Three. Laverne Antrobus and Elizabeth Kilbey took over Byron's role for the final series in 2007.

The show brings three families experiencing problems into a large, purpose-built house where they are monitored and helped for a week. The show is vaguely similar to programmes such as Big Brother - in that all the rooms have cameras in them and the families are frequently monitored in their activities with the audience shown highlights of a particular day.

An American version, filmed at the same location with Byron, was hosted by Karen Duffy in 2006 on TLC.

== Synopsis ==
Each family stays in the house for six days. The first day is spent on monitoring before having very honest and direct discussions with the parents about the issues and how they can be dealt with. The families are then guided through courses of action, exercises and deliberate changes of behaviour on the parents' side to deal with the problems. Tanya does not do this entirely single-handedly, as one element of the programme is the support the parents receive from the other families who are in the house with them at the same time.

The show is characterized by scenes of children misbehaving, therapy sessions between Tanya and the parents of the children (which are often very emotional and are sometimes the first time they've ever really discussed the problems they're facing), tasks in and outside the house which the families are set to help them practice the skills they've learnt (often having to do things they would normally find difficult, like take a child with eating problems to a restaurant). At the end, the families review any improvements or shortcomings.

== Transmissions ==
Series	Start date	End date	Episodes
1	1 May 2005	25 May 2005	27
2	13 November 2005	23 December 2005	42
3	30 April 2006	25 May 2006	25
4	25 November 2007	21 December 2007	20
