= List of unsolved murders in the United Kingdom (1990s) =

This is an incomplete list of unsolved murders in the United Kingdom that were committed between 1990 and 1999. The list excludes any murders in Northern Ireland related to The Troubles (which formally ended in 1998), or are related to IRA bombings that occurred in England.

Victims believed to have been killed by the same perpetrator(s) are grouped together below.

== 1990 ==
| Year | Victim(s) | Location of body or bodies | Notes |
|---|---|---|---|
| January 1990 | William Howe | Worthing, West Sussex | The body of the 63-year-old retired vet was discovered tied up in his flat on 9 January 1990. Because the flat had been ransacked, and because he had tens of thousands of pounds hidden in a safe there (which the offender/s did not find), theft is thought to have been the motive for the killing. In the period leading up to Howe's death, he was tortured by being hit with a hammer and having his back stamped or kneeled on, suffering broken ribs as a consequence. The cause of his death was asphyxia, and it is believed he died the day before police discovered his body. |
| January 1990 | Bridget Brosnan | Stevenage, Hertfordshire | 70-year-old Brosnan died in a hospital's psychiatric ward on 10 January 1990. The nurse who reported the death claimed at first that Brosnan had suffered a cardiac arrest, but later changed her story to say that the deceased had used tights to hang herself from the bedhead. A Home Office pathologist concluded that Brosnan had struggled with an attacker before suffocating to death as a result of being pressed face-down into bedding. Nobody has been tried for Brosnan's murder or manslaughter, but the nurse and a colleague of hers did get convicted of conspiracy to pervert the course of justice. |
| January 1990 | Doris Kellett | Cleckheaton, West Yorkshire | 92-year-old Kellett was hammered to death at her home on 17 January 1990. It is likely that the person who delivered the blows to her head had an accomplice, for a witness reported having seen two men (one with a clipboard) talking to her on her doorstep about 45 minutes before her home help discovered her body. Kellett's pension money was missing from the house, as was a ring and an amber paperweight. There are suspicions that her attacker tricked his way in by pretending to be an official. |
| January 1990 | William Dalziel | Attacked in Acton, London, died in hospital | 61-year-old Dalziel was battered with a heavy object and robbed of his wallet outside a home for the elderly in Edgecote Close during the early hours of 15 January 1990. He died four days later. Because the investigation into the killing of the Shepherd's Bush resident found him to have been a private man who seldom left his flat after dusk, police were not able to establish why he was out in neighbouring Acton at the time he was set upon. |
| January 1990 | Surinder Gill | Hounslow, London | Gill, 33, was an insurance salesman who drove a distinctive modified dark red Mercedes with the index number 16 GLL. He was found stabbed to death in his car in Beavers Open Space, Hounslow, on 30 January 1990. Events surrounding Gill's murder were reconstructed on Crimewatch in April 1990. |
| February 1990 | Brian Fitzmaurice | Liverpool | 48-year-old Fitzmaurice was stabbed to death with a stiletto knife at or near his home in Oxford Road, Huyton, on 3 February 1990. He was attacked at around 12:20 a.m. while walking home from his daughter's residence, which was also in Oxford Road and which he had visited after drinking at a pub in Huyton's Hall Lane. No motive could be found. |
| February 1990 | Richard Humphreys | Body not found | The 51-year-old taxi driver vanished on 3 February 1990 and his Ford Sierra was found abandoned with bloodstains inside it in a car park at Heathrow Airport (some miles from Whyteleafe, the Surrey village where he lived) on 12 February. A forensic re-examination of the car in 2012 did not give detectives the breakthrough they were hoping for. |
| February 1990 | Joseph McEwan | Slough, Berkshire | 38-year-old McEwan was found with bullet wounds to his head at his home in Aldridge Road, Slough. Nine people were arrested over the Valentine's Day killing, but none of them were charged. |
| February 1990 | Kevin Childerley | Mansfield, Nottinghamshire | Intruders armed with weapons attacked 30-year-old Kevin Childerley and his wife as they lay in bed, leading to his death and to her losing the sight in her right eye. Two men were charged with the murder of Mr Childerley and the attempted murder of Mrs Childerley, but a judge directed a jury to acquit the suspects because a medical expert did not believe Mrs Childerley had genuine memories of the attack. |
| March 1990 | Jason Ravenscroft | Telford, Shropshire | Six-week-old Ravenscroft's death on 16 March 1990 was caused by his skull being fractured at his home in Dawley, Telford. A jury cleared his mother's ex-partner of murder and manslaughter in June 1991 after being advised that only the accused or the mother could have been the perpetrator. The accused was cleared of assaulting the mother too but convicted of causing actual bodily harm to Ravenscroft's twin. |
| March 1990 | Jack Royal | Sunniside, Tyne and Wear | Royal, 58, was killed with a shotgun in the porch of his house in Sunniside on 19 March 1990. The former science teacher had himself killed someone in January 1987, although a jury accepted his claim that he had been acting in self-defence and found him not guilty accordingly. In April 1990, a local man was charged with Royal's murder. The 21-year-old's sister had, at the time of his death in 1987, been the partner of the man killed by Royal, and this was viewed as a motive. However, he was cleared in June 1991. In 1993, a second person was tried for Royal's murder. As with the previous defendant, someone close to him having a connection to the man Royal had fatally stabbed (in this case his girlfriend, who was the sister of that man) was viewed as a motive, and he spent nearly 14 years in prison for the murder before his conviction was overturned in 2007. |
| March 1990 | Stephanie Whittaker | Body not found | On 23 March 1990, 34-year-old mother-of-three Whittaker disappeared from the home she shared with her husband in Newport, southeast Wales, reportedly after going out that evening for a drink with a female friend. She never arrived. Although a missing person case, Whittaker's family and friends insisted she would not have left her husband and children, and four years later her disappearance featured on the crime-solving programme Crimewatch, on which it was said to be a case where a crime must be suspected and that detectives feared the worst. She had taken no money, clothes or documents with her. A response to a 2024 Freedom of Information request confirmed that Whittaker was still missing. |
| March 1990 | Alexander Hayden | Edinburgh | 41-year-old Hayden had head injuries from a severe beating when he was found dead under a blanket in a city centre doorway on the morning of 31 March 1990. Detectives received new information in 1996, but it did not result in anyone being charged with the homeless man's murder. |
| April 1990 | Dick Johnson | Lyne, Surrey | 71-year-old Johnson was found dead in his caravan on 20 April 1990, having died of a heart attack during a robbery in which he was tied up. A large stash of expensive tack was found to be missing. |
| April 1990 | Anthony Burrows | Liverpool | 21-year-old Burrows and a friend got into a row with other people on 20 April 1990 after a visit to a nightclub in Speke, Liverpool. Said to have been trivial and over a taxi, the row escalated and led to a man being knocked to the ground, and Burrows and his companions returned to the establishment with a hammer later that night to exact revenge at his friend's instigation. A fight involving more than 10 people then ensued and culminated in Burrows having his neck stabbed with a broken bottle outside the club and bleeding to death from a severed carotid. A man admitted at a trial that he kicked Burrows during the fight and was accordingly sentenced for violent disorder, but the jurors were directed by the judge to acquit the man and his two co-defendants all of murder. |
| April 1990 | Michael Boothe | Attacked in Hanwell, London, died in hospital | Boothe, a 48-year-old actor, was set upon outside a toilet block in Elthorne Park on 29 April 1990. Seven people were arrested and interviewed by police over the attack, but all were released without charge. |
| June 1990 | Nick Whiting | Rainham Marshes, Essex | 43-year-old Whiting, a former car-racing champion, was abducted from his car showroom in Wrotham, Kent, on 8 June 1990 and found dead in a shallow grave on Rainham Marshes a few weeks later. He had been beaten, gagged, tied up, put in the boot of a car and shot, police said. |
| June 1990 | Leonard Gomm | Hampton Gay, Oxfordshire | Gomm, 75, was a taxi driver found stabbed to death in Hampton Gay, between Bletchingdon and Kidlington in Oxfordshire, at 10:50 a.m. on 13 June 1990. His Ford Granada taxi was found five yards away. Gomm had radioed his employers at about 6:35 a.m. that day, telling them he was taking a passenger to Bicester. Police believe he picked up the fare from Gloucester Green, Oxford. Two witnesses saw the victim driving his taxi with a passenger at around that time. No money or valuables were taken from Gomm or his taxi, making the motive for his murder a mystery. On the 20th anniversary of the murder, Thames Valley Police reported the uncovering of new forensic evidence which could lead them to the killer. |
| June 1990 | Trevaline Evans | Body not found; disappeared from Llangollen, Denbighshire | 52-year-old Evans vanished from the antiques shop she ran after leaving a note on the door that said she would be "back in 2 minutes". Her case is treated as an unsolved murder by North Wales Police and her husband was arrested in 2001 but later released without charge. |
| June 1990 | Patricia Lee Parsons | Upshire, Essex | Though an arrest over Parsons's murder was made in 2007, the case has since gone cold again. The 43-year-old was a masseuse who ran a sauna in London, and reputedly had a judge and a TV presenter among her clients. When Parson's body was found in her car near Epping Forest on 24 June 1990, there were three head wounds caused by the bow of a crossbow, along with injuries suggesting she was beaten prior to her death. Police thought that her blue diary would contain clues as to who killed her, but it has never turned up. |
| July 1990 | Baldev Singh Hoondle | Clapton, London | 48-year-old Hoondle was shot dead as two men tried to rob his off-licence on Lower Clapton Road, Clapton, on 22 July 1990. A man with impaired mental capacity confessed to the shooting to police but claimed afterwards to have felt pressured into doing so, and appeal judges sitting in 2024, while rejecting allegations of police bullying, quashed his convictions for murder and conspiracy to rob due to fresh evidence casting doubt on the reliability of his confessions. The man was linked to the slaying partly because a baseball cap bought by him was found near the off-licence. Another man pleaded guilty to conspiracy to rob but was cleared of murder, and he told various people over the years that the man who was convicted of murder was not his accomplice in the raid. |
| August 1990 | Ann Heron | Darlington, County Durham | The 44-year-old mother-of-three had her throat cut on 3 August 1990 while sunbathing outside Aeolian House, her family home on the outskirts of Darlington. Her husband Peter found her body that day and was charged with her murder in 2005, but the case against him collapsed. Nobody else has been charged. |
| August 1990 | Bill Webster | Attacked in Yalding, Kent, died in hospital in East Grinstead, Sussex | 60-year-old Webster, a retired woodcutter, was covered in burning petrol and died after his house had two firebombs thrown into it on 7 August 1990. Police were questioning two men and a youth about the incident two days later. |
| August 1990 | Brian Adams | Derby | 48-year-old Adams was shot twice outside his home in Alvaston, Derby, after returning there on his motorcycle on 14 August 1990. Police had interviewed over 4,500 people about the murder by its second anniversary. |
| August 1990 | Paul Stevens | Hayes, London | 30-year-old Stevens was hit on the back of the head with a blunt instrument at least twice and then dumped in the Grand Union Canal at Hayes on 23 August 1990. He was homosexual and very effeminate, and one theory was that he was killed in a homophobic attack (no robbery occurred). In 2002 the police asked for help in tracing a man who was about 25 and drank in the Tankerville pub (Stevens also drank there on the evening before he was killed), saying he was athletic, over 6 ft tall and had blond hair. He was believed to have been Australian or a New Zealander. The case featured on Crimewatch. |
| August 1990 | Frank Harris | Leeds | 25-year-old Harris was stabbed to death at a street party on 27 August 1990 following an argument about a sound system. The murder, which a Birmingham man went on trial for but was not found guilty of, happened not long after the West Indian Carnival (an event that has taken place in Leeds annually since 1967) had officially ended and just hours before Sedley Sullivan and Rachel Soloman were fatally shot in the same street – a street fairly close to where people had earlier been enjoying the carnival proper. Two men were sentenced for manslaughter over Sullivan and Soloman's deaths. |
| September 1990 | Gail Whitehouse | Wolverhampton, West Midlands | 23-year-old Whitehouse, a mother-of-two, was strangled and her body left in bushes in Wolverhampton's red-light district. In 1993, David Williams was acquitted of her murder but sentenced for six rapes, an attempted rape and two indecent assaults. |
| September 1990 | Andrew Pilch | Elsing, Norfolk | 34-year-old Pilch's wife reported having found him dead at their cottage in Church Street, Elsing, on 13 September 1990, and it was believed he had died from natural causes until a pathologist discovered he had been strangled. Three men were cleared of murder. |
| September 1990 | Arif Roberts | Tottenham, London | 15-year-old Roberts was set upon by a group of Vietnamese teenagers and stabbed in the neck near his school – Gladesmore Community School in Tottenham – on 21 September 1990. The attack stemmed from a playground row over a football the day before – a row that led to two black boys giving a Vietnamese boy a beating. Although a Vietnamese teenager from the Woolwich area of London was charged with Roberts's murder, his trial was discontinued because three girls who witnessed the crime failed to pick him out in a photograph. The court was told that Roberts was an "innocent bystander" singled out for being black, and that Vietnamese pupils seeking revenge for the previous incident recruited other Vietnamese youths, including the defendant, for back-up. |
| September 1990 | Brendan Carey | Islington, London | 47-year-old Carey was shot five times at the Prince of Wales pub on Caledonian Road, Islington, on 26 September 1990, and the culprits – two men in crash helmets – left on a motorcycle. It was a killing that police thought was ordered in the wake of criminals falling out over money made from an armed robbery or drug dealing. |
| September 1990 | Andrew Bedford | Body not found | Bedford went missing on 28 September 1990. He lived in Huntingdon and was last seen in Ramsey, and it is thought by detectives that he is likely to have been shot. In 2015, Cambridgeshire Constabulary began reinvestigating the disappearance of the 27-year-old, but a police spokesman said in 2020 that the case was now in the hands of a cold case team as there were no more lines of inquiry to pursue. |
| October 1990 | Lawrence Bannister | Plymouth, Devon | On 18 October 1990, 45-year-old Bannister died at Derriford Hospital in Plymouth six weeks after he had suffered an assault, apparently at his lodgings on Apsley Road. A man accused of carrying out the assault because the landlord had asked him to evict Bannister (who was of no fixed abode) from the property was acquitted in March 1992. |
| October 1990 | Judith Gold | Hampstead, London | On 20 October 1990, a newspaper boy found the body of 51-year-old financial adviser Judith Gold, also known as Judith Silver, yards from her own home after she left dressed for a business meeting. She had received several blows to the left side of her face from an unidentified weapon. Police reviewed Gold's case following serial killer Levi Bellfield's 2008 convictions for the murders of two women in southwest London, as they suspected it could be one of a number of unsolved attacks on women for which he was responsible. |
| November 1990 | Derrick Johnson | Canning Town, London | On 6 November 1990, 39-year-old Johnson stayed behind late at Leapfield Maritime Limited – a business on Lanrick Road, Canning Town – and suffocated to death in his office after being tied up with a rope and having clear adhesive tape wrapped very firmly around his nose and mouth while a burglary was going on there. He was the financial director of the business. |
| November 1990 | Leslie Jackson | Blackburn, Lancashire | 70-year-old Jackson, a widower and retired horse dealer living in a sheltered bungalow in Sussex Drive, Blackburn, was found beaten to death in his bathroom on 19 November 1990, and a watch and gold sovereign rings were missing. He was last seen alive on the morning of 17 November. Jackson's niece and two men were charged with murder in 2000, but one of the men had no evidence offered against him, while the charges against the two others were dismissed pre-trial. |
| November 1990 | Richard Barry | Hampstead, London | 25-year-old Barry, a Welshman studying in London, was hit about the head with a two-foot piece of wood as he walked along Rosslyn Hill, Hampstead, in the early hours of 18 November 1990. Before he died from his injuries at the nearby Royal Free Hospital on 20 November, he claimed to have been attacked by three men and to have been demanded money by a man outside a tube station. |
| November/December 1990 | Patrick Hurling | Hertford | 45-year-old Hurling arrived home from work at approximately 11:00 p.m. on 30 November 1990 and was found beaten and strangled to death there early the next day. Charges did not follow any of the three arrests made in the hunt for the accountant's killer(s). |
| December 1990 | Jan Mohammed | Bradford, West Yorkshire | On 20 December 1990, Mohammed was battered about the head with a blunt instrument in his house in Manningham by a culprit or culprits who then left the property with it locked. The victim, a 63-year-old widowed grandfather, was asleep on the sofa when the attack began. |
| December 1990 | Steven Johnson | Mow Cop, Cheshire/Staffordshire border | Insurance salesman and part-time taxi driver Johnson, 25, was last seen on 22 December 1990 at 3:30 a.m., collecting a fare in Hanley and bound for Packmoor. A dog walker discovered his body 20 yards from his taxi four hours later. His throat had been cut, and none of his takings appeared to be missing. |
| December 1990 | Edna Kilbride | Leeds | 70-year-old Kilbride was found dead at her home in Parkway Vale, Seacroft, Leeds, on 30 December 1990. She had died the previous day and suffered facial injuries. |

== 1991 ==
| Year | Victim(s) | Location of body or bodies | Notes |
|---|---|---|---|
| January 1991 | Maria Requena | Leigh, Greater Manchester | 27-year-old Requena went missing on New Year's Day 1991, and her remains were found on 6 January in five plastic bin bags in the lake at Pennington Flash. Requena was a sex worker and Pennington Flash is less than two miles from where the body of Linda Donaldson was found in 1988. A link with Donaldson's murder has been suggested, as has a link with the 1994 murder of Julie Finley. Police have investigated prostitute killer David Smith as a suspect in both Requena and Donaldson's cases. |
| January 1991 | Wendy Gallagher | Barnsley, South Yorkshire | 24-year-old Gallagher was last seen in Barnsley town centre on 18 January 1991. Her body was found at her home in Princess Street three days later. She had been strangled with an electrical cord. Police announced on the 30th anniversary of the discovery of Gallagher's body that items from the crime scene would be re-examined for previously undetected DNA traces. |
| February 1991 | John Green | Poole, Dorset | Green, 36, suffered a frenzied stabbing in the office adjoining his shop, and his fiancée found his body there the next day. He was not known to have had any enemies, causing police to wonder if he had been murdered in a case of mistaken identity. Two men seen pushing Green into the shop on 1 February (the day of the killing) remain untraced. |
| February 1991 | Janine Downes | Shifnal, Shropshire | The body of 22-year-old Downes, a sex worker and mother-of-three last seen in Wolverhampton's red-light district, was found close to Lamberts Restaurant on the road between Shifnal and Wolverhampton on 2 February 1991. She had been strangled and had extensive head injuries, and some of her clothes were missing. Police believe Downes may have been a victim of Alun Kyte. |
| February 1991 | Cheryl Shackleton | Brockley, London | 34-year-old Shackleton was found beaten to death in Telegraph Hill Park on 3 February 1991. Her handbag was missing, and police believe she may have been sexually assaulted. It was not known why Shackleton was in Brockley, as she had no ties to the area. She lived an itinerant lifestyle and carried all her belongings in a suitcase, which was never traced. Shackleton's murder was featured on Crimewatch in February 1991 and April 2006. |
| February 1991 | Anthony "White Tony" Johnson | Cheetham Hill, Manchester | Johnson, nephew of moors murders victim Keith Bennett and known as "White Tony" to avoid confusion with a black associate who was also called Tony, was a 22-year-old gangster shot dead in the Penny Black pub's car park on 22 February 1991. A companion was shot as well, but not killed. Desmond Noonan was tried for Johnson's murder twice (along with other defendants), and the prosecution claimed that the offence had been motivated by a robber's threat to complain to Johnson after being told by Noonan that only half of £80,000 entrusted to him – the robber's share of £362,000 from an armed raid – was left. However, each trial collapsed due to a hung jury. Johnson had embarked on a life of crime within a few years of leaving school. |
| March 1991 | Anthony Gorman | King's Lynn, Norfolk | 27-year-old Gorman was found dead in Chapel Street, King's Lynn, during the early hours of Saturday 2 March 1991 after he was assaulted at the nearby Cellar Bar. Three men had murder charges reduced to manslaughter before being told they now faced no charges at all in relation to the assault. A broken nose was the most serious of Gorman's injuries, and it was disclosed later in 1991 that police dropped the charges because it was not certain that that injury or any other directly caused his death, with fright or a heart condition possibly being what did kill him. |
| March 1991 | Gordon Rogers | Guildford, Surrey | Rogers was shot in the leg on 21 February 1991 as he attempted to stop robbers stealing money from the bank in Guildford where he worked as a security guard. £25,000 in cash was taken by them, and the 63-year-old victim succumbed to his injuries at the town's Royal Surrey County Hospital two weeks later. |
| March 1991 | Ahmet Abdullah | Walworth, London | Jurors cleared two brothers of the murder of Abdullah, a 30-year-old Turkish drug dealer who was shot on 11 March 1991 – first inside a Walworth betting shop, then again in the street after leaving the building. |
| March 1991 | Duncan Clift | Struck by a car in Hexham, Northumberland, died in hospital in Newcastle | Clift, a 27-year-old Kent Police officer who had travelled to Northumberland to visit family, was standing in front of a car in a bid to prevent theft of the vehicle when its driver purposely ran him down. He died on 24 March 1991 – two days after the incident, which happened in a car park. A jury found a man not guilty of Clift's murder or manslaughter. |
| March 1991 | Peter Rasini | Palmers Green, London | 44-year-old Rasini was shot outside his home with a .45-calibre automatic pistol on 24 March 1991. A tall and heavily built man then ran away and left in a van parked nearby. Rasini was an antiques dealer and his home was in River Avenue, Palmers Green. |
| April 1991 | Alan Leppard | Monkton, Kent | 43-year-old Leppard was shot in the chest on 1 April 1991 (Easter Monday) after answering a knock on the door. Brenda Long, his partner, heard the bang and rushed to the door to find out the cause of it. She was also murdered at home almost nine months later. With no evidence that either of them had done anything illegal or was prone to making enemies, the reasons for the killings remain as much a mystery as the identities of the persons behind them. |
| April 1991 | Jo Ramsden | Near Lyme Regis, Dorset | Ramsden, 21, went missing from Bridport, Dorset, on 9 April 1991. She was last seen with an unknown male who was nicknamed "Mr Zig Zag" by the press due to the patterned sweater he was described as wearing. Ramsden's body was found in the same clothes she wore on the day she went missing, in woodland by the A35 near Lyme Regis, by two forestry workers on 12 March 1992. A former psychiatric nurse from Charminster, Dorset, was sentenced at the Old Bailey to nine concurrent terms of life imprisonment on 10 February 1994 for the kidnap, rape and attempted rape of a number of disabled women. He was also charged with the kidnap of Ramsden; however, due to insufficient evidence, the case was dismissed at a pre-trial hearing. |
| April 1991 | Carl Stapleton | Manchester | 17-year-old Stapleton was killed with a machete in Moss Side, Manchester, on 29 April 1991. Four men were charged, but they walked free from court after the prosecution offered no evidence. |
| May 1991 | Glenda Potter | Rochester, Kent | 31-year-old Potter was strangled and her body left near the United Reformed Church in Crow Lane, Rochester, in May 1991. She was a sex worker and her case featured on Crimewatch. Police re-examined the case in 2010, stating that they had DNA from the scene. |
| June 1991 | Alison Shaughnessy | Battersea, London | 21-year-old Shaughnessy was stabbed over 50 times on the stairway to her flat in Battersea on 3 June 1991. Two sisters were convicted of murdering the bank clerk and sentenced to life imprisonment in July 1992, but in June 1993, aged 22 and 19, they had their convictions quashed. The older sister and Shaughnessy's husband had formerly been having an affair (though both claimed it had ended by the time of the killing – something the police did not accept), and the accusation at trial was that that sister, fuelled by jealousy, had knifed Shaughnessy while the younger sister stood guard. Used as evidence against the older sister was an entry from her 1990 diary stating that her "dream solution would be for Alison to disappear, as if she never existed". |
| June 1991 | Penny Bell | Perivale, London | 43-year-old Bell, a businesswoman and mother-of-two, was found dead in her car in the car park of Gurnell Leisure Centre by two women who initially thought she was asleep. She had been stabbed 50 times as she sat behind the wheel of the vehicle. |
| June 1991 | Lynne Trenholm | Chester | Trenholm, 29, was found stabbed to death in Pinky's massage parlour in Boughton, Chester, on 9 June 1991. Despite the recovery of an unexplained fingerprint from the scene, the police have no suspects and appeals are still made in an effort to solve her murder. |
| June 1991 | Sandy Drummond | Fife, Scotland | 33-year-old Drummond was found dead on a farm track close to the home he shared with his brother – an isolated cottage near St Andrews, Fife – on 24 June 1991. In the days previous, Drummond withdrew a large amount of his life savings from various building societies, although the money was later found in the house. He also resigned from his job four days prior to his death. On the day itself, he was seen running from his house to fields opposite, carrying a blue sports bag which has never been found. A man with a blood-stained bandage wrapped around his hand was seen at approximately 2:30 p.m. that day on a bus near to Drummond's cottage. This man was never traced. Several times before Drummond's death (and twice on the actual day, according to some reports), a red or orange Morris Marina was seen parked outside the cottage, but it is still unknown who owned this car or who was visiting him. Drummond's death was regarded as natural until neck injuries were discovered during the post mortem examination. |
| July 1991 | Alan Brooks | Loughton, Essex | Former international boxer Brooks, 53, died on 16 July when a gang stabbed him at one of the two Loughton pubs he ran with his wife. A suspected motive was retaliation for him having barred a group of men from one of the establishments the previous week. |
| July 1991 | Sheila Egner | Nottingham | 62-year-old Egner was hit over the head repeatedly with a bottle or hammer at Yeomans Army Stores, Mansfield Road, Nottingham, while at work there on 26 July 1991, and the till drawer, which contained about £250, was then wrapped in green curtain and carried off. The drawer was found dumped and empty in a garden in Basford the following day. Several witnesses saw a man walking off with the drawer wrapped in the curtain; he was described as being between 40 and 50 years old, meaning he would be in his 70s or 80s as of the 2020s. |
| August 1991 | Nancy Carpenter | Hemel Hempstead, Hertfordshire | 30-year-old Carpenter was stabbed as she attempted to break up a street fight in Hemel Hempstead on 3 August 1991. A man faced a second trial for Carpenter's murder after appealing against the guilty verdict returned at the previous one, which concluded in July 1992. He denied killing her and was cleared when the second trial concluded in March 1994. |
| August 1991 | David Brindle and Stan Silk | Walworth, London | Brindle, 23, and Silk, 47, died when two masked men started shooting in The Bell, a pub on East Street in Walworth, on 3 August 1991. Brindle had a brother who had recently been charged with the March 1991 murder of Ahmet Abdullah, and the gunmen shouted "This is for Abi" as they fired their weapons. Another brother was later charged too, but both were acquitted of Abdullah's murder in May 1992. |
| August 1991 | Sharon Hoare | Fulham, London | Hoare moved from Bristol to London, where she worked as a sex worker for escort agencies. Her flatmate found her body in her bedroom at their home in Brompton Park Crescent, Fulham. She had been strangled and bludgeoned. Her boyfriend was questioned but released without charge. On 16 August 1991, six days after 19-year-old Hoare had been killed, another sex worker was attacked at her home in nearby Kensington, and it was thought the two incidents were connected. A link has been suggested between Hoare's murder and Anthony Hardy, the "Camden Ripper". |
| August 1991 | Brendan Penn | Bradford, West Yorkshire | Father-of-three Penn, 22, was stabbed in the heart after running into a group of people already involved in a street affray. A detective later noted that he thought there were people with important information about the murder who were unwilling to come forward because they wrongly believed Penn to have been an aggressor. |
| August 1991 | Arthur Thompson | Glasgow | Arthur Thompson was the 31-year-old son of the Scottish gangster with the same name and died outside his parents' home on 17 August 1991 when a car pulled up there and an occupant or occupants of the vehicle shot him. A man was found not guilty of the murder. |
| August 1991 | Andrew Elphick | Body not found | 21-year-old Elphick's disappearance began to be treated as murder in 1995. Elphick was last seen in Brookwood, Surrey, on 23 August 1991, and his car was found abandoned in Slough – approximately 18 miles away – the following day. He worked in a shop in Woking and lived in Normandy. Three men were arrested in 1995, but no charges were brought against any of them. |
| August 1991 | Vera Anderson | Warrington, Cheshire | 42-year-old Anderson's body was found in her Ford Cortina in Tannery Lane, Penketh, Warrington, on 25 August 1991. Her throat had been cut. Anderson had left her seven-year-old son with a neighbour and driven off in the car the previous evening after receiving a phone call to her house in Hadfield Close, Widnes. It was not expected that she would be gone for long. |
| August 1991 | Nicholas Hanscomb | London | 38-year-old Hanscomb died in hospital during the early hours of 26 August 1991 after a member of a group of youths stabbed the scientist in the groin at the Notting Hill Carnival. Part of Hanscomb's work as a scientist was to help develop the DNA genetic fingerprint test. |
| September 1991 | Brenda Cross | Attacked in Chelsea, London, died in hospital | 73-year-old Cross was beaten with two antique fire irons in the basement of Anno Domini, the antiques shop she worked in, on 4 September 1991. Police said she had put up a heroic struggle against her attacker. The shop's owner was tried for murder but acquitted on the order of the judge, who had stated that the evidence showed it was "inherently improbable" that he was the killer. The owner had allegedly been in a bad mood because Cross was planning to quit and he had not found a replacement, and because he had had to pay £40,000 in back rent and new lease arrangements and the business was not doing well. He was a retired actor and had appeared in the hospital soap opera Emergency Ward 10. |
| September 1991 | Andrew Smith | Glasgow | 23-year-old Smith was discovered stabbed to death beside the Forth and Clyde Canal at Maryhill soon after midnight on 10 September 1991. Police suspected a man called Mark Vass to have been the assailant but never had enough evidence to charge him with the crime. Vass was later shot twice in the legs and then in the head by Eamonn Docherty, who pled guilty to the murder of Vass in 1996. |
| September 1991 | Sarah Bowdler | Walsall, West Midlands | Widowed charity worker Bowdler, 68, was found strangled in her bedroom at her house in Somers Road, Pleck, Walsall, on 17 September 1991. Nothing was missing, no motive unrelated to theft was established, and the absence of signs of forced entry suggested that she let her killer in. |
| September 1991 | Bobby Glover and Joe Hanlon | Glasgow | 31-year-old Glover and 23-year-old Hanlon were two of three men due to stand trial for the August 1991 murder of Arthur Thompson Jnr when they were shot dead on the night of 18 September 1991. Their bodies were left near a Shettleston pub after the killings – killings thought to have been carried out in revenge for the murder they were suspected of involvement in. |
| October 1991 | The Bolney Torso | Bolney, Sussex | A body was discovered in woodland off Broxmead Lane in Bolney, Sussex, on 11 October 1991. The head and hands had been removed and the victim was never identified. Police gave a revised description of him in March 2009: He was between 5 feet 6 inches (1.68 m) and 5 feet 8 inches (1.73 m) tall, well built and aged 35–45. Police also issued pictures of his clothing, including a light blue shirt with a distinctive motif on its pocket. |
| October 1991 | Mark Burnett | Vauxhall, London | 27-year-old Burnett and two other people were hit by bullets fired from a handgun at The Podium, 1 Nine Elms Lane, Vauxhall, on 13 October 1991, but the others were not injured fatally. Jamaican musician Capleton was performing at the venue that night; but despite the concert's high turnout, the information the police received was not sufficient for them to determine a motive or to file any murder charges. |
| October 1991 | Diane McInally | Glasgow | 23-year-old McInally was last seen getting into a car with two men in Cadogan Street, Glasgow, on 15 October 1991. Her body was found in woodland in the city's Pollok Park and she had been strangled. Two men were charged with the sex worker's murder, but there was not enough evidence for either to stand trial. In 2017, McInally's son called for the investigation into his mother's murder to be reopened, claiming he had new evidence. |
| October 1991 | Barbara Finn | Body not found | 33-year-old Finn vanished from her usual area of work in Hillfields, Coventry, on 28 October 1991. The sex worker took a prescription of methadone and it is unlikely that she would not have come home for more. Police suspect that Finn, along with fellow Hillfields sex worker Marie Garrity, who disappeared in 1995, may have been a victim of known prostitute killer Alun Kyte, the "Midlands Ripper". It has been noted that Finn disappeared at about the same time as another woman, Nicola Payne, vanished from Coventry, although it has also been highlighted that their lifestyles were completely separate and it is believed their cases are not connected. |
| October 1991 | Darren Samuel | Manchester | 19-year-old Samuel was shot dead at the Cottage Bakery in Moss Side, Manchester, on 29 October 1991. Two men were cleared of the offence when a potential trial witness failed to attend court. |
| November 1991 | Dave Rowbotham | Manchester | 33-year-old Rowbotham, a former member of the bands The Durutti Column, The Mothmen and Motivation, was axed to death in his flat on Grangethorpe Drive, Burnage, early in November 1991. |
| November 1991 | Sharon Tyler | Tilney All Saints, Norfolk | 24-year-old Tyler was knifed to death in the kitchen of her home in Tilney All Saints on 12 November 1991. Hairs found in her hand not being tested as well as they could have been, together with a forensic expert's case notes being altered and his failure to treat two bloodstains on the murder weapon separately, meant that a neighbour's murder conviction was later deemed unsafe, and he was retried and acquitted. (It had not been possible to retest the hairs as they had been destroyed since the initial trial.) |
| December 1991 | Jim Morrison | Aldwych, London | Detective Constable Morrison, 26, was off duty on 13 December 1991 when he attempted to arrest a man suspected of stealing bags from pub customers. He chased the subject from Covent Garden to Aldwych, where he was stabbed three times. A reward of £30,000 was offered on the 30th anniversary of the crime. |
| December 1991 | Nicola Payne | Body not found | 18-year-old Payne went missing from the Henley Green area of Coventry on 14 December 1991. She had a six-month-old son and was on her way to her parents' house from her home in the city's Winston Avenue at the time of her disappearance. Police began a search of Coventry parkland in June 2012 after being given new information. While the search was ongoing, two local men were arrested on suspicion of conspiring to prevent a lawful burial. The following day, the search was called off. In January 2015, two brothers-in-law – men other than those arrested in June 2012 – were charged with Payne's murder, but on 16 November, they were unanimously found not guilty. A tent which had appeared to reveal scientific evidence against them had been stored in uncertain conditions for a month and cross-contamination was therefore possible. |
| December 1991 | Agnes Ogden | Mytholmroyd, West Yorkshire | Ogden was an 88-year-old widow with a house on Erringden Road in Mytholmroyd. A neighbour saw her at about 4:30 p.m. on 18 December 1991, and sometime between that point and 9:00 a.m. the next day, a pane of glass was removed from her back door, the house was entered illegally and she suffered a blow to the face before being suffocated. Ransacking occurred at the property too, but whether the culprit(s) took anything from there was not determined. |
| December 1991 | Brenda Long | Whitstable, Kent | Because there was a suicide note next to the bath in which 41-year-old Long's body was found on 28 December 1991 and an empty pill pot was in the bath as well, foul play was not suspected to begin with, but a pathologist's examination of the body revealed that someone had caused her to fall unconscious by holding an ether-soaked pad over her nose before drowning her. The murder followed that of Long's partner Alan Leppard in April of the same year, and his is also still unsolved. |
| December 1991 | Kathleen Waugh | Derwent Reservoir, Derbyshire | Waugh, a 41-year-old woman with an intellectual disability, was discovered to be missing from Knowl House care home, in Ashton-under-Lyne, Greater Manchester, on the morning of 28 December 1991. Her body was found seven weeks later in a reservoir nearly 25 miles away. One of the officers of the home was arrested then released; she denied all charges against her. Waugh's murder was explored in March 1996 in Network First: The Killing of Kathleen Waugh – an episode of an ITV documentary series. |

== 1992 ==
| Year | Victim(s) | Location of body or bodies | Notes |
|---|---|---|---|
| January 1992 | Panchadcharam Sahitharan | Attacked in Manor Park, London, died five days later | Sahitharan, a 28-year-old Tamil refugee, died on 3 January 1992 after a gang armed with baseball bats beat him in a racist attack on 29 December 1991. Two men were charged with murder, but one had the charge dropped and the other was acquitted. |
| January 1992 | Perry Wenham | Ipswich, Suffolk | Two men were charged with 30-year-old Wenham's murder, but the judge at their trial ruled in their favour, describing the case against them as "deplorably weak". The case rested mainly on the fact that, on the night of the murder, the men were seen with Wenham in Ipswich town centre when he was still alive before being seen without him and walking away rather quickly from the lane whose church's graveyard his stabbed body was later found in – a lane also in the centre of town. During a police interview, one of the men admitted seeing Wenham get punched to the ground that night but denied hurting him himself in any way. |
| January 1992 | Patricia Hall | Body not found | 39-year-old Hall was a mother-of-two from Pudsey, West Yorkshire, and disappeared after a day out in Ripon, North Yorkshire, on 25 January 1992. A female police officer secretly recorded the missing woman's husband admitting to strangling her and disposing of her body in an incinerator, but a court cleared him of murder in 1994 following a ruling by the trial judge that the taped confession was not permissible evidence. |
| January/February 1992 | Tracy Meade | Grand Union Canal, London | On 20 January 1992, 14-year-old Meade left the flat she shared with her mother in the Paddington area of London after telling her she was going to stay the night at her aunt's. Meade never arrived, and 12 days later her body was recovered from the Grand Union Canal. She had drowned but was found to have been stabbed twice, and detectives suspected a sexual motive as she was only partially dressed and some of her clothes were discovered elsewhere. A reconstruction was featured on Crimewatch in April 1992, but police are no nearer to finding the killer(s). |
| February 1992 | Tony Thompson | Wolverhampton, West Midlands | 29-year-old Thompson, a father-of-two, collapsed on the corner of Park Lane and Second Avenue in Low Hill, Wolverhampton, after he was stabbed in the heart while returning home from a family funeral during the early hours of 25 February 1992. |
| March 1992 | Derek Ure | Greenock, Inverclyde | 21-year-old Ure, a security guard, was shot on 26 March 1992 as an attempt was being made to rob a security van in Greenock town centre. The attempt ended in failure. Two men were acquitted of his murder at a trial where one of them claimed that contact with the vehicle prior to the incident could be why a fingerprint belonging to him was found on a car used to get away from the crime scene. In September 1995, this man – Mark Vass – was himself shot dead. |
| March 1992 | Beatrice Greig | Nottingham | 80-year-old Greig was found battered to death at her home in Loughrigg Close, The Meadows, Nottingham, on 28 March 1992. Greig's daughter was convicted of murder, but the conviction was quashed in 1996 and a retrial ordered. The daughter was convicted a second time at the retrial in 1997 and this conviction was quashed the following year. |
| April 1992 | Jacqueline Palmer-Radford | Eversley, Hampshire | 40-year-old Palmer-Radford was found dead in her kitchen by her elder son on 1 April 1992, having been asphyxiated while he was at school earlier that day. Nothing was stolen from the house and there was no sign of forced entry, leading investigators to consider it likely that the perpetrator was known to her. |
| April 1992 | Michael Schallamach | Body not found | After Schallamach vanished in Southampton, his wife received a letter posted in France and purportedly from a woman he had left her for, but the police, having long been of the opinion that he had been murdered by the time the letter was written, do not believe it was authentic. In 2016, two men jailed in 2005 for killing a family in 2003 were named as prime suspects in the murder of 53-year-old Schallamach. |
| May 1992 | Carl Kennedy | Coventry, West Midlands | Three-year-old Kennedy's body was discovered in undergrowth close to his home in Willenhall after his death earlier on 23 May 1992. A local 17-year-old was found guilty of manslaughter in 1993, the court having been told that he had non-fatally strangled Kennedy with the victim's T-shirt and then, thinking he had killed him despite not meaning to, panicked and beaten his face beyond recognition to try to prevent him from being identified. At an appeal hearing in 1997, however, it was noted that blood on the appellant's golf club might have been collected by him moving and swishing it through bloodstained grass, and a judge, quashing the conviction with two other judges, acknowledged that it was likely that none of Kennedy's injuries had been inflicted with the implement. |
| May 1992 | Amanda Duffy | Hamilton, South Lanarkshire | The body of the 19-year-old Scottish student was found in bushes on wasteland near the car park on Miller Street, Hamilton, during the evening of Saturday 30 May 1992. A pathologist estimated her death to have taken place between six-and-a-half and 18-and-a-half hours prior to the discovery. There were compression marks on Duffy's neck along with branches and twigs in her orifices, and a lack of defensive injuries indicated that she was unconscious when the objects were being inserted into her. |
| June 1992 | Tina Wing | Friern Barnet, London | 31-year-old Wing was strangled to death and stabbed multiple times in the grounds of Friern Barnet Hospital on 28 June 1992. The hospital was a mental health facility whose grounds she had been allowed to have a one-hour unaccompanied walk around to assist in her rehabilitation. Wing's partner was charged with her murder, but witness testimonies were inconsistent and he was cleared. |
| July 1992 | Kevin Fox | Plaistow, London | On 4 July 1992, 42-year-old Fox non-fatally shot two men in the Memory Lane pub on Barking Road in Plaistow before being overpowered, kicked, stabbed, beaten over the head with a fire extinguisher and shot dead with the pistol he had just used. Fox was thought to have been at the establishment that night to settle a feud, and one of the men shot by him there was the landlord's son. |
| July 1992 | John Bowkett | Body not found | 37-year-old Bowkett, who was married and had a two-year-old daughter (as well as two children from a previous marriage), disappeared unexpectedly from his home on Welfare Road, Woodlands, Doncaster, South Yorkshire, on 12 July 1992. Two men were arrested on suspicion of his murder in October 2025. |
| July 1992 | Carolyn Taylor | South Holmwood, Surrey | 54-year-old Taylor's French partner was acquitted of murder in May 1993 when a second jury failed to agree on a verdict. It was alleged that he punched and knifed Taylor at their home in South Holmwood on 15 July 1992 before telling her son that she "has been sleeping around"; but according to the accused, he saw her being knifed by the son after the couple were woken up by him, and then asked him to help him commit suicide. Taylor's partner's defence team claimed that her son and daughter were concerned at the prospect of losing the house and not getting the money they hoped to inherit someday. |
| c. July 1992 | Yvonne Fitt | Lindley, North Yorkshire | Fitt was found dead in woodland near Otley on 12 September 1992 after being stabbed in the chest and back. Her case was featured on Crimewatch that year and in 2019 police appealed to an anonymous caller who provided information following the broadcast to call again. Fitt was a 33-year-old mother-of-one who was a sex worker in Leeds and Bradford's red-light districts, and it is suspected that she was murdered by the killer of Leanne Tiernan. |
| July 1992 | Shawn Hanby | Leeds | Hanby, a 28-year-old from Fitzwilliam in West Yorkshire, was found stabbed to death at a maisonette in the Bramley area of Leeds on 25 July 1992. A woman was charged with his murder and her boyfriend with assisting an offender (the maisonette was the boyfriend's home), but the prosecution offered no evidence at Leeds Crown Court after accepting a submission from her counsel that her alleged admissions were unreliable because of her mental condition. The woman was on prison leave and serving a six-year sentence for manslaughter when Hanby was killed. |
| July 1992 | Christopher Stanley | Hounslow, London | Nine-year-old Stanley lived in St Aubyn's Avenue, Hounslow, and was last seen on 29 July 1992, talking with a friend and a neighbour. His body was found in a wartime pillbox on Hounslow Heath on 30 July; he had been strangled. A man stood trial for Stanley's murder the following year but was acquitted. |
| July 1992 | Helen Gorrie | Horndean, Hampshire | 15-year-old Gorrie was found half-naked and strangled near Merchistoun Hall, Horndean, on 2 August 1992. The hall was in the same village as her home, which she had left three nights previously to see a 21-year-old man. She had also seen him on the night of 29–30 July as he cruised around the area in his vehicle, and he later phoned her to ask her to meet him. This man was convicted of her murder (allegedly committed after she had rebuffed his sexual advances) in 1999, but he was released on appeal in 2003. The police revealed that there were no grounds to reopen the investigation, indicating that they still believed he was responsible, but Gorrie's case is now technically unsolved. |
| August 1992 | Abdul Maneer | Helensburgh, Argyll | Maneer, a 33-year-old waiter, was stabbed and cut open in a lane behind his place of work – a tandoori restaurant in Sinclair Street, Helensburgh – on 4 August 1992. He had spent time in prison for dealing heroin, and the killer(s) might have tried to disembowel him because they believed his body to have drug-filled condoms inside. |
| August 1992 | Michael Towler | Bradford, West Yorkshire | 56-year-old Towler was found fatally stabbed in the living room of his home on Holly Street, Horton Bank Top, Bradford, on 6 August 1992. Neighbours had heard noises coming from the house the previous evening and a man had been seen acting suspiciously nearby. Towler's video recorder was missing. |
| September 1992 | Steven Preston | Body not found | 23-year-old Preston disappeared after waving to his mother as she left their home on Heath Road, Bebington, Wirral, to go to work on 18 September 1992. In 2017 police searched fields close to the M53 motorway at nearby Eastham after a tip-off suggested he could be buried somewhere around where junction 5 of the motorway meets New Chester Road. Police subsequently said they believed he may have been murdered and buried. |
| September 1992 | Barry Dalton | Finsbury Park, London | 38-year-old Dalton, a former bareknuckle prizefighter who managed a minicab firm and reputedly ran protection rackets in London, was shot once in the head whilst at the wheel of his taxi in Newnton Close, Finsbury Park, on 25 September 1992. He was from the East Ham area of the capital and it was not clear whether he went to Finsbury Park that day to collect or drop off a fare or for some other reason. |
| October 1992 | Kevin Coniam | Mansfield, Nottinghamshire | 36-year-old Coniam, a Kent-born lorry driver, was strangled to death on the night of 4–5 October 1992 before his body was left in his Volvo estate car just outside Mansfield. Police believed the slaying was linked to his drug use. |
| October 1992 | Stephen McIntyre | Birmingham | 76-year-old McIntyre's throat was slashed outside a sheltered housing complex during the evening of 19 October 1992. The complex – a block of flats on George Street in Lozells, Birmingham – was where he had been living for the previous six years, and he was found near its entrance by a neighbour. |
| November 1992 | Sher Sagoo | Attacked in Deptford, London, died in hospital | 45-year-old Sagoo, a market trader from Ilford, died in early November 1992 after being attacked at Deptford market in October. Although the attack was reportedly to do with a dispute about parking, a racial motive has nevertheless been alleged. A man was charged with manslaughter following a confession to the police, but because the Crown Prosecution Service found the evidence against him to be in short supply, no trial took place. |
| November 1992 | Natalie Pearman | Norwich, Norfolk | 16-year-old Pearman was strangled and her body dumped in woodland at Ringland Hills, on the edge of Norwich. A lorry driver taking a short cut through Ringland Hills spotted the body in a lay-by at around 3:45 a.m. on 20 November. New information about the case was received in November 2012. A link to serial prostitute killer Steve Wright had been suggested, but in 2017 police revealed they had a full DNA profile of Pearman's murderer and that solving her murder was simply a matter of matching the profile to an individual. |
| November 1992 | Andre Blackman | Stoke Newington, London | 24-year-old Blackman was shot dead on 30 November 1992 during a party at a community hall in Millers Terrace, Stoke Newington. A man who was alleged to have had an argument with him at the party but who denied being there was found guilty of his murder in August 1993, but he appealed the following year and had his conviction overturned after a witness admitted that her memories of the party were hazy and she could not be certain that he did in fact attend. The community hall being dimly lit, the party's disc jockey having no recollection of seeing the appellant there that night and the apparent failure of the trial judge to direct the jury properly as he summed up were also noted at the appeal hearing. |
| November/December 1992 | Harold Smith, Mary Smith and Harold Smith Jnr | Birmingham | Harold Smith, 72, his wife Mary, 73, and their son Harold Jnr, 47, who was paralysed and used a wheelchair, were found murdered in a bedroom of their home in Overbury Close, Northfield, Birmingham, on 2 December 1992. They had been bound, beaten and stabbed with a small knife. Nothing appeared to have been stolen and the motive remains a mystery. Criminal psychologist Paul Britton suggested the offender or offenders were aged between 14 and 25 and had good knowledge of the area. |
| December 1992 | Johanna Young | Watton, Norfolk | 14-year-old Young left her home in Merton Road, Watton, at around 7:30 p.m. on 23 December 1992 and was seen outside her local fish and chip shop an hour or so later. The police were called the following morning because she had not turned up for her paper round, and on Boxing Day her body was found in a water-filled marlpit near where her shoes and underwear had been discarded. An autopsy determined that Young had suffered a fractured skull and drowned. |
| December 1992 | Steven Clark | Body not found | Although Clark, a 23-year-old with disabilities from a childhood road accident, was for many years thought to have last been seen in Saltburn (a small town on the North Yorkshire coast) at around 3:00 p.m. on 28 December 1992, a woman came forward in 2020 to say she had walked past him near his home in Marske later than that time but before nightfall. (Marske is about two miles from Saltburn.) This new piece of information followed the revelation that Clark's parents had recently been arrested on suspicion of his murder and then bailed. Both strongly denied being behind his disappearance. |

== 1993 ==
| Year | Victim(s) | Location of body or bodies | Notes |
|---|---|---|---|
| January 1993 | Benji Stanley | Moss Side, Manchester | 14-year-old Stanley was shot dead whilst in a takeaway with a friend on 2 January 1993. Though police found no evidence to support rumours that he had been involved in the trading of illegal drugs, they did reveal that they believed the shooter might have mistaken him for a drug dealer, and in 2011 disclosed the name of a dealer they thought likely to have been the intended target – someone of similar appearance to Stanley. Another theory is that the intended target was the friend who was with Stanley in the takeaway that day, as Stanley was on the other boy's bicycle and had that boy's jacket on when the gunman struck. |
| January 1993 | Ivan Dunn | Chorleywood, Hertfordshire | 56-year-old Dunn was found dead with serious head injuries in a lay-by early on 7 January 1993. He had no fixed address and the last sighting of him was in the centre of Stratford-upon-Avon in Warwickshire the previous afternoon. Investigators initially believed that Dunn was the victim of a road traffic accident, but it was later established that he was murdered. |
| January 1993 | Kevin Richardson | Middlesbrough | 29-year-old Richardson was shot twice with a sawn-off shotgun before a dog walker found him dead in Park End on 12 January 1993. He had been due to attend Darlington Magistrates' Court on charges of burglary and criminal deception, and a detective said he had not ruled out the slaying being an act of revenge. Magistrates sitting at Guisborough threw out a man's murder charge later that year and he died in 2009 while in prison for a different offence. |
| January 1993 | Arthur Brumhill | Northampton | 76-year-old Brumhill's body was found in the basement of his workplace – a pet shop on Wellingborough Road – by a fellow employee. He had died from several blows to the head inflicted with a tyre iron missing from the premises. The killer is suspected to have escaped out of an upstairs window with a small amount of cash taken. A witness described seeing Brumhill with a man in his late teens with "mousey-brown" hair and about 5 feet 5 inches (1.65 m) tall inside the shop on the evening of the murder. Others described seeing a suspicious-looking man in his 30s in the shop's vicinity. Despite a Crimewatch reconstruction airing in March of that year and an arrest being made in April, the case did not get solved. On 22 January 2013, the day after the 20th anniversary of the murder, police announced that they were reviewing the case and hoped that advances in forensic analysis and DNA profiling would bring the killer to justice. A former colleague of Brumhill's stood trial for his murder but was found not guilty in March 2017. |
| January 1993 | Stacey Queripel | Bracknell, Berkshire | The body of seven-year-old Queripel was found in woodland by South Hill Park on the night of 24 January 1993. She had been strangled with her necklace. It is believed she was murdered elsewhere, because her shoes were clean but the ground where she was found was muddy. Queripel's mother was arrested in connection with her murder but released without charge. |
| February 1993 | Michael White | Grand Union Canal, London | 22-year-old White vanished on 1 February 1993 and was discovered bludgeoned to death in a box seen floating in the Grand Union Canal on 29 May. A mother and daughter whom he had been seeing at the same time were cleared of conspiracy to murder but convicted of conspiracy to pervert the course of justice, as was the husband and father of the female defendants. The court had been told that White had been violent towards the mother. |
| February 1993 | Doris Shelley | Attacked in Martlesham, Suffolk, died at Addenbrooke's Hospital in Cambridge | Concerned for her welfare because she had not answered the door to a woman attempting to deliver shopping to her, a neighbour took the decision to enter Shelley's bungalow by breaking a lounge window. Inside, he found the 82-year-old widow cowering in her kitchen. A blunt instrument had been used to strike her head with considerable force, and she died in hospital 10 days later, on 21 February. |
| February 1993 | Bulic Forsythe | Clapham, London | 42-year-old Forsythe was last seen on 24 February 1993 by colleagues at Lambeth Social Services. There was concern when he did not arrive for work the following day, and that night, his flat at Foster Court, Clapham Park Road, Clapham, was deliberately set on fire. Forsythe's body was found inside the flat by firefighters in the early hours of 26 February, and the cause of his death was a fractured skull. It has been suggested that he was murdered because he planned to expose widespread abuse at Lambeth Council's children's homes. |
| March 1993 | Richard Miles | Stonehouse, Gloucestershire | The 29-year-old panel beater's mother found his body in their back garden during the afternoon of 10 March 1993. He had suffered a single stab wound to the heart in an apparently motiveless incident sometime after arriving home for lunch from his workplace that day. Three men arrested in 2013 – two on suspicion of being Miles's killers, the third on suspicion of perverting the course of justice – all ended up being released without charge. |
| March 1993 | Jean Bradley | Acton, London | Bradley, a 47-year-old businesswoman, was stabbed to death in Carbery Avenue, Acton, on 25 March 1993. A man was charged, but the case against him was dropped. |
| March 1993 | Carol Clark | Sharpness, Gloucestershire | 32-year-old Clark was last seen in Montpelier, Bristol, on 26 March 1993. Her body was found two days later, 30 miles away at Sharpness docks. She had been strangled and her body was partially clothed. Clark had been a sex worker and her case featured on the BBC programme Crimewatch in the summer of 1993. Among those questioned in connection with her murder were convicted killers Alun Kyte and Philip Smith. Police reopened Clark's case in 2023 after receiving "new and significant" information. Two men in their 60s were arrested in April 2023 and March 2024 respectively, but the man arrested in 2024 was ruled out of the investigation in March 2025. The other, however, was rearrested in April 2026. |
| April 1993 | Karen McGregor | Glasgow | 26-year-old McGregor was battered and strangled on 17 or 18 April 1993, and her body was found hidden in shrubbery in the car park of the Scottish Exhibition Centre days later. Her husband stood trial for murder in 1994, but the charge was found not proven. McGregor was a sex worker and links have been suggested between her death and the unsolved murders of other sex workers in Glasgow in the 1990s. |
| April 1993 | Patrick Soraghan | Attacked in Baldock, Hertfordshire, died three weeks later | 46-year-old Soraghan was stabbed during an argument in Station Road, Baldock, on 7 April 1993. The argument was between homeless alcoholics, but the location of the derelict building they lived in and whether it was the crime scene are not clear. |
| May 1993 | Dick Beattie | Renton, West Dunbartonshire | 32-year-old Beattie left his family home in the village of Renton at around 10:00 p.m. on 3 May 1993 and was found dead the next day – slashed and beaten to the point of being unrecognisable – behind a church near the River Leven. It was believed that two or more people overpowered him and bundled him into a van. A man was charged with Beattie's murder before being discharged because the evidence against him was inadequate. This man went on to stab Beattie's brother in a serious but non-fatal incident at the village's Central Bar in November 1993, and in 2013, the suspect's own brother, who was thought to have been complicit in a cover-up to do with Beattie's murder, was jailed for a minimum of 29 years for an arson attack in Helensburgh that killed three people. Beattie was due to be a key witness at a murder trial at the time of his death. |
| May 1993 | Raymond Saunders | Abbey Wood, London | 41-year-old Saunders was shot dead on a caravan site in Abbey Wood on 9 May 1993. Although his common-law wife was due to testify at trial against a man she claimed to have seen pointing a gun at him, she changed her mind about doing so, saying in a letter to the suspect's solicitor that she was "not sure of anything anymore". |
| June 1993 | Jimmy Moody | Hackney, London | 52-year-old James Alfred Moody, known as Jimmy and himself suspected of murder, was shot dead with a revolver in a pub on the fringes of Victoria Park on 1 June 1993. He had been on the run since escaping from prison in 1980. |
| June 1993 | Edna Waller | Sheffield | 79-year-old Waller's death in a Sheffield hospital on 18 June 1993 was an indirect result of violence she suffered while being robbed of her bag and purse three weeks previously. She was found unconscious and bleeding from head injuries at the steps to her home in Bramwell Gardens, Netherthorpe. |
| June 1993 | Tommy Roche | Near Heathrow Airport, London | 42-year-old Roche was shot dead by a motorcyclist on 21 June 1993. He was the minder of fellow murder victim Donald Urquhart, a man killed in January 1993, but police played down suggestions that their deaths were connected. A hitman was jailed for life for shooting 55-year-old Urquhart. |
| June 1993 | Michelle McKnight | Attacked in Tweedmouth, died in hospital in Ashington (both in Northumberland) | 29-year-old McKnight was found with two abdominal stab wounds in the front garden of her house on Prior Road, Tweedmouth, on 27 June 1993. A jury at Newcastle Crown Court acquitted of her murder a man she had recently split up with when she suffered the attack. |
| July 1993 | George Leitch | Redhill, Surrey | 36-year-old Leitch's naked body was found near a landfill site on 30 July 1993 – 28 days after he was last seen. Police acknowledged that he appeared to have had various business interests in clubs and bars in south London, but would not confirm or deny that they thought him being stabbed to death was a gang-related crime. Three men had murder charges against them dropped in 1996. |
| July 1993 | Amanda Duncan | Body not found | Although the body of 26-year-old Duncan has never been found, police are treating her disappearance as murder. Duncan was a sex worker and was last seen in the Portman Road area of Ipswich on 2 July 1993. In 2018, on the 25th anniversary of her disappearance, Suffolk Constabulary issued a new appeal for information. A link has been suggested to serial East Anglia prostitute killer Steve Wright. |
| July 1993 | Javad Iqbal | Brixton, London | 36-year-old Iqbal was stabbed in the back outside his shop in Kent Walk, Brixton, on 9 July 1993. A 22-year-old man who was a cousin of Iqbal's minder was tried for the murder after the minder's lover claimed to have seen him leaving the murder scene while looking out of a window. Her evidence was considered unreliable by the court. |
| July 1993 | Harry and Megan Tooze | Llanharry, South Wales | 65-year-old Harry Tooze and his 67-year-old wife Megan were shot from close range at their home at Ty ar y Waun Farm, Llanharry, on 26 July 1993. Their daughter's boyfriend was convicted of their murders, but the verdict was quickly overturned on appeal. A link has been suggested between the Tooze case and serial killer John Cooper, the man responsible for the Pembrokeshire murders. |
| September 1993 | Mark Jarrett | Crystal Palace, London | 29-year-old Jarrett, a cocaine and cannabis dealer, was shot dead at a flat in Palace Road, Crystal Palace, on 14 September 1993. His best friend then went into hiding, but said after being charged with murder – a charge he would be acquitted of – that he had done so out of fear of the killer. |
| October 1993 | Gurbax Kaur Sandhu | Derby | Sandhu, a 30-year-old mother-of-two, was strangled to death at her home in Randolph Road, Derby, on 19 October 1993. Police wished to hear from anyone who noticed a red car parked in the same road that day. |
| October 1993 | Henry McKechnie | Glasgow | 35-year-old McKechnie was shot dead near his residence in Scapa Street, Cadder, Glasgow, on 29 October 1993. |
| October 1993 | David Clarke | Attacked in Maida Vale, London, died in hospital | 23-year-old Clarke was shot and gold rings were stolen from him in Bravington Road, Maida Vale, on 29 October 1993. A man who was not known to him was cleared of both offences. |
| November 1993 | Kenneth McAllister | Colwyn Bay, Conwy County | 42-year-old McAllister was beaten with an iron bar and died from head injuries in his bedsit in Colwyn Bay on 9 November 1993. A man acquitted of murder in 1994 was sentenced in 2002 for attacking his aunt and uncle with a metal bar at their home. He was said to have told his aunt before the assault that he had already "put one six feet under" and it was now her turn. |
| November 1993 | Karen Hales | Ipswich, Suffolk | 21-year-old Hales was stabbed and her body set on fire at her home in Lavenham Road, Ipswich, on 21 November 1993. The incident was almost certainly witnessed by her 18-month-old daughter. Three people who came to be viewed as suspects – all of whom were violent and involved in drugs and domestic burglaries – have since died. |
| November 1993 | Glenn Ford | Birmingham | Ford, 35, was last seen alive in his home city of Coventry on 22 November 1993 and found shot dead the next day in the yard of a deserted factory in Saltley, Birmingham – apparently after having been lured there. A reopening of the case in 2009 led to four men being charged over his murder in 2010, but police dropped the charges following advice from the Crown Prosecution Service that the chances of a guilty verdict were not high enough to justify putting any of the men on trial. |
| November 1993 | Paul Hamilton | Glasgow | 35-year-old Hamilton was shot as he drove his car in the Riddrie district of Glasgow on 23 November 1993. There has been speculation that it was because he had given an alibi the previous year for the man standing trial for Arthur Thompson Jnr's 1991 murder. |
| November 1993 | Davina McMillan | Body not found | 36-year-old McMillan disappeared on 25 November 1993 from the home she shared with her four-year-old daughter in Godmanchester, Cambridgeshire. She was reported missing a month later by her brother. In 2020 it was reported that police were treating McMillan's case as a murder inquiry, with there being no evidence of her being still alive and her bank accounts not having been touched since the day she vanished. Her family say she would never have left her young daughter and mother and must have been murdered. |
| December 1993 | Adnan Al-Sane | Manchester | The Kuwaiti's headless body was discovered at Piccadilly Station in Manchester on 17 December 1993 and his head in a school playing field at Cheslyn Hay in Staffordshire on 27 January 1994 – parts of England to which he had no links. His home was in the Maida Vale area of London, and it was following a meeting with a Kuwaiti business associate in a Mayfair hotel on 14 December 1993 that he disappeared. Police thought a financial motive was behind the murder of the 46-year-old billionaire and former banker. |
| December 1993 | Paul Logan | Blue House Farm, Northumberland | On 23 December 1993, Logan's workplace, a takeaway in Consett, County Durham, received a call from a nearby phone box requesting the delivery of food to a house in the countryside. With no cause to suspect that the call was not genuine, 25-year-old Logan took the food there, only to be told that no one there had placed the order. Logan was bludgeoned to death soon after he had started to walk away from the house, his body being found by police a few hours later on farmland within its grounds. The police had been called to the farm because the owners had realised that Logan's car had not left. |
| December 1993 | Viv Graham | Attacked in Wallsend, died in hospital in North Shields (both in Tyne and Wear) | 34-year-old Graham was shot after leaving a pub in Wallsend High Street on 31 December 1993. He was well known locally as an organised crime figure and reportedly received a death threat shortly before he was murdered. |

== 1994 ==
| Year | Victim(s) | Location of body or bodies | Notes |
|---|---|---|---|
| January 1994 | Derick Kiley | West Norwood, London | 47-year-old Kiley was stabbed multiple times at his flat on Harpenden Road, West Norwood, on the night of 3/4 January 1994. Although an antique jewelled wristwatch and a black bag with a substantial amount of money in it were missing from the property, police did not think the main objective of the culprit(s) was to commit theft, as there was no sign of forced entry and Kiley's cautious nature meant he would not have let someone in he did not know. A man who ran a pie stall on Crystal Palace Parade claimed that he and Kiley spoke to each other at the stall shortly before the slaying and that Kiley seemed troubled. A woman who lived near Kiley claimed that she heard shouting and a woman's scream coming from the general direction of his flat at around 12:20 that night, but did not see anything suspicious when she went outside to check. |
| January 1994 | Julian Stewart | Manchester | 20-year-old Stewart was shot in the head in Radley Walk, Moss Side, on 12 January 1994. A car then sped away from the scene. The killing was believed to have been a gangland one and happened the month after Stewart's body armour prevented a bullet from hitting him. |
| January 1994 | Sarah Lewin | Huddersfield, West Yorkshire | 35-year-old Lewin was bludgeoned at her home in Bradley Boulevard, Sheepridge, Huddersfield, on 14 January 1994. It is believed that she may have known her killer and her murder could have had a connection to her involvement in the supply of amphetamines. Lewin's brothers made a new plea for information in 2018. |
| February 1994 | Claude Moseley | Stoke Newington, London | 32-year-old Moseley, a former athletics champion, was stabbed with a samurai sword in early February 1994. Gilbert Wynter, who would go missing in 1998 and may himself be a murder victim, was tried for the killing but acquitted following a key witness's refusal to testify. |
| February 1994 | Dorothy Carter | Attacked in Walthamstow, London, died in hospital | A mugger attacked 73-year-old Carter outside her residence as she returned to it on Sunday 6 February 1994 after attending church in Woodford. She died two days later. |
| February 1994 | Danny Ferguson | Bedford | 32-year-old Ferguson was shot in the head at his bedsit on the night of 20–21 February 1994. Five men were acquitted of violent disorder in relation to a fight in the building the day before Ferguson was found slain there, and the fight was believed to be connected with his murder. |
| February 1994 | Larry Burt | Wapping, London | 56-year-old Burt, an artist, quality controller and Red Cross employee from Ramsgate in Kent, was strangled to death with a scarf in the yard of a warehouse in St Katharine's Way, Wapping. The scarf, which did not belong to him, was found at the scene along with his body, but his bicycle, binoculars, wallet, rucksack and camera were missing. Burt had caught a train from Ramsgate to London Victoria station on 26 February 1994 (the day before his body was found) and probably then cycled to the East End to draw and/or paint there. |
| March 1994 | Mehmet Kaygisiz | Islington, London | Kaygisiz, 33, was shot as he played backgammon at a café in Islington on 18 March 1994. Police said at the time that they suspected a link to Britain's Turkish underworld, but documents disclosed in Turkey in 2016 suggested that the killing was ordered by Turkish authorities because Kaygisiz had ties to what they regarded as a terrorist group. |
| March 1994 | Keith Copeland | Birmingham | 35-year-old Copeland was shot dead as soon as he opened the front door of the Plaza Café, an illegal drinking den where he was a doorman, at around 2:20 a.m. on Saturday 19 March 1994. The shooter had two accomplices. An altercation inside there a little while earlier led to a man leaving the premises, and it was thought that Copeland might have been an innocent victim of that man's aggression following his return to the building in Lozells for revenge. A man was acquitted of Copeland's murder in October 1995 – the defence claimed that the charge was a result of misidentification – but convicted in 2005 of the murder of another doorman. |
| March 1994 | Trevor Monerville | Stoke Newington, London | 26-year-old Monerville was stabbed by five men in Trumans Road, Stoke Newington, on 19 March 1994. |
| March 1994 | Josephine Berrington | Wallington, London | 34-year-old Berrington's ex-husband found her dead and naked in her new flat on Good Friday 1994 (1 April). She had been strangled the day before and her bedroom set on fire in an apparent attempt to hide the crime. Berrington had sat as a magistrate at Epsom Magistrates' Court until recently and her ex-husband said he believed she had moved to Wallington to escape a woman she feared would kill her. An electrical engineer was charged, but the case was later dropped. |
| April 1994 | Brian Dunning | Leeds | 53-year-old Dunning was found beaten to death in his home in Trafford Avenue, Harehills, Leeds, on Saturday 16 April 1994. He had last been seen a week previously. Valuable possessions were missing, and the murder seemed to police to have been a consequence of a burglary having gone wrong. |
| April 1994 | Ron Cousins | Chelmsford, Essex | 77-year-old Cousins was stabbed and strangled at his house on Anchor Street, Chelmsford, in mid-April 1994. He was a devout Christian who often let homeless people stay there, and when his body was found in the vandalised property, pages from the Bible had been stuffed into his mouth. A knife was resting on his torso as well, but it was not the one that had been used to attack him. |
| April 1994 | Karen Reed | Woking, Surrey | Reed, 33, was shot on her doorstep at 31 Willow Way, Woking, at 9:15 p.m. on 30 April 1994 when she answered the door to a man pretending to be delivering pizza. The motive for her murder is uncertain, although it has been suggested that it was a case of mistaken identity and that her sister, whose husband had been convicted of murdering two brothers, was the intended target. |
| May 1994 | Dawn Shields | Castleton, Peak District, Derbyshire | 19-year-old Shields, a mother-of-one, was last seen getting into a car in Broomhall, Sheffield, on 14 May 1994. Her body was found buried under rocks at Mam Tor in the Peak District on 20 May. She had been strangled, and her clothing was missing and has never been found. Shields was described by police as leading a "troubled life", having been forced into sex work from the age of 14. The investigation into her murder was reopened in 2019. Links with convicted killer Stephen Griffiths and the murder of Michaela Hague in 2001 have been suggested. However, the prime suspect was prostitute killer Alun Kyte, who had killed two sex workers in December 1993 and March 1994 and was suspected by police of being responsible for many other such murders across Britain. |
| May 1994 | Andrew Trail | Sheffield | 26-year-old Trail was found with stab wounds in the toilets of a blues club in Hallcarr Street, Burngreave, Sheffield, on 14 May 1994. |
| 16 May 1994 | Diane Clark | Gainsborough, Lincolnshire | 51-year-old Clark died when her home on Trinity Street, Gainsborough, was set alight after a burglary. Three people were arrested but not charged with her murder. |
| May 1994 | Mary McKinlay | Motherwell, North Lanarkshire | McKinlay, a 50-year-old schoolteacher, was beaten, raped and stabbed to death in her eighth-floor flat in Motherwell on 21 or 22 May. A subsequent inspection there revealed no signs of forced entry. Police charged a neighbour, but the charges were found not proven at his trial. There were claims that the Crown case ended abruptly, and the trial also came under criticism because the accused's girlfriend was not summoned to it to give evidence about her part in his alibi. |
| May 1994 | Ken and May Murrells | Harlington and Hayes, London | 51-year-old Ken Murrells and his 47-year-old wife May were stabbed and then found dead in different places. May was found inside their house in Hayes on 31 May 1994 after her son and sister had broken in because she had not been in touch for over 24 hours, while Ken, a former police officer, was found beside his car in nearby Harlington early on 1 June. |
| June 1994 | Selhouk Behdjet | Holloway, London | 58-year-old Behdjet, a drug trafficker, was discovered stabbed to death at his flat on Hornsey Road, Holloway, on 24 June 1994. A man was charged with murder in 2012, but at a pre-trial hearing in 2014, the Crown Prosecution Service announced its decision to abandon the case. The deaths of key witnesses and the unreliability of those still alive were given as the reasons, but it later emerged that the likelihood of police inquiries being tainted by corruption – an officer was at the scene of Behdjet's murder before a 999 call was made – also played a part in the decision. |
| July 1994 | Sharon Harper | Grantham, Lincolnshire | 21-year-old Harper was beaten and strangled in the early hours of Saturday 2 July 1994 after leaving the Market Cross, the Grantham pub where she worked behind the bar, to walk to the home of her babysitter. A Hove couple arrested over her murder in 1999 were released without charge. |
| July 1994 | Iftikhar Ahmed | Luton, Bedfordshire | Ahmed, 23, was shot twice in the abdomen whilst working at a kebab shop on John Street, Luton, in the early hours of 7 July 1994. The gunman had forced his way into the kitchen via the back door and left the scene in a blue Vauxhall Cavalier whose lights were turned off. |
| July 1994 | David Foley | Kings Cross, London | 35-year-old Foley was shot outside a pub in Kings Cross on 12 July 1994. A man was accused at trial of arranging the shooting from prison after hearing that his wife and two other women had been attacked by Foley, but the judge found the prosecution's case against him too weak to allow the jury the option of convicting him. Foley had survived being shot at 10 days before his murder. |
| July 1994 | Mary Hammond | Attacked in Acton, London, died in hospital | On 12 July 1994, in a corridor of the block of flats where her home was, 66-year-old Hammond was pulled to the floor and had £170 and her pension book stolen by a teenager who had followed her out of a lift. She suffered several broken bones and internal bleeding as a result of the mugging and died on 16 July from pneumonia brought on by her injuries. |
| July 1994 | Colin Murphy | Attacked in Eastwood, West Yorkshire, died in hospital | 53-year-old Murphy, a nightclub owner, was pushed over, hit in the face with the muzzle of a shotgun and tied up with plastic wire in the grounds of his luxury house during the early hours of 17 July 1994. He had just returned there after making £3,000 from gambling at a casino, and the two men behind the assault stole that too. Murphy died at a private hospital the next day. |
| July 1994 | Chris Little | Marple, Greater Manchester | Little was shot while driving his car along Stockport Road, Marple, on 22 July 1994. Arran Coghlan was charged with the 31-year-old racketeer's murder but cleared of it in 1996; between then and 2011 Coghlan was also cleared of two other murder charges and cocaine smuggling. |
| July 1994 | Nikita Hudson | Sheffield | Four-month-old Hudson died from head injuries on 23 July 1994, having been assaulted and suffered multiple skull fractures (as well as several rib and leg fractures) at her home in Nottingham Street, Burngreave, Sheffield, six days earlier. Although her father was charged with her murder, the Crown Prosecution Service dropped the case. |
| July 1994 | Scott van Nuil | South Tottenham, London | Van Nuil, a 21-year-old Scottish soldier, was knifed three times in the chest and robbed of a bag of cocaine smuggled into the UK from Germany. He was set upon on 29 July 1994 outside Seven Sisters tube station, and two culprits were involved. A judge stopped a man's murder trial in June 1995 when the chief prosecution witness – the defendant's estranged girlfriend, who said he confessed to her – admitted lying in court about not posing for a soft pornographic magazine. |
| August 1994 | Julie Finley | Near Rainford, Merseyside | 23-year-old Finley was found dead in a carrot field just off the Rainford bypass on 6 August 1994, strangled and with her clothing missing. She was last seen alive the previous evening, talking to a man near the Royal Liverpool Hospital. Police came to suspect that Finley may be a victim of Alun Kyte, but in 2019 it was reported that they were investigating a possible link with convicted murderer Christopher Halliwell, who lived nearby and was a taxi driver. Finley was going to see a taxi driver shortly before her death. It has also been suggested that Finley's murder could be linked with those of Linda Donaldson and Maria Requena. |
| August 1994 | Douglas Bryce | Wishaw, North Lanarkshire | 21-year-old Bryce was fatally shot in the neck and a 29-year-old man was non-fatally shot in the leg while Bryce helped him start his car in Craigneuk on 25 August 1994. Three men were acquitted of Bryce's murder and the other man's attempted murder. Two of the accused claimed that Bryce was shot by the man he was helping before the man turned the gun on himself, and these two accused were also acquitted of the attempted murder of a brother of that man, who had bullets fired into his home on 3 May 1994. Ballistic experts said that both crimes were committed with the same gun. |
| August 1994 | Kenneth Brown | Barrow upon Soar, Leicestershire | Originally from the Scottish town of Falkirk, the 55-year-old businessman suffered a single gunshot wound to the chest and a cleaner discovered his body in an outbuilding in the grounds of his mansion on 26 August 1994. If the assailant was a trespasser, they had managed to gain access to the property in spite of the tall fencing and trees at its perimeter and the remote-controlled iron gates at its entrance. Brown had been fearful for his safety prior to that day, according to some of the people living close by. |
| September 1994 | Hassan Bilgi | High Halstow, Kent | Two dog walkers found Bilgi dead near a country lane on the morning of 18 September 1994 up to 14 hours after the Turkish-born 46-year-old was shot. Detectives did not come up with a clear motive for the offence but suspected it had something to do with heroin trafficking on his part. |
| September 1994 | Atek Hussain | East Ham, London | 32-year-old Hussain drove home from his tandoori restaurant in Surrey and was stabbed outside his house in Burnels Avenue, East Ham, after getting out of his car on 18 September 1994. He rang his doorbell following the attack and told his family while dying that the assailants were Asian. Hussain's laundry bag was missing but not any of the takings he had brought with him from the restaurant. |
| September 1994 | Julie Pacey | Grantham, Lincolnshire | 38-year-old Pacey was found dead in her bathroom by her daughter on 26 September 1994 after being strangled following a sexual assault. An unknown man wearing blue overalls was seen leaving the house three days previously and has been a suspect since the early days of the investigation into the murder. A Lincolnshire Police detective revealed in 2015 that they now had a DNA profile thought to belong to the perpetrator. |
| September 1994 | Stan Nicholls | Yalding, Kent | 37-year-old Nicholls was shot in the temple on 26 September 1994 when two men, one of them armed, burst into a pub in Yalding as he was leaving the building shortly before midnight. Whether the gunman meant to shoot him or whether he did so by mistake when his real intention was to rob the pub with his accomplice (nothing was taken from there by either of them) is unknown. |
| October 1994 | Kathleen Hempsall | Lincoln | 40-year-old Hempsall, a part-time midwife, was stabbed in her home on Longdales Road, Lincoln, during a burglary on 11 October 1994. A 15-year-old boy was convicted of aiding and abetting the burglary (which he had already pleaded guilty to) but not of murder (which he had not been charged with), while a second youth was convicted of murder but later had his conviction overturned. A third youth charged with murder and burglary was acquitted of both. |
| October 1994 | Michael McCormack and John Ogden | Balham, London | Colleagues McCormack, 59, and Ogden, 34, were shot in Cavendish Road, Balham, on 21 October 1994 whilst walking back to work after a pub lunch. It seemed likely to have been a case of mistaken identity. |
| October 1994 | Michael Walkling | Penge, London | Trouble between two men and his sister and her friend outside a nightclub in Penge on the night of 28/29 October 1994 prompted 20-year-old Walkling to come to the girls' assistance and push one of the men to the ground. Both that man and his companion then punched him multiple times. The men were convicted of affray and one was additionally convicted of common assault on Walkling's sister and causing actual bodily harm to her friend, but as it could not be determined who was responsible for the fatal blow or blows Walkling suffered, neither defendant was convicted of manslaughter. |
| November 1994 | Lindsay Rimer | Hebden Bridge, West Yorkshire | Rimer, a 13-year-old pupil at Calder High School in the West Yorkshire village of Mytholmroyd, lived with her parents in Cambridge Street, Hebden Bridge. At around 10:00 p.m. on 7 November 1994, she left her home to visit the local SPAR supermarket in Crown Street to buy cornflakes, and paused briefly to speak to her mother at the Trades Club in Holme Street on the way. According to CCTV footage of her at the supermarket, Rimer paid for the cornflakes at 10:22 p.m. Just over five months later, on 12 April 1995, Rimer's body was recovered from the Rochdale Canal approximately one mile upstream from Hebden Bridge town centre. A full DNA profile of her killer was isolated in 2016. |
| November 1994 | Nayantara Ali | Winchelsea Road, Forest Gate, London | 11-year-old Ali reportedly vanished on her way to school on 4 November 1994, although no reliable witnesses saw her making the 15-minute walk that morning. Her naked body was discovered rolled up in a carpet under a pile of waste 50 yards from her house on 29 November. She had suffered blows to the head and been sexually molested. The yard where the body was discovered had previously been searched numerous times, suggesting that the killer had placed it there later. It is believed Ali was still alive until four days after her disappearance. Investigators said that the killer almost certainly had local knowledge due to their awareness of the waste yard where the body had been disposed of. Ali's house and the house of her uncles who lived nearby were searched, along with the men's car, but no evidence was found to indicate her body had been kept there. |
| November 1994 | Shona Stevens | Attacked in Irvine, North Ayrshire, died in hospital in Glasgow | 31-year-old Stevens was beaten with a weapon in a daytime attack on a path near her home on 10 November 1994, and died on 13 November. Found at the crime scene, and potentially of significance to the case, was a distinctive semi-naked toy figure that police think was once attached to a keyring. A man is due to stand trial for Stevens's murder in January 2028. |
| November 1994 | Helen Kazai | Body not found | Kazai came to be treated as a suspected murder victim by police following her disappearance in mid-November 1994. Before going missing, the 25-year-old was living in Scunthorpe in Lincolnshire with her sister's common-law husband and two people he was later convicted of killing: his daughter and his common-law wife (Kazai's sister). |
| November 1994 | Barry Bailey | Attacked in Walton, Liverpool, died at Whiston Hospital | 42-year-old Bailey, a taxi driver, died on 21 November 1994 after being doused in a flammable liquid and set alight outside his house in Chapel Avenue, Walton, during the early hours of 15 November. The windows of his taxi had been smashed the day before the attack. |
| November 1994 | Ethsham Ul-Haq Ghafoor | Nottingham | 26-year-old Ghafoor, a father-of-two and taxi driver known as Shami, was shot twice in his cab on 22 November 1994. In the months that followed, although the investigation into Ghafoor's death found him to have been a popular man, police appeals for information that would move the case forward were not very successful. Despite this, two men in their 40s were arrested on suspicion of his murder in 2014; they were subsequently released on bail pending further inquiries. |
| December 1994 | John Sheppard | Aylesbury, Buckinghamshire | The 66-year-old bookmaker was hit on the head with a hammer and sustained over 40 stab wounds as a robbery took place at his betting shop in Aylesbury on the evening of 3 December 1994. |
| December 1994 | Frederick "Eric" McDonald | Glasgow | 57-year-old McDonald was fatally assaulted yards from his home in Dennistoun, Glasgow, on 8 December 1994. A young man was standing over him as his wife approached the scene on her way back from a bingo session, but the man then disappeared and his identity remained unknown. McDonald was unconscious and had blood on his head when his wife found him. |
| December 1994 | Michael "Spike" Meenaghan | Oxford | 33-year-old Meenaghan, a lecturer and research scientist at the Sir William Dunn School of Pathology at Oxford University, was shot at his end-terrace home in Blackbird Leys, Oxford, on 10 December 1994. He was shot through the kitchen window at approximately 4:30 p.m. in what police have called an apparently motiveless attack. |
| December 1994 | Leslie Watkinson | Peckham, London | 66-year-old Watkinson, a retired Salvation Army major, died on 19 December 1994 when his skull was fractured during a mugging that took place as he returned to his home in Peckham with a pension collected at the post office. |
| December 1994 | Mohammed Younis | Slough, Berkshire | Younis was a 42-year-old taxi driver who was stabbed about 15 times in the hallway of his flat in Chalvey, Slough, on 19 December 1994. Investigators suspected him to have fallen victim to an attack by a stranger who was mentally ill or a would-be burglar. |
| December 1994 | Tracey Mertens | Found fatally injured in Eaton, Cheshire. Died at the North Staffordshire Hospital in Stoke-on-Trent the following day. | Mertens was a mother-of-two aged 31 who was abducted, doused in petrol and set alight after returning to her former home in the Nechells area of Birmingham to collect belongings to take to her current address in Rochdale, Greater Manchester. A man out walking in Eaton on 23 December 1994 heard her cries and found her with her clothes still smouldering on the steps of the village church, and she died in hospital in the early hours of Christmas Eve. |
| December 1994 | Edward Bransfield | Coventry, West Midlands | Bransfield, 25, was shot in his parked car in Arthur Street, Coventry, on 29 December 1994. He was said to have been a drug dealer and to have had a kilogram of cannabis in his possession when he was murdered, but the police did not find it. |
| December 1994 | Amina Khatun | Washington, Tyne & Wear | 24-year-old Khatun was beaten and stabbed to death in front of her three children on 30 December 1994 at her home in Manor View East, Concord, Washington. Her brother was charged with her murder, but the charge was dropped because there was not enough evidence to be confident of a conviction. At the time, he was an illegal immigrant to the UK and awaiting possible deportation to Bangladesh. Two others were charged with attempting to pervert the course of justice, but these charges were also dropped. |

== 1995 ==
| Year | Victim(s) | Location of body or bodies | Notes |
|---|---|---|---|
| January 1995 | Michael Codner | Stoke Newington, London | 23-year-old Codner sustained a fractured skull and fatal brain damage when he was punched to the ground outside a club on Cazenove Road, Stoke Newington, on 23 January 1995. One of the club's bouncers was tried for manslaughter, but the judge, finding the evidence against him to be weak and inconsistent, directed the jury to clear him. |
| January 1995 | Tarsem Singh Purewal | Southall, London | 60-year-old Purewal was shot dead on 24 January 1995 while shutting up his office in The Crescent, Southall. Besides being a potential trial witness in the 1985 bombing of an Air India jumbo jet (two Canadian Sikhs were cleared of this act in March 2005), Purewal was the owner and editor of Des Pardes, a Punjabi-language weekly newspaper distributed in the UK that had published the names of rape victims, the names of their attackers, and his views on the personal lives and business practices of people in the community. No motive for his murder has ever been determined, however. |
| January 1995 | Sarbjeet Bassi | North Woolwich, London | 32-year-old Bassi was found dead in Pier Road, North Woolwich, on 27 January 1995 after an assault in which he sustained head injuries. Although his two brothers were put on trial for his murder, the trial collapsed when, following consultations with three prosecution lawyers and a senior police officer, the Crown Prosecution Service declared an end to proceedings because there was not a realistic prospect of a conviction. |
| January 1995 | John Kilcoyne | Bristol | On 28 January 1995, homeless 44-year-old Kilcoyne had been drinking in a flat with two associates when the police were called to say he had been badly hurt there. An ambulance arrived soon afterwards, but Kilcoyne was dead from a stab wound to the neck. A 64-year-old man charged with the Irishman's murder had the charge against him dropped. |
| February 1995 | Joey Dean | Blackburn, Lancashire | A man alleged at trial to have stabbed 31-year-old Dean five times for reporting him for burglary, and whom Dean was said to have named as his attacker before dying, was acquitted. The judge had noted while summing up that it was universally accepted that if it was not that man who had killed Dean, the only other person who could have was the man a defence lawyer had accused of committing the crime after falling out with Dean over a drug deal. |
| March 1995 | Paulo Seque | Brixton, London | 19-year-old Seque was an Angolan asylum seeker who, in the early hours of 5 March 1995 outside a restaurant on Atlantic Road, Brixton, was surrounded by a crowd of people who had just come out of the establishment, had CS gas sprayed into his face and was stabbed in the thigh following a dispute with staff. The dispute was to do with him not being allowed in because he had not paid the £5 entry fee. |
| March 1995 | Christina Gray | Attacked in Upper Norwood, London, died in hospital | On 18 March 1995, 79-year-old Gray's bag was stolen by two muggers who struck in Lansdowne Place in Upper Norwood as she walked home from a nearby bingo club. A woman driving in the area stopped the car, went to Gray's assistance and was told by her that she was swung around and knocked down in the attack. Gray had a broken arm and hip when the woman found her, and that evening she died in hospital. |
| March 1995 | Nasreen Akhtar | Oxford | 29-year-old Akhtar was a mother-of-four who was strangled at her home in Cobden Crescent, Grandpont, Oxford, on 30 March 1995. Her body was found by two of her children when they returned home from school. Akhtar's husband stood trial for her murder, but the trial collapsed. In 2015, police reopened the case and one of Akhtar's sons made a new appeal for information. |
| April 1995 | Michael Olymbius | Walworth, London | 40-year-old Olymbius was shot as he was getting into his car in Meadcroft Road, Walworth, at about 10:20 p.m. on 3 April 1995. The killing was said to have followed, and may have been connected to, a crime syndicate's loss of £1.5 million worth of the drug ecstasy in a police seizure. |
| April 1995 | Janet Brown | Hall Farm, Sprigs Holly Lane, between Radnage and Chinnor, Buckinghamshire/Oxfordshire border | The body of 51-year-old Brown, a mother-of-three and research nurse for Oxford University, was found naked and handcuffed at her home on 11 April 1995. She had been bludgeoned to death with a crowbar or jemmy by an intruder, but there did not appear to have been any theft and she had not been sexually assaulted. A link has been suggested with the murder of 50-year-old Carolanne Jackson 20 miles away in 1997 (see entry for 1997). |
| April 1995 | Natalie McLean | Wythenshawe, Manchester | 18-year-old McLean was last seen with an unknown man in the Piccadilly 21 club in Manchester city centre early on Saturday 15 April 1995. Her mother found her body at her flat in Wythenshawe on 20 April; she had been stabbed. A man was arrested but released without charge. In 2014 it was reported that the same man had been jailed for a sex attack on another woman and that his DNA had been recovered from McLean's flat. |
| April 1995 | Hugh Ord | Morpeth, Northumberland | 61-year-old Ord was found dead on a footpath behind his flat on Springhill Walk, Morpeth, on 15 April 1995. He had been bludgeoned. Police, who made four arrests but did not bring any charges over the incident, thought Ord had been lured to the footpath by somebody he knew. |
| April 1995 | Sally Cannon | Port Glasgow, Inverclyde | 20-year-old Cannon died after being shot at her flat in Kelburn Terrace, Port Glasgow, on the night of 22/23 April 1995. Her partner was convicted of her murder four months later, but Scotland's appeal court overturned the conviction in April 2001. Cannon's partner was retried towards the end of 2001, at which hearing it was stated that had the defence team for his earlier trial called in their own forensic experts, they might have been able to put forth evidence to support his claim that the droplets of her blood on his clothing, rather than being spatter from bullet wounds, had been coughed up by her as he held her in his arms while she was dying. A verdict of "not proven" was announced when the retrial concluded. |
| April/May 1995 | Robert Higgins | Kirkliston, West Lothian | 35-year-old Higgins's body was discovered at the disused Craig's Quarry, Kirkliston, on 1 May 1995. He had died from a stab wound to his chest. Police believed that only someone with local knowledge would have known the secluded location. In 2007, a man stood trial for Higgins's murder, but the charge was found not proven. |
| May 1995 | David Ungi | Liverpool | 36-year-old Ungi was shot in his car whilst driving along North Hill Street, Toxteth, Liverpool, on 1 May 1995, and ran a short distance before collapsing and dying. A series of non-fatal shootings in the city followed his murder and continued into June. |
| May 1995 | Sabrina Brett | Grand Union Canal, Stoke Hammond, near Milton Keynes, Buckinghamshire | 17-year-old Brett's body was found in the Grand Union Canal on Thursday 11 May 1995. She had been a sex worker. Police believed Brett had been strangled before being dumped in the canal up to six days previously. |
| May 1995 | Billy West | Carlton in Lindrick, Nottinghamshire | 42-year-old West was stabbed with a kitchen knife in the front room of his house in Carlton in Lindrick on 13 May 1995. A man was charged, and it was claimed at his 1996 trial that he had committed the murder because he had been in a relationship with West's neighbour and resented having been displaced by him as the object of her affection. The jury convicted the man, but he was acquitted in 1998 because the jurors had been given inaccurate timings and because an inmate to whom he had supposedly confessed could no longer be considered a trustworthy witness. |
| June 1995 | Leona McGovern | Glasgow | 22-year-old McGovern was strangled and stabbed and her body left behind the Arts Centre in Washington Street, Glasgow, on 2 June 1995. A man stood trial for murder but was cleared in January 1996. |
| June 1995 | Michael Doherty | Port Glasgow, Inverclyde | Doherty went missing on 9 June 1995 and his remains were discovered in August. He had been shot in the head and his body dismembered. Police suspected drug barons to have been responsible for the death of the 36-year-old former convict jailed for armed robbery. |
| June 1995 | Daniel Harley | Glasgow | 24-year-old Harley was stabbed to death at a taxi office in Govan, Glasgow, on 11 June 1995. A man acquitted of his murder a few months later was to be convicted of murdering Marc Hayes in 1999 (the conviction over Hayes's death in 1998 was reduced to one of culpable homicide in 2000, however) and Tony Ferns in 2025 (Ferns had died in 2019). |
| June 1995 | Surjit Basra | Slough, Berkshire | 42-year-old Basra was killed in an incident next to the Grand Union Canal in Slough on 17 June 1995. Facial and internal injuries were sustained by him in the incident, and the internal injuries appeared on subsequent examination to have resulted from him being kicked. A person was charged and acquitted. |
| June 1995 | Christine McGovern | Walthamstow, London | 44-year-old McGovern's body was found at her home in Hamilton Road, Walthamstow, by a friend on 22 June 1995. She lived alone with her dog and was last seen in the street outside the flat at 6:30 p.m. the previous evening. A dog police believed may have been McGovern's was heard barking at about 11:00 p.m. that same evening. The cause of death was asphyxiation, and the flat was ransacked and a number of items taken. A link has been suggested between McGovern's murder and Anthony Hardy, the "Camden Ripper". |
| July 1995 | Anthony Adams | Brixton, London | 37-year-old Adams was murdered outside Brixton tube station on 17 July 1995 after two men were seen chasing him along a nearby shopping street. They went over to him when he tripped and fell as he reached the station and he was stabbed in the heart and lungs. Police charged a 17-year-old who was involved in a fight with Adams the day before the killing, but friends backed up the youth's alibi and he was cleared at his trial. |
| August 1995, August 1996 | Don Herbert, Paul Hemingway | Sharlston Common and Normanton, West Yorkshire | The same individual is thought to have murdered the two men. Herbert, a 64-year-old ex-miner, was fatally battered in his Sharlston Common flat during the August 1995 bank holiday with the oxygen cylinder which he used to ease symptoms of pneumoconiosis and emphysema, and Hemingway, a 49-year-old window cleaner, was beaten and stabbed to death in Normanton a year later, also in his own flat. The killer took money from each victim, too. |
| September 1995 | Sally Ann John | Body not found | Although the body of 23-year-old John has never been found, her disappearance began to be treated as murder in 2014. John was a sex worker and was last seen in Aylesbury Street, Swindon, Wiltshire, on 8 September 1995. In 2011, during enquiries into the murders of Sian O'Callaghan and Becky Godden-Edwards, it was discovered that convicted killer Christopher Halliwell was a regular client of John's. In November 2014, Wiltshire Police launched a murder investigation based on "significant new information". In 2015, three men were arrested on suspicion of John's kidnap and murder but released. In 2017, police revealed that a postcard purporting to be from John was sent shortly after her death and was believed to be fake. |
| September 1995 | Marie Garrity | Body not found | 30-year-old Garrity, a sex worker and mother-of-three, disappeared at around 12 o'clock on the night of 8–9 September 1995 from the same area of Coventry that fellow sex worker Barbara Finn disappeared from in 1991. Both have been investigated as possible victims of a "Midlands Ripper", who may have been convicted prostitute killer Alun Kyte. |
| September 1995 | Gary Whitehouse | Attacked in Blackpool, died in hospital in Preston (both in Lancashire) | An occupant of a car got out and beat 27-year-old Whitehouse with a baseball bat or snooker cue early on 26 September 1995. The subsequent police investigation was hindered by the fact that the incident was not reported to them until 36 hours later and that neither of those who were with Whitehouse when it occurred could remember the location initially. |
| October 1995 | Diane Jones, Shauna Hibberd and Sarah Jane Hibberd | Merthyr Tydfil, South Wales | Jones, 21, died along with her two daughters, Shauna (aged two) and Sarah Jane (aged 13 months), after the front door of their house was torn away and petrol poured in the building and set alight while they were asleep there in the early hours of 11 October. Three women each jailed for the arson attack or an offence connected to it appealed against their convictions, resulting in two of them having theirs overturned and the other having her prison term for perverting the course of justice reduced. One of these women was exonerated by South Wales Police in a statement read out in court on behalf of the force in 2006. |
| October 1995 | Joy Hewer | Walthamstow, London | 52-year-old Hewer, a devout Christian and retired primary school teacher, was found dead in her home on 17 October 1995 after the emergency services had been called at 11:18 p.m. to report that smoke was coming from the sixth floor flat in St David's Court, Walthamstow. She had been stabbed and sexually assaulted. The murder remains unsolved, but a £20,000 reward has been offered for information leading to a conviction. In an update on Crimewatch in 2015, police revealed that they had managed to trace everyone that had been captured on CCTV entering and exiting Hewer's block of flats that night except for one man, who as of the 2020s would be between about 60 and 70 years old. The flats had an intercom system and Hewer's door had a peephole which she regularly used, so it is very likely that she knew her killer and willingly let him in. |
| November 1995 | Andrew Forsyth | Dunfermline, Fife | Although two men were convicted of the murder of 34-year-old Forsyth, whose body was found in his flat on 9 November 1995 after he was kicked, punched and hit with pieces of wood, appeal judges overturned their convictions because of statements from witnesses saying he was alive later than 3 November 1995 (the alleged date of his death). A retired police officer subsequently received a five-year prison sentence for suppressing evidence indicating that Forsyth died on a different day. |
| November 1995 | Ian Grant | Cambridge | 24-year-old Grant, a Cherry Hinton resident who had worked as a club doorman in St Ives, was shot dead on waste ground near Fulbourn Hospital, Cherry Hinton, Cambridge, on 14 November 1995. Jurors at Norwich Crown Court cleared a man of conspiracy to murder in 2000, and another man was cleared of the same charge in 2001. |
| November 1995 | Ali Abuzeid | Notting Hill, London | 54-year-old Abuzeid was stabbed repeatedly during a struggle at Quick Pick Foods, his grocery shop in Westbourne Grove, on 26 November 1995. When found there by his daughter that morning, the Libyan man's body had a mutilated face in addition to knife wounds on the torso. No theft had taken place. Abuzeid had been involved in a failed coup against Libyan leader Colonel Gaddafi's regime after helping to establish the National Front for the Salvation of Libya, and might have been assassinated as part of Gaddafi's campaign to eliminate certain individuals in exile. |
| December 1995 | Ahmed Abdullah | Liverpool | 21-year-old Abdullah was head-butted and fell down the stairs in a Liverpool nightclub on 3 December 1995. Two local men aged 20 and 27 were charged with his murder days later, but Liverpool Crown Court acquitted them. A barrister had suggested that Ahmed might have been injured fatally when other men were attacking him in the toilets after taking him there following the first assault. |
| December 1995 | John Killick | Scunthorpe, Lincolnshire | 60-year-old Killick was a security officer for Asda who was hit on the head with an iron bar and then stabbed in the chest twice outside its Scunthorpe store as he escorted two female colleagues to their cars at night on 9 December 1995. The masked assailant appeared to be after the bag he was carrying and to think it had money inside, but all it contained was receipts and paperwork. Killick finished escorting the women when the attack was over and died a short time later in hospital. |
| December 1995 | Mustafa Zarif | Essendon, Hertfordshire | Zarif's murder was believed to have been to do with heroin trafficking involving the 32-year-old Turkish Cypriot. Thought to have been strangled to death in mid-December 1995, his remains were found on 6 April 1996 in a wood near the village of Essendon. Two men originally from Turkey were cleared of the killing but received long sentences in 1998 for smuggling drugs. |
| December 1995 | Lorna Rose | Attacked in Swavesey, Cambridgeshire, died in hospital | After 73-year-old Rose was beaten with a blunt instrument at her home in September 1995 and before she died in hospital on 17 December, she came to for a short period and named her daughter as the assailant. The daughter was charged with murder but had the case against her dropped. |
| December 1995 | Trevor Hamilton | Birmingham | 37-year-old Hamilton was killed in a street shooting in Handsworth Wood, Birmingham, on 27 December 1995. Police soon started to suspect the murder to be linked with the non-fatal Christmas Eve shooting of an acquaintance of his. |
| December 1995 | Fred Barnett | Hull, East Yorkshire | 72-year-old Barnett had a stab wound to his chest and a slit across his throat when he was found at his home in Hopewell Road, Hull, on 29 December 1995. Four men were found guilty of murder and conspiracy to rob, but their convictions were overturned in 1998. |
| December 1995 | Raymond Pitt | Manchester | 20-year-old Pitt was shot in the head at close range in a gangland killing. He was driving away from the West Indian Sports and Social Club in Moss Side, Manchester, on 30 December 1995 when it happened, and a 17-year-old passenger was wounded too but not fatally. A man was acquitted of Pitt's murder in November 1996. |

== 1996 ==
| Year | Victim(s) | Location of body or bodies | Notes |
|---|---|---|---|
| January 1996 | Michael Sutherland | Hull, East Yorkshire | 31-year-old Sutherland was stabbed through the arm and in the neck near where a New Year's Eve party was taking place in Hull. A man faced trial for murder, but the jury was instructed to find him not guilty of the crime when no further evidence was offered against him. |
| January 1996 | Deborah Wood | Leeds | The smouldering remains of 20-year-old Wood, who had been missing since leaving a Leeds pub 10 days earlier, were found near a railway station on 14 January 1996. Scientific evidence suggested that her body had been stored somewhere cold prior to being dumped and set on fire. |
| January 1996 | Alan Holmes | London | Police found 53-year-old Holmes fully clothed and tied face-down to his bed in his Camden Town flat on 4 January 1996. He had been there since Boxing Day, and died in hospital the day after being discovered. Several people had used Holmes's bank cards to steal £1,000. |
| January 1996 | Steven Burton | Oxford | 20-year-old Burton was stabbed in the kitchen of a property on Cowley Road, Oxford, on 7 January 1996. During the trial of an armed robber accused of his murder – a man who met the victim and another man in Oxford city centre and later went with them to the residence where the stabbing was to take place – the prosecution contended that it was a crime motivated by the defendant's girlfriend's allegation that Burton tried to rape her a few days previously. The defendant was acquitted when that trial drew to a close, but he was sentenced for perjury in 1999 after becoming a Jehovah's Witness and confessing to Burton's murder. Double jeopardy legislation meant he could not be re-arraigned for the offence at that time, but police and prosecutors made an unsuccessful attempt to have the case brought before a jury once more following the repeal of this legislation. |
| January 1996 | Bobby Jones | Hastings, East Sussex | 27-year-old Jones was found dead in undergrowth in Alexandra Park, Hastings, on 31 January 1996, having been beaten and stabbed in the neck. He had last been seen at around 11:20 p.m. the night before in the town's Lower Park Road. Jones was said to have sold cannabis now and then and may have been in the park for a deal. Fourteen people were arrested at the time, but nobody was charged. A £10,000 reward was put forward in 2006 by someone who wished to remain anonymous. |
| January/February 1996 | Billy Weatherall | Near Bishopton, Renfrewshire | 32-year-old Weatherall was last seen alive at around 10:00 p.m. on 31 January 1996 and found shot dead the next day in a rural lane near the M8. When killed, he and seven other men were on trial for their alleged roles in a 1994 riot at Glenochil Prison in Clackmannanshire, and he had taken the decision to give evidence against his co-accused. One of the co-accused, George Docherty, is now also the victim of an unsolved murder, having been run over and stabbed in an incident in Glasgow in August 2006. |
| February 1996 | Surinder Kaur Varyapraj | Birmingham | Varyapraj's body was discovered in her house in Handsworth, Birmingham, on 5 March 1996 after a local shopkeeper had expressed concern about not having seen her within the last month. A neighbour had heard a scream coming from there on 5 February, the day after the last reported sighting of her, and a pathologist determined that someone had used a ligature or similar weapon to strangle the 36-year-old. Police had the DNA profile of a suspect by the end of 2018, but it has still not been fully or partially matched to anyone in the National DNA Database. |
| February 1996 | Peter Swailes | West Yorkshire | 39-year-old Swailes died on 9 February 1996 from a blow to the head in a road-rage incident that occurred between the West Yorkshire villages of Nostell and Fitzwilliam. His home was in nearby Featherstone. A man in his late 30s was charged with murder in 1999 and then acquitted. |
| February 1996 | Kevin Nightingale | South Shields, Tyne and Wear | 33-year-old Nightingale, a nightclub bouncer, was shot four times on his doorstep on 17 February 1996 after being driven home from his place of work. The people he was in the car with immediately prior to the shooting were each charged twice with his murder – in 2000 and in 2001 – but none of the charges resulted in a conviction and the three of them were later given £35,000 in compensation by Northumbria Police. |
| February 1996 | Junior Carter | Birmingham | 34-year-old Carter was shot outside Feed The Nation – a takeaway on Dudley Road, Winson Green, Birmingham – on 29 February 1996. |
| March 1996 | Linda Millard | Body not found | 48-year-old Millard vanished on 1 March 1996 and her car was found at Battery Point on the coast of Portishead, a town on the Bristol Channel. Police believe there was a connection to a recent triple gangland killing, as she had left her partner because of her suspicions of his involvement in the crime and he found her two days before she went missing. |
| March 1996 | Roger Ward | Sheffield | Ward, a 31-year-old art student, was assaulted in Cumberland Street, Sheffield, in the early hours of 24 March 1996. He was kicked and stoned during the assault, which was committed outside of, and apparently by people who worked at, a restaurant he and two friends had been throwing stones at after being ejected from there for drunken behaviour, and died at the scene from a compressed skull fracture. The restaurant's DJ was charged with murder but later discharged at Sheffield Magistrates' Court. |
| March 1996 | Russell Marsom | Milton, near Cambridge | 29-year-old Marsom, a hairdresser from Heacham, Norfolk, left his home to visit a nightclub in Cambridge on 30 March 1996 and was found drowned in a ditch the next day. |
| April 1996 | Andrew Bentley | Sheffield | A man with a gun entered the Flying Pizza restaurant on Glossop Road in central Sheffield, chased the 26-year-old employee out and shot him dead in the car park behind the building in the early hours of 12 April. |
| May 1996 | Owen Graham | Liverpool | A man went into a betting shop in Granby Street, Toxteth, Liverpool, and shot 49-year-old Graham dead on 1 May 1996 – a year to the day after David Ungi was shot dead in the same area of Liverpool. |
| May 1996 | Dorothy Wood | Huddersfield, West Yorkshire | 94-year-old Wood was smothered with a pillow during a burglary at her home in Whitby Avenue, Fartown, Huddersfield, on 6 or 7 May 1996. She had previously been burgled in 1993 and 1996. A man convicted of Wood's murder was released in 2004 following proof that an earprint from a window of the house was not his after all. |
| May 1996 | John Marshall | Sydenham, London | Marshall, a 34-year-old married father-of-three, lived near the Essex town of Billericay, but when his body was discovered on 22 May 1996 – a week after he had gone missing – it was in south London. He had been shot twice. The car dealer had once been in business with one of three men killed in Rettendon, Essex, in December 1995, and this prompted investigators to probe whether there was a connection. A later police statement made it apparent, however, that no connection had been found. |
| May 1996 | Terrence Mann | Attacked in California, died in hospital in Gorleston (both in Norfolk) | 51-year-old Mann, a holidaymaker from the Hertfordshire town of Borehamwood, was stabbed in the car park of The California Tavern, California, on the Norfolk coast between Great Yarmouth and Hemsby), on 25 May 1996. A man was convicted for public order offences, but there has not been a conviction for the killing. |
| June 1996 | Melanie Hall | South Gloucestershire | Hall, a 25-year-old psychology graduate from Bradford Leigh, Wiltshire, disappeared on 9 June 1996 after a night out in Bath. Her skeletal remains were unearthed next to a slip road at junction 14 of the M5, approximately 15 miles north of Bristol, on 5 October 2009. A man was detained as a suspect in November 2013. |
| June 1996 | Janet Murgatroyd | Preston, Lancashire | 20-year-old Murgatroyd was a student at the University of Central Lancashire and worked part-time for Lancashire Constabulary. She was last seen alive in the early hours of 16 June 1996, running from a man on Penwortham Bridge in Preston, before being found dead in the River Ribble, having died from drowning and head injuries. A man was convicted of manslaughter, but this was quashed on appeal in 2004. |
| June 1996 | Jacqueline Gallagher | Bowling, West Dunbartonshire | 26-year-old Gallagher, a sex worker, was last seen in Glasgow city centre on 24 June 1996. Her body was found concealed near a bus stop in Dumbarton Road, Bowling. She had been bludgeoned. A murder charge against a man, who admitted being one of Gallagher's regular clients, was found not proven in 2004. |
| July 1996 | John Rogers | Wishaw, North Lanarkshire | 12-year-old Rogers went to a golf course near his home to search for lost golf balls on 4 July 1996 and was bludgeoned with his own golf club before being drowned. His body was found weighed down by a lorry tyre in the River Calder the next day. A 42-year-old man told police that he found a boy unconscious after slapping and chasing him but claimed it was someone other than Rogers, and he was tried for murder later in 1996. Because he had a mental age of eight and no one to advise him of his rights was there when he made his confession, however, the court ruled it inadmissible and he walked free. The man was made fun of by a group of boys (Rogers was not in this group) prior to the killing and was said to have threatened one of them in return. |
| July 1996 | Katrina Taylor | Brighton, East Sussex | On 8 May 1996, eight weeks before she was stabbed to death, heroin addict Taylor kept watch while her boyfriend and a friend burgled a house. Considerable damage was done to the house in the course of the burglary, and the woman whose property it was apparently wanted whoever was responsible to pay. She, her brother and two drug dealers from London all had murder charges filed against them following the slaying of 19-year-old Taylor in a Brighton graveyard at around 11:15 p.m. on 4 July. At their trial in 1997, the drug dealers claimed that when the four defendants and Taylor were in a house together to try to reach an agreement, the woman and her brother left the house with Taylor in tow and said after returning that Taylor was dead, while the woman and her brother claimed it was the drug dealers who did that. However, the woman's brother did admit to putting the murder weapon down a drain in Peacehaven, east of Brighton. The drug dealers were found guilty of murder at that trial but acquitted at a retrial held after their convictions were overturned. One of them admitted to false imprisonment at the retrial but was freed because of time already spent in jail. |
| 26 July 1996 | Stephen Primrose | Attacked in Ellesmere Port, Cheshire, died in hospital in Chester | 34-year-old Primrose lapsed into a coma and died about six months later after his head was hit multiple times with a heavy blunt object at his home on Chester Road, Ellesmere Port. His common-law wife found him unconscious and seriously injured there in January 1996, and nearby was his unharmed baby son. |
| July 1996 | Ian Lowery | Gloucester | 26-year-old Lowery fell from a bridge in Churchdown on the night of 27/28 July 1996. A train driver and a mate saw him on the track shortly afterwards as their vehicle headed towards him, but its brakes could not be applied in time to prevent it from hitting him. Although Lowery's wallet and ring were missing, an inquest found the plunge to have been due to misadventure; but in 2002, when his death had been deemed unlawful following an independent inquiry, a man was arrested on suspicion of murder and another on suspicion of perverting the course of justice. Neither was charged. Officers had been accused of handling Lowery's case poorly by ignoring scuff marks on the wall of the bridge and failing to treat the area as one with potential to be classed as a crime scene. |
| September 1996 | William "Worm" Toye | Perth, Scotland | 36-year-old Toye was stabbed in Perth Prison on 5 September 1996 while serving a sentence for killing a man to stop him from testifying against his brother. Two convicts were charged with Toye's murder, but a jury found the charges not proven. One of those convicts was Frank McPhee, a gangster who, in May 2000, would himself be murdered and whose murder is also unsolved. |
| September 1996 | Lawrence Dabbs | Ilkeston, Derbyshire | 74-year-old Dabbs's death on 13 September 1996 was initially treated as suicide. He was found dead from carbon monoxide poisoning in his car, but the sticky tape used to attach a hose to the exhaust pipe turned out to have been bound by someone wearing gloves. Dabbs's inquest in July 1998 recorded a verdict of unlawful killing, notwithstanding claims by witnesses that he talked of committing suicide because he was in constant pain as a result of an attack of shingles. Police had suspicions about a man in whose favour the millionaire's will was changed in August 1996, but the evidence against him was not persuasive enough for a trial. |
| September 1996 | Fevzi Demir | Maldon, Essex | 35-year-old Demir vanished on 17 September 1996 and was found dead eight months later, entombed in a block of concrete in the back yard of his kebab shop in Maldon High Street. His ex-girlfriend and her husband – a newlywed couple – were convicted of manslaughter in December 1998. The woman was said to have been besotted with Demir and upset about the break-up of their relationship, while her co-accused – who admitted preventing a lawful and decent burial, illegally concealing and disposing of a corpse, using a false cheque, stealing Demir's BMW, and selling the vehicle for £700 – was said to have been impelled to kill by honour and his dismissal from the kebab shop. The manslaughter convictions were quashed in June 2000 because a pathologist stated at the 1998 trial that the cause of Demir's death was a stab wound, and failed to mention that a skull fracture indicated that he might actually have died from a blow to the head. |
| October 1996 | Geoffrey Leeming | Haxby, near York | 63-year-old Leeming was stabbed to death on 9 October 1996 in the garage of his home in Linley Avenue, Haxby. His wife was in the house watching Coronation Street at the time, and the knife used in the attack was later recovered. Leeming's wife, son and daughter were charged with conspiracy to murder, but the charges were dismissed in 1998 by a stipendiary magistrate sitting at York Magistrates' Court. The wife died in 2005. |
| October 1996 | Zoe Simpson | Body not found | 24-year-old mother-of-two Simpson vanished from her home in New Bank Street, Longsight, Manchester, on 26 October 1996. In March 1997 police announced that they believed she had been murdered and dug up the garden at the messy house she had lived in with her boyfriend, who was arrested on suspicion of murder in August 1997. Simpson's family had disapproved of her relationship with him; she had met him at 16 and lived with him in a tent for a while. Her doctor told police that Simpson had told her that the boyfriend had been violent towards her and that she was scared of him. He had a long criminal record and police said that they suspected that he had killed her and then hidden her body in a scrap appliance such as a refrigerator or washing machine before having it destroyed at a car-shredding plant 50 miles away where a witness claimed to have seen him. He died in 2012. |
| October 1996 | Julie Smailes | Leadgate, County Durham | The 27-year-old sales manager's Leadgate house was set on fire in the early hours of 30 October 1996 after she was strangled and repeatedly stabbed there, possibly for money. Scientific evidence later confirmed that a man already suspected was present at the time of the killing, which multiple people are thought to have been involved in. The same man was responsible for the August 1998 murder of 18-year-old Rachel Tough in nearby Moorside and committed suicide within days of her death by hanging himself from a tree. Another man was charged with Smailes's murder in 2001, but in 2002, prosecution lawyers advised at a pre-trial hearing that they did not have enough evidence to continue with proceedings against him. |
| November 1996 | Damien Nettles | Body not found | The 16-year-old vanished in Cowes on the Isle of Wight on 3 November 1996. The disappearance remains under investigation as murder and in 2011 several men were arrested and released on bail. |
| November 1996 | Mohammed Akram | Carrington, Greater Manchester | Akram, a 38-year-old taxi driver and father-of-five, was discovered shot dead in the village of Carrington on 11 November 1996. Theft seemed an unlikely motive because when his taxi was found in nearby Flixton, his takings from the night of 10/11 November were still in the vehicle. A CCTV camera in Carrington recorded nothing useful due to fog. |
| November 1996 | Vera Holland | Reading, Berkshire | 47-year-old Holland, a married mother-of-three living in Reading, left her home on 14 November 1996 to go to a local Kentucky Fried Chicken takeaway but did not return, and was subsequently reported missing by her husband. Her body was found in a burning pile of rubbish close to the A327 road south of Reading early on 16 November, and the cause of her death was strangulation. An appeal for new information was made by Holland's children and Thames Valley Police on the 20th anniversary of the murder in November 2016, but it remains a crime with which no one has been charged. |
| November 1996 | Gary Chick | Clacton-On-Sea, Essex | 40-year-old Gary Chick had finished his shift as a bouncer at Fibbers nightclub above the Tom Peppers pub in Pier Avenue, at 2am on 18 November 1996. He went with his fiancée Rosalind Vaughan to the nearby Waverley Hall Hotel for a few drinks with his colleagues, which was a frequent spot for bouncers. They left at 2.40am and as they walked along the seafront to his mother's home on Kingsman Drive, three masked men ambushed them and Chick was hit multiple times with what police suspected was a hammer, baseball bat or metal cosh, and he died at the scene from severe head injuries. A 28-year-old man named Paul Rowley was tried at Middlesex Guildhall Crown Court in December 1999, with the prosecution arguing that it was a revenge attack due to Rowley being barred from Fibbers for his behaviour. Chick's fiancée testified that she heard laughing and voices and only caught a glimpse of one of them for a second, and a career criminal named Royston Hammond testified claming that he was "casing" the hotel to burgle it on the night of the murder, and that he saw Chick and Vaughan leave the hotel and Rowley and two friends followed in the same direction. The defence argued that due to poor lighting and pitch black conditions along the seafront, visual identification was virtually impossible and before the jury could reach a verdict, the judge stopped the trial and ordered them to find Rowley not guilty, concluding that the case heavily relied on flawed visual identification which was ruled to be unsafe and could not possibly secure a conviction, and the fact that Vaughan did not give police a name until two years after the murder. In 2017, a woman contacted Clacton and Frinton Gazette, claiming she had been involved in a road rage incident with a man in Shropshire, and during the argument, he claimed he had been previously stabbed "by the same people that killed Gary Chick." Dash-cam footage was handed over to West Mercia Police who handed it over to Essex Police's Major Crime Team, and they determined it was not sufficient grounds for an arrest and all leads had been exhausted. |
| November 1996 | Michael Hewerdine | Body not found | 32-year-old Hewerdine vanished on 21 November 1996 after leaving his home in the Lincolnshire village of Ruskington, and it was suspected that his disappearance was to do with his alleged connections to local criminals. A tip-off in 2016 led to police officers digging at nearby East Heckington to search for his remains, but nothing was found there. |
| December 1996 | Richard Watson | East Grinstead, Sussex | Business tycoon Watson, 54, was shot dead by an unknown shooter as he arrived home on the evening of 10 December. Charges were brought against the victim's wife and stepdaughter, but these were eventually dropped. Sussex Police later apologised to the two women and acknowledged their innocence. Another suspect has since been identified, but no charges for the murder have been brought against him. |
| December 1996 | Patrick Warren and David Spencer | Bodies not found | 11-year-old Warren and 13-year-old Spencer, two boys known as the "Milk Carton Kids", were last seen outside a petrol station in Chelmsley Wood, West Midlands, on 27 December 1996. Although their bodies have not been found since they vanished that night, the police began to treat their case as a double murder in 2006 after it emerged that child rapist and murderer Brian Field was living in nearby Solihull at the time of their disappearance and had access to a van. Field abducted two boys in his car in 1986, but they escaped, and he remains the only person to have been convicted of such a crime in Britain. Searches of land in 2006 failed to locate the missing boys. Field remains the prime suspect, but the police never had sufficient evidence to charge him. The case featured on criminologist David Wilson's Channel 4 documentary series In the Footsteps of Killers in 2021. |

== 1997 ==
| Year | Victim(s) | Location of body or bodies | Notes |
|---|---|---|---|
| 5 January 1997 | Guydance Dacres | Clapton, London | 16-year-old Dacres was shot dead in the Chimes nightclub on Lower Clapton Road, Clapton. He did not have any gangland connections and appeared to have had the gun fired at him at random. Two men were acquitted of murder in 2000. |
| 6 January 1997 | Marion Ross | Kilmarnock, East Ayrshire | 51-year-old Ross was stabbed in the eye and throat with scissors at her bungalow in Kilmarnock. A man's murder conviction was set aside after it turned out that a fingerprint discovered on a biscuit tin found at his home – a tin he was alleged to have stolen from the bungalow because it contained money – was misidentified as the victim's by a forensic science bureau. The same bureau also misidentified a fingerprint as belonging to a police officer named Shirley McKie, which led to her being accused of falsely claiming that she did not leave it at the scene. McKie was cleared of perjury. |
| 24 January 1997 | Marsha Wray | Body not found | Wray, a 38-year-old nurse from Harrogate in North Yorkshire, went missing after taking her son and daughter to a local primary school. Her car was later seen at nearby Nidd Gorge and then in Leeds, where it was recovered, but police do not know how it came to be at either of those locations. |
| 27 January 1997 | Isabelle Gray | Leeds | 82-year-old Gray was found dead in the kitchen of her home in Austhorpe Road, Crossgates, Leeds, on 28 January 1997. It is believed she was attacked by two men who called at the house at teatime the previous day. Cash and Gray's handbag were stolen. |
| 8 February 1997 | John Kennedy | Attacked in Shadwell, London, died in hospital | 31-year-old Kennedy was stabbed in a pub in the East End following a heated conversation with someone. A £30,000 reward for information was offered by the Metropolitan Police in 2022. |
| 9/10 February 1997 | Kevin Muhyiddin | Bath, Somerset | 45-year-old Muhyiddin's body was found in his flat following a report of a fire there. He had been beaten, strangled and stabbed. A man cleared of Muhyiddin's murder in 1998 was convicted in 2000 of the murder of 18-year-old Rebecca Storrs, whose body had been found in the River Ogmore at Bridgend, south Wales, in March 1999. |
| 15 February 1997 | Billie-Jo Jenkins | Hastings, East Sussex | 13-year-old Jenkins was beaten to death with a metal tent peg on the patio of her family home in Hastings. Her foster father Sion Jenkins, who by chance had the same surname, was convicted of her murder in 1998. This conviction was quashed in 2004 and a retrial was ordered. After two retrials at which neither jury was able to reach a verdict, Jenkins was acquitted in 2006. He has been denied compensation as no evidence disproves his guilt. |
| 25 March 1997 | Daniel Roff | London | 36-year-old Roff, a man believed to have had a role in the April 1990 murder in Spain of Great Train Robber Charlie Wilson, was shot on the drive of his Bromley home and died at the Royal London Hospital. He had used a wheelchair because he had been paralysed by a shooting at a nightclub in 1995 or 1996. |
| April 1997 | Paul McGrath | Denton, Greater Manchester | 34-year-old McGrath was stabbed 18 times in an early hours attack at his home on 7 April 1997, and his body was found at the bottom of the stairs by a workman who had noticed while passing that the door was ajar. Police think the killing was over a dispute involving an acquaintance of the victim. Two men went on trial in March 1998 and were cleared. |
| April 1997 | Carolanne Jackson | Wooburn Green, Buckinghamshire | 50-year-old Jackson ran an antique jewellery business from her home in Wooburn Green. She had severe head injuries when she was found tied up and deceased in her kitchen on 13 April 1997, but asphyxiation was what had caused her death. Police believed the culprit had been trying to get information from Jackson to access her safe. The safe was still locked, but her Rolex watch and some jewellery were missing. Jackson had previously told police that a man was stalking her. A link has been suggested with the murder of Janet Brown 20 miles away in 1995 (see entry for 1995). |
| April 1997 | Linda Chandler | Birmingham | Widowed Chandler, 46, was stabbed on her doorstep in Fairbourne Avenue, Birmingham, on 18 April 1997. She managed to reach a neighbour's home but collapsed and was dead on arrival at City Hospital. No motive has ever been established. A local man was arrested but released without charge. |
| May 1997 | Emily Salvini | Caversham, Reading, Berkshire | Seven-year-old Salvini was asleep in her home on Hemdean Road, Caversham, Reading, when petrol was poured through the letterbox and then lit early on Saturday 3 May 1997. Her mother and brother, who was three years old at the time, escaped the blaze. Both were treated for severe burns at Stoke Mandeville Hospital in Aylesbury and recovered from their injuries, but Salvini died of smoke inhalation. It was found that phone lines to the house were cut prior to the arson attack to prevent calls to the emergency services. On 3 May 2017, the 20th anniversary of Salvini's death, her mother and brother made a new appeal for information, but the case remains unsolved. |
| May 1997 | Joe McCafferty | Huddersfield, West Yorkshire | Seven-year-old McCafferty was sleeping in his aunt's house in Huddersfield when petrol was poured through the letterbox and set alight. Four other members of his family were inside the house and escaped, but McCafferty died in hospital. His death came on the same day that another child, seven-year-old Emily Salvini, was killed in an arson attack in Reading, and her murder is also unsolved. |
| May 1997 | Sean Harvey | Luton, Bedfordshire | Harvey, 26, died outside a kebab shop on 11 May from a ruptured artery caused by a single blow to the neck during a commotion in which he and a friend were hit by two people. A teenage boy on trial for Harvey's murder admitted throwing a punch at him but said it could not have been the fatal injury because his punch was delivered not to Harvey's neck but to his eye. |
| May 1997 | Kingsley Iyasara | Attacked in Finsbury Park, London, died in hospital | On 17 May 1997, allegedly to avenge a non-fatal stabbing they thought he was responsible for, a gang of youths beat 16-year-old Iyasara with sticks and baseball bats on the landing of some flats before one of them shot him in the leg. The stabbing victim was said to have been part of the gang. Because detectives were not able to determine the shooter's identity or that anyone apart from him knew that he was carrying a gun and planning to use it, no one was charged with Iyasara's murder, but six youths were convicted of conspiracy to commit grievous bodily harm against him. |
| June 1997 | George Pugh | Kilburn, London | 56-year-old Pugh was stabbed at his flat on Kilburn Park Road, Kilburn. A friend found his body on 12 June 1997 (the body had head injuries as well as stab wounds), and two weeks later the police appealed for people to help them get a better idea of Pugh's movements from the morning of 11 June to the afternoon of 12 June. |
| June 1997 | Winnie Deighton | Attacked in Bridlington, East Yorkshire, died in hospital in Scarborough, North Yorkshire | 59-year-old grandmother Deighton was found unconscious on a verge near her home in Bridlington on 10 June 1997, having been raped and beaten. She died in hospital 11 days later. A man was tried for murder in 1999, but the case against him was dismissed. Deighton's case was re-examined in 2013, with police revealing they had DNA from the scene. |
| June 1997 | Ann Myring | Body not found | 45-year-old Myring went missing after leaving work and heading home in her Vauxhall Carlton on 25 June 1997. The car was left on the driveway of her house in Chevening Close, Stoke Gifford, near Bristol. Myring's husband, who was seeing another woman at the time of the disappearance, was charged with murder in October 1997 and cleared in December 1999. |
| July 1997 | Jodine Brown | Sant Road, West Heath, Birmingham | 17-year-old Brown's mother found her battered and decomposing body under a duvet in her bedroom on 18 July 1997. She had been drugged, struck over the head and strangled. |
| July 1997 | Mohammed Nazir | Slough, Berkshire | 61-year-old Nazir was shot in his home on 28 July 1997 after throwing himself in front of his 19-year-old son to protect him from two balaclava-clad gunmen who had forced their way in. Nazir and his son were both shot in the legs and then Nazir was shot in the abdomen as he chased the fleeing culprits. |
| July 1997 | George Dean | Kilburn, London | 74-year-old Dean was killed at a laundrette near his Kilburn home on the afternoon of 31 July 1997. He and a younger man had been having what appeared to be a normal conversation when the younger man suddenly knifed him before fleeing. |
| August 1997 | Patricia Grainger | Sheffield | 25-year-old Grainger, a vulnerable woman with learning difficulties, was found murdered close to her home in Buchanan Road, Parson Cross, on 10 August 1997. Her body had been left beneath a bed base in a brook and she had suffered multiple stab wounds. In May 2020, Grainger's family and Crimestoppers offered a £10,000 reward for information leading to a conviction. |
| August 1997 | Warren Wilson | Bedford | Wilson, a 32-year-old police informant, was shot in the head four times as he sat in his car on 17 August 1997. A street cleaner found the murder weapon – a Smith & Wesson gun that had once belonged to a Scottish police force – wrapped up in a towel in a flowerbed. Bedfordshire Police charged a man with murder after being told by his brother that he had admitted to the killing. It was alleged during his trial that two brothers had paid him to commit the crime because they wanted Wilson out of the way to make it easier for them to have control over the supply of drugs in the Bedford area, but he was cleared by the jury. |
| August 1997 | John Nolan | Notting Hill, London | Nolan was left on the drive of a school on Kensington Park Road after being kicked and stamped to death during the annual Notting Hill Carnival. The discovery of the 50-year-old's body was made on the morning of 26 August. |
| September 1997 | Christopher McGrory | Milngavie, East Dunbartonshire | 25-year-old McGrory was strangled in his van near Dougalston Golf Course on 23 September 1997. Murder charges against Colin McKay and gangster Frank McPhee, who were suspected of killing him in a dispute over drugs, were found not proven the following March. McKay and McPhee had both attended McGrory's wedding earlier in September 1997, the former as the best man. |
| October 1997 | David Seymour | Reading, Berkshire | 30-year-old Seymour was hit over the head with a bottle and stabbed in the chest outside a wine bar in The Oracle, a large indoor shopping and leisure mall in central Reading, during the early hours of Sunday 26 October 1997. |
| October/November 1997 | Sharon Lynch | Liverpool | 22-year-old Lynch was strangled and beaten and her body left in a derelict warehouse in Liverpool city centre. The body was found in the warehouse on 27 November 1997, but may have lain undiscovered for as long as a month. John Flanagan was found guilty of Lynch's murder the following year, but his conviction was quashed in September 2005. |
| November 1997 | Michael Pritchard | Kirk Langley, Derbyshire | 54-year-old Pritchard was deliberately run over in Kirk Langley when he tried to stop his delivery van from being stolen on 12 November 1997. |
| November 1997 | Kate Bushell | Exwick, Exeter, Devon | Bushell, 14, was murdered on 15 November 1997 as she walked a neighbour's dog a short distance from her home in Exwick, on the outskirts of Exeter. Bushell had left the residence in Burrator Drive at 4:30 p.m. When she failed to return, her parents called the police. A search located Bushell's body in a field next to Exwick Lane at 7:35 p.m. that evening. Her killer had slashed her throat. |
| November 1997 | George Bromley | Liverpool | Bromley, a doorman and gangland enforcer aged 33, was shot dead in the kitchen of a friend's house in Liverpool on 18 November 1997. The friend, who claimed that he answered the door to the assailant and then ran into the garden when told to get back, was accused and found not guilty of luring the victim to the Valescourt Road property in order for a hitman to target him. |
| November 1997 | Shane Thompson | Nottingham | 19-year-old Thompson was chased and beaten to death outside a pub in Radford, Nottingham, on 30 November 1997. The assailants were part of a rival gang, and at least some of them had weapons. Six men were cleared of Thompson's murder. |
| December 1997 | John Haselden | Whiston, Merseyside | Haselden, a 23-year-old car dealer, was found dying from a gunshot wound in his Ford Escort Cabriolet on 1 December 1997. The vehicle was parked in the car park of Whiston Hospital's maternity unit, apparently having been driven there by someone else. |
| December 1997 | Jackie Chau Kwok Tam | Leeds | Jackie Chau Kwok Tam, 41, was shot in the kitchen of a Chinese restaurant while three men were attempting to rob the premises on 9 December 1997, and died on 12 December at Leeds General Infirmary. The restaurant was in the city's district of Headingley. |
| December 1997 | Deborah Steel | Body not found | Although 37-year-old Steel disappeared in 1997, it was not until 2014 that the police changed the status of her case from that of missing person to presumed murder victim. By the end of that year, three men had been arrested on suspicion of her murder, but none of them was charged. In early 2015, the patio area of the pub Steel had run in Ely (Cambridgeshire) and the garden of her former home in the city were both dug up, but her body was not found. The police think she was killed soon after catching a taxi from the pub to her house in the early hours of 28 December, and would like to have a "proper conversation" with the driver of that taxi. |

== 1998 ==
| Year | Victim(s) | Location of body or bodies | Notes |
|---|---|---|---|
| January 1998 | Kazia Thomas | Hackney, London | 19-year-old Thomas, a student at Greenwich College, was found battered to death on an industrial site on 1 January 1998. It was thought that he might have been followed out of the nearby Powerhouse nightclub after becoming involved in a row there during a New Year's Eve party and subsequently being evicted. |
| January 1998 | Hannah Deterville | Perivale, London | The body of Deterville, a 15-year-old schoolgirl missing for three weeks, was discovered mutilated at Horsenden Woods on 24 January 1998. She had been stabbed 20 times in the face and the neck. No motive could be found. |
| January 1998 | Jimmy Harmon | Body not found | Harmon, a 30-year-old mechanic and doorman with connections to the east London criminal world, disappeared after leaving his girlfriend's home in Romford on 24 January 1998 following a call to his mobile phone. He told her before leaving that he was going to see a friend in Rainham, and his car was later found abandoned in Goodmayes. |
| February 1998 | Charlie Jones | Attacked in Northwich, Cheshire, died about 16 days later | 42-year-old Jones died on 10 February from a blood clot triggered by a nighttime street attack he had suffered in his home town just over two weeks earlier. |
| February 1998 | John Bennett | Glasgow | Bennett, 26, was beaten and stabbed multiple times on Royston Road, Glasgow, on 28 February 1998. The attack occurred in broad daylight, in front of shoppers. Three men, including Glasgow gangster Ian McAteer, stood trial for murder later in the year. No motive was put forward at the hearing, but senior police officers had previously suggested that drug barons might have ordered the slaying because Bennett owed them money. All three men were acquitted. |
| March 1998 | Elsie Freeman | Impington, Cambridgeshire | 76-year-old Freeman's nephew found her trussed-up body on her bed at her home in Mill Road, Impington, near Cambridge, at around noon on 7 March 1998. She had been beaten and died from head injuries up to three days earlier, apparently in a burglary that had gone wrong. |
| April 1998 | Paul Cannon | Addlestone, Surrey | 43-year-old Cannon died from a ruptured liver after being jumped on during a beating in the toilets of the Magpie pub in Addlestone on Friday 17 April 1998. A man was acquitted of murder and manslaughter in August 1999. While in the witness box, he alleged that another man who was drinking at that pub on the night of the offence was the real culprit and named him. |
| April 1998 | Donna Keogh | Body not found | The body of 17-year-old Keogh has never been found, but her disappearance from Middlesbrough is being investigated as a murder. She lived there with cousins and was last seen on 28 April 1998. In 2015, Cleveland Police apologised to Keogh's family for how they had handled the investigation. In 2018, a specialist police team was set up to revisit the murder, along with those of fellow Middlesbrough women Vicky Glass and Rachel Wilson. In the summer of that year, police excavated a former allotment site near Troon Close in the town. |
| April 1998 | Janet Johnson | Manchester | 27-year-old Johnson's body was found next to a tram line in Collyhurst, Manchester, on 28 April 1998. She had been bludgeoned and strangled. A 20-year-old man was acquitted of the pregnant prostitute's murder in December. |
| May 1998 | Robin Wood | Northolt, London | Car dealer Wood, 47, was shot dead at his front door on Saturday 2 May 1998. He was at home with his partner and 10-year-old son on the Racecourse Estate in Northolt, West London when there was a knock on the door at around 10:40 p.m. His partner answered it to find a man calling himself Terry and asking to speak to Wood. As the victim approached the door, he was shot in the neck with a sawn-off shotgun. He bled to death at the scene. The perpetrator, described as wearing an unzipped dark-coloured anorak, having sharp facial features and being white, aged 25–35, 5 feet 7 inches (1.70 m) in height and of slim build, was seen to run into Kempton Avenue. On the 15th anniversary of the murder, detectives offered a £20,000 reward for information leading to the prosecution of the person responsible. |
| May 1998 | Carmel Fenech | Body not found | 16-year-old Fenech disappeared on 21 May 1998 and was never seen again. Her case is now being treated as murder. Fenech had drifted into drug use whilst living in London; at the time of her disappearance her home was in the Sussex town of Crawley but she had been paying regular visits to the Brixton and Stockwell areas of the capital. Fenech was last seen talking to a man at Camberwell Green Magistrates' Court, south London. The man was never traced. |
| May 1998 | Annie Davies | Erskine, Renfrewshire | When 84-year-old Davies was discovered dead at her home on 30 May 1998, police assumed she had died from a fall down the stairs. However, her purse, bag, keys and £2,000 were found to be missing. In 2005, seven years after Davies's death, the Criminal Injuries Compensation Appeals Panel ruled that her death was "attributable to a crime of violence" and police reopened the investigation. |
| June 1998 | Daniel McFadden | Bolton, Lancashire | 66-year-old McFadden was beaten at his home in Mere Gardens, Bolton, before the flat was set on fire during the early hours of 18 June 1998. Police were unable to establish a motive for his murder. |
| June/July 1998 | Julie Jones | Manchester | 32-year-old Jones was reported missing by her housemate on 27 June 1998 and found dead under bushes on the site of the old Smithfield Market in Manchester city centre on 3 July. The sex worker had suffered catastrophic injuries consistent with falling from a height or being hit by a car, and her clothing was missing. Detectives believed someone could have murdered Jones elsewhere before dumping her body. |
| July 1998 | Stephen Sweeney | Gateshead, Tyne and Wear | 45-year-old Sweeney's partner and seven-year-old daughter discovered him shot dead at his furniture upholstery factory on an industrial estate in Felling on 8 July 1998. He was later found to have belonged to a gang responsible for trafficking drugs between various countries and to have used his business to launder money made from the trafficking. |
| July 1998 | Julia Webb | Sandiway, near Northwich, Cheshire | 52-year-old Webb, a housewife from Sandiway, was battered with a blunt instrument while walking her dog near her home on 22 July 1998. A 43-year-old man was released without charge in March 2004 after being detained in relation to the offence. |
| July 1998 | Alfred Sandford | St Helens, Merseyside | 72-year-old Sandford died from a cardiac arrest during a violent robbery at his home – Grove House Farm, Elton Head Road, Sutton Heath, St Helens – on 24 July 1998. The armed gang left with a small amount of cash, and the two vehicles used in the robbery were later found burnt out at other locations in the town. Sandford's wife died six months later from what her family described as a broken heart. |
| July 1998 | Jean and Anthony Trigg | Clacton, Essex | The fire that killed 27-year-old Trigg and her five-year-old son had been started next to the front door of a house in Clacton in the early hours of 27 July. The two victims, along with Trigg's baby son Callum, had been staying there with members of another family while Trigg looked for a home of their own in the area, which she and her children had recently moved to from Bolton. Callum survived the blaze, as did the five other people at the residence. A suspect was apprehended in 1998 and for a second time in 2004. |
| August 1998 | Peter Hennessy | Finsbury, London | 22-year-old Hennessy was stabbed in the abdomen during a fight outside the Duke of Wellington pub in Lever Street, Finsbury, on 30 August 1998 at approximately 11:00 p.m. He and his brother had gone back there after being asked to leave when an argument had broken out. |
| September 1998 | Charles Nelson | Liverpool | 65-year-old Nelson was stabbed nine times in an alley in Kensington, Liverpool, just after midnight on 2 September 1998. Two women intervened and the attacker ran off. A friend of Nelson was placed on trial in 1999. According to the prosecution, the defendant had killed Nelson because Nelson had taken the defendant's wallet in order to pay for the services of a sex worker. Nelson was thought to have been heard pleading with the defendant that night and a bloody footprint matching one of the defendant's boots was found at the scene, but the jury did not find him guilty. |
| September 1998 | Lee Harris | Epsom, Surrey | 30-year-old Harris suffered a knife attack before being shot in the legs and abdomen after three men barged in through the back door of his house in Rutland Close, Epsom, late at night on 4 September 1998. His girlfriend ran out screaming and begged for an ambulance to be called. The masked killers were believed to have been hired hitmen, and may have left the scene in a white Vauxhall Astra. Harris was possibly targeted over drugs. |
| September 1998 | Tariq Sattar | Huddersfield, West Yorkshire | Pub landlord Sattar, 35, was killed in the cellar of his establishment on 6 September 1998 after having his wrists and ankles tied. The establishment was the Black Bull Hotel, situated on Halifax Old Road, Birkby, Huddersfield. One man was convicted of attempted robbery but acquitted of murder, while another was convicted of burglary. The one convicted of burglary claimed that he heard a bang as he ransacked the safe upstairs, went downstairs to investigate, and saw his co-defendant in the cellar with a smoking gun in his hand, standing near the shot victim. |
| September 1998 | Rosemary Talbot | Surrey | 53-year-old Talbot was strangled on 9 September 1998 and her body was discovered the following morning in a pond next to Bransland Wood. Her husband was tried but found not guilty. |
| October 1998 | Michael Baxendale | Sheffield | 48-year-old Baxendale was stabbed to death and two doormen suffered non-fatal knife wounds early on Sunday, 11 October during a brawl outside Niche, a Sheffield city centre nightclub managed by him and owned by his brother. A group of people thought to be from Manchester were evicted from the establishment in the hours preceding the incident, but it is unknown whether any of them were involved in it. |
| October 1998 | Lyn Bryant | Ruan High Lanes, Cornwall | 40-year-old Bryant was murdered as she was walking her dog along a country lane at Ruan High Lanes, a hamlet on the Roseland Peninsula, on 20 October 1998. Her body was found that day at 2:30 p.m. She had been stabbed several times. The offence is said to be connected to schoolgirl Kate Bushell's murder the previous year. |
| November 1998 | Denise Motley | Hitchin, Hertfordshire | 43-year-old Motley was battered to death with a metal parking post on the stairs leading to the basement of a furniture store on 9 November 1998. She ran the store with her husband and it was situated in a part of Hitchin where shop raids had become common. Police charged Motley's husband with murder after finding proof that he had been unfaithful to her, but the verdict at his trial was not guilty. |
| November 1998 | Saul "Solly" Nahome | Finchley, London | 48-year-old Nahome was shot several times in the back at his home on Arden Road, Finchley. He collapsed and was shot again, this time in the head. The murder took place on 27 November and is believed to be linked to the disappearance earlier in 1998 of business associate Gilbert Wynter. |
| December 1998 | Csaba Miczi | Deptford, London | Human remains found at Deptford on 14 December 1998 were identified as 34-year-old Miczi's in May 2002. He had been strangled and killed by a blow to the head, in all likelihood less than 24 hours before the severed body parts were discovered. Miczi had been staying in London after leaving Hungary to avoid serving a five-year sentence for fraud there. |
| December 1998 | Grant "Granny" Byrom | Colchester, Essex | 30-year-old Byrom received a fatal stab wound to the heart on 26 December 1998 during a brawl in Forest Road, Colchester. A suspect left the UK but returned in 2019 and was charged with murder after entering a police station to try to clear his name. He claimed at a trial in the summer of 2020 that he moved abroad because he did not want to go to jail for a crime he did not commit, and the jury acquitted him by a 10–2 majority. |
| December 1998 | Alan Morris | Chester | 44-year-old Morris was stabbed outside his home in Walker Street, Hoole, Chester, on 31 December 1998. He was a former player for Chester City football club. Morris's partner stood trial for his death but was acquitted in December 1999. The pair had been seen arguing earlier on the evening of the stabbing. |

== 1999 ==
| Year | Victim(s) | Location of body or bodies | Notes |
|---|---|---|---|
| January 1999 | Mary Daulby | Liverpool | 76-year-old Daulby died on 8 January 1999 as a result of complications from surgery to repair a hip that fractured when she fell over while being mugged in a subway in Liverpool on 19 October 1998. Her handbag was taken during the incident. |
| January 1999 | Gideon Tsagane | Kentish Town, London | Tsagane, a 30-year-old stagehand, was shot three times in the back and once in the head at a garage in Islip Street, Kentish Town, on 29 January 1999. He was due to give evidence days later against a man he claimed he saw fatally shoot Patrick Delaney in Queen's Crescent (also in Kentish Town) in July 1998. |
| January 1999 | Jay Abatan | Brighton, Sussex | 42-year-old Abatan, an accountant from Eastbourne, died at the Royal Sussex County Hospital five days after being punched to the ground in an attack outside Brighton's Ocean Rooms nightclub that appeared to have been racially motivated. Lack of evidence led to the case against two men accused of involvement in the attack being discontinued. A later trial for assault, at which the jurors were not told that Abatan had died, resulted in the acquittals of the same two men, one of whom went on to kill himself in 2003. Essex Police, called in to reinvestigate the case, found that many serious errors had been made during the original investigation, which led to some of the Sussex Police officers involved being disciplined. |
| February 1999 | Steven Brown | Tranent, East Lothian | The beaten and stabbed body of 35-year-old Brown was discovered in Tranent, a town a few miles from the eastern outskirts of Edinburgh, on 21 February 1999. It was thought that his injuries were inflicted the night before during a confrontation involving a large group of people in Kerr Road, close to where he was found dead. |
| March 1999 | Paul Booth | Southampton | The 31-year-old builder and diving enthusiast went to Southampton General Hospital on 5 February 1999 after being beaten by three men at a petrol station in Totton, but left without receiving treatment because of the length of time he would have had to wait for it. Though there was a crack in his skull caused by the attack and he was having frequent headaches and dizzy spells, Booth returned to work the following week but was found unconscious at his Southampton home on 16 February. He died of a brain haemorrhage in hospital on 3 March. Police thought Booth might have known his assailants or been a victim of road rage. |
| March 1999 | Mervyn Sills | Brixton, London | 36-year-old Sills was shot in Rushcroft Road, Brixton, on 6 March 1999. The shooting took place in a busy street and was thought to have been part of a drug turf war in the capital. A warrant was issued in September 1999 for the arrest of a man who had been apprehended over the Jamaican's death but failed to answer bail. |
| March 1999 | Kevin Palmer | Body not found | A businessman living in Spain, 37-year-old Palmer vanished on 12 March 1999 after getting out of a taxi during a visit to the UK, having argued with fellow passengers. In 2014, following a tip-off, police officers searched the grounds of an abandoned pub in Fareham, Hampshire in a bid to find his body. The case is being treated as murder. |
| March 1999 | Bruce Gapper | Body not found | 40-year-old Gapper disappeared on 14 March 1999 after leaving his home on Groves Hall Road, Dewsbury, West Yorkshire, in an apparent hurry. In 2015, police announced that his disappearance was being treated as murder. Gapper had left a half-eaten sandwich and a nearly full drink in his house, and the next day his burnt-out car was found at the junction of Castle Hill Side and Lumb Lane in Huddersfield. His bank card was then used several times over the next three days in Heckmondwike, Scarisbrick and Morley. |
| March 1999 | Maria Wodianitzky | Attacked in Knightsbridge, London, died in hospital | 49-year-old Wodianitzky was dragged off a bus by someone attempting to steal the Swedish tourist's handbag on 27 March 1999. Her head hit the kerb as she fell from the moving vehicle, and a member of the public chased after the culprit as he fled empty-handed. |
| April 1999 | Karl Morris | Attacked in Sudbury, died in hospital in Bury St Edmunds (both in Suffolk) | 23-year-old Morris was fatally attacked on 2 April 1999 (Good Friday) after trying to break up a fight that had started in a pub before spilling outside. A man police wanted to speak to about the killing is no longer being sought. |
| April 1999 | Elizabeth Chau | Body not found | Chau, a 19-year-old Vietnamese student, disappeared from Ealing Broadway on 16 April 1999. Police believe her to have been killed by serial sex offender and suspected serial killer Andrzej Kunowski, who murdered a 12-year-old girl nearby in 1997 and is known to have been working at a dry-cleaning shop on the Uxbridge Road on the day Chau was last seen walking past Ealing police station. The year after Chau went missing another woman, 27-year-old Lola Shenkoya, disappeared from the same area, and Kunowski is also the prime suspect in her case. |
| April 1999 | Jill Dando | Fulham, London | On the morning of 26 April 1999, 37-year-old Dando left the home of her fiancé, Dr. Alan Farthing, and returned to her house in Gowan Avenue, Fulham, west London. As she reached her front door at about 11:30 a.m., she was shot once in the head. Dando was found a short time later by a friend, local resident Helen Doble, and taken to the nearby Charing Cross Hospital, where she was declared dead on arrival at 1:03 p.m. After a huge amount of press coverage and a 13-month investigation, police arrested Barry George, a convicted sex offender, for Dando's murder. Sentenced to life imprisonment on 2 July 2001, George appealed against his conviction in November 2007 and was acquitted on 1 August 2008 following an eight-week hearing. |
| May 1999 | Gary Mignott | Bristol | 27-year-old Mignott being stabbed to death in Grosvenor Road, St Pauls, Bristol, on 1 May 1999 allegedly followed him punching a Jamaican gangster and refusing to pay for crack cocaine. A man was cleared of murder and manslaughter in February 2000 after his wife claimed he was at home with her and not in Grosvenor Road when Mignott was stabbed there. |
| May 1999 | Katherine O'Brien | Runcorn, Cheshire | 26-year-old O'Brien was murdered at her home at The Croft, Halton, Runcorn, on 3 May 1999. She died from head injuries. O'Brien's husband stood trial for her murder but was acquitted in May 2000. |
| May 1999 | Richard Smith | South Tottenham, London | 35-year-old Smith, a Tottenham resident, was stabbed to death at a flat in Albert Road, South Tottenham, on 5 May 1999. |
| May 1999 | Mary Lazenby | Bethnal Green, London | 80-year-old Lazenby was kicked and stamped to death at her flat in Rochester Court, Wilmott Street, Bethnal Green, on 22 May 1999. Her killer was possibly a man claiming to be from the water company. Lazenby was disabled due to losing a foot in a childhood accident. Once a successful restaurateur known as the "Curry Queen of South Shields", she eventually lost her business and settled in Bethnal Green with her son and grandchildren. |
| June 1999 | Jack Hughes | Liverpool | 18-year-old Hughes was stabbed in the leg in the early hours of 5 June 1999 in Adrian's Way, Kirkby. He died at Liverpool's Fazakerley Hospital shortly afterwards. |
| June 1999 | Barrington Page | Edmonton, London | 44-year-old page, a minicab driver and former DJ, disappeared on 8 June 1999 and was found dead in the River Lea at Edmonton nine days later with his head and hands cut off. When he was a DJ, he worked around Clapton and Stoke Newington on the same sound system as MC Ian Dowe, who became a world champion bodybuilder and later said: "If I hadn't got out of it, I'd be dead or in jail too." |
| June 1999 | Michael Marples | Sheffield | Marples, 57, suffered injuries to his brain and skull during an assault in the car park of the Sheffield Trades & Labour Club on the night of 18/19 June 1999. A man was convicted of manslaughter in 2002 despite claiming to have discovered and tried to help the dying victim, but the conviction was overturned in 2006. The reason it was overturned, however, has been kept secret on the grounds that disclosing it would cause "serious damage to the public interest". |
| June 1999 | Maureen Hale | Body not found | Hale lived in Thames Ditton in Surrey and went missing aged 42. Her husband was tried for her murder in 2009. The prosecution argued that he strangled her to death in their house on 22 June 1999 because she wanted a divorce and he did not want to lose the house or his children, but his legal team said there was no scientific evidence against him, he had no defensive wounds and there were other people who potentially could be suspects. The jury found him not guilty. |
| July 1999 | Nathan Cawley | Windsor, Berkshire | 21-year-old Cawley, from Croydon in south London, was shot in a nightclub in Windsor town centre on 4 July 1999. The incident was thought to have been drug-related. |
| July 1999 | William "Billy" Cox | Derby | 63-year-old Cox often slept rough and normally carried a bag of coins while doing so, but no such bag was with him when he was found with head injuries in The Avenue, Derby, at around 12:30 a.m. on 13 July 1999. The injuries were due to him being kicked and beaten, and he died at the city's Derbyshire Royal Infirmary. |
| July 1999 | Patrick and Margaret Spencer | Leeds | Patrick Spencer, 85, and his wife Margaret, 77, both died after their home in Sandiford Terrace, Manston, Leeds, was deliberately set alight on 21 July 1999. Though they were rescued, Margaret died a short while later from smoke inhalation and Patrick died from the effects of the fire two months later. |
| July 1999 | Hok Wan Leung | Colchester, Essex | On 25 July 1999, the 34-year-old chef from Watford in Hertfordshire was attacked at Middleborough roundabout in Colchester by a gang armed with machetes, allegedly to punish him for breaking away from a Triad group and starting up his own business. All seven of the people tried over his murder were acquitted. |
| July 1999 | Patrick Logan | Manchester | 40-year-old Logan heard intruders downstairs while he and his fiancée were in bed at their home on Cuddington Avenue, Withington, Manchester, on 28 July 1999. He was on the phone to the emergency services to report the break-in when one of the two intruders – a man in a mask – entered the bedroom and fired five shots, two of which hit him. Logan was acquitted of a non-fatal shooting in 1997, and it was a line of enquiry that his murder was a revenge attack. |
| July 1999 | Martin Bennett | Manchester | Gang member Bennett was taken to hospital and died on 31 July 1999 after being shot in Moss Side, Manchester. The shooting followed a quarrel the 25-year-old had got into outside a newsagent's shop. |
| August 1999 | Dorrie McKie | Manchester | 20-year-old McKie was chased by three bandanna-wearing youths on bicycles and shot dead in Hulme, an inner city area of Manchester, on 3 August 1999. Nobody has been convicted of the killing, but two men did go to prison for possessing the murder weapon. |
| August 1999 | Antony Cook | Manchester | 24-year-old Cook was a passenger in a car which crashed on 15 August 1999 while being chased by another vehicle. A gunman from the pursuing car then shot him dead and wounded his driver. Reports suggested it was a gangland killing. |
| August 1999 | Austin O'Reilly | Cardiff | Two 16-year-old boys were acquitted of the manslaughter of 54-year-old O'Reilly in May 2000. He had died in hospital on 21 August 1999 after a street assault three days earlier in Clare Road, Grangetown, Cardiff. |
| August 1999 | David Scott | London | Scott, 30, was stabbed in a Tottenham underpass and died at North Middlesex Hospital in neighbouring Edmonton on 24 August 1999. A man was arrested for the murder in December 2011 and subsequently charged, but the case was dropped before it went to trial on the basis of scientific evidence which supported his innocence. |
| September 1999 | Martin Joyce | Body not found | Joyce, a 29-year-old Manchester resident, went missing after giving his sister a lift and having a night out in Ancoats on 5 September 1999. Police reclassified him as a murder victim in 2016 and conducted an unsuccessful search for his body at a former pub in that district. |
| September 1999 | Michael Smith | Canterbury, Kent | 41-year-old Smith, a taxi controller convicted of dealing cocaine, was shot dead at Lynx Taxis, Gordon Road, Canterbury, on 15 September 1999. |
| September 1999 | David Barnshaw | Stockport, Greater Manchester | The 32-year-old drug dealer died in a burning car on 20 September 1999 after being abducted and forced to drink petrol. Arran Coghlan – previously cleared of the murder of Chris Little – was prosecuted but cleared after it emerged that the police had withheld information concerning a possible alternative suspect. Coghlan went on to be charged with and cleared of a third count of murder and conspiracy to supply cocaine. |
| September 1999 | Steven Devaney | Somers Town, London | 34-year-old Devaney was stabbed in a park near his home in Chalton Street, Somers Town, on 24 September 1999. |
| September 1999 | Junior Collins | Kennington, London | 40-year-old Collins, a Jamaican visiting the UK, was killed when a bullet that had gone through the front door of a Rastafarian temple in Kennington hit him in the back and entered his heart on 29 September 1999. A 23-year-old man from Sydenham who had been evicted from the temple for dealing drugs prior to Collins's death was found not guilty of his murder but guilty of unlawful possession of a gun with intent to endanger life, as was one of his brothers. Two bursts of gunshots had been heard – one said to have been fired at the temple from the group of four the brothers belonged to, the other said to have been return fire from its front garden. |
| October 1999 | Jimmy Walker | Edinburgh | 45-year-old Walker was stabbed in the chest with a large kitchen knife on 11 October 1999. He was then found bleeding to death at the foot of stairs leading to his third-floor flat in Piershill, Edinburgh, and police were about to force entry to the property when its other resident opened the door. Walker's flatmate was acquitted of murder, having claimed to have heard the registered drug addict and alcoholic say he had been attacked but to have thought it was just a bad dream. The two were best friends and had been drinking as they waited for the pubs to open. |
| October 1999 | John Nisbet and William Lindsay | Near Elphinstone, East Lothian | The bodies of drug dealer Nisbet, 25, of Craigneuk, and his friend Lindsay, 26, of Motherwell, were found on a hilltop near Elphinstone on 13 October 1999. They had been tortured and shot dead in Lanarkshire, with their bodies then dumped and set on fire 40 miles away. It was said to have been the result of a drug war. At least five people were taken in for questioning. |
| October 1999 | David Ferguson | Bellshill, North Lanarkshire | Although a gangster was acquitted of 19-year-old Ferguson's murder when a key witness declined to give evidence, he was convicted of the 2011 murder of Graeme Ferry in 2012. Ferguson was found hacked to death with a machete in a lane off Calder Road, Mossend, during the afternoon of 13 October 1999, and a vain attempt to have the gangster retried for this killing was made after the revocation of the double jeopardy law. |
| October 1999 | Kevin Hector | Attacked in Golders Green, London, died in hospital | 27-year-old Hector, of Willesden, died in hospital on 22 October 1999 after being shot four times in a parked car in Golders Green. A second person in the car was wounded. Hector had told people shortly before the shooting that he and the other person were being followed. |
| October 1999 | Vincent Shaw | Attacked in Downham, London, died in hospital | 29-year-old Shaw was stabbed at his flat in Downham on 23 October 1999 by one of a group of people wearing balaclavas, and died in hospital in Lewisham less than an hour later. They had forced their way into the flat at around 8:00 p.m. |
| October 1999 | Judah Dewar | Manchester | The 35-year-old courier was about to get into his car in Longsight when he was shot dead on 28 October. He was not involved with any gangs and a line of enquiry was that it might have been his dark blue BMW that drew the attention of a criminal or criminals. |
| November 1999 | Peter Clark | Kensal Rise, London | 25-year-old Clark was shot dead in his Ford Escort on Kempe Road, Kensal Rise, on 5 November 1999. He may have been deceased for as long as two hours at the time of the discovery of his body, likely because it was Guy Fawkes Night and the sound of the shooting was thus mistaken for that of fireworks going off. |
| November 1999 | Alan Rosser | Attacked in Blackpool, died in hospital in Preston (both in Lancashire) | Rosser suffered an attempted kidnap in March 1999, but no link was found between that and the fatal shooting of the 34-year-old at his car repair workshop on 12 November. Police explored the theory that he was involved in drug trafficking. |
| November 1999 | Graham James | Stoke Newington, London | 27-year-old James, a security business owner and former soldier, was shot in the chest at The Point, a nightclub in Stoke Newington, on 29 November 1999. Within three weeks of the shooting (which was apparently triggered by a quarrel), his mother fell to her own death from the 14th floor of a tower block in Kirkby, near Liverpool. |
| December 1999 | Tommy Hole and Joey Evans | Canning Town, London | 57-year-old Hole and 55-year-old Evans were shot by two masked men while watching a football match in the Beckton Arms pub in Canning Town on 5 December 1999. Hole, who had recently been released from prison for armed robbery, had been charged years previously with the June 1982 murder of Nicky Gerard, but it is not known whether that incident had anything to do with the one at the Beckton Arms. Legal action against Hole over Gerard's death had ceased because a crucial witness had acknowledged his inability to positively identify Hole as having been at the crime scene. |
| December 1999 | John Roche | Bow, London | 62-year-old Roche's body was found with skull fractures at his home in Brokesley Street, Bow, on 16 December 1999. He had been beaten with a shovel. Police arrested and released a next-door neighbour who had previously been given a 46-month prison sentence for stalking a woman bearing a resemblance to the actress Pamela Anderson. |
| December 1999 | Emily Messer | Rochester, Kent | 15-month-old Messer died from shaken baby syndrome on 18 or 19 December 1999. Her parents and two other children were believed to have been at her home in Rochester when the incident occurred there. |
| December 1999 | Simon Brown | Manchester | A Christmas party at a community centre in Cheetham Hill, Manchester, had just ended when 27-year-old Brown was shot as he left the building at about 5:45 a.m. on Boxing Day. Detectives examined the possibility of a grudge killing. |
| December 1999 | Flamur Daci | Attacked in Gravesend, died in hospital in Dartford (both in Kent) | 28-year-old Daci, an Albanian refugee, was stabbed multiple times during a group fight at Gravesend railway station on 28 December 1999. Fellow Eastern Europeans were thought to have comprised the rest of the group. |
| December 1999 | Babatunde Oba | Attacked in Ealing, London, died in hospital | 24-year-old Oba died at Ealing Hospital, Southall, on 30 December 1999 after being stabbed when he intervened in an argument at a nightclub in Ealing the night before. Four men, one of them a former professional footballer, were jailed for life for his murder in December 2000, but their convictions were quashed in 2004. |

== See also ==
- List of people who disappeared mysteriously
- The Disappeared (Northern Ireland)
- List of bombings during the Troubles
- Chris Clark, British author who writes and produces documentaries about unsolved crimes
- David Smith, convicted killer suspected of being responsible for unsolved murders
