= Murdered sex workers in the United Kingdom =

This is a list of sex workers who were murdered in the United Kingdom.

== 19th century ==
Date	Victim	Location	Cause of Death	Murderer	Notes
1837	Eliza Davies	Frederick Street, London	Throat cut		Francois Courvosier is suspected of her murder
1838	Eliza Grimwood	Waterloo Road, London	Throat cut		Francois Courvosier is suspected of her murder
24 Aug 1876	Emma Rolfe	Midsummer Common, Cambridge	Throat cut	Robert Browning was hanged for her murder	
23 Mar 1879	Eliza Patten	Liverpool, Merseyside	Stabbed in neck	Thomas Johnson was hanged for her murder	
4 April 1888	Emma Elizabeth Smith	Whitechapel, London	Peritonitis		Died of injuries sustained after being attacked the previous day. Possible victim of Jack the Ripper
7 Aug 1888	Martha Tabram	Whitechapel, London	Stabbed		Possible victim of Jack the Ripper
31 Aug 1888	Mary Ann Nichols	Whitechapel, London	Throat cut	Jack the Ripper (Identity unknown)	Jack the Ripper victims
8 Sept 1888	Annie Chapman	Spitalfields, London	Throat cut	Jack the Ripper (Identity unknown)	Jack the Ripper victims
30 Sept 1888	Elizabeth Stride	Whitechapel, London	Throat cut	Jack the Ripper (Identity unknown)	Jack the Ripper victims
30 Sept 1888	Catherine Eddowes	City of London	Throat cut	Jack the Ripper (Identity unknown)	Jack the Ripper victims
9 Nov 1888	Mary Jane Kelly	Spitalfields, London	Throat cut	Jack the Ripper (Identity unknown)	Jack the Ripper victims
20 Dec 1888	Rose Mylett	Poplar, London	Strangled with a rope		Possible victim of Jack the Ripper
10 Feb 1889	Louisa Smith	Lewisham, London	Fractured skull caused by a blow with a blunt instrument.		
4 June 1889	Elizabeth Jackson	Horsleydown, London			Her dismembered remains were found in the Thames; one of the Thames Torso Murders
17 July 1889	Alice McKenzie	Whitechapel, London	Throat cut		Possible victim of Jack the Ripper
13 Feb 1891	Frances Coles	Whitechapel, London	Throat cut		Possible victim of Jack the Ripper

== 1900 – 1909 ==
Date	Victim	Location	Cause of Death	Murderer	Notes
30 May 1901	Annie Austin	Spitalfields, London	Stabbed in the vagina and the anus		
11 Sept 1907	Emily 'Phyllis' Dimmock	Camden, London	Throat cut		Known as the 'Camden Town Murder'. Robert Wood was accused and acquitted
17 Oct 1908	Esther Prager	Russell Square, London			

== 1910 – 1919 ==
Date	Victim	Location	Cause of Death	Murderer	Notes
5 May 1912	Maud Mills	Walsall, West Midlands	Shot 4 times		Died of her injuries 6 days later.
2 Aug 1919	Bertha Frazer	Wolverhampton, West Midlands	Throat cut		
25 Dec 1919	Elizabeth McDermott aka 'Bella Wilson'	Liverpool, Merseyside			

== 1920 – 1929 ==
Date	Victim	Location	Cause of Death	Murderer	Notes
6 Mar 1922	Gertrude Yates	Fulham, London	Bludgeoning and asphyxiation	Ronald True	
27 Jan 1923	Mary Pelham	Portsmouth, Hampshire	Head injuries		
12 Mar 1929	Katherine Peck aka 'Carbolic Kate'	Walworth, London	Throat cut		Frederick Murphy was acquitted of her murder.

== 1930 – 1939 ==
Date	Victim	Location	Cause of Death	Murderer	Notes
2 Jan 1931	Margaret Schofield	Dewsbury, Yorkshire	Multiple blows to the head		
22 Feb 1932	Dora Lloyd	Maida Vale, London	Strangulation		
4 Nov 1935	Josephine Martin aka 'French Fifi'	Soho, London	Strangled with a silk stocking		The murders of Martin, Cotton, and Hind have been linked. All three were strangled in their rooms.
16 April 1936	Jeanette Cotton	Soho, London	Strangled with her own silk scarf		The murders of Martin, Cotton, and Hind have been linked. All three were strangled in their rooms.
9 May 1936	Constance May Hind	Soho, London	Strangled with an electric light flex		The murders of Martin, Cotton, and Hind have been linked. All three were strangled in their rooms.
26 May 1936	Phyllis Spiers	Folkestone, Kent	Strangled with a scarf		A client was charged with her murder but acquitted

== 1940 – 1949 ==
Date	Victim	Location	Cause of Death	Murderer	Notes
10 Feb 1942	Evelyn Oatley aka Leta Ward	Soho, London	Strangled and throat cut	Gordon Frederick Cummins (The Blackout Ripper) was hanged for their murders.	Victim of the Blackout Ripper
11 Feb 1942	Margaret 'Pearl' Lowe	Marylebone, London	Strangled with a silk stocking	Gordon Frederick Cummins (The Blackout Ripper) was hanged for their murders.	Victim of the Blackout Ripper
12 Feb 1942	Doris Jouannet	Paddington, London	Strangled with a scarf	Gordon Frederick Cummins (The Blackout Ripper) was hanged for their murders.	Victim of the Blackout Ripper
20 Feb 1942	Peggy Richards	Waterloo, London	Drowned after being strangled and thrown into the Thames		Canadian soldier Joseph McKinstry was charged with her murder but acquitted in court.
19 May 1942	Agnes Stafford	Holborn, London	Strangled with her own summer dress		
25 Jul 1942	Mary McLeod	Stepney, London	Strangulation	Thomas Bragg was charged with her murder but found not guilty on the trial judge's orders.	
24 Aug 1943	Ruth Fuerst	Notting Hill, London	Strangulation	First known victim of serial killer John Christie.	
13 Dec 1944	Evelyn Hatton	Mayfair, London	Strangulation		
5 Feb 1945	Eileen Cook aka 'Irish Molly'	Bethnal Green, London	Stabbed & strangled		
Aug 1946	Olive Balchin	Manchester, England	Hammer blows to the head	Walter Rowland was hanged for her murder in February 1947	
9 Dec 1946	Margaret Cook	Soho, London	Shot	Unnamed 91 year old confessed to her murder in July 2015	
8 Aug 1947	Isabel Wardle	Portsmouth, Hampshire	Strangled with a lanyard		
8 Sept 1947	Rita Green aka 'Black Rita	Soho, London	Shot		
5 Sept 1948	Dora Freedman	Covent Garden, London	Stabbed		Soho “enforcer” Tony Machin was suspected of her murder
12 Mar 1949	Kathleen Higgins aka 'Irish Kit'	Regents Park, London	Strangled with a scarf		77 years old and still an active prostitute

== 1950 – 1959 ==
Date	Victim	Location	Cause of Death	Murderer	Notes
31 Jan 1953	Kathleen Maloney	Notting Hill, London	Gassed	John Christie	Christie confessed to 7 murders including Kathleen Maloney but was only tried for the murder of his wife. He was convicted and hanged
6 Sept 1954	Ellen Carlin aka 'Red Helen'	Pimlico, London	Strangled with one of her black nylon stockings	Scottish serial killer Peter Manuel confessed to her murder shortly before he was hanged in 1958	
Sept 1955	Alice Barton	Wirral, Merseyside	Strangulation		Known as the 'Pillbox Murder'
17 June 1959	Elizabeth Figg	Chiswick, London	Strangulation		Possible victim of 'Jack The Stripper'

== 1960 – 1969 ==
Date	Victim	Location	Cause of Death	Murderer	Notes
8 Nov 1963	Gwynneth Rees	Mortlake, London	Strangulation		Possible victim of 'Jack The Stripper'
2 Feb 1964	Hannah Tailford	Hammersmith, London	Strangulation	Jack The Stripper	Jack The Stripper victim
8 April 1964	Irene Lockwood	Hammersmith, London	Strangulation	Jack The Stripper	Jack The Stripper victim
24 April 1964	Helen Barthelemy	Brentford, London	Strangulation	Jack The Stripper	Jack The Stripper victim
14 July 1964	Mary Flemming	Chiswick, London	Strangulation	Jack The Stripper	Jack The Stripper victim
25 Nov 1964	Margaret McGowan aka Frances Brown	Kensington, London	Strangulation	Jack The Stripper	Jack The Stripper victim
16 Feb 1965	Bridget 'Bridie' O'Hara	Acton, London	Strangulation	Jack The Stripper	Jack The Stripper victim
6 Feb 1966	Peggy Flynn	Dalkey, County Dublin	Strangled with one of her own stockings		An Irishman serving in the British Army's Parachute Regiment confessed but was acquitted in court

== 1970 – 1979 ==
Date	Victim	Location	Cause of Death	Murderer	Notes
21 June 1971	Glenys Johnson	Cardiff	Throat and other parts of body cut with glass	Malcolm Green was given a 25-year minimum term of imprisonment for her murder	One year after his release from prison in 1989, Green murdered a New Zealand tourist and was given a whole-life tariff
21 April 1972	Maxwell 'Michelle' Confait	Catford, London	Strangulation. His house was then set on fire	In 1980, two inmates were overheard discussing the killing in prison, but as they both blamed each other for the murder neither could be prosecuted for it.	3 youths were charged with murder and arson. One was found guilty of arson, one guilty of manslaughter and arson, the third guilty of murder and arson. On appeal all convictions were overturned.
4 December 1972	Nora Wilfred	Cardiff, Wales	Stabbed more than twenty times		
24 March 1973	Mary Armstrong	Stoke-on-Trent, Staffordshire	Stabbed		Four trials for her murder were held, with a 33-year-old man being acquitted of it at the end of the last one. The number of days covered by the trials (63 in total) caused the case to make legal history in Britain.
22 February 1974	Rosina Hilliard	Leicester	Hit by a car, head injuries, strangulation		It is not known which injury killed her
1 June 1974	Eileen Cotter	London	Strangulation	80-year-old John Apelgren was convicted of her killing in 2023	Apelgren was caught after a DNA match
Summer 1974	'The Duchess'	Great Yarmouth, Norfolk	Disappeared without a trace		A headless body found in Swaffham, Norfolk on 27 August 1974 may be her.
7 January 1975	Barbara Booth	Leeds, Yorkshire		Mark Rowntree was convicted of her manslaughter on the grounds of diminished responsibility. He was detained indefinitely by the court	Murdered in her home alongside her son, Alan
30 Oct 1975	Wilma McCann	Leeds, Yorkshire	Hammer blows to head & multiple stab wounds	Peter Sutcliffe (The Yorkshire Ripper) was sentenced to life imprisonment for 13 murders	Yorkshire Ripper victim
23 Nov 1975	Joan Harrison	Preston, Lancashire	Kicked to death	Christopher Smith	In 2011, Lancashire police stated they would have had enough evidence to charge Christopher Smith of Leeds based on advances in DNA testing and a confession written shortly before his death in 2008.
20 Jan 1976	Emily Jackson	Leeds, Yorkshire	Hammer blows to head & multiple stab wounds	Peter Sutcliffe (The Yorkshire Ripper)	Yorkshire Ripper victim
5 Feb 1977	Irene Richardson	Leeds, Yorkshire	Hammer blows to head & multiple stab wounds	Peter Sutcliffe (The Yorkshire Ripper)	Yorkshire Ripper victim
22 March 1977	Barbara Young	Doncaster, Yorkshire	Blows to the face		Believed to be a victim of robbery as handbag was stolen
23 April 1977	Patricia "Tina" Atkinson	Bradford, Yorkshire	Hammer blows to head	Peter Sutcliffe (The Yorkshire Ripper)	Yorkshire Ripper victim
1 Oct 1977	Jean Jordan	Manchester, England	Hammer blows to head	Peter Sutcliffe (The Yorkshire Ripper)	Yorkshire Ripper victim
21 Jan 1978	Yvonne Pearson	Bradford, Yorkshire	Hammer blows to head	Peter Sutcliffe (The Yorkshire Ripper)	Yorkshire Ripper victim
31 Jan 1978	Helen Rytka	Huddersfield, Yorkshire	Hammer blows to head	Peter Sutcliffe (The Yorkshire Ripper)	Yorkshire Ripper victim
16 May 1978	Vera Millward	Manchester, England	Hammer blows to head	Peter Sutcliffe (The Yorkshire Ripper)	Yorkshire Ripper victim
Sept 1978	Margaret Berridge	Cardiff, Wales	Strangulation	Richard Ball was jailed for life for her murder	
20 March 1979	Carol Lannen	Dundee, Scotland	Strangulation		Her body was discovered in a wood
28 August 1979	Wendy Jenkins	Bristol, England	Stab and head injuries		

== 1980 – 1989 ==
Date	Victim	Location	Cause of Death	Murderer	Notes
20 August 1980	William "Billy" Sutherland	London	Strangulation	Dennis Nilsen	Nilsen killed at least 12 men or boys between 1978 and 1983, some of whom have been identified as sex workers.
October 1980	Unidentified male	London	Strangulation	Dennis Nilsen	Nilsen killed at least 12 men or boys between 1978 and 1983, some of whom have been identified as sex workers.
2 Jul 1981	Karen Price	Cardiff, Wales		Idris Ali & Alan Charlton convicted of murder.	Ali's conviction overturned on appeal. He pleaded guilty to manslaugher.
1981	Margaret Crowley	Bristol, England	Strangulation	Brian Peel was jailed for her murder	
7 Apr 1983	Sheila Anderson	Edinburgh, Scotland	Run over repeatedly		Her killer has never been found
25 Dec 1983	Julie Gardner	Liverpool, England	Neck Injuries		Known as the 'Green door Murder'.
25 May 1984	Yvonne Coley	Kings Heath, Birmingham	Strangled		Alun Kyte, the killer of two other sex workers, was suspected of Yvonne's murder; however, no official charges were filed against him in this case.
21 April 1985	Jackie Waines aka Linda Guest	Bristol, England	Stabbed		
December 1985	Deborah Kershaw	Bradford, Yorkshire	Strangulation	George Naylor was jailed for her murder	2 years after his release from jail he murdered Maureen Stepan in her flat in Bradford in 1995
2 May 1986	Julie Perigo	Sunderland, Tyne and Wear	Stabbed		
24 January 1987	Marina Monti	Shepherd's Bush, London	Strangled		Sex worker Rachel Applethwaite was found dead nearby the next day, but investigators eventually ruled out a link between the deaths. A Mexican handed himself in to the police after finding out from Crimewatch that they were interested in speaking to a man whose description matched his, but they did not charge him with either woman's murder.
25 January 1987	Rachel Applethwaite	Chelsea, London	Beaten and stamped on		Found dead the day after Marina Monti, although investigators eventually ruled out a link between the deaths. A Mexican handed himself in to the police after finding out from Crimewatch that they were interested in speaking to a man whose description matched his, but they did not charge him with either woman's murder.
2 April 1987	Rita Parminter aka Apricot Lil	Hastings, East Sussex	Strangled	Leonard Tedham, a former Hell's Angel, was jailed for life for her murder in 1988	
14 Feb 1988	Lynette Deborah White	Cardiff, Wales	Throat cut	Jeffrey Gafoor was convicted of her murder in July 2003 and sentenced to life imprisonment.	Tony Paris, Yusef Abdullahi, Stephen Miller, Ronnie Actie & John Actie charged with her murder. In November 1990 Paris, Abdullahi & Miller were convicted, the Actie cousins were acquitted. Paris, Abdullahi & Miller's convictions we overturned on appeal in December 1992.
March 1988	Donna Healey	Leeds			Her body was discovered in a Chapel Allerton park in January 1991, but it wasn't known whose it was until DNA advances made identifying it as hers possible in 2003. In a state of mummification when it was found, the body had been stored in a cool and dry place for a considerable amount of time. She is a suspected victim of John Taylor.
5 April 1988	Andrea Sinclair	Manchester	Strangulation	Strangled with a tie and mutilated. Keith Pollard was jailed for her murder.	
18 Oct 1988	Linda Donaldson	Liverpool, Merseyside			Her mutilated body was found at Lowton near Warrington

== 1990 – 1999 ==
Date	Victim	Location	Cause of Death	Murderer	Notes
Jan 1990	Michelle Raynor	Leicester, Leicestershire			
Feb 1990	Arminda Perry	Clwyd, Wales		Her husband was jailed for her murder	Perry dismembered her body, cooked it and fed it to his cat
23 June 1990	Patricia Parsons	Epping Forest, Essex	Shot 3 times with a crossbow		
5 Sept 1990	Gail Whitehouse	Birmingham, West Midlands	Strangulation		David Williams was acquitted of her murder
Jan 1991	Maria Requena	Bolton, Greater Manchester			Her dismembered body was found near Warrington
17 Feb 1991	Janine Downes	Shifnal, Shropshire	Strangulation & head wounds		Possible victim of Alun Kyte, the 'Midlands Ripper'
14 May 1991	Glenda Potter	Rochester, Kent	Strangled		
9 June 1991	Lynne Trenholm	Chester, Cheshire	Stabbed		
9 July 1991	Julie Dart	Leeds, Yorkshire	Blows to head	Michael Sams was jailed for her murder	
10 Aug 1991	Sharon Hoare	Fulham, London	Strangulation		Possible victim of the Camden Ripper
31 Aug 1991	Sarah Crump	Southall, London	Stabbed in neck	David Smith was convicted of her murder in a 'double jeopardy' trial in 2023	Smith had previously been acquitted of her murder in 1993, only to go on to murder fellow sex worker Amanda Walker in 1999
15 Oct 1991	Diane McInally	Glasgow, Scotland	Multiple injuries		Gangland enforcer Gary Moore and drug dealer Dale “Dagga” Clark were charged with her murder but were freed due to lack of evidence.
10 Oct 1992	Barbara Finn	Coventry, West Midlands	Disappeared		Possible victim of Alun Kyte, the 'Midlands Ripper'
20 Nov 1992	Natalie Pearman	Norwich, Norfolk	Strangulation		
May 1992	Yvonne Fitt	Otley, Yorkshire	Unknown		Her decomposed body was found 4 months later Police believe she is likely a victim of John Taylor, the killer of Leanne Tiernan.
27 Mar 1993	Carol Clark	Bristol, England	Heart attack after a violent blow to the throat		Her body was found in the Sharpness Canal. Possible victim of Alun Kyte, the 'Midlands Ripper' or Philip Smith
19 April 1993	Karen McGregor	Glasgow, Scotland	Throat compression		Her husband, Charles McGregor, stood trial for her murder but the case was found not proven.
July 1993	Mandy Duncan	Ipswich, Suffolk			Her body has never been found Possible victim of "Suffolk Strangler" Steve Wright.
Oct 1993	Kathleen Charlotte Brough	Doncaster, Yorkshire		Rosina Outram and Sandra Butcher were jailed for her murder	
21 December 1993	Fiona Ivison	Doncaster, Yorkshire	Strangulation	Client Alan Duffy was jailed for her murder	Her mother founded the Parents Against Child Sexual Exploitation organisation
30 Dec 1993	Samo Paull	Bitteswell, Leicestershire	Strangulation	Alun Kyte was convicted of her murder in March 2000	Kyte was also convicted of the murder of Tracy Turner. Dubbed the 'Midlands Ripper', he may have murdered other sex workers
Jan 1994	Janet Barron	Sheffield, Yorkshire	Stabbed	Her husband Derek Barron was convicted of her murder	
3 March 1994	Tracy Turner	Lutterworth, Leicestershire	Strangulation	Alun Kyte was convicted of her murder in March 2000	Kyte was also convicted of the murder of Samo Paull. Dubbed the 'Midlands Ripper', he may have murdered other sex workers
7 May 1994	Emma Merry	Stoke-on-Trent, Staffs		Client Kevin Williams was convicted of her murder	
21 May 1994	Dawn Shields	Sheffield, Yorkshire	Strangulation		Her body was dumped in a shallow grave at Mam Tor in Derbyshire's Peak District. Possible victim of Alun Kyte, the 'Midlands Ripper'. A link has also been speculated between her murder and "Crossbow Cannibal" Stephen Griffiths.
5 Aug 1994	Julie Finley	Liverpool, England	Strangulation		Possible victim of Alun Kyte, the 'Midlands Ripper'. In 2019, police investigated Christopher Halliwell over the murder.
7 Aug 1994	Marina Coppell	Marylebone, London	Stabbed		
15 Oct 1994	Mandy Wix	Braintree, Essex			
10 May 1995	Sabrina Brett	Milton Keynes, Buckinghamshire			Her body was dumped in the Grand Union Canal Pimp Ian Foster was acquitted of the murder.
2 June 1995	Leona McGovern	Glasgow, Scotland	Strangulation		Her body was found in the Clyde. George Walker was acquitted of her murder
8 June 1995	Maureen Stepan	Bradford, Yorkshire	Strangulation	George Naylor was jailed for her murder	Naylor had previously murdered Deborah Kershaw in 1984
21 June 1995	Christine McGovern	Walthamstow, London	Asphyxiation		Possible victim of the Camden Ripper
6 Aug 1995	Laura Rodriguez	Brighton, East Sussex	Multiple stab wounds	Austin Rogerson was jailed for her murder in March 1996	
7 Aug 1995	Marjorie Roberts	Glasgow, Scotland			Her body was found in the Clyde
Sept 1995	Marie Garrity	Coventry, West Midlands	Disappeared		Possible victim of Alun Kyte, the 'Midlands Ripper'
9 Sept 1995	Sally Ann John	Swindon, Wiltshire			She went missing from Swindon's red light district. Her body has never been found 3 men were arrested in connection with her murder in September 2015 Possible victim of Christopher Halliwell.
7 Oct 1995	Christine Dinnie	Leith, Scotland	Multiple blows to head with car jack	John Law was jailed for her murder	
12 Dec 1995	Daniella White	Northampton, England	Unknown	Philip McKenna was jailed for her murder in Oct 97	Her naked body was found by the side of a railway line. She had been struck by a train, it's not known if this was before or after death.
Jan 1996	Angela Heys	Egerton, Lancashire	Strangled		
24 June 1996	Jacqueline Gallagher	Glasgow, Scotland	Multiple injuries		George Johnstone was tried and acquitted of her murder in June 2004
15 Aug 1996	Lucy Burchell	Birmingham, West Midlands	Heroin overdose	Tahir Khan and Rungzabe Khan were jailed for manslaughter	
Oct 1996	Caroline Creevy	Bradford, Yorkshire	Strangulation	Kenneth Valentine, aka Kenneth Anness, was jailed for her murder	
27 Oct 1996	Karen Tomlinson	Hull, Yorkshire	Beaten & strangled	Steven Price was convicted of manslaughter in 1999	
Feb 1997	Robyn Browne	Marylebone, London	Stab wounds	James Hopkins was convicted of her murder in Feb 2009	
12 June 1997	Christine Maguire	Bulwell, Nottingham	Stab wounds	Byron Smith was jailed for life in March 1998 for her murder	
25 Oct 1997	Samantha Class	Hull, Yorkshire	Beaten & strangled	Double killer Gary Allen was convicted of her murder in 2021	Allen had previously been acquitted of her murder in Feb 2000, but was re-tried after he murdered another sex worker, Alena Grlakova, in 2018
Nov 1997	Sharon Lynch	Liverpool, Merseyside	Strangulation		John Flanagan was jailed for her murder in July 1998. The conviction was quashed on appeal in May 2013
24 Nov 1997	Tracey Wylde	Glasgow, Scotland	Beaten to death	Zhi Min Chen was jailed for 20 years for Tracey's murder in May 2019.	
28 Feb 1998	Margo Lafferty	Glasgow, Scotland	Strangulation	Client Brian Donnelly was jailed for life for her murder	
May 1998	Natalie Clubb	Hull, Yorkshire	Stabbed 7 times	Boyfriend Darren Adam was jailed for life for her murder in Feb 2000	Her body was dismembered. Michael Larvin was jailed for 6 years for disposing of body parts.
30 May 1998	Hayley Morgan	Hull, Yorkshire	Heroin overdose, but had a plastic bag on her head		4 people were arrested for her murder but no charges were brought
July 1998	Julie Jones	Manchester, England	Severe crush injuries		Her body was found naked wrapped in a carpet under bushes
August 1998	Helen Sage	Manchester, England	Disappeared		Her body has never been found
28 Feb 1999	Marcella Davis	Wolverhampton, West Midlands		Paul Brumfitt was jailed for life for her murder in July 2000	Her body was dismembered
April 1999	Amanda Walker	Paddington, London		David Smith was jailed for life for her murder in December 1999	Her body was found in a shallow grave at Wisley, Surrey in June 1999 Smith had been acquitted of the murder of Sarah Crump in 1993
July 1999	Bexhe Alivica	Feltham, Middlesex	Strangulation	Daniel Hurley was jailed for life for her murder in March 2001	
16 Sept 1999	Katie Kazmi	Reading, Berkshire	Stabbed 77 times and decapitated	Winston Williams was jailed for life for her murder in May 2000	Williams had been released from Broadmoor in 1991 after stabbing two people, including a 13-year-old paperboy, in 1979.
Dec 1999	Mara Dorman	Belgravia, London	Stabbed and beaten	Her boyfriend Tony Bayram was jailed for life in Feb 2001	Her body was found in a black trunk by the side of the road at Hurstbourne Tarrant, near Andover, Hampshire on Jan 12, 2000.

== 2000 – 2009 ==
Date	Victim	Location	Cause of Death	Murderer	Notes
2000	Victoria Gerrard	Liverpool, Merseyside			
2 Feb 2000	Vicky O'Hara	Liverpool, Merseyside	Stabbed 42 times	John Leadbetter was jailed for her murder	
April 2000	Sarah Benford	Northampton, Northamptonshire	Disappeared		
11 June 2000	Kellie Pratt	Norwich, Norfolk	Disappeared		Her body has never been found
4 Sept 2000	Susan Kelly	Anfield, Merseyside	Battered to death with a porcelain pot and strangled		In 2003, Robert Brendan Collins, 31, was cleared of her murder.
Sept 2000	Kellie Mallinson	Middlesbrough, Teesside	Asphyxiation	Shaun Tuley was jailed for life in 2001 for her murder.	
Sept 2000	Vicky Glass	Danby, Yorkshire	Unknown		Two months after she went missing her naked and badly decomposed body was found dumped in a stream near Danby, Yorkshire Police believe it is possible she could be a victim of "Suffolk Strangler" Steve Wright.
9 Nov 2000	Jodie Hyde	Birmingham, West Midlands	Strangled	Philip Smith was jailed for her murder and the murder of two other women	
17 Dec 2000	Zoe Louise Parker	Chelsea Harbour, London	Unknown		Her body was dismembered. Her torso was found in the Thames, her lower part was never found. Possible victim of Anthony Hardy, the "Camden Ripper".
12 Feb 2001	Nikola “Nikki” Higgins	Stoke-on-Trent, Staffordshire	Strangled and beaten	Alan McLaren, 42, was jailed for life in February 2006 for her murder	
26 April 2001	Rebecca Hall	Bradford, Yorkshire	Head injuries		Police investigated convicted killers John Taylor and Stephen Griffiths over the murder. A 37-year-old woman was arrested and released on investigation in January 2019.
Oct 2001	Hayley Curtis	Norwich, Norfolk	Beaten to death	Philip Stanley was jailed for her murder in November 2005	Her body was found in a shallow grave near Petersfield, Hampshire
Oct 2001	Maria Toomey	Hull, Yorkshire	Head injuries	Matthew Rounce was jailed for her murder	
5 Nov 2001	Michaela Hague	Sheffield, Yorkshire	Multiple stab wounds		
11 Nov 2001	Carly Bateman	Bolton, Greater Manchester	Strangulation	Sex offender Geoffrey Porter was jailed for her murder	
13 Dec 2001	Paula Fields	London		John Patrick Sweeney was jailed for life in April 2011 for her murder, and for the murder of ex-girlfriend Melissa Halstead	Her body was dismembered before being dumped in the Regents Canal, London
Jan 2002	Sally White	Camden, London	Head injuries	Anthony Hardy (The Camden Ripper), was jailed for her murder in November 2003	Victim of The Camden Ripper
Mar 2002	Michelle Bettles	Dereham, Norfolk	Strangulation		
May 2002	Rachel Wilson	Middlesbrough, Yorkshire	Unknown	62-year-old Keith Hall was convicted of her murder in 2021	Her remains were found 27 June 2012.
31 May 2002	Donna Keogh	Middlesbrough, Yorkshire	Unknown		
1 June 2002	Danielle Moorcroft	Bolton, Greater Manchester	Head injuries	Stuart Milsted was jailed for her murder in October 2005	
26 June 2002	Rita Vilares	Kings Cross, London	Stabbed 10 times	David Herbert was jailed for her murder in January 2003	
Oct 2002	Julie Dorsett	Hackney, London	Unknown. Their bodies were dismembered		Ex-partner Sinclair Lewis was cleared of her murder
Dec 2002	Elizabeth Valad	Camden, London	Unknown. Their bodies were dismembered	Anthony Hardy (The Camden Ripper), was jailed for their murders in November 2003	Victim of The Camden Ripper
25 Dec 2002	Bridgette MacClennan	Camden, London	Unknown. Their bodies were dismembered	Anthony Hardy (The Camden Ripper), was jailed for their murders in November 2003	Victim of The Camden Ripper
Dec 2002 or Jan 2003	Becky Godden	Eastleach, Gloucestershire	Unknown	Chris Halliwell was found guilty of her murder in September 2016	Her body lay in a shallow grave for 8 years before being discovered
8 Mar 2003	Oxana Rodionova	Maida Vale, London	Strangulation	Sergey Shcherbakov was cleared of her murder but jailed for 3 years for burgling her flat	
July 2003	Damien Doolan	Manchester	Drowning	Martin Leriche was convicted of assault and murder by throwing the victim in the Rochdale Canal where he drowned.	
3 July 2003	Lisa Marie Spence	Stratford, London	Stabbed and beaten with a hammer.	Deepak Bouri, 23, and Adam Bowler, 19, were jailed for life in March 2004 for her murder	Her body was burnt
22 July 2003	Pauline Stephen	Everton, Merseyside	Unknown. Their bodies were dismembered	Client Marc Corner was detained indefinitely under the Mental Health Act	
22 July 2003	Hanane Sarah Parry	Everton, Merseyside	Unknown. Their bodies were dismembered	Client Marc Corner was detained indefinitely under the Mental Health Act	
Aug 2003	Sarah Jane Coughlan	Middlesbrough, Yorkshire	Stabbed	George Leigers was jailed for life for her murder. Leigers had only recently been released from a secure mental unit after murdering his wife in 1986.	
15 Oct 2003	Nadine Hillier	Bristol, England	Beaten and strangled	Albert Webb, 37, was jailed for life in October 2004 for her murder	
Dec 2003	Cara Martin-Brown	Ipswich, Suffolk	Kicked to death	Darren Brown, 22, was jailed for life in October 2004 for her murder	
4 Dec 2003	Joanne Broome	Renton, Scotland	Stabbed		James Campbell, 46, was acquitted of murder in Aug 2004 after the case was dropped due to lack of evidence.
1 Mar 2004	Camille Gordon	Soho, London	Stabbed		
13 Mar 2004	Chantel Taylor	Birkenhead, Merseyside	Struck in neck with meat cleaver and then dismembered	Stephen Wynne was jailed for her murder in January 2006	Her body has never been found
10 April 2004	Nasra Ismail	Kings Cross, London	Suffocated and stabbed	Daniel Archer was jailed for her murder	
24 May 2004	Joanna Colbeck	Glasgow, Scotland	Fell from tower block		Her pimp, Rose Broadley, was jailed for her murder but the conviction was overturned on appeal
23 July 2004	Niphan Trikhana	Chelsea, London		Darren Marcus Johnson was jailed for his murder	
June 2004	Qu Mei Na	Belfast, Northern Ireland		Chang Hai Zhang was jailed for her murder	
13 Sept 2004	Lyndsey Bourne	Leeds, Yorkshire	Strangulation	Stuart Burns, 30, was jailed for life in October 2005 for her murder	Her body was dismembered
2 Feb 2005	Sandra Wiles	Poole, Dorset	Strangulation	Boyfriend George Tayali was jailed for her murder	Tayali strangled her when he discovered she was working as an escort
21 Feb 2005	Susan Third	Aberdeen, Scotland	Strangulation	Joseph Harrison was jailed for her murder	
29 Mar 2005	Lomoki “Millie” Mkwananzi	Boscombe, Dorset	Strangulation & stabbing	Client Steven Smith, 24, was jailed for life in March 2006 for her murder	
30 Mar 2005	Carolyn Porter	Northampton, Northamptonshire	Stabbed	Client John David Nixon was jailed for life for her murder	
4 April 2005	Emma Caldwell	Glasgow, Scotland	Strangulation	Iain Packer was found guilty of murder in 2024.	Huseyin Cobanoglu, Halil Kandil, Abubekir Oncu and Mustafa Soylemez stood trail for her murder but the case collapsed.
16 June 2005	Rebecca Stephenson	Doncaster, Yorkshire	Beaten to death	Ronald Beardmore, 31, was jailed for life for her murder in February 2006	
26 July 2005	Adele Evans	Liverpool, Merseyside	Fractured skull		Ali Bavar was found not guilty of her manslaughter.
15 Sept 2005	Anne Marie Foy	Liverpool, Merseyside	Strangulation		David Butler was acquitted of her murder in February 2012
9 Jan 2006	Zelia Harrison	Peterborough, Cambridgeshire	Stabbed	Client Wakil Sahebzadeh was jailed for life for her murder	
17 Oct 2005	Jennifer Linton	Wolverhampton, West Midlands		Her partner, Omar Jawanda, was jailed for life for her murder	
April 2006	Jayne Payne aka Jayne Kelly, Jane Kelly	Burnley, Lancashire	Unknown		Her body was found at a deserted beauty spot. Two men were arrested in connection with her disappearance but were released without charge.
23 June 2006	Lynne Barwick	Hull, Yorkshire	Strangulation	Edward Akester, 26, was jailed for life in July 2007 for her murder	
1 July 2006	Samantha Tapper	Shrewsbury, Shropshire	Blows to head	Garry Harding, 22, was jailed for life in April 2007 for her murder and for the murder of brothel receptionist Annie Eels	The murders took place during a robbery at a brothel (Rachel's Health Spa) in Frankwell, Shrewsbury.
30 Oct 2006	Tania Nicol	Ipswich, Suffolk		Steven Gerald James Wright ('Suffolk Strangler') was convicted of all 5 murders in February 2008 and sentenced to life imprisonment with a whole life order.	Victim of the Suffolk Strangler
15 Nov 2006	Gemma Rose Adams	Ipswich, Suffolk		Steven Gerald James Wright ('Suffolk Strangler') was convicted of all 5 murders in February 2008 and sentenced to life imprisonment with a whole life order.	Victim of the Suffolk Strangler
3 Dec 2006	Anneli Sarah Alderton	Ipswich, Suffolk	Asphyxiated	Steven Gerald James Wright ('Suffolk Strangler') was convicted of all 5 murders in February 2008 and sentenced to life imprisonment with a whole life order.	Victim of the Suffolk Strangler
8 Dec 2006	Annette Nicholls	Ipswich, Suffolk		Steven Gerald James Wright ('Suffolk Strangler') was convicted of all 5 murders in February 2008 and sentenced to life imprisonment with a whole life order.	Victim of the Suffolk Strangler
10 Dec 2006	Paula Lucille Clennell	Ipswich, Suffolk	Strangulation	Steven Gerald James Wright ('Suffolk Strangler') was convicted of all 5 murders in February 2008 and sentenced to life imprisonment with a whole life order.	Victim of the Suffolk Strangler
3 Mar 2007	Susan Shivers	Glasgow, Scotland	Stabbed	Stephen Muirhead was detained indefinitely for her murder	
Aug 2007	Xiao Mei Guo	Whitechapel, London	Unknown, their bodies were never found	Client Derek Brown was jailed for their murders	
18 Sept 2007	Bonnie Barrett	Whitechapel, London	Unknown, their bodies were never found	Client Derek Brown was jailed for their murders	
Sept 2007	Sarah Elizabeth Mournian	Huddersfield, Yorkshire		Kevin Newton was jailed for life for her murder	
4 Oct 2007	Geraldine Brocklehurst	Huddersfield, Yorkshire	Stabbed	Shayne Haynes was jailed for life for her murder	
Dec 2007	Claire Laggan	Doncaster, Yorkshire		Alan Leslie Gregory was jailed for life for her murder	
31 July 2008	Gemma Dorman	Battersea, London	Stabbed	Her ex-boyfriend Vikramgit Singh was jailed for life for her murder	
27 Nov 2008	Joanne Cooley	Thorne, Yorkshire	Multiple stabbings	Her boyfriend Jason Goodwin was jailed for her manslaughter	
19 Dec 2008	Laura Milne	Aberdeen, Scotland	Stabbed	Stuart Jack, 22, was jailed for life for her murder. Debbie Buchan, 18, and Leigh McKinnon, 18, were both jailed for 9 years for attempted murder.	
22 Dec 2008	Cheryl Camm	Doncaster, Yorkshire	Beaten to death	Kieran Blackwell was jailed for life for her murder	
27 Mar 2009	Kirsty Grabham	Swansea, South Wales		Her husband Paul Grabham was jailed for her murder	
22 June 2009	Susan Rushworth	Bradford, Yorkshire		Stephen Shaun Griffiths ('The Crossbow Cannibal') was convicted of 3 murders in December 2010 and sentenced to a whole life tariff.	Victim of the Crossbow Cannibal
Oct 2009	Andrea Waddell	Brighton, East Sussex	Strangulation	Client Neil McMillan was jailed for her murder	
5 Nov 2010	Destiny Lauren	Kentish Town, London	Strangulation	Client Leon Fyle was jailed for her murder after a retrial	

== 2010 – 2019 ==
Date	Victim	Location	Cause of Death	Murderer	Notes
26 April 2010	Shelley Armitage	Bradford, Yorkshire		Stephen Shaun Griffiths ('The Crossbow Cannibal')	Victims of the Crossbow Cannibal
21 May 2010	Suzanne Blamires	Bradford, Yorkshire		Stephen Shaun Griffiths ('The Crossbow Cannibal')	Victims of the Crossbow Cannibal
14 Mar 2011	Louisa Brannan	Sutton, London	Stabbed & beaten	Reece Ludlow was jailed for her murder	
18 March 2012	Yong Li Qui	Bedford, Bedfordshire	Battered to death	Former employee, Gang Wang, was jailed for her murder	
16 April 2012	Carole Waugh	Marylebone, London	Battered to death	Conman Bhayani was jailed for her murder	
4 June 2012	Kelly Davies	Bolton, Greater Manchester	Stabbed	Her ex-partner, Joseph Davies, was jailed for her murder	
30 Jan 2013	Georgiana Stuparu aka Yudha Marin	Coventry, West Midlands	Stabbed	Philippe Andre Burger and Ramona Budiencea were jailed for her murder	
29 Oct 2013	Mariana Popa	Ilford, London	Stabbed	Farooq Shah was jailed for her murder	
Nov 2013	Bernadeta Nawracaj aka Julia Anders	Richmond, London	Stabbed	Fellow prostitute Edyta Zawadska, 24, was jailed for life for her murder in June 2014	Zawadska killed her out of jealousy because she was earning more money
28 Jan 2014	Maria Duque-Tunjano	Earls Court, London	Bludgeoned to death	Robert Fraser was sent to Broadmoor for her murder	
17 Feb 2014	Karolina Nowikiewisz	Slough, Berkshire	Throat cut	Michael Wenham was jailed for her murder	
16 Mar 2014	Rivka Holden	Colindale, London	Multiple stab wounds	Client Nicolae Patraucean was jailed for her murder	
6 April 2014	Yvette Hallsworth	Derby, Derbyshire	Stabbed	Mateusz Kosecki was jailed for her murder	
19 Nov 2014	Lidia Pascale	West Bromwich, West Midlands	Head injuries	Matthew Cherrington was jailed for her murder	
5 Dec 2014	Luciana Maurer	Falkirk, Scotland	Multiple stab wounds	Steven Mathieson was jailed for her murder	
1 Feb 2015	Christina Randell aka Christina Spillane	Hull, Yorkshire	Stabbed & strangled	Her partner Deland Allman was jailed for her murder	
28 Mar 2015	Vanessa Santillan	Fulham, London	Strangulation	Her husband Joaquin Gomez Hernandez was jailed for her murder	
21 June 2015	Jennifer Williams	Bournemouth, Dorset	Stabbing	Stefan Mayne was sentenced to life imprisonment for her murder in May 2016	
23 June 2015	Anita Kapoor	Gerrards Cross, Buckinghamshire	Asphyxiation	Navin Mohan was sentenced to life imprisonment for her murder in December 2015	
30 July 2015	Denisa Silmen	East Ham, London	Multiple stab wounds	Alin Apopei was sentenced to life imprisonment for her murder in February 2017	
28 Sep 2015	Maxine Showers	Liverpool, Merseyside	Head injury	Michael Williams was jailed for her murder	
23 Dec 2015	Daria Pionko	Leeds, Yorkshire		Lewis Pierre was jailed for her murder	
January 2016	Georgina Symonds	Llanmartin, Wales	Strangulation	Her millionaire 'sugar daddy', Peter Morgan, was jailed life for her murder in Dec 2016	
12 Feb 2016	Nkechi 'Jessica' McGraa	Aberdeen, Scotland	Asphyxiation	Client Bala Chinda was jailed for life for her murder	
July 2016	Leonuta Ioana Haidemac	Skegness, Lincolnshire	Strangled & stabbed	Client Casey Scott was jailed for life for her murder	Scott, a Jack the Ripper fanatic, scrawled 'Jack' across her abdomen.
29 May 2017	Romina Kalachi	Kilburn, London	Stabbed	Noor Mohammed was sentenced to life imprisonment for her murder	
25 May 2018	Christina Abbotts	Crawley, West Sussex	Multiple head injuries	Zahid Naseem was found guilty of her murder on 20 December 2018	

== 2020 – 2025 ==
Date	Victim	Location	Cause of Death	Murderer	Notes
9 September 2022	Samantha Holden	Farnborough, Hampshire	Strangulation	Adam Watson was jailed for her murder	
25 October 2023	Louisa Hall	Leeds, West Yorkshire	Strangulation	Steven Francis was jailed for her murder	
10 November 2023	Victoria Greenwood	Letchworth Garden City, Hertfordshire	Bludgeoned to death	Robert Brown was jailed for her murder	
11 August 2025	Shara Millar	Smethwick, West Midlands	Strangled	Tanveer Singh has been charged with murder; trial yet to conclude	
17 March 2025	Carmenza Valencia Trujillo	Walworth, London		Simon Levy was found guilty of Trujillo's and Wilkins' murders on 7 August 2026	Levy was found to have convictions for violence against women dating back to July 2018, including assault on a female prison officer in HMP Brixon and assaults against 10 women on public transport.
24 August 2025	Sheryl Wilkins	Tottenham, London		Simon Levy was found guilty of Trujillo's and Wilkins' murders on 7 August 2026	Levy was found to have convictions for violence against women dating back to July 2018, including assault on a female prison officer in HMP Brixon and assaults against 10 women on public transport.

== Serial murderers ==
- Alun Kyte (Midlands Ripper)
- Anthony Hardy (Camden Ripper)
- Gordon Cummins (Blackout Ripper)
- David Smith, acquitted of a murder of a sex worker in 1993 only to murder another in 1999
- Jack the Ripper
- Jack the Stripper
- Peter Sutcliffe (Yorkshire Ripper)
- Philip Smith
- Stephen Griffiths (Crossbow Cannibal)
- Steve Wright (Suffolk Strangler)
- Thomas Cream (Lambeth Poisoner)

== See also ==
- English Collective of Prostitutes
- Manchester Action on Street Health
- Prostitution in the United Kingdom
- Sex Worker Advocacy and Resistance Movement
- Sex workers' rights
- UK Network of Sex Work Projects
- United Sex Workers
