= Anthony Hardy =

English serial killer (1951-2020)

- Born: Anthony John Hardy; 31 May 1951; Burton upon Trent, Staffordshire, England
- Died: 25 November 2020 (aged 69); HM Prison Frankland, County Durham, England
- Other name: Camden Ripper
- Conviction: Murder
- Penalty: Whole life tariff

Details
- Victims: 3 convicted, 4-9 suspected
- Span of crimes: December 2000 – December 2002
- Country: United Kingdom
- Date apprehended: 2 January 2003

Anthony John Hardy (31 May 1951 – 25 November 2020) was an English serial killer who was known as the Camden Ripper for beheading and dismembering some of his victims. In November 2003, he was sentenced to three life terms for three murders, but police believe he may have been responsible for up to six more.

== Early life ==
Born in Burton upon Trent, Staffordshire, Hardy had an apparently uneventful childhood and excelled in school and college. He earned an engineer's degree from Imperial College London and subsequently became the manager of a large company. Hardy married and fathered three sons and one daughter; in 1982, he was arrested in Tasmania for trying to drown his wife, but the charges were later dropped. In 1986, Hardy's wife, Judith, divorced him.

After the divorce, Hardy spent time in mental hospitals, diagnosed with bipolar disorder. He was also treated in psychiatric hospitals across London for depression, drug-induced psychosis and alcohol abuse. He lived in various hostels in London, picking up convictions for theft and being drunk and disorderly. He was arrested in 1998 when a prostitute accused him of raping her, but the charges were dropped due to lack of evidence. He became an alcoholic and diabetic.

== Murders ==
In January 2002, police were called to the block of flats where Hardy lived by a neighbour complaining that someone had vandalised her front door and that she strongly suspected Hardy. When the police investigated Hardy's flat, they found a locked door and, despite his claims to the contrary, found that Hardy had a key to it. In the room, the police found the naked dead body of a woman lying on a bed with cuts and bruises on her head. She was identified as Sally White, 38, a woman who had been living in London.

Forensic pathologist Freddy Patel subsequently concluded that White had died of a heart attack, in spite of the circumstances. Patel later came under scrutiny for this and other findings in his career, including the 2009 death of Ian Tomlinson, resulting in a suspension from the government's register of pathologists pending an inquiry. In 2012, he was struck off the medical register by the General Medical Council, meaning that he can no longer practise medicine in the United Kingdom.

Hardy pleaded guilty to a charge of criminal damage and claimed that due to his drinking problem he had no knowledge of how White came to be in his flat. Whilst in custody Hardy was transferred to a psychiatric hospital, under section 37 of the Mental Health Act 1983, remaining there until November 2002.

== Arrest and trial ==
On 30 December 2002, a homeless person scavenging in school bins found the dismembered body parts of two women, wrapped in black plastic bin-liners. The victims were identified as Bridgette MacClennan, 34, and Elizabeth Valad, 29. The investigation led to Hardy, who was arrested a week later. He had gone on the run but was spotted by an off-duty policeman when he went to University College Hospital to collect his prescription for insulin. During a search of the grounds of the hospital, Hardy was found hiding behind bins. A fight took place as he resisted arrest, during the course of which a police officer was knocked unconscious and another officer was stabbed through the hand and had his eye dislocated from its socket. Despite suffering these injuries, the wounded police officer held Hardy until backup arrived and he was arrested at the scene. A subsequent search of his flat found evidence, including old blood stains, indicating the two women had been killed and dismembered there. Both had died over the Christmas holidays.

Under arrest, Hardy replied "no comment" to every question put to him by police. He was charged with the murders of both MacClennan and Valad, and of White, the woman whose death had originally been put down to natural causes. At his trial in November 2003 Hardy, despite his initial lack of cooperation with the police, abruptly changed his plea to guilty to all three counts of murder and was sentenced to life imprisonment. Because of Hardy's history of psychiatric problems and violent behaviour, an independent enquiry was announced into his care. A November 2003 article written for the Evening Standard by Hugh Dougherty and Finian Davern suggested that Hardy was a pornography-obsessed necrophile who derived sexual gratification from posing and photographing his victims' nude corpses, and a BBC News article from the same month suggested that this photography was his primary motivation for the murders.

Hardy was diagnosed with a personality disorder. In May 2010, a High Court judge decided that Hardy should never be released from prison, placing him on the list of whole life tariff prisoners. Mr Justice Keith, sitting in London, said: "This is one of those exceptionally rare cases in which life should mean life."

== Death ==
Hardy died of pneumonia at HM Prison Frankland, County Durham, on 25 November 2020, aged 69.

== Possible links to other murders ==
It was originally reported that police believed Hardy was possibly connected to the unsolved cases of two prostitutes found dismembered and dumped in the River Thames, and up to five or six other murders that bore marked similarities to the ones for which he was convicted but where not enough evidence was available directly implicating him. One of the murders Hardy was originally linked to, that of Paula Fields whose body was dumped in the Regents Canal in 2001, was solved in 2011 when John Sweeney was convicted of her murder.

=== Murder of Zoe Parker ===
Zoe Parker

Another murder that was linked to Hardy was that of Zoe Parker, who had last been seen in Hounslow in December 2000 before her dismembered torso was found in the river. Possible links between Hardy and the Parker case were noted in the press as soon as he was apprehended in January 2003, with detectives saying that "he is a suspect for the unsolved murders of any women whose bodies have been cut up and dumped". The lower half of Parker's body was never found. Investigators were of the opinion that the body had been cut up with something sharp like a Samurai sword.

Parker's incomplete body had been found on 17 December 2000, 11 days after she disappeared. The torso was found next to Chelsea Harbour on the Thames. She was 24 years old and was also known as Cathy Dennis. She travelled around west London seeking clients, moving between Isleworth, Feltham, Hounslow and sometimes the West End, and on the night she disappeared she was in Hounslow. She was said to have often started up conversations with strangers. On the night she went missing she was seen with two men described as white and with dark hair. One was wearing a white casual jacket, dark trousers and white trainers. The other man was stocky and wearing dark clothing. Investigators also asked for a woman named Carmen or Carmel to come forward as they believed she had information on the murder, saying she was apparently a friend of Parker and came from the Hounslow or Isleworth area.

=== Other cases ===
Two of the murders linked to Hardy occurred in Nottinghamshire, near to where Hardy grew up in Burton-on-Trent.

In 2013, high-profile criminologist David Wilson released a documentary on Hardy as part of his Killers Behind Bars: The Untold Story series, in which he examined claims Hardy could be linked to the murders of London sex workers Sharon Hoare in Fulham in 1991 and Christine McGovern in Walthamstow in 1995.

In 2021, police investigated if Fred the Head, an unidentified decedent found in Burton upon Trent in 1971, may have been a victim of Hardy, a theory originating in a Facebook group dedicated to identifying the body.

== In popular culture ==
Hardy was the subject of an episode of Evil Up Close on the Crime and Investigation Network, focusing on the 2010 decision to keep Hardy in prison for the rest of his life. The film was directed by Robert Murray and written and produced by Will Hanrahan.

Hardy was the subject of a Channel 4 documentary, The Hunt for the Camden Ripper, broadcast in 2004. It was narrated by Juliet Stevenson and directed by Olly Lambert.

The 30 December discovery and resulting investigation that led to Hardy's arrest is the subject of "The Camden Ripper" episode of the podcast Scotland Yard Confidential.

== See also ==
- List of serial killers in the United Kingdom
- Murdered sex workers in the United Kingdom
- Alun Kyte (Midlands Ripper)
- David Smith, London prostitute killer
