= Bradford murders =

Serial killings of three women in Bradford, England

Stephen Griffiths
- Born: Stephen Shaun Griffiths; 24 December 1969 (age 56); Dewsbury, West Riding of Yorkshire, England
- Other name: The Crossbow Cannibal
- Education: University of Bradford
- Conviction: Murder
- Penalty: Life imprisonment (whole life order)

Details
- Victims: 3+
- Span of crimes: 22 June 2009 – 21 May 2010
- Country: England
- Date apprehended: 24 May 2010

The Bradford murders were the serial killings of three women in the city of Bradford, West Yorkshire, England in 2009 and 2010.

43-year-old Susan Rushworth disappeared on 22 June 2009, followed by 31-year-old Shelley Armitage on 26 April 2010 and 36-year-old Suzanne Blamires on 21 May of the same year. The women were all sex workers based in Bradford. Parts of Blamires's body were found in the River Aire in Shipley, near Bradford, on 25 May. Other human tissue found in the same river was later established to belong to Armitage. No remains of Rushworth were ever found.

Stephen Shaun Griffiths, 40, was arrested on 24 May and subsequently charged with killing the three women. After being found guilty, he was sentenced to life imprisonment with a whole life order.

== Conviction of Stephen Griffiths ==
Stephen Shaun Griffiths (born 24 December 1969 in Dewsbury, West Riding of Yorkshire), at the time a semi-professional postgraduate student in criminology, was arrested and in May 2010 he appeared in the magistrates' court, giving his name as "the Crossbow Cannibal."

At a Crown Court appearance that afternoon, he was remanded in custody until his next court appearance. He made a second appearance at the Crown Court on 7 June via a video link from Wakefield Prison where a trial date of 16 November 2010 was set.

On 21 December 2010, Griffiths was convicted of all three murders after pleading guilty. At Leeds Crown Court, the same day, Mr Justice Openshaw sentenced Griffiths to life imprisonment with a whole life order, meaning he will not become eligible for parole and is likely to spend the rest of his life in prison. While in prison, Griffiths has attempted suicide on several occasions. In 2011, he went on a 120-day hunger strike, during which time he avoided contact with other people.

== Post trial statements ==
Griffiths' criminal history included a three-year sentence, when aged 17, for an unprovoked knife attack on a supermarket manager. While in custody, he stated that he saw himself becoming a murderer, and psychiatrists warned that he fantasised about becoming a serial killer. In 1991, he was diagnosed as a "schizoid psychopath" and the following year received a two-year prison sentence for holding a knife to the throat of a girl.

In 2009, Griffiths was admitted to the University of Bradford to write a PhD in homicide studies.

Police had been watching Griffiths for two years before he killed his victims and had already seized hunting weapons. The police contacted the housing association which owns the flat in which Griffiths lived after he was observed reading books on dismemberment. The housing association shared the police's concerns and fitted a better CCTV system in anticipation of an incident. At the time of the murders, police had no evidence for an Anti-Social Behaviour Order.

== Government reaction ==
David Cameron, the then new Conservative prime minister, said the murders were a "terrible shock". He said the decriminalisation of offences related to prostitution should be "looked at again", but he also added that: "I don't think we should jump to conclusions on this – there are all sorts of problems that decriminalisation would bring." Later, aides close to Cameron strongly insisted he was concerned with addressing the social problems surrounding it such as encouraging agencies to work together to help women off the streets or to combat drug addiction. Cameron also called for tougher action on kerb-crawling and drug abuse. The debate as to whether a change in the law would protect sex workers soon came into question.

== Other possible victims of Griffiths ==
When he was arrested and interviewed by police in 2010, Griffiths claimed to officers to have killed a total of five sex workers in Bradford, suggesting there were two additional victims unaccounted for. However, after his conviction for the three murders in that year he refused to speak to police any longer, effectively meaning he could not be investigated for further murders.

=== Murder of Rebecca Hall ===
Rebecca Victoria Hall
- Picture of Hall used by police
- Born: Rebecca Hall; 30 December 1981
- Disappeared: 13 April 2001; Little Horton, Bradford, England
- Status: Found dead on 26 April 2001
- Died: c. On or after 13 April 2001 (aged 19); Unknown
- Cause of death: Severe head injuries
- Body discovered: Thornton Street, Bradford 53.79763568534913°N 1.7684399965127202°W
- Other name: Becky Hall
- Occupation: Sex worker

When Griffiths was first arrested for the murders in May 2010, detectives immediately investigated possible links to the 2001 murder of 19-year-old Bradford prostitute Rebecca Hall, who had been found dead in a car park 870 yards (800 m) from Griffiths' Holmfield Court flat (the same address which he was living at during his killing spree in 2009 and 2010). Griffiths knew Hall and she was known to regularly visit his flat. After his conviction in 2010, it was revealed that police had questioned Griffiths on the murder, but he refused to answer the interviewers' questions. His former partner at the time revealed that Griffiths had excitedly taken her to the place where her body had been found, and also said that the car park was next to his doctor's surgery and pharmacy. Another suspect in the murder of Hall was fellow known killer John Taylor, who had come to prominence after murdering schoolgirl Leanne Tiernan in 2000. The murder was one of several cold cases to be re-opened after Taylor's conviction and he was questioned about it, in part because evidence showed Hall's body had been stored for a period after her death, which was a known hallmark of Taylor.

In 2013, criminologist David Wilson released a documentary on Griffiths as part of his Killers Behind Bars: The Untold Story series, in which he examined unsolved murders that could be linked to Griffiths. He also linked the case of Hall to Griffiths.

In 2016, police revealed they were reviewing the Hall case to see if recent advances in forensic science could help solve the case. The former lead detective on the case revealed in 2018 that two DNA profiles had previously been extracted from Hall's clothing, but the profiles were of too poor quality at the time to determine what the full profile of the unidentified individual was. Following this, in 2019, police announced the arrest of a 37-year-old woman (who would have been the same age as Hall at the time, 19). The woman was released under investigation.

=== Dawn Shields ===
In Wilson's 2013 documentary, he also examined whether Griffiths could be linked to the murder of Sheffield prostitute Dawn Shields in May 1994. However, he concluded that a link was unlikely. The prime suspect in her murder was multiple prostitute killer Alun Kyte, who killed two prostitutes in December 1993 and March 1994 and was suspected of many more murders of prostitutes around Britain.

== See also ==
- David Smith – another British prostitute killer
