= Steven Wright (serial killer) =

English serial killer (born 1958)

- Born: Steven Gerald James Wright; 24 April 1958 (age 68); Erpingham, Norfolk, England
- Other name: Suffolk Strangler
- Convictions: Murder (x6); Kidnap; Attempted kidnap
- Penalty: Life imprisonment (whole life order)

Details
- Victims: 6+
- Span of crimes: 19 September 1999 – 9 December 2006
- Country: England
- Date apprehended: 19 December 2006
- Imprisoned at: HM Prison Long Lartin

Steven Gerald James Wright (born 24 April 1958) is an English serial killer, also known as the Suffolk Strangler. He is currently serving life imprisonment for the murder of five women who worked in Ipswich, Suffolk, in 2006. Wright was found guilty in February 2008 and given a whole life order. In February 2026, Wright pleaded guilty to the murder of a sixth victim, 17-year-old Victoria Hall in 1999.

== Early life ==
Steven Wright was born on 24 April 1958 in Erpingham, Norfolk, the second of four children of military policeman Conrad and veterinary nurse Patricia. He has an older brother and two younger sisters. While Wright's father was on military service, the family had lived in both Malta and Singapore. When Wright was six, his mother left the family; his father divorced his mother in 1978; both remarried. Wright and his siblings lived with their father, who fathered a son and a daughter with his second wife, Valerie.

In 1974, aged 16, Wright left school with no qualifications. He joined the Merchant Navy. In 1978, at age 20, he married Angela O'Donovan in Milford Haven, Pembrokeshire, Wales. They had a son. The couple separated in 1987, and later divorced. Wright became a steward on the ocean liner Queen Elizabeth 2, a lorry driver, a barman and, just prior to his arrest, a forklift truck driver. Former sex worker Lindi St Clair said that Wright attacked her in the 1980s. His second marriage was to Diane Cassell at Braintree, Essex, registry office in August 1987. They divorced in July 1988 while he was the pub landlord of The Ferry Boat Inn, Norwich.

It was during this time that Wright also managed a pub in South London. He lost this post due to his gambling and heavy drinking. Wright was convicted in 2001 of theft, having stolen £80 to pay off his debts. This was his only criminal conviction prior to the murders. Wright accrued large gambling debts, and was declared bankrupt in the late 1990s. He had twice tried to commit suicide, first by carbon monoxide poisoning in his car in 1994; secondly in 2000, by an overdose of pills.

== Suffolk murders ==
Wright met Pamela Wright (no relation) in 2001 in Felixstowe, and they moved to a house in Ipswich together in 2004. Wright had always admitted that he hired sex workers and had done so since he was in the Merchant Navy and continually throughout his life. In Ipswich, he conceded that he went to certain massage and sauna establishments that were actually brothels. During his trial, Wright stated he had gone to sex workers on many occasions, including three of the murder victims. Wright began having sex with sex workers again when his partner began working night shifts and their sex life became almost non-existent; he paid at least a dozen women for sex in the final three months of 2006.

Between 30 October and 10 December 2006, Wright murdered five women in Ipswich. Forensic evidence led to his arrest on 19 December: tiny flecks of blood were found on the back seats of Wright's Ford Mondeo which partially matched the DNA profile of murder victim Paula Clennell.

Wright was found guilty of all five murders on 21 February 2008. At Ipswich Crown Court the following day, Mr Justice Gross sentenced Wright to life imprisonment with a recommendation that he should never be released. On 19 March 2008, Wright appealed against his convictions. On 2 February 2009, Wright dropped the appeal.

== Murder of Victoria Hall ==
In July 2021 Wright was arrested, at HM Prison Long Lartin, on suspicion of murdering Victoria Hall, a 17-year-old from Trimley St Mary who was murdered on 19 September 1999, on her way home from a nightclub in Felixstowe. She was last seen alive in the early hours of the morning and her body was found in Creeting St Peter five days later. Subsequent post-mortem examinations showed suffocation as the cause of death.

Suffolk police reopened their investigation in 2019 after receiving fresh witness information. They announced that Wright had been “released under investigation, pending further inquiries”. On 7 December 2023, he was rearrested in connection with the murder of Hall, and on 22 May 2024 was charged with her murder, as well as the attempted kidnapping of another woman. He appeared via video link from HMP Long Lartin for court hearings in Ipswich on 3 June and 2 September 2024, and at the Old Bailey on 26 February 2025.

At the Old Bailey on 2 February 2026, Wright pleaded guilty to the kidnap and murder of Hall. He also admitted attempting to kidnap another woman, Emily Doherty, in Felixstowe the day before Hall was killed. On 6 February, Wright received sentences of 9 and 12 years for the attempted kidnap of Doherty, and the kidnap of Hall. He also received another life sentence with a minimum term of 40 years for Hall's murder.

== Possible links to other crimes ==
Wright is still being investigated in connection with other unsolved murders and disappearances. Experts have highlighted how it is unlikely for any serial killer to start killing at such a late stage and that serial killers almost always start killing before their mid 30s; Wright was 48 years old when the 2006 murders were committed. This indicates that Wright likely killed before in his life, and psychologists told police after the murders that it was 'highly likely' that he had done so.

Wright is one of a number of high-profile murderers or sex offenders to have been identified as possible suspects in the Suzy Lamplugh murder case; he had worked with Lamplugh on Queen Elizabeth 2 during the early 1980s. Lamplugh went missing in London in July 1986, and was legally declared dead in 1994, but her body has never been found. However, the Metropolitan Police have stated that this is not a strong line of enquiry. In 2002, the police named John Cannan as the man they believed killed Lamplugh.

Cleveland Police have not ruled out a link between Wright and the murder of Vicky Glass, a factory worker in Teesside, who vanished from Middlesbrough in September 2000, and whose naked body was later found in a brook on the North York Moors.

In 2019 Wright was linked by an ex-police officer to the murder of Jeanette Kempton in 1989. Kempton had vanished from Brixton, near where Wright lived at the time, and was later found dead many miles away in a rural location in Suffolk.

In 2021, police announced a re-investigation by a historical crimes unit into Vicky Glass's murder in order to pursue "new lines of enquiry".

=== Previous East Anglia murders ===
Wright has also been linked to the murders of other sex workers in Ipswich and in Norwich in Norfolk. When investigating the five murders committed by Wright in Ipswich in late 2006, criminologist David Wilson, who was involved in the case, stated that he felt that the murders were far too practised for someone murdering for the first time. There was a cluster of sex worker murders in Norwich in the years before the 2006 murders, which remain unsolved. Wright used to live and work in the city, and frequently returned to the city in the years after he left, usually travelling from Ipswich to Norwich once a month. He ran a pub in the middle of the red light district of Norwich, similar to how he lived in the centre of the red light district of Ipswich at the time of the 2006 murders.

Wright has been linked to the unsolved murders of:

- Amanda Duncan, Ipswich, July 1993
- Kellie Pratt, Norwich, June 2000

In June 2012, Wilson said that the killer of Norwich sex worker Michelle Bettles was likely Wright. The police responded to the suggested links between Bettles's case and Wright by saying that they had found no evidence linking Wright to the crime. It was revealed in 2019 that police had already made an arrest in April 2003 of a man whose DNA matched samples from Bettles' body, and this man admitted having picked her up for sex on 26 March 2002, two days before she was last seen. The man claimed that he was at home with a migraine on the night she was killed, but phone records show him making a large number of calls that evening although police failed to locate from where the calls were made. On 28 March 2022, police announced they had recovered further DNA profiles in Bettles' murder case, indicating Wright can be ruled out of the murder with forensic evidence.

Wright had previously also been linked by criminal experts to the unsolved murder of Norwich sex worker Natalie Pearman in November 1992. Pearman was last seen at night soliciting clients outside the Ferry Boat Inn pub, the pub that was owned and run by Wright and that was located in the heart of the city's red light district. The police cross-referenced the DNA found on Pearman's body in 1992 to Wright's, but the results were "inconclusive". However, in 2017, police announced that they had a full DNA profile of the attacker and that solving the case was simply a matter of matching the DNA to an individual, meaning that Wright could be ruled out of the murder.

Ipswich sex worker Amanda Duncan vanished after talking to a man in a car on Portman Road in the town in 1993, a road on which Wright was known to solicit sex workers, and from where some of his victims were known to have disappeared in 2006.

After Wright's murders in 2006, the police re-opened and re-examined these four cold cases to establish whether Wright could be responsible, and questioned Wright about them. Family members of the victims stated they believed he could be linked and called for the police to investigate this further and charge him for them.

== See also ==
- List of serial killers in the United Kingdom
- List of serial killers by number of victims
- Alun Kyte (Midlands Ripper)
- David Smith – British killer of sex workers
- Lorraine Thorpe – Britain's youngest female double killer, murdered two people in Ipswich in 2009
