= Forum on Prisoner Education =

Defunct UK charity

The Forum on Prisoner Education was a UK registered charity founded in 2000 to campaign to improve prison education in England and Wales. Its founding members included Professor David Wilson, and a manager of education at HMP Wandsworth in London.

Funding from the Esmee Fairbairn Charitable Trust was granted in 2003 and this enabled the appointment of a coordinator to build up the work of the forum. This funding was extended and further funding was given by the Paul Hamlyn Foundation in 2004. Patrons of the forum included Lord Woolf and Baroness Walmsley.

The forum led campaigns on a range of issues, including pay for prisoners and tutors working in prison education. It published a number of briefing papers, reports and books, including a report calling for the Internet to be made available in prisons. The forum was instrumental in the creation of the All Party Parliamentary Group for Learning & Skills in the Criminal Justice System, chaired by Baroness Veronica Linklater. Its former director, Steve Taylor, was awarded the Longford Prize in 2005 for his work in developing the Forum.

The charity closed in June 2006 due to financial difficulties. Some of the work of the charity has been continued by the Prisoners' Education Trust.
