= Murder of Emma Rolfe =

1874 murder

- Location: Cambridge, England
- Date: 24 August 1876
- Attack type: murder
- Deaths: 1
- Victim: Emma Rolfe
- Perpetrator: Robert Browning

Emma Rolfe (1860–1876) was murdered by Robert Browning in Cambridge, England. It is an example of a notorious Victorian prostitute murder in the pre-Jack the Ripper period.

== Background ==
Emma Rolfe was born and brought up in the Cambridge district of Barnwell. She was the third child of James Rolfe and Eliza Rolfe (nee Hatcarton). Her father was a baker and her mother was a dressmaker.

She had moved from the family home to live at a well-known brothel in Crispin Street, in an area known for prostitution. By 1876, Emma Rolfe was a well-known sex worker in the area.

== Murder ==
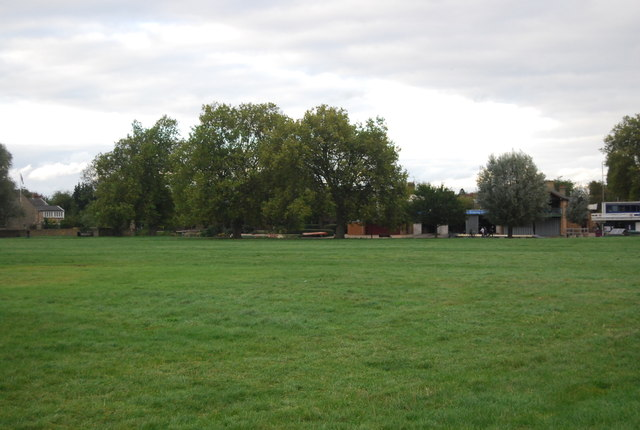
Midsummer Common (pictured in 2013)

On the evening of 24 August 1876, she met a 25-year-old former soldier named Robert Browning. Browning was a tailor who worked at a shop in Covent Garden. Robert and Emma were seen walking off to Midsummer Common together when a loud scream caused Police Constable Joseph Wheel to investigate. Browning then went to The Garrick Inn to continue drinking.

When he left he walked into Constable Wheel and told him he had murdered a woman, before leading the constable to where the body lay with her throat slit. Browning claimed he had killed the girl because she had robbed him but later confessed that the murder was premeditated. 2,000 people attended the funeral of Emma Rolfe. She was buried at Mill Road Cemetery. On 15 December 1876, Robert Browning was hanged at Cambridge Gaol.

== Legacy ==
The brutal crime inspired a poem:

Poor Emma Rolfe,

Thy fate was dreadful,

For vengeance now, your blood it cries.

We hope your precious soul's in heaven,

Far away in your blue skies.

A blue plaque hangs at the tailors shop in Covent Garden.

== See also ==
- Murdered sex workers in the United Kingdom
