= Leicester Law Courts =

Judicial building in Leicester, England

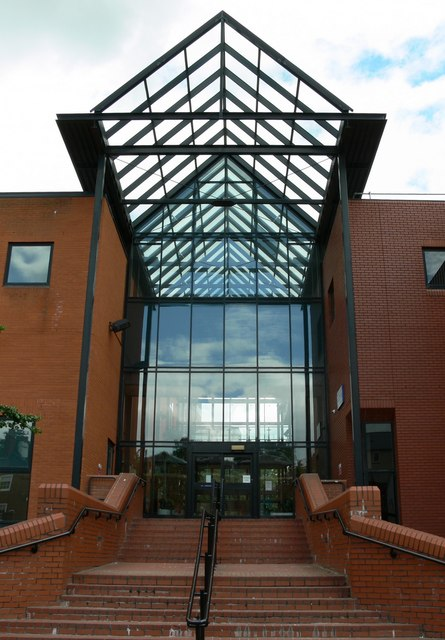
- Leicester Law Courts

- Shown in Leicestershire
- 52.6300°N 1.1272°W
- Location: Wellington Street, Leicester

History
- Built: 1981

Site notes
- Architect: Property Services Agency
- Architectural style: Modernist style

The Leicestershire Law Courts is a Crown Court venue, which deals with criminal cases, as well as a County Court venue, which deals with civil cases, in Wellington Street, Leicester, England.

== History ==
Until the early 1980s, criminal court hearings were held in the Great Hall at Leicester Castle. However, as the number of court cases in Leicester grew, it became necessary to commission a more substantial courthouse for criminal court hearings. The site selected by the Lord Chancellor's Department had accommodated a series of rows of terraced housing (Slawson Street, Ashwell Street and Elton Street) before the area was cleared.

The new building was designed by the Property Services Agency in the Modernist style, built in red brick at a cost of £4.4 million, and was opened in March 1981. Originally established to deal with Crown Court hearings only, it was extended to accommodate the County Court hearings as well in the early 1990s. The design involved an asymmetrical main frontage facing onto Wellington Street. The left hand section was formed by a two-storey block fenestrated by tall casement windows on the ground floor and by small square windows on the first floor. The central section, which was recessed, was formed by a flight of steps leading up to a glass door giving access to a full-height atrium with a steel-framed pediment, which projected forward. The right hand section, which projected forward and was fenestrated in a similar style to the left hand section, was formed by two separate blocks, the one on the left being taller than the one on the right. Internally, the building was laid out to accommodate ten courtrooms.

Notable cases have included the trial and conviction of the children's home manager, Frank Beck, in November 1991, for sexual and physical assaults against more than one hundred children in his care, the trial and conviction of the spree killer, Philip Smith, in July 2001, for the murders of three women in Birmingham, and the trial and conviction of four men, in March 2005, for the murder of two teenage girls, Charlene Ellis and Letisha Shakespeare, with a machine pistol in Aston, Birmingham.
