= Killers Behind Bars: The Untold Story =

British television documentary series

- Genre: Documentary
- Presented by: David Wilson
- Country of origin: United Kingdom
- No. of series: 2
- No. of episodes: 7

Original release
- Network: Channel 5
- Release: June 12, 2012 – April 4, 2013

Killers Behind Bars: The Untold Story is a British television documentary series. It was presented by David Wilson and was broadcast on Channel 5 in 2012 and 2013.

== Series 1 Episode 1: The Suffolk Strangler ==
- Air date: 12 June 2012

Steve Wright committed five murders in 2006. Wilson speculates that Wright murdered 22-year-old prostitute Michelle Bettles in Norfolk in March 2002.

== Series 1 Episode 2: Peter Tobin ==
- Air date: 19 June 2012

Peter Tobin was convicted of the murders of Vicky Hamilton, Dinah McNicol and Angelika Kluk. He killed Vicky in Margate, Dinah in Hampshire and Angelika in a church in Glasgow. Wilson speculates that Tobin is responsible for the murder of 22-year-old student Jessie Earl in May 1980.

== Series 1 Episode 3: Robert Black ==
- Air date: 26 June 2012

Robert Black killed three young girls and attempted to kill another. Wilson speculates that Black is responsible for the unsolved killings of 13-year-old Genette Tate in Devon and 13-year-old April Fabb in Norfolk.

== Series 2 Episode 1: Levi Bellfield ==
- Air date: 14 March 2013

Levi Bellfield was found guilty of killing 13-year-old Milly Dowler in 2002, having already been convicted of the murders of Amelie Delagrange and Marsha McDonnell and attempted murder of Kate Sheedy.

== Series 2 Episode 2: Stephen Griffiths: The Crossbow Cannibal ==
- Air date: 21 March 2013

Stephen Griffiths the self-dubbed Crossbow Cannibal, who killed and dismembered three women between 2009 and 2010 - and ate parts of their bodies. Wilson asks when Griffiths' killing cycle began and whether he is responsible for more deaths than those already known about.

== Series 2 Episode 3: Robert Napper ==
- Air date: 28 March 2013

Professor David Wilson investigates the crimes of multiple killer and serial rapist Robert Napper and looks at other unsolved attacks that he may have been responsible for.

== Series 2 Episode 4: Anthony Hardy: The Camden Ripper ==
- Air date: 4 April 2013

Professor David Wilson investigates the crimes of Anthony Hardy dubbed The Camden Ripper. He explores possible connections between the killer and a number of unsolved murders and looks into the story of Sally White, whose corpse was found in Hardy's bed, but whose death was attributed to natural causes by the pathologist.
