= Fred the Head =

Unidentified person found in England, 1971

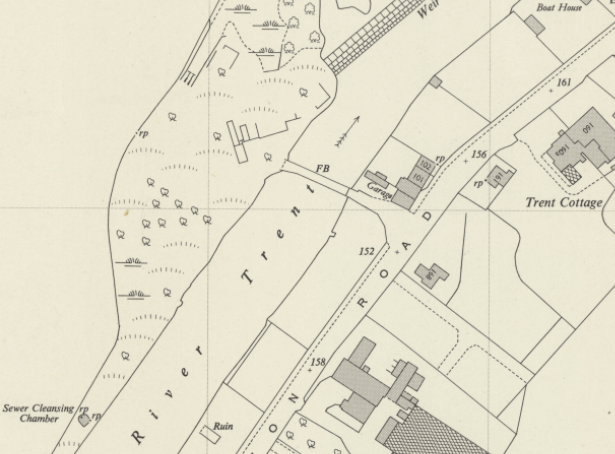
The body was discovered at the site of the former flint mill at the west end of the footbridge, shown here on a 1952 Ordnance Survey map.

Fred the Head is the popular name of an unidentified young white adult male found – deceased, naked, and bound – on the site of an abandoned flint mill in Burton upon Trent, England, in 1971. A number of investigations have failed to identify the body and it is now the oldest unsolved missing persons case in Staffordshire.

== Discovery of body ==
The body was discovered at 7:30 pm on 26 March 1971 by David Nathan. Nathan was a special constable and employee of Messrs Time Consortium, a jewellers. He was off duty at the time of the discovery which was made while he was walking to an area behind his workplace to carry out some shooting practice. The site lay on an island on the River Trent accessible only by a footbridge off Newton Road, barred by a locked gate, or via a long, narrow and unpaved track from Burton Bridge. Nathan had accessed the site through the locked gate which was considered secure enough for the police to rule it out as a potential route used by any suspect.

Nathan discovered a fragment of a human skull after he tripped over what he assumed was a bag of cement but was a mound of earth covering a grave. This lay around 100 to 150 yards (91–137 m) from Newton Road on the site of a former flint mill which had been abandoned in the early 19th century.

Police were called and discovered the body of a man in a four-foot-deep (1.2 m) grave. He had been buried in a kneeling position with his hands and feet tied, which led the police to suspect murder. They estimated that the body was that of a white man aged between 23 and 39 and around 5 feet 8 inches (1.73 m) tall, who had died 12 to 18 months prior. The man had been of thin build and had well-looked-after hands with short fingernails. He was naked apart from a pair of pinkish-beige socks with mustard-coloured heels and toes. He wore a woman's nine-carat gold wedding ring on a finger of his right hand.

== Investigations ==
Despite a three-year investigation Staffordshire Police were unable to identify the man who became known as "Fred the Head" as the skull was the first part of the body to be unearthed. They were able to identify that the socks found on the body had been purchased from a stall in the Burton marketplace. It was also found that the ring had been manufactured between 1967 and 1968 by Henry Showell in the Jewellery Quarter of Birmingham and was one of 5,000 made in that style. "Fred" had extensive dentistry work carried out in the six months before his death and was found with a partial upper denture. He was also found to have suffered from torticollis which would have caused his head to lean to his right in life.

The case remains listed on the National Crime Agency's Missing Persons Bureau website and is the oldest unsolved missing persons case in Staffordshire. Developments in the case have been made in the decades since the body was found. "Fred" became one of the first unidentified bodies to have an E-FIT composite image made to show what he might have looked like in life. Fingerprints were taken at the time of discovery but have yet to show a match. In 2006 the case featured on the BBC's Crimewatch programme for the first time. In 2014 the skull was subjected to tests and scans by a team from the University of Derby; they concluded that it was as likely to be of Hungarian or Danish origin as British. The wearing of a wedding ring on the right hand is also more common in some European countries including Norway, Denmark, Austria, Poland, Bulgaria, Russia, Portugal, Spain and Belgium, than it is in Britain where it is traditionally worn on the left hand. Staffordshire Police became only the second British force to use familial DNA profiling in an attempt to identify the body. At one time it was linked to Michael Edge, a milkman from Watford who disappeared around the time the body was buried.

Following another Crimewatch feature on 27 June 2017 that included a facial reconstruction of "Fred", the family of John Henry Jones raised his case as a potential candidate. Jones had gone missing from North Wales in 1970 and police established a possible link based on dental records. DNA testing subsequently proved that the body was not that of Jones. In 2021, police investigated whether the body might be a victim of the serial killer Anthony Hardy who was born in nearby Winshill and would have been 20 at the time of its discovery.

The case was the subject of a 2008 book Fred the Head: And Other Unsolved Crimes by Michael Posner who interviewed police officers involved with the case. A podcast series on the killing began around the 50th anniversary of the discovery.

== See also ==
- Unidentified decedent
