= Philip Smith (criminal) =

Spree killer jailed for life in 2001 for the murders of three women

- Police mugshot of Philip Smith
- Born: Philip John Smith; 10 July 1965 (age 61); Gloucester, England
- Occupations: Fairground worker, odd-jobber, taxi driver
- Children: 3
- Status: In custody
- Conviction: Murder
- Penalty: Life imprisonment
- Time at large: 8 November 2000 to 12 November 2000

Philip John Smith (born 10 July 1965) is an English spree killer serving a life sentence for the murders of three women in Birmingham in November 2000. A former fairground worker employed at the Rainbow pub in Digbeth, Smith killed his victims over a four-day period. All three victims were mutilated almost beyond recognition, but Smith was quickly identified as the killer on the strength of overwhelming evidence.

Smith's first victim was Jodie Hyde, a recovering butane gas addict whom he met at the Rainbow before killing her hours later. He is thought to have strangled her before setting her body on fire near a recreation ground. Three days later, he met mother-of-three Rosemary Corcoran at the same public house and drove her to a rural location, where he bludgeoned her to death and drove over the body. Then, as he drove home, he hit care worker Carol Jordan with his car and, fearing capture, beat her to death. All three bodies were discovered soon after the murders were carried out.

Smith was apprehended after he contacted West Midlands Police saying that he wished to make a statement about Corcoran's disappearance. At the time, however, her body had not been positively identified, and inquiries quickly established that some aspects of his account were false. The murder inquiry, named Operation Green, uncovered a large quantity of strong evidence incriminating Smith, but at first he denied responsibility. He maintained his innocence as his trial began in July 2001, but later in the proceedings changed his plea to guilty and was sentenced to life imprisonment. The motive for his crimes was unclear, but police who arrested him believed that a "lack of permanent sexual relations" was a contributing factor.

Detectives also investigated the death of a woman who had been a colleague of Smith at the Rainbow. Patricia Lynott, a divorced mother of two from Ireland who had moved to Birmingham, had been found dead in her flat in October 2000. Police had not treated the death as suspicious, but after they discovered her connection to Smith, her body was exhumed for a second post mortem. This proved to be inconclusive, and in January 2003 a coroner's jury in Birmingham recorded an open verdict after hearing that the cause of her death could not be determined.

== Background ==
Philip John Smith was born at the City Maternity Hospital in Gloucester, Gloucestershire, on 10 July 1965. He was the oldest of five children to sawmill labourer Henry John Smith and his wife, Rose Smith (née Luckins).

Smith's family initially lived in Midland Road, where they were neighbours of serial killers Fred and Rose West, before moving to Hailes Road on the Coney Hill council estate in 1971. The family's financial situation deteriorated when Smith's father was injured in a motoring accident. Smith attended Coney Hill Infants and Junior School before being transferred to a special school for children with learning difficulties. He left school at age 14 to join his father's new employer, Billy Danter's Funfair, which toured extensively throughout the UK. He worked out of season as a farmhand, labourer and security guard.

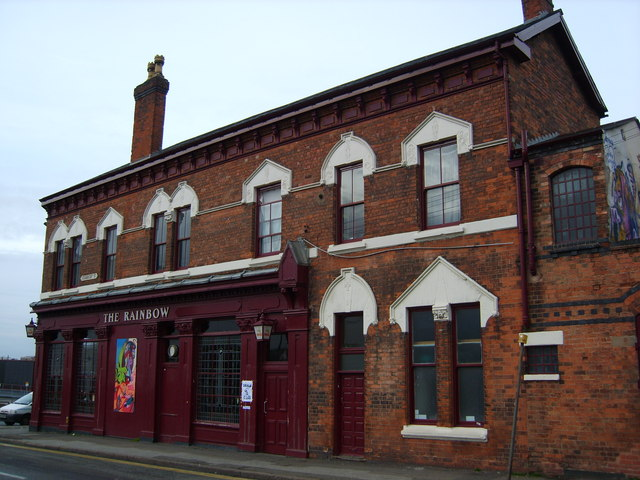
The Rainbow Pub, Digbeth in 2006. Smith worked here as an odd-jobber and unofficial taxi driver. It is also where he met two of his victims.

As a young adult, Smith moved to Tewkesbury and then Ross-on-Wye, where he lived with a female partner. They had three children between 1990 and 1992, but Smith left the family and moved to Cardiff when the relationship became difficult. He then spent a year in Ireland lodging with a travelling family who took pity on him while he was hitchhiking in County Westmeath. They allowed him to live rent-free in a spare caravan, while he contributed a portion of his unemployment benefit towards food. However, they asked Smith to leave when they became uncomfortable about sexual remarks he had made to young women in the family.

Smith moved to Birmingham towards the end of 1999 and stayed briefly at the Trinity Centre, a hostel for the homeless in Digbeth, before moving to a property managed by a housing association in Braithwaite Road in Sparkbrook. He became well known locally and was a regular patron of local businesses such as the Shamrock Cafe on Stratford Road and of the Rainbow pub in Digbeth, where he was employed on a casual basis as an odd-jobber and served as an unofficial taxi driver for drinkers.

Smith received over thirty criminal convictions for minor offences, beginning in May 1984 when he was fined £100 for theft. His record also included handling stolen goods, burglary and driving without a licence, but no violence. At 6 ft 4 in and weighing 22 stone, with a dishevelled appearance and a soft West Country accent, Smith was considered gentle by those he met. In an interview with the Birmingham Evening Mail following Smith's trial in July 2001, Jim Smith, proprietor of the Shamrock Cafe, said, "He was a gentle giant who we named 'Bigfoot' because his boots always used to leave black marks on the floor. Ninety-nine per cent of the time he had a dirty appearance and looked like he had been working on a car."

== Murder spree ==
On 8 November 2000, Smith met 21-year-old Jodie Hyde, a recovering butane gas addict from Alum Rock, at the Rainbow pub, and they were seen leaving together. He took her to a hospital appointment and later killed her. Prosecutors believed that he strangled her at his flat and dumped her body near a recreation ground near Golden Hillock Road in Sparkbrook, where he set it alight. The still-smouldering remains were discovered at 6:15 am next morning (9 November) by two patrolling police officers. The body was barely recognisable and had to be identified using fingerprints. A subsequent post mortem concluded that she had been strangled before being rolled up in a carpet and set on fire.

Three days later, Smith met Rosemary Corcoran, a 25-year-old mother of three from Castle Vale at the same pub, and again they were seen leaving together. They were seen to enter a club together and spend time in the bar. It was seen on CCTV later that she appeared very drunk and he had dragged her into his vehicle. He drove her to Worcestershire before bludgeoning her to death and running over her body near Droitwich Spa. Her face was unrecognisable and the attack was extremely brutal. She was found at 8:30 am on 12 November by a man walking his dog in a lane near Junction 5 of the M5 motorway. Smith's third victim was Carol Jordan, a 39-year-old care home worker and mother of six from Balsall Heath, who was killed as she walked to work. Smith hit her from behind with his car while driving back from Worcestershire, fracturing her hip. Fearing that he would be caught, Smith moved her to another location and beat her so much that dental records were required to identify her corpse. The body was discovered at 8:50 am on 12 November on parkland next to Bell Barn Road, Lee Bank.

== Investigation ==
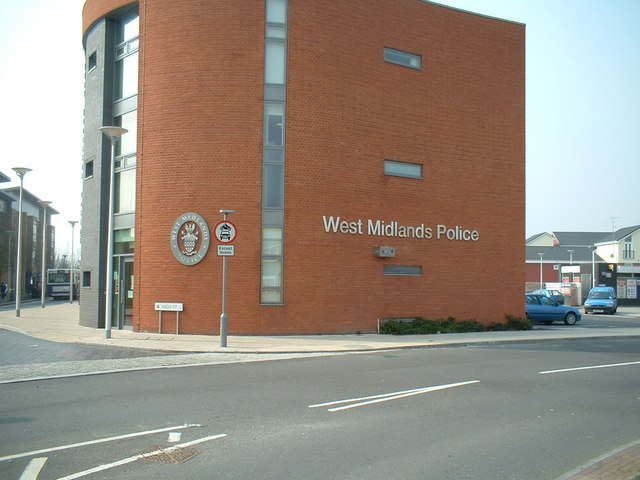
Smith contacted Castle Vale Police Station saying he wished to make a statement about Rosemary Corcoran's disappearance.

=== Initial statement ===
When staff at the Rainbow pub told Smith of Corcoran's disappearance on 13 November, he telephoned the police station at Castle Vale saying that he wished to give a statement. Significantly, his call came at 4:00 pm, before the body found in Worcestershire had been positively identified as Corcoran's, and within an hour Smith had presented himself at Castle Vale. Detective Constable Ruth Wilkins later recalled Smith's phone call: "He said he would like to come to the police station to help with the inquiry and that he had seen [Corcoran] on Saturday night leave the pub with an unknown man. He insisted he would like to come over to the police station. He said he had been asked to contact the police by someone else and gave his mobile number."

In his subsequent statement Smith admitted to being at the Rainbow with Corcoran and a male friend, but claimed they were later separated when they went to another pub, the Kerryman, and the male friend was ejected. Smith said that he and Corcoran then went to Monte Carlo's, a nightclub in Handsworth, and that when they left some time later, Corcoran was confronted by a man he described as a Teddy Boy, with whom she had argued at the Kerryman. Smith said that the man became aggressive, so he asked Corcoran if she wanted to go home. Claiming that she told him she did not, he said he then left her.

=== Evidence and murder charge ===
The murder investigation, named Operation Green, was led by Sir Edward Crewe, Chief Constable of West Midlands Police, and included 100 police officers and 50 support staff from the West Midlands and West Mercia forces. Detectives viewed hundreds of hours of CCTV footage, gathered more than 100 separate exhibits and interviewed witnesses. Evidence was analysed by scientists from the Forensic Science Service (FSS) in Birmingham. Martin Whittaker, the scientist who headed the FSS team, spoke of the huge volume of evidence: "The team pulled together every strand of forensic evidence to create a kind of 'spider's web' and in the centre of it all ... was Philip Smith. In 20 years of working for the FSS, I have never had to deal with so much evidence in relation to one suspect. It was quite overwhelming."

Although Smith maintained his innocence, detectives quickly gathered evidence linking him to Corcoran's death and those of the other two women. Witnesses had seen him leaving the Rainbow with both Corcoran and Hyde, and he was the last person to see them both alive. CCTV footage from around Birmingham showed his distinctive car visiting key locations linked to the investigation, and even captured Hyde getting out at one point to visit a chemist. Smith was seen buying petrol from a filling station and driving near the area where Hyde's body was later discovered. Corcoran was seen on camera struggling with Smith outside Monte Carlo's. CCTV footage showed him driving around Bromsgrove, a town close to Droitwich, after killing Corcoran, and later footage showed him returning to Birmingham. At least two witnesses recalled seeing Smith with blood on him: a motorist who saw him buying petrol, and another who spoke with Smith about his appearance. Smith told the latter that he had been in a fight, although he had no visible signs of injury.

In addition to the witnesses and CCTV footage, there was substantial forensic evidence linking Smith to the murders. Investigators found over a dozen bloodstains on his car, on his clothing and in his flat, all matching the victims. There were bloodstains on the boots with which he had kicked both Corcoran and Jordan, which he was still wearing at the time of his arrest. Smith had tried to clean his clothes in the bath of his flat along with a pair of trousers belonging to Corcoran, and a bag containing items belonging to Hyde was discovered outside. Detectives matched the tyre marks from his car, which had four different types of tyre, to the Worcestershire murder scene and to Corcoran's body, over which he had driven. Paintwork and fragments of glass found on Jordan's body matched those from Smith's car, including a broken light cluster which he had thrown into the car's boot.

Smith was charged with Corcoran's murder on 17 November 2000 and remanded in custody the following day. By this time her death had been linked to the killing of Hyde. Police interviewed Smith in connection with the deaths of Hyde and Jordan on 28 November and charged him with their murders two days later. While awaiting trial, Smith was held as a Category A prisoner in the high-security Woodhill Prison in Buckinghamshire.

== Trial and sentence ==
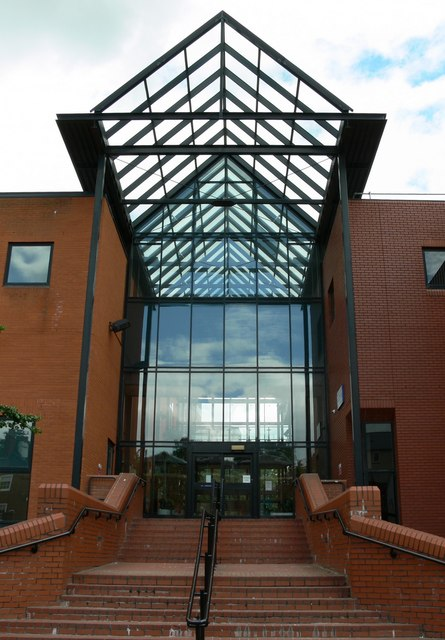
Smith's trial was held at Leicester Crown Court in July 2001.

Smith's trial began at Leicester Crown Court on 3 July 2001, where he pleaded not guilty to the three murder charges. The case was prosecuted by Tim Raggatt, QC, and Smith was defended by Rachel Brand, QC. On the opening day of the trial, Raggatt told the Court there was "powerful and compelling" scientific evidence linking Smith to the killings. Smith's defence was that traces of blood found on his clothes were there because police had tampered with evidence, while the trousers belonging to Rosemary Corcoran found at his flat had been among a bag of clothes Smith had stolen from outside an Oxfam shop.

On 17 July, Smith complained of feeling unwell with chest and eye pain while under cross-examination, and proceedings were briefly halted while he was treated for the symptoms of a panic attack. When Smith returned to the witness stand, he said he wished to speak to his barrister. Presiding judge Rafferty told him that he must answer questions, to which Smith replied: "I want to change my plea. I'm fed up with this. I want to change my plea." The charges were read to him again the following day, and he pleaded guilty. On 18 July 2001 Smith was sentenced to life imprisonment. In January 2005, Birmingham's Sunday Mercury newspaper reported that Smith had decided to change his plea after police agreed to return £400 confiscated from him during a raid on his flat after his arrest, and that he wanted the money to buy Mars bars in prison.

Passing sentence, Rafferty said: "You robbed three innocent ladies of their lives. I suspect that their families will suffer the more as they simply don't understand why you did. The brutality of these ladies' deaths, designed by you to evade discovery, showing the coldness with which you dispatched them, is appalling. You should clearly have faced up like a man at the overwhelming nature of the Crown's case against you but you chose to put the victims' families through misery which you compounded by this trial." The motive for Smith's actions remained unclear after the trial, but police believed a "lack of permanent sexual relations" had been a contributing factor.

== Further inquiries ==
As a result of their inquiries into Smith's background, police launched an investigation into the death of a fourth woman who was discovered to have had links to him. Patricia Lynott, a 47-year-old divorced mother of two, had moved to Birmingham from Athlone during the mid-1990s. On 23 October 2000, while she was employed at the Rainbow pub as a cleaner and to look after the licensee's children, she was found dead in the bedroom of her flat on Maxstoke Street, Bordesley Green. Police believed at first that she had died of natural causes. A post mortem failed to establish a cause of death, and her body was returned to Ireland for burial.

Because Lynott had worked alongside Smith at the Rainbow, West Midlands Police wished to re-examine the cause of her death. In early 2001, investigators asked the Irish authorities for a new post mortem, and on 8 March Lynott's body was exhumed by Gardai from a cemetery in Athlone and taken to the city morgue in Dublin for further examination by Ireland's State Pathologist, Dr John Harbison. However, the results of this autopsy also proved inconclusive.

An inquest into Lynott's death was held at Birmingham Coroner's Court in January 2003. The hearing was told that marks found on her back and an arm may have been bruising, but the pathologist who conducted the original post mortem could not be sure how she had died, because her body had lain undiscovered for up to seven days. It was also said that, despite her connection with Smith, police and four pathologists had failed to establish that Lynott had been murdered. The coroner's jury returned an open verdict.

Police also conducted a routine re-examination of other unsolved murder cases dating back 20 years in areas where Smith had lived. Officers from West Midlands Police held a conference in October 2001 with representatives from several other forces, including West Mercia and Gloucestershire, to share information about unsolved murder cases in their areas. Detectives interviewed Smith three times, but he refused to answer their questions, and no further charges were brought.

== See also ==
- David Smith, British killer convicted of the 1999 murder of a sex worker
