= Gary Allen case =

British convicted murderer (born 1973)

Gary Arthur Allen (born 27 September 1973) is a British convicted murderer serving life imprisonment for the murders of Samantha Class and Alena Grlakova, two sex workers who he killed 21 years apart, in 1997 and 2018. Allen first stood trial for Class's murder in February 2000, but was acquitted by a jury at Sheffield Crown Court. He then went on to assault two sex workers in Plymouth within days of his acquittal, and would later confess to murdering Class during an undercover police operation staged in 2010. It was not until a change in the law regarding the rules of double jeopardy in England and Wales, whereby a defendant could not stand trial twice for the same crime, together with other cases involving the double jeopardy rule, and after he committed the second murder in 2018 that Allen was brought to justice. Following a seven week trial in 2021, also held at Sheffield Crown Court, he was convicted of both murders, and sentenced to life imprisonment with a minimum term of 37 years. He will become eligible for parole in June 2057.

== Background ==
Gary Arthur Allen was born on 27 September 1973, and raised in Kingston upon Hull. At the age of eight, he was referred to a child psychiatrist for aggressive behaviour towards his younger siblings. He would also be prone to violent tantrums, and attempted on several occasions to start fires. Between January 1982 and July 1983 he spent two terms at Baynard House, a residential home in Hull, where social workers noted a "split personality" where he could be well behaved one minute, and become violent the next. At the age of 14, he attacked his mother with a clothes prop while she was in bed recovering from surgery, while on another occasion he attacked a schoolgirl, grabbing her by the throat and hitting her on the head as he attempted to push her to the ground. Allen spent time in care as a teenager, and at the age of 15 attempted to strangle the 15-year-old son of his foster carer.

After joining the British Armed Forces, Allen was stationed in Germany, where, aged 19, he was reprimanded for attempting to steal an advertising flag and for causing criminal damage. His violent temper continued, and on one occasion he threw a television through a window at the camp because Sonia's "Better the Devil You Know" did not win that year's Eurovision Song Contest. Two years later he threatened a housemate with a diver's knife, then later told a friend how he had smashed the fingers of a man who had damaged his car. On another occasion he attacked a man with a baseball bat.

In July 2012, and because of his attacks against sex workers, as well as for standing trial for the murder of Samantha Class, Allen's name was added to the National Ugly Mugs (NUM) list, a Home Office-funded online database of people who are considered to pose a danger to those working in the sex industry.

== Murder of Samantha Class ==
Samantha Class was a 29-year-old mother-of-three from Kingston upon Hull, who had been placed in care as a young girl, and who had become involved in sex work as a teenager. A former social worker at the children's home at which she was a resident described her as mature for her age, but said she would disappear for days or weeks at a time before being returned to the home by police, having once been discovered in London. Class was a drug user, and earning money as a sex worker at the time of her death. After disappearing on 25 October 1997, her body was discovered on the banks of the River Humber near North Ferriby by a group of schoolgirls the following day; she had been strangled, badly beaten and run over by a car.

Allen was charged with Class's murder after his fingerprints and DNA were obtained during the routine investigation of an unrelated drink driving offence and discovered to be a match. Police stopped his car in Hull in July 1998, and following the investigation he was charged with her murder in October. The original year-long inquiry by Humberside Police involved the questioning of 6,806 people, with 3,500 statements eventually taken by officers, while the DNA screening of 2,000 people was also carried out. Humberside Police described the investigation as "a truly meticulous investigation that left no stone unturned". The investigation, led by Detective Chief Superintendent Ken Bates, also involved an appeal for information on BBC One's Crimewatch and the offer of a £5,000 reward.

During police interviews, Allen admitted to having sex with Class on the night she disappeared, but denied murdering her. Investigators discovered he had sold his vehicle for scrap the following day, something Allen claimed he had done fearing he would be linked to the murder after it was reported in the media, but reports on the day he sold the vehicle made no reference to Class or a murder investigation. He stood trial for the murder at Sheffield Crown Court in February 2000, but despite the evidence presented against him, was acquitted and walked free. The acquittal came as a surprise to all of those involved in the case, which had been expected to return a guilty verdict. Humberside Police said at the time they would not reopen the investigation and were not looking for anyone else in connection with the case.

== Plymouth attacks ==
Allen moved to Plymouth, Devon, following his release. Lisa Welton, a former crime reporter for the Hull Daily Mail, has described how he was dropped at Sheffield railway station with some money and told to "get as far away from Yorkshire as possible". Thirty-five days after his acquittal, he assaulted two sex workers in Plymouth, and was apprehended after one of his victims fought back and a nearby police officer heard her cries for help. Following a subsequent trial at Plymouth Crown Court, Allen was sentenced to five and a half years imprisonment after being convicted of assault causing actual bodily harm and indecent assault in December 2000. In 2002, he spoke to a probation officer and confessed to harbouring a hatred of sex workers, and described fantasies in which he wanted to hurt them: "I like to frighten them... I like to cause pain... I like to make them cry... I like blood... I like to hurt them I enjoy it... It makes me feel good".

Allen was released on parole in 2003, but recalled to prison several months later for breaching the conditions of his parole, one of which included not being allowed to drink alcohol. He was recalled to prison again in 2004 after removing an electronic tag while out on licence and going on the run. These offences led to extra time being added to his original sentence, and he eventually served ten years in prison. He was finally released in 2010, and settled in the Grimsby area. Upon his release he was subject to a Sexual Offences Prevention Order that prohibited him from approaching sex workers. In 2011, he attempted to sue the Grimsby Telegraph to stop the newspaper publishing his whereabouts and following the establishment of a Facebook campaign titled "Keep Gary Allen Out Of Grimsby" that contained threats to his safety. But the case was dismissed by Mr Justice Coulson following a hearing at Leeds Crown Court. He subsequently moved from Grimsby to Scunthorpe.

== Operation Misty, and double jeopardy law ==
When Allen returned to Humberside, police feared he may strike again, and launched an operation to assess his potential risk to sex workers in the area. Operation Misty involved seven undercover officers and was designed to facilitate a potential confession by placing Allen in a situation where he might discuss the crime. He was befriended by a police officer using the name "Ian" and posing as an experienced criminal who was on the run from others. "Ian" told Allen that he wanted to eliminate an enemy in the Netherlands. Allen volunteered to help, having said that "violence and all that ain't a problem". He told "Ian" he had committed house burglaries, had assaulted a police officer, and on 6 December 2010, admitted to killing Samantha Class. In the recorded conversation he outlined the circumstances leading up to the crime, describing how she had become angry and demanded money from him after the condom they were using had split during sexual intercourse. Allen told the officer Class had said "I want your name and I want your address, your money and everything else, I'm going to tell the police you raped me". Allen then went on to say "So I killed her and I dumped her in the Humber". He discussed the case again with "Ian" on 16 February 2011 after a story about the Samantha Class murder appeared in a local newspaper.

Following the December 2010 conversation, Allen was taken on a series of jobs with "Ian", and another undercover officer, "Scott". On one occasion Allen waited in a car while "Ian" punched another undercover officer, while it was also suggested that Allen should burn a set of "Ian's" bloodstained clothes after "Ian" told him he had been involved in a fight in the Netherlands. Allen subsequently did as requested, then provided "Ian" with evidence by taking a picture using an iPhone, which was later destroyed. Undercover officers eventually gathered over 400 hours of recordings, but Operation Misty was discontinued in 2011 after Allen attacked a sex worker in Scunthorpe. In June 2011, he was sent back to prison for breaching the Sexual Offences Prevention Order, and for the assault of a police officer. He settled in the Rotherham area of South Yorkshire following his release several months later.

The Criminal Justice Act 2003 had changed the law regarding double jeopardy, whereby a defendant could not stand trial twice for the same crime, and from 2005, allowed a second trial to take place if there was new and compelling evidence to link them to the crime that had not been available at the time of the original trial. Since the changes, it had only been used on rare occasions, most notably in the case of Gary Dobson who, in 2012, was one of two people convicted of the 1993 murder of Stephen Lawrence, Dobson having previously faced trial and been cleared of that crime. In 2017 it was also used in the successful conviction of Russell Bishop, who had previously stood trial for the 1986 Babes in the Wood murders. In the case of Allen, there was no new forensic evidence against him and, despite his confession, the law was unclear on what other than forensic evidence constituted new evidence. It was not until he killed again that a conviction for the 1997 murder was secured.

== Murder of Alena Grlakova ==
Alena Grlakova, a 38-year-old mother-of-four, had come to the UK from Slovakia in 2008, where she had settled in the Rotherham area. She had become a sex worker following the breakup of her marriage at the end of 2013, and after forming a same-sex relationship with a woman she had befriended. She had started using drugs, but had spoken to her former husband of wanting to turn her life around. At the time of her disappearance she had been making plans to return to her family in Slovakia. She was last seen alive on Boxing Day 2018, and reported missing on 15 January 2019. Her body was discovered on 8 April 2019 in the city's Parkgate area. She had been strangled, and her naked body dumped in a stream near Taylors Lane, known as the Old Slaugh. A post mortem subsequently established strangulation as the cause of death.

South Yorkshire Police initially launched a missing person investigation, which was headed by DCI Mark Oughton. Allen was arrested in January 2019 for breaching a Sexual Offences Prevention Order, which prohibited him from having contact with sex workers. Analysis of telephone records showed Allen had been in contact with Grlakova, while investigators subsequently uncovered recordings of Allen threatening to harm Grlakova, along with CCTV evidence placing them together; a ball of wet wipes, described as being the size of a football, was also recovered from the local drains after they became blocked, suggesting that Allen had used them to clean something. Police considered arresting Allen for what is termed a "bodiless homicide", where murder is suspected but there is no body, and began the process of gathering enough circumstantial evidence to link him to the case. The case became a murder investigation following the discovery of Grlakova's body, and the subsequent investigation involved 232 officers, who interviewed 800 witnesses, becoming their largest murder investigation for several years. Due to the similar circumstances of both the Grlakova and Class cases, i.e. that they were sex workers who had been murdered, South Yorkshire Police worked with Humberside Police to gather evidence. Allen was charged with Alena Grlakova's murder in October 2019, and appeared before Sheffield Magistrates' Court on 9 October.

== Overturning of acquittal, and 2021 trial ==
The evidence against Allen was presented to the Court of Appeal in 2019, with Max Hill QC, the Director of Public Prosecutions for England and Wales, taking personal responsibility for presenting the case and arguing for the original acquittal to be quashed. In addition to evidence relating to the Samantha Class murder, the court was also told about the Alena Grlakova murder. Several pieces of evidence were presented; the two similar attacks Allen had committed in Plymouth, Allen's admission that he fantasised about committing physical and sexual violence towards women while in prison, Allen's 2010 and 2011 confession to killing Samantha Class, his threats to harm Grlakova, and footage found on a mobile phone in Allen's possession that contained images of dead women. The Court overturned Allen's 2000 acquittal, allowing him to be tried again for the murder committed in 1997. At the time it was believed to be the first case in the UK involving both double jeopardy and a double murder.

Allen's seven-week trial began at Sheffield Crown Court in April 2021. The case was prosecuted by Alistair MacDonald QC, with James Gelsthorpe acting as junior counsel, and defended by Katherine Goddard QC. The trial was presided over by Judge Mr Justice Goose.

The trial heard that Allen had met Samantha Class on 25 October 1997, and paid her £30 for sex. The court was told her body was discovered in the River Humber the following day. A pathology report ascertained she had been stamped on, strangled with a ligature and run over by a car before being dragged to the river. Semen found inside her matched Allen's DNA, while traces of her blood were found at the scene. Testimony from Allen's flatmate at his previous trial was read out, describing how he had taken his clothes to a laundrette the day after Class disappeared. The court was also told that following his acquittal for that crime, and subsequent conviction for the Plymouth assaults, Allen had told probation officers of his "hatred" for prostitutes, whom he described as "scum". One of his victims from the Plymouth attacks also gave evidence to the trial. Evidence was also presented from the Humberside Police operation during which Allen had confessed to the murder while speaking to an undercover officer using the name Ian.

The court was told that Allen first met Grlakova at a bus stop in October 2018, while on his way to work, and saw her on a number of occasions after that. She began calling at his flat uninvited, and on Boxing Day 2018 had visited the property twice. Recordings Allen had made of their conversation were played to the court, in which he had angrily told her to go away, and said he would "beat the living shit" out of her if she called again. After killing her, the trial was told Allen had used the internet to search for trowels and shovels, and downloaded Google Earth in order to look for a suitable location to dispose of the body. GPS was then used to ascertain that he had visited his chosen location the following day, before taking the body to the Old Slaugh site overnight on 28 December, where he covered it with gravel. The trial also heard that a broken mobile phone was found during a police search of Allen's flat, which following analysis, was found to contain a number of images of dead women in similar circumstances to those in which Grlakova had been discovered. Allen had also used the phone to search the internet for terms such as "ways to commit perfect murder" and "murdered female", but the court was told these could not be dated.

Allen admitted to having sexual intercourse with Class on the night of her disappearance, claiming she was the second sex worker he had engaged that evening, and that he had not previously visited a red-light district before that night. He said that he had spent much of the evening drinking at the Holderness pub before picking her up in his car, and claimed the pair agreed on a price for sex before driving to Walker Street, where they engaged in sexual activity. He then claimed that Class had got out of his car angry because the condom they were using had split and after he refused her request to drop her off, but that she walked away and that he had not seen her again. He did not come forward initially because he said he felt ashamed for using a sex worker. Asked about the sale of his car, Allen said he had sold it in order to pay his flatmate money he owed for a telephone bill. Asked if his reason for selling the car was because of the murder, Allen told the court that it was not. He also denied taking his clothes to the laundrette the following day. On the conversations with the undercover officer, Allen claimed to have fabricated them because he knew he was being "set up", telling the court "I was just talking out of my backside. I just told them what they wanted to hear". Asked about Alena Grlakova, Allen told the court he had met her in October 2018, but had not known she was a sex worker. He said that they had engaged in sex once, but that he did not want her at his flat because he suspected her of stealing two mobile phones from the property. He told the trial he had ordered her to leave, but had not been violent towards her: "I didn't dislike Alena. She was a pain... and I wanted her out." He claimed to have been "shocked" to learn of her death, and that his internet searches for trowels and shovels were because he was considering taking on an allotment.

== Conviction, sentence, and appeal ==
On 15 June 2021, the jury were sent out to consider their verdict. On 17 June, Allen was convicted of both murders after the jury reached a unanimous guilty verdict. Welcoming the conviction, Claire Lindley, Chief Crown Prosecutor of CPS Yorkshire and Humberside, said: "From the evidence presented to the court, it is clear that Allen is a dangerous individual who presents an obvious and immediate danger to women." But Niki Adams, of the English Collective of Prostitutes, suggested the Grlakova murder could have been prevented: "This does feel like an avoidable tragedy yet again other women have gone on to lose their lives because the violence of a particular man was not addressed properly at the time and that is a pattern that we have seen over and over again."

On 23 June, presiding Judge, Mr Justice Goose sentenced Allen to life imprisonment, with a minimum term of 37 years. Allen appeared via videolink from HM Prison Wakefield to hear the sentence. In his summing up, Goose described Allen as "an extremely dangerous man, with a long-held, deep-seated and warped view of women, particularly of sex workers". He went on to say "It would not be an overstatement to say that what you did to those two women, and the loss and suffering to their families, was wicked". With time already spent in prison taken into account on the day of his sentence, Allen will become eligible for parole on 14 June 2057.

Allen appealed against the convictions, claiming the trial judge had "misdirected" the jury to dismiss three defence witnesses who claimed to have seen Grlakova after Boxing Day 2018 as "unreliable and not credible". His defence barrister also claimed there was no evidence to suggests the killings had been planned in advance. But following a hearing at the Court of Appeal on 28 April 2022, the appeal was dismissed. Lord Justice Holroyde, sitting with Mrs Justice McGowan and Mr Justice Choudhury, said they did not accept the arguments, adding the trial judge had given "a faithful summary of the evidence of the witnesses and mentioned briefly the need to be cautious about identifying evidence".

Allen's conviction raised the question of whether he may be responsible for other murders. During their investigation, South Yorkshire Police liaised with the National Crime Agency to track Allen's movements around the country. Following his conviction, the South Yorkshire force announced they would be contacting other police forces around the UK to ask them to revisit unsolved murder cases.

== See also ==
- Murder of Jacqueline Montgomery, 1970s murder case where a conviction was secured through the double jeopardy law
- David Smith, British murderer of sex workers, convicted of a second murder six years after he was acquitted of the first
