= Alun Kyte =

English criminal (born 1964)

- Born: 7 July 1964 (age 62); Tittensor, Stoke-on-Trent, England
- Other name: Midlands Ripper
- Occupation: Lorry driver
- Motive: Hatred of women
- Convictions: 2 counts of murder, 1 count of rape, 2 counts of buggery, 4 counts of indecency with a child, 3 counts of attempting to choke, 2 counts of indecent assault, 2 counts of deception, 3 counts of theft, 1 count of making off without payment, 1 count of failing to surrender to bail, other convictions for petty offences
- Penalty: Life imprisonment (25-year minimum tariff)

Details
- Victims: 2+
- Span of crimes: Late 1980s – December 1997
- Country: England
- Date apprehended: December 1997 (for rape), March 1998 (for murders), February 2023 (for further historical sexual offences)
- Imprisoned at: HM Prison Onley (as of May 2023, previously HM Prison Rye Hill)

Alun Kyte (born 7 July 1964), known as the Midlands Ripper, is an English double murderer, serial rapist, child rapist, paedophile and suspected serial killer. He was convicted in 2000 of the murders of two sex workers, 20-year-old Samo Paull and 30-year-old Tracey Turner, whom he killed in December 1993 and March 1994 respectively. After his conviction, investigators announced their suspicions that Kyte could have been behind a number of other unsolved murders of sex workers across Britain in the 1980s and 1990s. He was apprehended due to the ground-breaking investigations of a wider police inquiry named Operation Enigma, which was launched in 1996 in response to the murders of Paull, Turner and of a large number of other sex workers. Kyte was sentenced to a minimum of 25 years imprisonment for the murders of Paull and Turner.

Operation Enigma, which reviewed the unsolved murders of more than 200 sex workers and vulnerable women across Britain since 1986, continues to influence police investigations today and was described as the first step towards the creation of a violent-crime database in Britain.

In February 2023, Kyte was further convicted of historical sexual offences against a 9-year-old boy, which he committed in a violent campaign of rape, indecency, and threats which began in the late 1980s and continued for five years. Kyte is imprisoned at HM Prison Onley as of May 2023 and continues to refuse to accept his guilt for any serious crime of which he has been convicted, except for one murder which was verified with a DNA link to him and which he eventually 'accepted his culpability' in.

== Early life ==
Kyte was born in Tittensor, Stoke-on-Trent in 1964. He grew up in Stafford. Kyte was said to be a sickly youngster who suffered from severe asthma, and his family doted on him constantly. After leaving school, he worked in a series of odd jobs and eventually became a lorry driver. He was described as a loner and was said to have a violent hatred of women and an unusual interest in prostitutes. He was rarely seen with women and often lived in hostels or bed and breakfasts. He would regularly travel hundreds of miles across Britain, telling acquaintances he was looking for work. He was known at several hospitals and surgeries, as he would seek medication for a number of medical complaints as he drove lorries around the country.

== Criminal activity in the 1990s ==
Kyte's itinerant lifestyle allowed him to travel the country in order to seek prostitutes, his chosen victims. He would in particular frequent motorway service stations. He would ask for services from prostitutes, then attack and rob them. He was also a prolific conman, involving himself in petty fraud in cheating car owners by claiming he'd 're-tuned' their cars when he had not. He would frequently replace his own personal car, while also using the cars belonging to his customers to trawl the motorways for women. He would occasionally drive as many as 1,000 miles in these cars, then return them to the unwitting customers.

In January 1991, the Staffordshire Newsletter reported that Kyte had been convicted of stealing more than £700 from his father's bank account to feed his gambling addiction. Kyte, then of Rickerscote Avenue in Stafford, went on the run once his father had discovered the theft, and was reported as a missing person prior to being apprehended by police. During this time, Kyte was also convicted of deceiving a couple, whose car had broken down, out of £35 claiming he was going to buy them a spare part, and also for driving off without paying for petrol at a garage. He pleaded guilty to two counts of deception, one count of theft and one count of making off without payment and was also found guilty of failing to surrender to bail. He was given two years' probation. His defence claimed that, following an examination by a psychiatrist, the clinician had "found nothing clinically wrong with him". Kyte claimed to have remorse, and stated, "I have given up gambling and enrolled at an addiction control centre".

=== Murder of Samo Paull ===
In December 1993, Kyte picked up 20-year-old sex worker Samo Paull from Birmingham's Balsall Heath red light district. She was a single parent. She was reported missing on 4 December and was missing for more than three weeks before her partially-clothed body was noticed by a horse rider on 31 December. Paull's remains were lying in a water-filled ditch near a lay-by outside of Swinford, Leicestershire. This was 38 miles from where she was last seen in Birmingham. The site was near junction 20 of the M1 motorway. Because of the remoteness of the location, there was no CCTV evidence, nor were there any people living nearby who could provide information. All of Paull's possessions had been stolen. Detectives originally focused their investigation on Paull's boyfriend.

A key witness was a woman who had seen a man in a brown-coloured Ford Sierra car driving through Swinford in early December with a woman in the back seat who appeared to be dead. The witness had previously worked as a pathologist, and had experience in examining dead bodies. The woman was sitting "bolt upright" and had strange marks on her face. The car was covered in mud and the driver appeared to not want to be seen, pulling a hat over his face. When Paull was found dead on 31 December, the witness insisted to police that the dead woman she had seen being driven around was Paull.

=== Murder of Tracey Turner ===
On 2 March 1994, Central Television broadcast a reconstruction of Paull's murder. Kyte saw the broadcast, and it fuelled his desire to attack another victim. Shortly after the broadcast, he abducted 30-year-old Tracey Turner from Hilton Park Services on the M6 Motorway. Turner regularly solicited customers from motorway service stations across the country. Turner had a disability: she was virtually deaf. She was found dead the next day at Bitteswell, near Lutterworth, 52 miles from where she was last seen. Similarly to Paull, she had been dumped near the M1 motorway, this time near to junction 19. She had been raped, stripped of her clothing and strangled. She was dumped by the side of the road and was found about six miles from where Paull had been found dead. Police concluded that she had been transported to the location by car and dumped at the side of the road by the killer. Initially, the police made no connection between this new discovery and the murder of Samo Paull three months earlier. The first suspect to be questioned was a man who was believed to have been seen speaking to Turner at Hilton Park services. His car's registration was checked; he was traced to Glasgow, but, after speaking with him, investigators found no evidence to link him to the murder, and he was released.

Two days after the murder, Kyte was seen at the service station posing as a newspaper reporter. He told staff he was conducting an investigation into prostitution.

Initial inquiries into the murders of Paull and Turner yielded few clues, and Kyte was not apprehended during this period.

=== Further events of 1994 ===
It is known that Kyte also attacked a second woman in 1994. That March, he again picked up a sex worker from the Balsall Heath area of Birmingham and drove to a dark area, before pulling out a Stanley knife and holding it to her neck. He ordered her to give him her belongings and remove her clothes, but, when she begged for her life and told him that she was three months pregnant, Kyte told her to get out, throwing her clothes after her. The victim reported the attack to the police; Kyte was not apprehended for this offence.

On 22 April 1994, it was reported in the Staffordshire Sentinel that a man had been charged with kidnapping Kyte from his Stafford home and robbing him of £55. At this stage, it was still not known that Kyte had murdered and attacked several victims.

=== 1995 theft convictions ===
In January 1995 Kyte, still not known to have committed the murders and attacks on women, pleaded guilty at a magistrates' court to two counts of theft, having stolen a vehicle he said he was working on for a client, and also stealing an £800 welding equipment set, after lying and claiming he had already given the equipment back to its rightful owners. At this time, Kyte, recorded as being of Plant Crescent, Stafford, was also charged with a number of other petty offences.

=== 1997 attack and imprisonment ===
In December 1997, Kyte committed a violent attack and rape of a woman at knife-point in Weston-super-Mare. The victim had been staying in the same hostel as Kyte, and was attacked by him there at night. She managed to escape and report the incident to the police. Police were dispatched to the hostel, where they arrested Kyte. Kyte was ultimately found guilty of the attack at trial and sentenced to 8 years' imprisonment.

== Murder investigations ==
=== Operation Enigma ===
At the time, police in Britain were often ineffective at solving the murders of prostitutes. The victims received markedly less sympathy from detectives, their murders were rarely featured prominently in the media, and they were often blamed for making themselves vulnerable. In the six months after Paull's death, four other sex workers, including Tracey Turner, were murdered across Britain, and Leicestershire Constabulary detectives asked for a cross-force investigation. Kyte's crimes were committed in several jurisdictions, which caused difficulties in conducting investigations and sharing resources. The increasing number of unexplained prostitute deaths in the 1990s eventually led to the creation in 1996 of Operation Enigma, which was intended to review the unsolved murders of up to 207 women dating back to 1986 which were committed against sex workers or women who "could have been mistaken for sex workers". The operation was run by the National Crime Faculty in Hampshire, and made use of tracking and data analysis techniques from Canada as well as new forensic techniques which detectives hoped would upgrade crime scene samples. Enigma was one of the first steps towards a database for violent crime analysis, and many of its features influence present-day police investigations.

Detectives concluded that many murders of sex workers in the 1990s appeared to have been committed by the same person and investigated the theory that a serial killer or serial killers could be at large. 14 murders were in particular said to have similarities and Enigma concluded that up to four serial killers could be at large. Many of the unsolved murders Enigma investigated were clustered in the Midlands and in Merseyside. Information was shared between police forces around Britain. Detectives concluded that the similar murders of Paull and Turner were likely linked.

=== Arrest and conviction for murders ===
When Kyte was arrested in December 1997 for the attack on the woman in Weston-super-Mare, his DNA was taken as part of standard procedure when arresting individuals suspected of a crime. This DNA profile was uploaded onto the national DNA database in March 1998, which revealed a match to a sample taken from the scene of Tracey Turner's murder in 1994. Both Turner's and Paull's murder investigations were then re-opened by Enigma investigators. Kyte was interviewed by these detectives, who decided not to disclose that they had found a DNA link in order to see what his defence would be. He subsequently denied ever using prostitutes. He denied ever having pretended to be a newspaper reporter at Hilton Park Services, but CCTV had captured him doing it. He then revealed that he owned a brown Ford Sierra car, the same type as had been seen by the witness transporting a dead body near to where Samo Paull was found dead. Soon after, Kyte was charged with the murders of both Turner and Paull.

At trial, forensic experts stated that the likelihood of the DNA found on Turner belonging to anyone other than Kyte was "one in 33,000 million" (one in 33 billion). Kyte's fellow prison inmates testified that he had boasted of the murders while imprisoned for his 1997 attack. They stated that he had told them that he killed Turner because she laughed at him during sex, infuriating him. The prosecution asserted that the two murders were linked by "type, origin and disposal". Kyte put in a last-minute defence that the reason his semen was found on Turner was because he regularly used prostitutes (despite his earlier declaration that he had never used them) and had had consensual sex with her, saying: "You meet people and have sex with them or a one-night stand and you don't remember it". He was found guilty of both murders by unanimous decision. He was given a minimum 25-year tariff.

In news media coverage of his offences, Kyte was labelled the "Midlands Ripper", in part because he was also suspected of having multiple other victims.

== Investigations into other possible victims ==
Operation Enigma had investigated Kyte's potential links to some of the other 200+ cold cases it was re-investigating. Because Kyte lived an itinerant lifestyle and drove across the country, it was believed he could be responsible for other unsolved murders across Britain. In prison, Kyte allegedly boasted of killing 12 women in total, which the detective in charge of investigations into his two known murders said "could be true". He is said to have stated to inmates that "you don't pay for that kind of women". There were reports in the media that detectives feared Kyte could have more victims than Peter Sutcliffe. After Kyte's conviction in 2000, Leicestershire Police took the unusual step of issuing every police force in Britain with his details and a tape recording of his voice.

Detectives, in particular, noted that Kyte was not yet known to have committed any attacks between 1994 and 1997, and stated that they suspected that there could have been other unknown victims between these dates. There were several murders that took place when Kyte was known to have been in the vicinity, and it was revealed after Kyte's 2000 conviction that detectives were already planning to speak to him about such murders. Many were committed near motorways, or the victim's bodies were found near motorways, similarly to Paull and Turner. The murder victims announced by investigators as possible victims of Kyte were:

- Yvonne Coley, Birmingham, May 1984.
- Gail Whitehouse, Wolverhampton, October 1990.
- Janine Downes, Wolverhampton, February 1991. Kyte was working in the area at the time.
- Lynne Trenholme, Chester, June 1991.
- Barbara Finn, Coventry, October 1992.
- Natalie Pearman, Norwich, November 1992.
- Carol Clark, Gloucester, March 1993. Kyte was living in Weston-super-Mare at the time, 20 miles from her flat in Bristol.
- Dawn Shields, Sheffield, May 1994. Kyte had recently moved to a residence near the place she was abducted from and the murder was said to have all the hallmarks of a Kyte killing.
- Sharon Harper, Grantham, July 1994.
- Julie Finlay, Liverpool, August 1994. Kyte was said to have detailed knowledge of the area where she was found.
- Tracey Wylde, Glasgow, November 1997.

A link between Kyte and these murders could not be proven at the time, as there had been no DNA evidence acquired in these cases. However, Enigma detectives believed that Kyte was responsible for other murders. Leicestershire Police assistant chief constable David Colman stated: "I do not believe that we have uncovered the full extent of his criminality and, in particular, there is every reason to believe he may have been responsible for other serious attacks on women". Operation Enigma concluded that there were notable similarities between the murders of Whitehouse, Trenholme, Pearman, Clarke and Shields. Some of the suggested links between Kyte and these murders were later disproven: In 2017, Norfolk Police revealed they had DNA evidence in the Natalie Pearman case, and in 2019 another man was convicted of Wylde's murder. Kyte was originally also linked to the murder of Celine Figard in 1995, but another man was later convicted of the killing. Investigators already have fingerprint evidence in the Trenholme case. In April 2023 a 66-year-old man was arrested and then bailed in the Carol Clark case, following the discovery of "new and significant" information by police.

The murder of Dawn Shields was covered in a 2013 documentary, as part of the Killers Behind Bars: The Untold Story series. The presenter David Wilson spoke to detectives who were on the Shields case; they also visited the site where she was found.

Kyte continues to be regularly linked in the press to many of these murders and other unsolved killings.

== Imprisonment ==
Kyte had an appeal against his conviction rejected in February 2001.

In 2013, it was announced that Kyte had failed in an appeal against the length of his 25-year minimum sentence. Kyte had argued that the sentence was "too long". It was revealed that Kyte had accepted his culpability in relation to Turner's murder but continued to deny any involvement in the murder of Paull. The judge said that he had not made enough progress in prison to qualify for a reduction in his sentence. Because his appeal was rejected, prior to his 2023 conviction, Kyte was due remain in prison until at least 2025.

== 2023 further convictions ==
In February 2023, Kyte was further found guilty of sexually abusing an underage boy in the years leading up to his two known murders. Kyte began to target the boy in the late 1980s and continued to regularly attack him for 5 years, luring the 9-year-old boy to his house and attacking him after promising him toys. It was heard that each attack saw increased violence and threats against him and his family if they told anyone and that Kyte would punch, choke, kick and taunt the boy. Kyte also raped the child on at least two occasions. After the victim felt finally able to come forward and testify, Kyte was found guilty in 2023 of four counts of indecency with a child, three counts of attempting to choke, two of indecent assault, and two of buggery. Kyte accepted he was capable of extreme violence but denied everything, with his justification being that the victim "has got no reason to make these allegations". During cross-examination Kyte similarly refused to accept that he had killed Samo Paull but admitted murdering Tracey Turner on the grounds that she had "pestered" him to finish a meal in a motorway service station.

It was revealed during the 2023 trial that Kyte was now imprisoned at HM Prison Rye Hill. Kyte's 2023 convictions were widely publicised, and also led to further speculation on the possibility of him having claimed more murder victims.

On 11 May 2023, Kyte was given a third life sentence, and additionally ordered to serve a minimum of ten years and eight months' imprisonment, meaning he will ultimately not be eligible for parole until late 2033. By this point, Kyte had been moved to HM Prison Onley.

== In popular culture ==
=== Books ===
- In 2001, criminal profiler Paul Britton, who worked with detectives on the case, released a book titled Picking up the Pieces which included a section on the case.
- In 2007, author Nigel Cawthorne published a book titled The Mammoth Book of Killers at Large which featured a chapter on Operation Enigma.
- In 2009, author Vanessa Howard published a book which featured a chapter noting possible links between Kyte and the murder of Birmingham sex worker Janine Downes in 1991. The book was titled Britain's Ten Most Wanted: The Truth Behind the Most Shocking Unsolved Murders.
- In 2012, author Stephen Wade included a chapter on Kyte in his book DNA Crime Investigations: Solving Murder and Serious Crime Through DNA and Modern Forensics.

=== Television ===
- In 2013, Channel 5 broadcast a documentary with high-profile criminologist David Wilson which covered the murder of Dawn Shields, one of Kyte's suspected victims. The episode was part of the Killers Behind Bars: The Untold Story series and was focused on possible links between unsolved crimes and Stephen Griffiths (although Wilson concluded links to Griffiths were unlikely). Wilson spoke to investigators who were on the Shields case and visited the site where she was found.
- In 2019, Quest released a documentary on Kyte titled Alun Kyte: The Midlands Ripper. It was released as part of the British Police: Our Toughest Cases series and was the fifth episode of series 1. It featured interviews with detectives who investigated Kyte.
- In 2020, retired detective Jackie Malton released a documentary on Kyte on CBS Reality as part of her The Real Prime Suspect series. The episode was the fourth episode of series two and was titled "A Serial Killer in the Making?".

== See also ==
- David Smith, another killer of sex workers in the 1990s investigated by Enigma; he is also suspected of having murdered more victims
- Murders of Jacqueline Ansell-Lamb and Barbara Mayo, unsolved murders committed on British motorways by a similarly transient killer
- Operation Anagram, a similarly named cross-force police investigation into the activities of transient British serial killer Peter Tobin
- Murder of Lindsay Rimer, an unsolved 1994 murder also re-investigated by Operation Enigma
- Murder of Julie Pacey, another 'Enigma'-investigated case

Other UK cold cases for which the offender's DNA is known:

- Murder of Deborah Linsley
- Murders of Eve Stratford and Lynne Weedon
- Murder of Lisa Hession
- Murder of Lyn Bryant
- Murder of Janet Brown
- Murder of Sheila Anderson
- Murder of Linda Cook
- Murder of Melanie Hall
- Batman rapist, subject to Britain's longest-running serial rape investigation

== Cited works ==
- Britton, Paul (2001). Picking Up the Pieces. Random House. ISBN 9780552147187.
- Cawthorne, Nigel (2007). "England and Wales – Operation Enigma". The Mammoth Book of Killers at Large. London: Robinson. pp. 467–468. ISBN 978-1-84529-631-5.
- Fido, Martin (2001). To Kill & Kill Again: How Britain's Most Famous Serial Killers were Identified, Caught and Convicted. London: Carlton.
- Howard, Vanessa (2009). "Janine Downes: All Women Count" (Online copy). Britain's Ten Most Wanted: The Truth Behind the Most Shocking Unsolved Murders. London: John Blake. pp. 243–268. ISBN 9781844547593.
- Kinnell, Hilary (2013). Violence and Sex Work in Britain. Routledge. ISBN 9781134024506.
- Wade, Stephen (2012). "Chapter 9: The Midlands Ripper, 1993-2000". DNA Crime Investigations: Solving Murder and Serious Crime Through DNA and modern forensics. Barnsley: Pen & Sword. ISBN 9781844688142.
