= David Wilson (criminologist) =

Scottish criminologist (born 1957)

Professor David Wilson
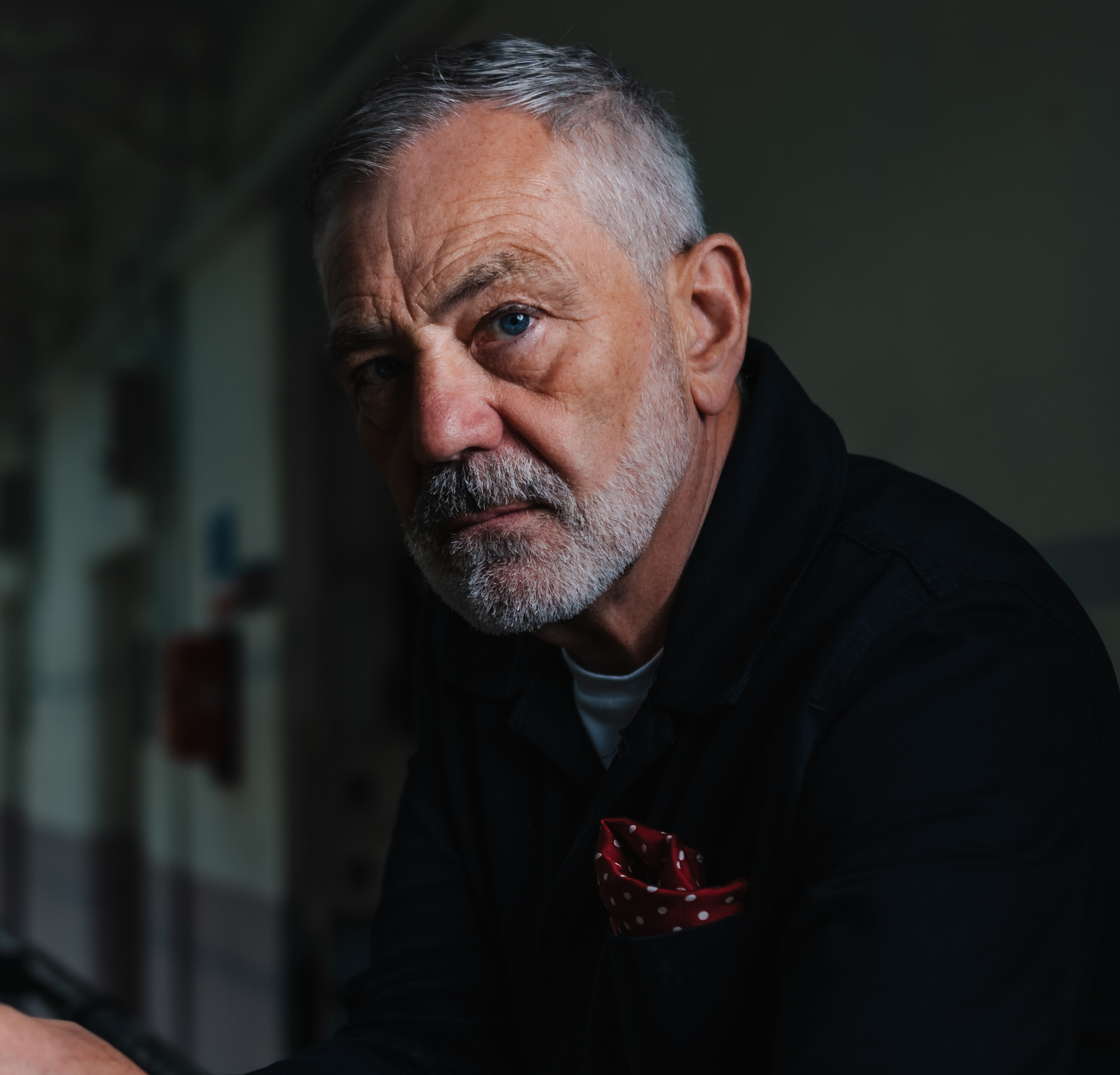
- Wilson in 2023
- Born: 23 April 1957 (age 69); Sauchie, Clackmannanshire, Scotland
- Education: University of Glasgow; Selwyn College, Cambridge; Cambridge Institute of Criminology
- Occupations: Prison Governor (former); University Professor; Criminologist
- Years active: 1984–present
- Employer: Birmingham City University
- Spouse: Anne
- Children: 2
- Website: professorwilson.co.uk

David Wilson (born 23 April 1957) is a Scottish emeritus professor of criminology at Birmingham City University. A former prison governor, he is well known as a criminologist specialising in murder and serial killers through his work with various British police forces, academic publications, books and media appearances.

== Early life ==
Born in Sauchie, Clackmannanshire, David Wilson was raised on a dairy farm outside Carluke, Lanarkshire with his three sisters. He studied at the University of Glasgow (1975–79), Selwyn College, Cambridge, and at the Cambridge Institute of Criminology, where he gained a PhD in 1983. He was awarded the St Andrew's Scholarship of New York, 1979–80. and became a National Teaching Fellow in 2012. He wrote about his childhood experiences and a murder that took place in the town of Carluke in 1973 in his book Signs of Murder (2020 - Sphere).

== Career ==
=== Her Majesty's Prison Service ===
Recruited directly from Cambridge, he joined Her Majesty's Prison Service as an Assistant Governor at HMP Wormwood Scrubs in 1984. It is said by some that at the age of 29 he became the youngest governor in the country. In fact he was the Assistant Governor in charge of Finnamore Wood camp, a small annexe to HM YOI Huntercombe. He then worked at HMP Grendon where he ran the sex offenders' treatment programme, HMP Woodhill, and HMYOI Finnamore Wood.

While at HMP Woodhill, Wilson helped design and managed the two units for the 12 most disruptive prisoners in the country. This experience brought him into contact with some of the most notorious offenders of the last 30 years, including Charles Bronson and Dennis Nilsen.

Later he was Head of Prison Officer and Operational Training in the Prison Service, on whose behalf he made official visits to Northern Ireland and the United States. It was after he returned from a trip to advise on penal reform in Albania on behalf of the Council of Europe, and, noticing how much better the prisons were there, that he resigned from Her Majesty's Prison Service in protest at prison conditions. In 2001 he completed a report on the 4,200 Muslim prisoners in British prisons and his review concluded there were no examples of extremist recruiting.

Wilson has written about these experiences in his memoir, My Life with Murderers.

=== Professor of Criminology ===
Following a short time with the Prison Reform Trust, Wilson joined University of Central England in Birmingham (now Birmingham City University), was given a professorship in 2000 and made emeritus Professor in 2017. A member of the British Society of Criminology, his research covers aspects of prisons and imprisonment, murder and serial murder.

Wilson has advised various police forces as a criminologist, and in 2006 was also involved in the Ipswich serial murder case, as an advisor to Sky News. Subsequently, Steve Wright was arrested and prosecuted for this series of murders. Wilson co-authored a book with the former Sky broadcast journalist Paul Harrison about their experiences on this case. Wilson also approached convicted murderer Peter Tobin to discuss the Bible John killings, but did not secure a meeting with Tobin.

Wilson acted as: Vice-chair of the Howard League for Penal Reform (1998–2014); Vice-president of New Bridge; and Chair of the Forum on Prisoner Education (2000–2006). He is a former Chair of the Commission on English Prisons Today, whose president was Cherie Blair, and is the current Chair of the Friends of Grendon Prison. In 2012, he was made a National Teaching Fellow of England and Wales.

=== Writing ===
Wilson has published widely on the criminal justice system generally and prisons specifically, and was the Editor of the Howard Journal of Criminal Justice (2000–2015), and is the author of more than 20 books.

=== Media ===
External videos
- In the Footsteps of Killers series 2 episode 1

Wilson appears regularly on television and radio, both as a commentator about the criminal justice system and as a presenter. He is a frequent contributor to the press, often writing in The Herald, The Guardian and the Daily Mail. On television, he presented four series of The Crime Squad for BBC1, and also Leave No Trace and Too Young to Die? about the plight of young people on death row in the USA. On BBC2 he presented Who Killed Ivan the Terrible? and was an expert on the game show Identity. On Channel 5 he co-presented Banged Up, which was nominated for a Royal Television Society award. Wilson developed and presented two series of Killers Behind Bars: The Untold Story, which was developed initially from the standpoint of an academic look at criminal profiling to counter that shown in fictional series such as CSI: Crime Scene Investigation.

In 2016, Wilson presented the critically acclaimed Interview with a Murderer on Channel 4, about the murder of Carl Bridgewater. This documentary won the Broadcast Award and the Royal Television Society Award in 2017. By 2023, Wilson had presented 4 series of the true crime show, David Wilson's Crime Files. All series had 10 episodes, with episodes in the first series being an hour long and episodes in the subsequent series being half an hour long. It was broadcast on BBC Scotland. He co-presents Channel 4's In the Footsteps of Killers and is a regular on ITV's This Morning.

Wilson appeared on BBC Radio 4's Ramblings series on 1 October 2020, walking with Clare Balding from Wicken to Leckhampstead whilst discussing his life and the murder of Margaret McLaughlin in Carluke.

On 4 September 2026, This Much Is True Crime, co-presented by Wilson with Martin Frizell looking at and discussing recent crimes, began on True Crime.

Wilson gives public lectures and delivers lectures for schools through the company Ecademi. He has made several theatre tours – most recently in 2024 with the novelist Marcel Theroux. In 2016 the TV drama Dark Angel attributed his book Mary Ann Cotton: Britain's First Female Serial Killer as its inspiration.

== Personal life ==
Wilson is married to Anne, a practising lawyer, and has two children. The family live in Buckinghamshire. Wilson is a fan of rugby union and holds a season ticket at Northampton Saints.

== Publications (books) ==
- Alex Alexandrowicz & David Wilson (1999). The Longest Injustice: The Strange Story of Alex Alexandrowicz. Winchester: Waterside Press. ISBN 978-1-872870-45-8.
- David Wilson & Anne Reuss (2000). Prison(er) Education: Stories of Change and Transformation. Winchester: Waterside Press. ISBN 978-1-872870-90-8.
- David Wilson & John Ashton (2001) What Everyone in Britain Should Know About Crime & Punishment, Oxford University Press. ISBN 1841742694.
- David Wilson, John Ashton & Douglas Sharp (2002) What Everyone in Britain Should Know About the Police, Oxford University Press. ISBN 1841742619.
- David Wilson & Sean O'Sullivan (2004). Images of Incarceration: Representations of Prison in Film and Television Drama. Hook: Waterside Press. ISBN 978-1-904380-08-5.
- David Wilson (2007). Serial Killers: Hunting Britons and Their Victims 1960–2006. Hook: Waterside Press. ISBN 978-1-906534-41-7.
- Paul Harrison & David Wilson (2008). Hunting Evil: Inside the Ipswich Serial Murders. London: Sphere. ISBN 978-0-7515-4024-6. – This co-author is the Sky broadcast journalist and not the former Police Officer of the same name.
- David Wilson & Paul Harrison (2010). The Lost British Serial Killer: Closing the case on Peter Tobin and Bible John. ISBN 978-0-7515-4232-5. – This co-author is the Sky broadcast journalist and not the former Police Officer of the same name.
- David Wilson (2009). A History of British Serial Killing. London: Sphere. ISBN 978-0-7481-1172-5.
- David Wilson (2011). Looking for Laura: Public Criminology and Hot News. Hook: Waterside Press. ISBN 978-1-904380-70-2.
- David Wilson (2012). Mary Ann Cotton: Britain's First Female Serial Killer. Hook: Waterside Press. ISBN 978-1-904380-91-7.
- David Wilson (2014). Pain and Retribution: A Short History of British Prisons, 1066 to the Present. London: Reaktion. ISBN 978-1-78023-283-6.
- David Wilson (2015). Female Serial Killers in Social Context. Bristol: Policy Press. ISBN 978-1-4473-2646-5.
- David Wilson; Elizabeth Yardley & Adam Lynes (2015). Serial Killers and the Phenomenon of Serial Murder: A Student Textbook. Hook: Waterside Press. ISBN 978-1-909976-21-4.
- David, Wilson (2019). My Life with Murderers: Behind Bars with the World's Most Violent Men. Hachette UK. ISBN 978-0-7515-7414-2.
- David Wilson (2020) Signs of Murder: A Small Town in Scotland, a Miscarriage of Justice and the Search for the Truth. Sphere. ISBN 0751578762. About the murder of Margaret McLaughlin in Carluke, Lanarkshire, in 1973.
- David Wilson (2021) A Plot to Kill. Sphere. ISBN 075158214X. About the murder of Peter Farquhar.
- David, Wilson (2023). Murder At Home: How our safest space is where we're most in danger. Hachette UK. ISBN 978-0-7515-8495-0 Hardback Published 23 March 2023
