= David Smith (murderer) =

British murderer (born 1956)

- Born: 1956 (age 69–70); Hampton, Middlesex, England
- Other names: "Lurch", "Honey Monster", "Bigfoot"
- Motive: Rape
- Conviction: Murder (x2)
- Penalty: Life imprisonment

Details
- Victims: At least 2 murder victims, others raped or sexually assaulted
- Country: England
- Imprisoned at: HM Prison High Down (1999), HM Prison Wakefield (between at least 1999 and 2005)

David Smith (born 1956) is an English repeat murderer, rapist and suspected serial killer who came to national prominence in 1999 when he was convicted of murdering a sex worker six years after having been acquitted of an "almost identical" murder. Cleared of the murder of 33-year-old west London sex worker Sarah Crump in 1993, Smith was found guilty in 1999 of the killing of 21-year-old Paddington sex worker Amanda Walker. Smith has since been linked to other murders of sex workers across Britain.

In May 2023, Smith was re-tried for the murder of Sarah Crump under 'double jeopardy' legislation introduced in 2003, and this time was found guilty.

== Background ==
Smith was a lorry driver from Hampton, Middlesex (now part of Greater London). His home was in Markhole Close in Hampton, where he lived with his mother. He had been married, but went back to live with his mother when his marriage failed. He had a string of previous convictions for offences against women, including rape. His record of sex offences dated back to the age of 18, when he raped a young mother at knifepoint in front of her two children. He was convicted of this offence in 1976 and jailed for four years. On his release he became an unlicensed taxi driver, but then attacked another woman who was a passenger after locking the car's doors; she managed to escape by smashing the windscreen. For this he was convicted of unlawful imprisonment and received a suspended sentence. He was later charged with attempting to rape and stab a sex worker in a hotel room, but she refused to give evidence at the trial and the case was dropped.

Smith was also known to frequent woodlands as a voyeur, watching others engaging in sexual acts. Although a convicted rapist, he ran his own escort agency, hiring women out at £250 a time for sexual services and profiting by taking a cut of their earnings.

At 6 ft (1.8 m) tall, 18 st (250 lb; 110 kg) and with size 14 feet, he was nicknamed "Lurch" or "The Honey Monster" by workmates. He was a martial arts expert.

== Murder of Sarah Crump ==
Smith was put on trial in 1993 for the murder of 33-year-old sex worker Sarah Crump, who supplemented her income as a psychiatric nurse by working for an escort agency. She was found dead in her west London home on Lady Margaret Road in Southall in August 1991. She had been stabbed to death and had been "dreadfully mutilated" as she lay dead or dying. It would later be noted that she had been cut with the knife in an almost identical pattern to operation scars borne by a woman Smith had previously been rejected by. The prosecution suggested that Smith murdered Crump after this and a series of other rejections by women. Smith admitted paying Crump for sex on the night she died and said he engaged in sexual foreplay with her but denied being involved in her murder and claimed he left her unharmed. The defence claimed that the detective in charge of the inquiry had suppressed evidence by failing to disclose unidentified fingerprints found on Crump's door handle, a drawer and under her bed, and he was found not guilty by an Old Bailey jury. Crump's mother insisted at the trial that Smith would kill again. At the conclusion of the trial the police said that the case was closed and that they were not looking for anybody else.

Later, in 2003, legislation was introduced under the Criminal Justice Act 2003 which amended the double jeopardy law, meaning suspects could be retried for a crime that they were previously acquitted of if 'new and compelling' evidence became available. This led to the Court of Appeal quashing his acquittal in 2022 and ordering a retrial, and he was found guilty of the murder of Sarah Crump in 2023. As part of the new evidence it was revealed that police had proved that the fingerprints found on the door handle, drawer and under Crump's bed at the time actually belonged to the previous flat owner, disproving Smith's claim at the 1993 trial that these proved someone else had killed Crump.

== Fired as taxi driver, vetting campaign ==
In 1998 Smith, who had returned to working as a taxi driver, was sacked by his employer after they discovered his conviction for raping a woman in 1976. A public campaign was then launched asking for all minicabs in London to be licensed and their drivers properly vetted.

== Murder of Amanda Walker ==
On 25 April 1999 Smith raped, murdered and mutilated 21-year-old sex worker Amanda Walker after picking her up from Sussex Gardens in Paddington in the early hours. Earlier in the night he had attended an "adult" party and he claimed at trial that he left feeling "randy" and was "looking for a bit of fun" and so drove to Paddington red light district. A popular BBC documentary named Paddington Green had previously centred on this red light district. Witnesses spotted Smith picking up Walker near Paddington station. Her blood-soaked clothes were found near Smith's home in an alley in Hanworth, west London later in the day, but Walker was missing and an "aggravated missing person inquiry" was set up by police. Six weeks later her naked body was found many miles away in the gardens of the Royal Horticultural Society in Wisley, Surrey. Her body was so badly decomposed that a pathologist could not be certain of a cause of death, but the mutilation made it clear that it had been as a result of foul play. Reports on the mutilation of the body led the press to compare the murder to a Jack the Ripper killing.

Smith had already been arrested by the time the body was discovered, as police had checked the database of local sex offenders and found that Smith's DNA matched exactly to blood found on Walker's clothing. While in prison he then boasted of murdering and mutilating Walker to his cellmate, who informed police. At his 1999 trial Smith put forward the same defence that he had used in the Crump trial, claiming he that had met up with her and engaged in sexual acts but he left her unharmed and did not murder her. He claimed his blood being found on Walker's clothes was the result of him tripping and hitting his face on the pavement after leaving the party earlier in the night, causing him to bleed on her when he met up with her. The jury did not believe his story and convicted him of the murder. In his final remarks, the trial judge noted that Smith had shown no remorse, stating "you are extremely dangerous to women and clearly will remain so". The lead detective of the inquiry, DCI Norman McKinlay, said that Smith was a "very dangerous man".

=== Public reaction ===
After his conviction, it was widely reported in the media that Smith had already been acquitted of an "almost identical" and "carbon-copy" murder 6 years previously, with the BBC reporting that Smith "beat" the earlier murder charge. At the conclusion of the trial Sarah Crump's mother released a statement saying she was relieved that Smith had finally been jailed, saying "I truly believe Smith to be guilty of the murder of my daughter Sarah. I said at the trial he would kill again". Because of the double jeopardy rules enforced in the UK at the time, Smith could not face trial again for Crump's murder.

== Further police inquiries ==
After his conviction in 1999, police forces across the country examined unsolved murders of sex workers to see if they could have been connected to Smith, and his details were circulated to all UK forces. In 2008, it was reported that police had taken moulds of Smith's unusually large size 14 feet to see if they matched footprints found at crime scenes of unsolved murders. The moulds were in part taken because Smith had become a suspect in the murders of sex workers Linda Donaldson and Maria Requena in 1988 and 1991 respectively. Requena had been found dead in Leigh, Greater Manchester and Donaldson had been found dead less than two miles away only three years earlier, leading to speculation that the murders were linked and both were victims of an "East Lancs Ripper". Donaldson had been killed on the same day a documentary was shown about Jack the Ripper on television, and police believed this could have incited the killer to go out and kill in a copycat incident. A police source said: "Smith was a lorry driver travelling up and down the country. We believe he was a serial killer and are going back in time to bring closure for victims' families". Smith was reportedly questioned about the murders after his conviction for Walker's murder. Links between Smith and the two women's murders were previously investigated by Operation Enigma, a nationwide operation that examined the unsolved murders of over 200 sex workers and vulnerable women in the 1980s and 1990s. The operation had also concluded that links between Requena and Donaldson's murders were likely.

The rules on double jeopardy were changed in Britain in 2005 after the Criminal Justice Act 2003 came into force, meaning that cleared suspects could now be tried again for the same crime if new evidence became available. This led to the investigation into Crump's murder being re-opened with Smith still the prime suspect.

=== 2023 'double jeopardy' Crump conviction ===
In 2021 the Director of Public Prosecutions approved a police attempt to have Smith's acquittal for the murder of Crump quashed at the Court of Appeal so he could be re-tried. The Court of Appeal subsequently quashed the acquittal in 2022, and Smith was retried for Crump's murder at the Inner London Crown Court in 2023. It was revealed that Smith had bragged that he had "got away with it" to an inmate while on remand at HM Prison High Down for the murder of Amanda Walker in 1999, and due to the other law changes under the Criminal Justice Act 2003 allowing bad character evidence the jury were able to hear how Smith had gone on to murder Walker after the acquittal in the Crump case. Smith had been in prison ever since his conviction for the Walker murder when he was tried in 2023. At the end of the trial Smith was found guilty by the jury after less than three hours deliberation. Smith was sentenced to life imprisonment, with a minimum term of 27 years before becoming eligible for parole.

== See also ==
- List of serial killers in the United Kingdom
- Murdered sex workers in the United Kingdom
