= List of unsolved murders in the United Kingdom (2000s) =

This is an incomplete list of unsolved murders in the United Kingdom that were committed between 2000 and 2009. Victims believed to have been killed by the same perpetrator(s) are grouped together below.

== 2000 ==
Year	Victim(s)	Location of body or bodies	Notes
January 2000	Lola Shenkoya	Body not found	Shenkoya, a 27-year-old computing graduate, disappeared from Ealing Broadway on 3 January 2000. Police believe her to have been killed by serial sex offender and suspected serial killer Andrzej Kunowski, who murdered a 12-year-old girl nearby in 1997 and is also the prime suspect in the murder of Elizabeth Chau, who disappeared from almost the exact same location as Shenkoya some months earlier. Kunowski was questioned over both disappearances, but no concrete evidence was found to link either of them to him before he died in prison in 2009.
January 2000	Roger Ormsby	Manchester	35-year-old Ormsby's body was in the driver's seat of the businessman's BMW when it was discovered burning in an alley in Whalley Range on 5 January 2000. He had been shot in the back of his head.
January 2000	Gabriel Egharevba	Manchester	17-year-old Egharevba was shot when he and a friend were being chased by two men on motorcycles whilst riding their bicycles through Longsight on 12 January 2000. Detectives thought it was a case of mistaken identity.
January 2000	Martin Lavelle	Attacked in Willesden, London, died in hospital in Oxford	48-year-old Lavelle, an Irishman living in Willesden, left a bar close to his bedsit in Meyrick Road at nighttime on 4 January 2000 and was assaulted. A friend then saw him lying in that road and took him home, where he was found collapsed two days later by friends who had broken in after he had failed to answer his door. Following his admission to the nearby Central Middlesex Hospital, Lavelle's condition deteriorated enough for him to require an intensive care bed, but the apparent unavailability of such beds in London led to him being moved to a hospital in Oxford on 17 January. Severe head injuries were the cause of the mugging victim's death on 22 January.
January 2000	Lee King	Middlesbrough	King, a 32-year-old petty criminal described as a "likable rogue", was shot dead in Park End on 28 January 2000. A love rival was acquitted of his murder in February 2001. The suspect had also been charged with the murder of Kevin Richardson in the same area of Middlesbrough in 1993, but the charge over that death was dismissed at the magistrates' court level owing to lack of evidence.
February 2000	Bill Malcolm	Manor Park, London	Malcolm, a 46-year-old with convictions for sexual offences against children, was shot in the head on the doorstep of his Manor Park flat in a suspected case of vigilantism on 17 February 2000.
March 2000	Michael Ennis	Liverpool	27-year-old Ennis was struck, fell to the pavement and suffered a fractured skull outside the Anglesea pub on Beresford Road, Liverpool, on 2 March 2000. He died at Aintree University Hospital after being transferred there for neurosurgery, having initially been taken to another hospital in Liverpool, and his death was due to edema and necrosis of the brain. A man stood trial for manslaughter in November and was acquitted.
March 2000	Brian Harris	Brixton, London	25-year-old Harris was shot dead at his home in Brixton on 11 March 2000. The case was probed by Operation Trident, a Metropolitan Police unit dealing with black-on-black crime.
March 2000	Craig Mirfield	Leeds	Mirfield, a 34-year-old car dealer, was shot in his car in Gipton, Leeds, on 15 March 2000 while trying to drive away from a gunman. A man was prosecuted for Mirfield's murder, but his trial ended early due to reservations about the reliability of the two main witnesses.
March 2000	Terry Gibson	Barnet, London	53-year-old Gibson, a landscape gardener with business interests, was shot dead outside his home in Moxon Street, Barnet, on 16 March 2000. Police believed the crime to have been a contract killing.
April 2000	David Dann	Attacked in Blackheath, London, died in hospital	24-year-old Dann was shot from behind just after midnight on 4 April 2000. He and a friend he was with then separated and the offender pursued Dann, who was struck by a total of three bullets before being pronounced dead in hospital at 12:46 a.m.
April 2000	Sarah Benford	Body not found	14-year-old Benford vanished in April 2000 and although her body has never been found, her disappearance is being treated as a murder. Benford was described by police as a "troubled teenager"; she was in care and ran away from Welford House children's home in Welford Road, Northampton on 4 April. She visited her mother in Kettering on 6 April and there were various other sightings of her in Kettering that day. In 2003, a number of people were arrested and properties were searched, but then the investigation stalled. In 2016, police searched woods near Warkton in Northamptonshire – an area known to have been used by acquaintances of Benford for storing stolen goods and other items.
May 2000	Nicola Ray	Body not found	Ray has not been seen since she parted company with a friend in Basildon, Essex, in the early hours of 2 May 2000 following a night out. She was 29 or 30 years old at the time. Ray's fiancé was arrested twice on suspicion of her murder, but neither arrest led to any charges.
May 2000	Frank McPhee	Maryhill, Glasgow	McPhee, a 51-year-old gangster himself twice acquitted of murder, was shot by a sniper in a block of flats opposite his own as he returned home on 10 May 2000.
May 2000	Cheryll Grover	Newbury, Berkshire	Grover, 21, was last seen alive by a visitor to her home on Audley Close, Turnpike, Newbury, at 10:30 p.m. on Friday 12 May 2000. She spoke to a friend on the telephone at 2:35 a.m. on Saturday 13 May, but efforts made by her estranged husband to contact her later that same day came to nothing. Concerned for Grover's welfare, he and his mother visited Grover's home at 3:30 p.m. and he climbed the drainpipe to reach the first floor bedroom window. Inside, Grover was found dead in her bedroom, having been strangled with a dressing gown cord. Police suspected that she had been selling drugs from her home and an appeal led to a number of people coming forward. A 32-year-old man was arrested but released without charge. Although Grover's death was investigated as a murder, the inquest returned an open verdict. In May 2006, Thames Valley Police announced that her death was being reviewed by a cold case team.
May 2000	Clifton Bryan and Dennis Wilson	Leeds	The bodies of 29-year-old Bryan and 32-year-old Wilson were found in a car in Leeds on 15 May 2000. Scientific evidence revealed that they had been shot dead in a house in Manchester before being taken out of the city. In 2001 a man was cleared of the killings, which were thought to have been gang-related.
May 2000	Carl Small	Attacked in Brixton, London, died in hospital	20-year-old Small was stabbed in the heart near Brixton Road's junction with Stockwell Road when two groups of men clashed there early on 8 April 2000. A woman describing herself as a nurse tended to him before an ambulance took him away, but she did not speak to police at the scene and remained an unidentified potential witness. Small died on 25 May.
June 2000	Jaap Bornkamp	Attacked in New Cross, London, died in hospital	52-year-old Bornkamp, a Dutchman who lived in the Norbury area of south London and worked as a florist, was stabbed in an attack believed to have been homophobic while walking along New Cross Road with a male companion in the early hours of 4 June 2000.
June 2000	Shkelquim Brakka	King's Lynn, Norfolk	26-year-old Brakka died on 4 June 2000 from a stab wound received outside a nightclub. A person charged with the Kosovan's murder was cleared at trial.
June 2000	Kellie Pratt	Body not found	Pratt became a sex worker to help pay for a drug habit after moving to Great Yarmouth from her home city of Newcastle in 1998. She was last seen on the phone standing outside a pub in the red-light district of Norwich on 11 June 2000, and soon afterwards told an associate who had phoned her that she was with a client whose identity has not been established. 28-year-old Pratt's disappearance led to a police murder investigation despite the fact that her body has not been found. A link has been suggested to serial East Anglia prostitute killer Steve Wright.
June 2000	Karen Chandler	Salisbury Plain, Wiltshire	A cause of death could not be established for 40-year-old Chandler because her car was set alight with her body inside. Police charged a man in his 60s with her murder. At the trial, the prosecution alleged that he killed Chandler because he was infatuated with her but saw no chance of a relationship developing. The man acknowledged that he was riding his bicycle on Salisbury Plain on the day she disappeared (20 June 2000) but denied any involvement in her death. With the evidence against him being entirely circumstantial, the jury found him not guilty.
June 2000	Menelik Robinson	Clapton, London	20-year-old Robinson was driving along Upper Clapton Road, Clapton, on 25 June 2000 when two motorcycles forced him to stop. A passenger then dismounted and shot him several times.
July 2000	Mark Corley	Near Bolam, County Durham	23-year-old Corley was shot in the head following the last sighting of the Grantham (Lincolnshire) man on 7 July 2000, and his remains were discovered on farmland in County Durham in December. Five men were due to go on trial in early 2002, but a judge called off the hearing after finding that police had unlawfully bugged conversations between those men and their solicitors.
July 2000	Iwona Kaminska	Body not found	Kaminska, a 20-year-old Polish woman, disappeared after leaving her workplace in Hammersmith, London, on 13 July 2000, and investigators came to believe she had been murdered. Two other young women had disappeared from the street in Ealing four miles away over the previous 15 months, and Polish serial sex offender and suspected serial killer Andrzej Kunowski, who died in 2009 and, in 1997, had murdered a 12-year-old girl near where Kaminska was last seen, was to become the prime suspect in those cases.
July 2000	Beatrice Wilson	Poole, Dorset	74-year-old Wilson was knifed to death in her sheltered accommodation on 21 July 2000. A boy who was 15 at the time of the killing was charged with her murder. The prosecution claimed at the trial that followed that he attacked Wilson while burgling the property and later confessed to a friend, but the jury acquitted him.
August 2000	Jonathan Bristow	Sheerness, Kent	39-year-old Bristow was last seen as he left a pub in Chatham, Kent, on 4 August 2000. His body was discovered floating in the River Medway a week later, having separated from weights that had been attached to keep it down. He had been shot in the head. Although Bristow was believed to have had over £20,000 in cash on him and police thought it could have been accumulated through drugs or bootlegging, it was also acknowledged that they had not found any evidence of illegal dealings on his part.
August 2000	Paul Rogers	Liverpool	27-year-old Rogers was shot at his flat near Liverpool Cathedral on 5 August 2000 by an intruder wearing a mask resembling the one in the film Scream. The intruder had an accomplice, and Rogers, shot in front of his nine-year-old son, died the next day. A neighbour had let the culprits in through a communal door after suggesting to them that they rob Rogers because she had had a dispute with him over a bicycle. She was jailed for conspiracy to rob in November 2001, though the judge passing the four-year sentence accepted that she had not been aware that either of the culprits was carrying a gun or planned to kill Rogers.
August 2000	Greg Watson	Attacked in North Kensington, London, died in hospital	21-year-old Watson was knifed in Kensal Road on 28 August 2000 when his female cousin was accosted and he tried to defuse the situation. He died soon after the nighttime stabbing, which Crimewatch later showed low-quality CCTV footage of and which occurred at the time of the Notting Hill Carnival.
August 2000	Ronald Fuller	Attacked in Grays, died in hospital in Basildon (both in Essex)	30-year-old Fuller was shot twice in the head and twice in the chest outside his bungalow on 29 August 2000 by a man who left the scene on a motor scooter.
August 2000	Abdul Bhatti	Attacked in Notting Hill, London, died in hospital	28-year-old Bhatti was punched and kicked at the Notting Hill Carnival at around 7:30 p.m. on 28 August 2000 after intervening when a friend was being assaulted by a mob, and died on the evening of 29 August. Nine men were jailed for taking part in the violence that culminated in the fatal attack, but no one has been convicted of Bhatti's murder.
September 2000	Susan Kelly	Liverpool	38-year-old Kelly was a sex worker in Liverpool when she was murdered on the night of 3–4 September 2000. Her body was found in an alley off Blessington Road, Anfield, and she had suffered a number of violent injuries, including a cut throat, six broken ribs and a broken nose. A man was cleared of Kelly's murder in 2003 and others have since been arrested and released.
September 2000	Clifford Clarke	Uppingham, Rutland	56-year-old Clarke, a former plumber and hospital porter, was stabbed in the chest and neck, and it was noted at his inquest that the attack could have occurred between two and four days prior to his body being found in his flat by his brother on 10 September 2000. Two men were arrested in 2015.
September 2000	Thomas Ramsey	Manchester	16-year-old Ramsey was shot twice – once in the head, once in the neck – in a park in Levenshulme, Manchester, on 19 September 2000. His crime boss was acquitted of his murder but convicted of the murder of a man from another gang. Ramsey had been acquitted himself of the October 1999 murder of Judah Dewar – a murder linked to Ramsey due to the discovery of one of his fingerprints at the scene.
September 2000	Vicky Glass	Danby, North Yorkshire	21-year-old Glass went missing from Middlesbrough town centre on 24 September 2000. Her body was found 20 miles away in a stream on the North York Moors approximately six weeks later. Glass was a sex worker at the time of her death. In 2018, a specialist police team was set up to revisit the murders of Glass, Donna Keogh and Rachel Wilson. A Home Office review of all three cases said: "It is generally accepted that initial enquiries and investigations were inadequate." Cleveland Police believe there could be a link to serial prostitute killer Steve Wright, whose known victims were all found in streams or near water. In September 2021, police announced a re-investigation by a historical crimes unit into Glass's murder. This announcement came two months after Wright's arrest for another historical murder: that of Victoria Hall in 1999.
October 2000	Alan Decabral	Ashford, Kent	40-year-old Decabral was shot dead on 5 October as he sat in the passenger seat of a car in a busy car park. It happened six months after he gave evidence that helped convict Kenneth Noye of a fatal road-rage attack, and the idea that the gunman was acting on Noye's orders was considered. However, it has also been noted by detectives investigating the case that the shooting could have been carried out because of a disagreement with an associate in the criminal world.
October 2000	Raymond Isaacs	Attacked in Hounslow, London, died in hospital	Isaacs, 21, was set upon by about 10 people after leaving a Hounslow café on 16 October 2000. He was punched, kicked, stabbed in the leg, and fatally stabbed in the heart. Some of those people were found guilty of offences relating to the incident, but nobody has been found guilty of Isaacs's killing.
October 2000	Clay Benjamin	Liverpool	24-year-old Benjamin was stabbed in the heart while at a blues party in Toxteth on 21 October 2000. A man in his 30s was cleared of his murder.
October/November 2000	Manokumar Kumar	Edmonton, London	31-year-old Kumar's arm was almost severed in a fatal axe attack at his home on North Road, Edmonton, at some point between 29 October and 1 November 2000. Described as a gangster, he and a man who was to be charged with his murder had been using stolen credit cards to buy things at petrol stations. When that man was on trial, the prosecution advanced the theory that the attack had been committed because the two had fallen out over their fraudulent activities, but the trial was halted and the man had the charges against him dropped.
November 2000	Kenneth Beagle	Romford, London	55-year-old Beagle was from Billericay in Essex and had convictions for drug dealing and kidnapping. He was shot in the head at point-blank range while paying for a parking ticket in the car park of a hospital in Romford at about 10:05 p.m. on 1 November 2000, and was thought to have gone there after taking a telephone call made solely for the purpose of luring him to the spot to kill him.
November 2000	Wade Hewitt	Attacked in Barking, London, died in hospital	26-year-old Hewitt was stabbed in the abdomen when two youths approached him on the upper deck of a bus travelling through Barking in the early hours of 3 November 2000. The youths then alighted and ran off, and Hewitt died the following day.
November 2000	Garfield Nandram	Attacked in Tottenham, London, died in hospital	27-year-old Nandram, a hairdresser from Stamford Hill, was shot once in the face in Croydon House, Tottenham, just before 10 p.m. on 5 November 2000.
November 2000	Steve Jindu	Greenford, London	25-year-old Jindu, a warehouse driver, was found stabbed to death on Horsenden Hill on 14 November 2000. He had last been seen three days previously, when he visited a wine bar in Ealing by himself and went outside to use his mobile phone several times whilst at the establishment.
November 2000	Vincent Clay	Salford, Greater Manchester	Two men shot 27-year-old Clay while he was talking to his girlfriend in Amersham Street, Salford, on 14 November 2000. The victim had been charged with leading a prison riot and acquitted in 1999 of an attempted murder with a samurai sword. A man was put on trial for Clay's murder, it being claimed that he had taken part in the crime in revenge for Clay stealing his car, but the court was informed on the second day of the hearing that the prosecution would not be offering any more evidence.
December 2000	Zoe Parker	Chelsea Harbour, River Thames, London	24-year-old Parker was last seen with two men in Hounslow, west London, on 6 December 2000. She had learning difficulties and no fixed address, staying with friends and at hostels in various places such as London, Colchester and Bournemouth. Parker was known to engage in sex work. Shortly before her death she changed her name to Cathy Dennis. The upper part of Parker's body was discovered in the River Thames on 17 December; her body had been sawn in half before being dumped in the river, and it is not known what happened to the lower half. Police suspect she could have been a victim of Anthony Hardy (the "Camden Ripper"), who dismembered his known victims after killing them in a nearby area between January and December 2002.
December 2000	Anthony Rose-Windon	Clapton, London	25-year-old Rose-Windon was shot after leaving a nightclub on Lower Clapton Road, Clapton, on 16 December 2000, and died after crawling to neighbouring Kenninghall Road.
December 2000	Douglas McPherson	Attacked in Hackney, London, died in hospital	42-year-old McPherson died four days after a Boxing Day attack in which he was battered with a baseball bat in the London Tavern when four men wearing balaclavas entered the Hackney pub. A man who was evicted from there earlier that day for hogging the punch was arraigned on a murder charge for allegedly being one of the assailant's accomplices. Only one witness could place him at the crime scene, however, and his mother – a judo expert – testified that she was holding him down at home at the time of the beating to prevent him from going back out to cause further trouble. The defendant was cleared and claimed that his missing half-brother was involved in the killing.

== 2001 ==
Year	Victim(s)	Location of body or bodies	Notes
January 2001	Andrew Williams	Peckham, London	On 29 January 2001, 30-year-old Williams was killed in Peckham and a friend was seriously injured there in an early hours street shooting preceded by an altercation with a group of other men. The victims had just left a nightclub in the vicinity when the trouble began.
February 2001	Akbal Brar	Attacked in Hayes, London, died in hospital	On 3 February 2001, 21-year-old Brar was in his parked car with a male friend in the passenger seat when a man appeared suddenly on foot and shot him after the passenger had started talking to another unknown man. No motive behind the incident was established.
February 2001	Hussein Obad	Liverpool	19-year-old Obad was shot outside his flat in Upper Warwick Street, Toxteth, Liverpool, on 7 February 2001. Police had arrested him for the August 2000 murder of Paul Rogers, which has also never been solved.
February 2001	Peter Beaumont-Gowling	Newcastle	Beaumont-Gowling was shot dead in a Valentine's Day attack at his flat in Jesmond not long after serving a prison sentence for money laundering. Two suspects caught on CCTV were never identified. A theory developed that the 52-year-old was killed for refusing to compensate people for money not received as a consequence of over £500,000 in drug money being seized when he was arrested.
March 2001	Ian Dowling	Grantham, Lincolnshire	39-year-old Dowling, a road maintenance worker, was shot in the heart and lungs on the doorstep of his home in Grantham on 15 March 2001. In 2003, his lover's husband was imprisoned for conspiracy to murder after standing accused of recruiting contract killers, but in 2005, judges at the Appeal Court found his conviction to be unsafe and quashed it because police had bugged conversations between him and his solicitor.
March 2001	David Williamson	Attacked in North Yorkshire, died in hospital in Leeds	On 26 March 2001, 58-year-old Williamson was found unconscious with a fractured skull a few hundred yards from his home in Sutton-on-the-Forest after he was struck from behind with a blunt instrument following a visit to a pub at nearby Huby. Although a judge deemed a man's murder confession inadmissible, a later threat by that man to kill a garage attendant resulted in him being sent to Rampton Secure Hospital for an indefinite period in 2005.
March 2001	Stuart Lubbock	Roydon, Essex	Lubbock, 31, died during a party at the home of entertainer Michael Barrymore on 31 March 2001. Initially his death was treated as an accidental drowning, but an inquest found he had suffered injuries consistent with sexual assault. In a documentary, Barrymore: The Body in the Pool, shown on Channel 4 on 6 February 2020, Detective Chief Inspector Stephen Jennings of Essex Police stated that mistakes had been made in the original investigation and that he believed Lubbock had been raped and murdered.
April 2001	Rebecca Hall	Bradford, West Yorkshire	19-year-old Hall, a sex worker with a four-month-old son, went missing from her home in Little Horton, Bradford, on 13 April 2001. Her body was found in Thornton Street on 26 April; she had suffered severe head injuries. In January 2019, police arrested a 37-year-old woman and then released her under investigation. Hall's murder has also been linked to Bradford serial killer Stephen Griffiths, who lived 800 metres (875 yd) from where she was found dead. He was interviewed by police about her murder in 2010 but refused to answer any of their questions.
April 2001	Corey Wright and Wayne Henry	Clapton, London	20-year-old Wright was a passenger in 19-year-old Henry's car when shots were fired at the vehicle as it was being driven away from the Chimes nightclub in Clapton on Saturday 21 April 2001, killing both of them. Wright had been convicted along with five other youths of conspiracy to commit grievous bodily harm against Kingsley Iyasara, a 16-year-old boy beaten and fatally shot in the Finsbury Park district of London in 1997.
May 2001	Don Banfield	Body not found	63-year-old Banfield went missing from his home in the northwest London suburb of Harrow on 11 May 2001. In April 2012 his wife and daughter, having earlier pleaded guilty to forgery, conspiracy to defraud and conspiracy to pervert the course of justice, were convicted of his murder after being accused of lying about seeing him in 2008 and being found to have gained financially from his disappearance. However, they were released on appeal in July 2013 – even though a lawyer representing the mother at that hearing acknowledged that the likelihood was that Banfield was murdered by one or other of the women – as they were convicted under joint enterprise and the appeal judges ruled that there was insufficient evidence to prove that they acted together to kill him.
May 2001	Andre Jan Aylward	London	27-year-old Aylward was driving his black E28 5 Series BMW along Valleyfield Road in Streatham at around 2:10 a.m. on 12 May 2001 when six bullets were fired at it from a handgun. After the shooting, he lost control of the car and crashed. He had been hit twice in the head and neck and was taken to King's College Hospital, where he died at around 4:00 a.m. A grey 7 Series BMW had been seen next to Aylward's vehicle a few minutes before he was shot and the police said that they were seeking to identify it. It was thought that the attack might have been a case of road rage or mistaken identity. The police also said that they had found nothing in Aylward's background to suggest that he had been involved in any criminal activity. The murder was featured on Crimewatch in July 2001.
May 2001	Stephen Lawlor	Liverpool	34-year-old Stephen Lawlor was shot dead close to his residence in Netherley, Liverpool, as he left a party on 19 May 2001. Five months later his brother Tony Lawlor was shot dead in this area too. Peter Clarke was convicted of Stephen's murder in December 2001 but found not guilty after being retried at Manchester Crown Court.
May 2001	Richard Rayner	Bow, London	43-year-old Rayner, a plumber from Millwall (east London), was shot at the River Bank Cafe, Bow, on 25 May 2001. A man who initially walked away from the scene then ran towards the A12 and possibly got onto a motorcycle.
26 May 2001	Keith Rogers	Died in hospital in Harlow in Essex from the effects of a fire in Sawbridgeworth, Hertfordshire	40-year-old Rogers managed to escape the fire at his first-floor flat by jumping from a window but died in hospital four weeks later from organ failure caused by smoke inhalation. The fire had been started in the early hours of 29 April by igniting petrol that had been poured through the flat's letterbox.
May 2001	Hasan Mamali and Sami Mustafa	Islington, London	23-year-old Mamali was shot in the back of a car and 26-year-old Mustafa was shot after getting out of it in a bid to escape on 27 May 2001. Police are yet to trace the driver or the front seat passenger, both of whom abandoned the vehicle a short distance away with Mamali still in the back. Mamali and Mustafa were Turkish Cypriots who investigators thought might have been hoping to secure a drug deal.
June 2001	Donovan Williams	Streatham, London	23-year-old Williams was found shot dead at a flat in Barrow Road, Streatham, on 7 June 2001. A man said to have been involved in a gang fight that the shooting was part of – John Dickinson – was found fatally stabbed approximately an hour after that fight, and nobody has been charged with either murder.
June 2001	John Dickinson	Thornton Heath, London	35-year-old Dickinson was found with a fatal stab wound to the leg in the grounds of Mayday University Hospital, Thornton Heath, on 7 June 2001. He was thought to be connected to the death of Donovan Williams, a man murdered earlier on that date.
June 2001	Christopher Hewitt	Bristol	18-year-old Hewitt, a Jamaican who had recently arrived in Britain, was stabbed outside a pub on All Hallows Road, Easton, Bristol, on 10 June 2001 in an incident thought to have involved up to several assailants. Many people witnessed the incident but did not come forward.
June 2001	Colin Beer	Plymouth, Devon	On 9 June 2001, at the junction of Headland Park Road and North Hill in Plymouth, 42-year-old Beer was walking in the path of traffic while under the influence of alcohol when the driver of a blue Peugeot 406 got out and punched him in the face, causing him to fall to the ground and suffer head injuries that would kill him five days later. A man was cleared of manslaughter after a prosecutor noted that the evidence given by the defendant's ex-girlfriend contradicted that of two other witnesses.
June 2001	Jody Burns	Attacked in Runcorn, Cheshire, died at Whiston Hospital	27-year-old Burns sustained a fatal head injury during a disturbance in Runcorn town centre in the early hours of 15 June 2001. The disturbance involved up to 60 people and he was said to have been trying to act as peacemaker. Police charged five men with violent disorder relating to the brawl, but nobody has been charged with Burns's murder.
July 2001	Mithat Lleshi	Northampton	23-year-old Albanian Lleshi and a 28-year-old friend from the same country were set upon by a group of six men and stabbed in Northampton town centre on 7 July 2001. The older victim survived his injuries. It was believed that the group was made up of fellow Albanians and three men were arrested in Albania in 2005, but a Northamptonshire Telegraph article from 2017 has Lleshi's murder as one of the county's still-unsolved crimes.
July 2001	Oguzhin Ozdemir	South Tottenham, London	Ozdemir was kidnapped before being found shot dead next to the River Lea on 14 July 2001. His phone had been used earlier that day to warn friends of his that the 26-year-old, a small-time drug dealer who owed money, would be killed if the people holding him hostage did not receive money or goods. Three men involved in the kidnap were handed sentences of between 10 and 14 years in 2005, but none of the sentences was for murder because it had not been determined who had shot Ozdemir.
July 2001	Daniel Dale	Manchester	18-year-old Dale was killed and another youth hit in the hand when shots were fired at their group as they chatted in the street in Miles Platting on the evening of 25 July 2001. A man was found guilty of murder in April 2002, but advances in forensic science led to the quashing of his conviction in 2014.
July 2001	Richie Clayton	Liverpool	30-year-old Clayton, a father-of-two, was shot in Belgrave Road, Aigburth, Liverpool, just before 8:00 p.m. on 25 July 2001. The gunman and his accomplice had arrived in a green Ford Mondeo which was later found on fire.
August 2001	Alphonso Madden	Manchester	Shots were fired from the pavement at 27-year-old Madden's car as he drove through Longsight, Manchester, on 14 August 2001. The car then crashed into bollards, but the cause of his death was a bullet wound to the chest.
August 2001	Patrick Pasipanodya	Edmonton, London	29-year-old Pasipanodya, an actor who had appeared as an extra in Minder and The Bill, was shot from a motorcycle as he drove along Picketts Lock Lane, Edmonton, on 21 August 2001.
August 2001	Carlton McDonald	Camberwell, London	21-year-old McDonald was stabbed in the early hours of 26 August 2001 after going out and heading to Warner Road, Camberwell, to meet an acquaintance who had phoned him to say he had been attacked and robbed. Youths had been causing trouble in that road and the adjoining Camberwell New Road since around midnight.
September 2001	Yasser Nazir	Bradford, West Yorkshire	16-year-old Nazir was fatally shot in his car by a masked gunman as he drove out of a petrol station in Heaton, Bradford, on 5 September 2001. It was believed that he was killed in revenge for the shooting of a rival gang member.
September 2001	Lindsey Scholes	Died in hospital from the effects of a fire in Royston, South Yorkshire	Scholes, 17, suffered burns and smoke inhalation in a fire started deliberately at a house in Milgate Street, Royston, near Barnsley, in the early hours of 8 September 2001. She was rescued by firefighters but died two days later.
September 2001	Ian Clarke	Liverpool	32-year-old Ian Clarke, a bar doorman, was shot from a passing car when his own car stopped at traffic lights in Tuebrook, Liverpool, on 8 September 2001. The car from which the shots were fired – a Ford Mondeo found burnt out in Redbrook Street, Anfield, sometime later – then did a U-turn and he was shot from it again before dying on 13 September. Because the killing followed his brother Peter Clarke being charged with the May 2001 murder of Stephen Lawlor, a revenge attack for the earlier crime was suspected.
September 2001	"Adam"	River Thames, London	Unknown boy; also known as the "Torso in the Thames" case.
October 2001	John Hall and David McIntosh	Larkhall, South Lanarkshire	The bodies of Hall, 45, and McIntosh, 33, were found at a former scrapyard on 3 October 2001. They were last seen the day before at a greyhound track in the border town of Gretna, and are thought to have been shot dead because they had gangland debts.
October 2001	Dean Eccleston	Manchester	24-year-old Eccleston, a father-of-three, was hit by several bullets in a street in Chorlton-on-Medlock, Manchester, while wearing a bulletproof vest on 8 October 2001.
October 2001	John Marzetti	New Addington, London	45-year-old Marzetti had between five and seven shots fired at him on New Addington's Fieldway estate on 11 October 2001. He was standing next to his car – a BMW parked yards from his home – at the time.
October 2001	Tony Lawlor	Liverpool	45-year-old Tony Lawlor was shot repeatedly in front of his mother in Netherley, Liverpool, on 11 October 2001. His assailant was a masked man who had got out of a transit van that had pulled up outside shops there. The victim was the brother of Stephen Lawlor, a man shot dead five months previously in another killing that remains unsolved.
October 2001	Tyrone Rowe	Attacked in Tottenham, London, died in hospital	18-year-old Rowe was in a car with three friends in Caradon Way during the early hours of 7 October 2001 when a group of men approached the vehicle and 11 bullets were fired into it from handguns. The driver was hit in the chest by one of the bullets, but he survived, while the injury from which Rowe died four days after the attack was a gunshot wound to the head. Rowe was not involved in criminality and might have been shot in a case of mistaken identity.
October 2001	Michael Madden	Port Glasgow, Inverclyde	Madden, a 44-year-old loan shark, was shot dead at the front door of his home on 13 October 2001. The 2003 trial of a man accused of his murder ended with a "not proven" verdict.
October 2001	Brian Metcalfe	Wath upon Dearne, South Yorkshire	43-year-old Metcalfe was found dead under a bridge on Station Road in Wath, near Rotherham, on Sunday 14 October 2001. He had been assaulted and may have died up to two days earlier. Police appealed for anyone who was out in Wath that weekend to come forward.
c. 20 October 2001	Hugh Cameron	River Skeagh, Glenarm, County Antrim, Northern Ireland	36-year-old Cameron's body was found in the river about a month after he had gone missing. He had been beaten and stabbed. It is believed the Ulster Defence Association was behind the murder, but nobody has ever been charged with it.
24 October 2001	Jimmy Millen	Hastings, East Sussex	Millen was a 27-year-old boxer from Taylor Close in Hastings who was shot four times by the passenger of a black motorcycle while working on his car in nearby Tile Barn Road. Both passenger and rider were dressed in black and had blacked-out visors. Following Millen's death, his family revealed his involvement in the murder of Jason Martin-Smith and named those they believed had killed Millen because of it.
30 October 2001	Dwayne Bertrand	Bloomsbury, London	The 21-year-old Holloway resident drove to Bloomsbury and was fatally wounded there by one or more bullets fired at the car he was in.
31 October 2001	George Lynch	Manchester	Lynch was a 36-year-old father-of-six who was fatally shot in the passenger seat of a car being driven along Plymouth Grove in the Longsight area of Manchester. The driver crashed into a tree seconds later but was not badly injured.
1 November 2001	Paul Easton	Grimsby, Lincolnshire	Easton's body was found at an address in Hainton Avenue, Grimsby. He had been held in a headlock for half an hour, bringing about death by suffocation.
5 November 2001	Michaela Hague	Sheffield	Hague was a 25-year-old sex worker. She was stabbed 19 times and then dumped on wasteland at Spitalfields, near Sheffield city centre. Before dying, Hague managed to give a description of her attacker to a police officer. She said the attacker was a white clean-shaven man who had fair hair, drove a blue Ford Sierra with a roof rack and had a wedding ring on.
7 November 2001	Sellathurai Balasingham	Attacked in Mitcham, London, died in hospital	36-year-old Balasingham was dragged from his car and beaten in Pollards Hill at around 11:00 p.m. on 6 November 2001, and pronounced dead shortly after midnight as a result of a fractured skull. Other injuries included bruising and five broken ribs. Several men were charged, one of whom – a man said to have driven a Suzuki Swift away from the scene – agreed ahead of trial to give evidence against the others and plead guilty to conspiracy to assault. In 2004, four of them were convicted of murder and three of conspiracy to assault, but in 2007, their convictions were quashed when the putative Suzuki Swift driver, who disappeared before the 2004 trial and claimed later that threats against him and his family were the reason, was found to lack credibility. At a 2008 retrial, two were convicted of murder and two of manslaughter, but fresh witness evidence in 2011 caused these convictions to be quashed as well. Balasingham was alleged to have insulted an uncle of two of the defendants (who were brothers), and bad feeling stemming from the insult was advanced as a motive for killing him.
16 November 2001	Brian Perry	Bermondsey, London	63-year-old Perry, a taxi firm boss who had helped to launder money from the 1983 Brink's-Mat robbery, died after being hit by three bullets outside his business in Bermondsey at around 1:00 p.m. Two men were charged over his murder and acquitted at their trial in 2006.
16 November 2001	Raymond Scott	Body not found	47-year-old Scott, a self-employed odd-job man from Stanmore in northwest London, disappeared in suspicious circumstances. He drove his white Ford Transit van away from his brother's house in nearby Wealdstone after doing some DIY, and two weeks later the van was found abandoned. On 28 April 2002, one of Scott's brothers received a "menacing" phone call from South Harrow tube station that a detective believed may be significant to the investigation. Footage of the caller at the station featured on Crimewatch in April 2014. Police said Scott had no reason to go missing and his brother has appealed for information on where his body is.
21 November 2001	Brian Hardwick	Colne Road, Huddersfield, West Yorkshire	50-year-old Hardwick was shot in the head and chest with a small-calibre weapon at his place of work, Huddersfield Car Electrical Services, after returning there sometime after 5:30 p.m. to change a flat tyre on his car, but his body was not found until just before 8:00 a.m. the following day. Police said the tyre was punctured deliberately. Hardwick's leather wallet, popper purse, work keys, gold necklace and bank card were taken, and his card was used minutes later to withdraw £350 from a cash machine at Asda in Bradford Road. There have been arrests over this murder but no convictions.
28 November 2001	Rajnikant Pandya	Sutton, London	31-year-old Pandya was shot in his off-licence in Sutton by a man said to have been wearing an animal mask. The culprit entered the shop at around 9:10 p.m., and Pandya took up a piece of wood in an apparent act of self-defence before the shot that killed him was fired. A detective opined that theft might have been the motive despite nothing appearing to be missing.
December 2001	Glenda Chambers	Died in hospital from the effects of a fire in Walworth, London	70-year-old Chambers died a week after a fire at her Olney Road maisonette. Police charged a taxi driver who had fallen out with her family because of his conduct with two daughters he had been in relationships with over a four-year period, but there was no forensic evidence or witness testimonies against him and he was ultimately found not guilty.
December 2001	Donald Marlow Harriot	Clapton, London	28-year-old Harriot was found beaten to death with a heavy blunt instrument at an address in Powerscroft Road, Clapton, in the early hours of 30 December 2001.

== 2002 ==
Year	Victim(s)	Location of body or bodies	Notes
January 2002	Michael French	London	French was stabbed with a concealed knife at a New Year's Eve party in a flat in Clapham, damaging an artery in his chest, following an alleged theft of money. Emergency services were called and an air ambulance took him to King's College Hospital, where he was pronounced dead after dawn on 1 January. A man was charged with French's murder, but he claimed that he left the party to get drugs before the attack and was acquitted at the end of his trial.
January 2002	Abdulkalaq Hussain Ali	Attacked in Shepherd's Bush, London, died the following day	Ali was stabbed on 8 January 2002 outside a house where he and others had met for a party, and a man was acquitted. The prosecution had claimed that he had attacked the victim for starting a rumour alleging that members of the defendant's tribe had raped men at a party in his native Somalia because no women had turned up to it.
January 2002	Jacqueline Nyeko	Kennington, London	24-year-old Nyeko's body was found in a storage area of a block of flats in Kennington on 13 January 2002. She had died of head injuries, and detectives tracing the Brixton woman's final movements found the last sighting of her to have been in St John's Crescent at about 10:00 p.m. on 10 January.
January 2002	Vera Cooper	Grimethorpe, South Yorkshire	80-year-old Cooper was found deceased at her bungalow in Greenbank Walk, Grimethorpe, on 24 January 2002. Her death was officially regarded as non-suspicious until a second post mortem took place after her family reported that items were missing from there, and the second examination revealed that she was strangled.
January 2002	Lyndon Nowell	Body not found	Nowell is thought to have come to harm as a result of his association with a criminal group. A 28-year-old Liverpool resident at the time, he was last seen on the evening of 24 January 2002, when he visited a pub on the city's Childwall Valley Road. Nowell's car was discovered burnt out the next day in Swinton, Greater Manchester.
January 2002	Darren Carley	Charnock Richard, Lancashire	24-year-old Carley went missing after leaving his mother's home in Swindon, Wiltshire, on 24 January 2002, and his skeletal remains were discovered near the Lancashire town of Chorley six months later. He had suffered blunt force trauma to his head.
January 2002	Brynmor Lindop	Goodmayes, London	54-year-old Lindop was shot as he got out of his car outside his home in Goodmayes on 26 January 2002. He was said to have supplied guns to the underworld and to have been a police informer.
February 2002	Brian Francis	Oxford	51-year-old Francis was found beaten to death at his flat in Blackbird Leys on 7 February 2002. Drug users paid frequent visits to the property. Police had a phone box removed from Merlin Road so it could be analysed by forensic scientists, as it was believed that a 999 call about the incident was made from there.
February 2002	Delroy Barnes	Battersea, London	26-year-old Barnes was murdered on the A3220 road in London on 7 February 2002 when a car pulled up next to the one he was a passenger in and a man in the other vehicle fired shots at him from a submachine gun. His body was then dumped outside Battersea police station. The driver of the vehicle in which Barnes died was thought to have been the intended target.
March 2002	Exmoor Body in the Bag	Winsford Hill, Winsford, Somerset	The man's badly decomposed corpse was found wrapped in bin bags, a single green bed sheet and a single duvet on 13 March 2002. Also present were a white pillowcase and a stereo wire, which a detective said the victim might have been tied up with. He is thought to have died two to three years before being found, and it is not clear if the body was brought into the UK from overseas. Clay and computer-generated reconstructions of the man's head were shown on Crimewatch in May 2002 in the hope that someone would get in touch to say they recognised him, but without success. He was 26 to 36 years old and possibly of Turkish or Indian origin, and a gold chain he was wearing when discovered had a pendant with a verse from the Koran inscribed across it. A funeral for the mystery victim was arranged in 2006.
March 2002	Evan Jones	Bristol	46-year-old Jones, a father-of-two, was punched, kicked and attacked with a chain in busy Stokes Croft – a street in Bristol – at about 11:00 p.m. on 13 March 2002. He died at the Bristol Royal Infirmary. The weapon was not found, but was thought to have been a bicycle chain or a large dog chain.
March 2002	Edward Donnelly	Body not found	53-year-old Donnelly disappeared from his home in Sacriston, County Durham, on 25 March 2002, and there has been no proof of life since. Durham Constabulary lists his case as an unsolved murder.
March 2002	Michelle Bettles	Near Dereham, Norfolk	A Norwich sex worker and mother of three small children, none of whom were in her care, 22-year-old Bettles disappeared from the city's red-light area on 28 March 2002. Her fully clothed body was found three days later on Podmore Lane at Scarning. A man was arrested in April 2003 because DNA testing had revealed that his samples matched ones taken from Bettles after she had been strangled to death, but although he admitted having picked her up for sex two days before she disappeared, he was later released due to insufficient evidence. In 2012 David Wilson, a criminologist, suggested that serial prostitute killer Steve Wright was likely to have been the culprit, but police said they had found no evidence to link Wright to the crime.
April 2002	Aeon Shirley	Manchester	A member of a rival gang shot 18-year-old Shirley four times on 11 April 2002, piercing his heart with one of the bullets. Officers investigating the incident in Longsight, Manchester, found that witnesses to it were reluctant to assist them.
April 2002	Les Bate	Near Wadebridge, Cornwall	71-year-old Bate, a millionaire, farmer and widower, was found dead in the utility room of his home in the Cornish countryside on 14 April 2002. He had been beaten in an attack that triggered a cardiac episode, and his wallet was stolen and has never been found. Bate had last been seen on 12 April at the pub in the nearby village of Chapel Amble. His home had been targeted in a burglary seven months earlier, when thieves stole £47,000 in property and cash from his safe.
April 2002	Jade Alleyne	Attacked in Wood Green, London, died in hospital	20-year-old Alleyne died the day after police found him shot in the neck at a pub in Lymington Avenue, Wood Green, on 19 April 2002. The attack may have followed a disagreement between him and a group of other young men. Three people were charged with firearm-related offences, but no murder charges were issued.
April 2002	Edward Smith	Battersea, London	42-year-old Smith was found strangled in bushes in Batten Street near Clapham Junction railway station on 23 April 2002. He was unemployed, single, and lived in Leatherhead in Surrey.
April 2002	Mohammed Saeed	Birmingham	54-year-old Saeed was stabbed in the abdomen outside his home on Clodeshall Road, Birmingham, during the early hours of 24 April 2002. A suspect in the crime was his nephew, who CIA reports suggest was killed in Pakistan by a US drone in November 2008. He had left the UK following his uncle's murder and was said to have become involved in the planning of terrorist attacks.
April 2002	Terry Morgan	Rugby, Warwickshire	69-year-old grandfather Morgan was shot in the chest on the driveway of his home in Brownsover on 24 April 2002. Police thought it was a contract killing. Morgan was said to have been an anti-drugs campaigner for the local area and neighbours believed his murder was connected to that. There were arrests over the killing, but all those arrested were released without charge.
3 May 2002	Leonard Farrar	Leeds	71-year-old Farrar, a retired merchant navy captain, was stabbed to death in his house on Cardinal Road, Beeston, Leeds, after being restrained and possibly tortured. Farrar was the victim of a distraction-type burglary two to three weeks earlier and his car was set on fire the night before police found his body.
19 May 2002	Wajahat Sheikh	Attacked in King's Cross, London, died in hospital	Sheikh, 21, died within an hour of suffering a dropkick assault at a Pentonville Road nightclub known as Scala. Although the number of potential witnesses was in excess of 500, the culprit evaded detection.
20 May 2002	Sydney Baldwin	Newcastle	44-year-old Baldwin's body was found in the kitchen of his home in Heaton by a window cleaner the day after he was bludgeoned to death in the property. Because the assailant appeared not to have gained access using force, detectives believed that it was someone the victim knew. A suspect was arrested but died in a road traffic collision before the evidence was sufficient to charge him.
23 May 2002	Zennen Blackburn	Manchester	A man got out of a car and shot 27-year-old Blackburn dead in Moston late in the afternoon. Investigators still do not know why the crime was committed, but rumour has it that it was to settle a debt owed to a criminal with whom Blackburn had fallen out.
June 2002	Geoffrey Windsor	Beaulieu Heights, London	57-year-old Windsor was beaten to death with a car aerial in Beaulieu Heights, a park between the districts of Upper Norwood and South Norwood, on 26 June 2002. Homophobia was suspected to have motivated the attack.
June 2002	Alexander Blue	Glasgow	41-year-old Blue, a businessman who co-owned a taxi company, was found with head injuries outside his home in Dowanhill, in Glasgow's west end, on 25 June 2002. He died at the Southern General Hospital two days later.
July 2002	Joseph Byrne	Attacked in Oxford, died in hospital in Aylesbury, Buckinghamshire	Paramedics attending a flat in Littlemore on 7 May 2002 were told by 61-year-old Byrne that he had had a liquid thrown at him. The liquid was a chemical that had caused his skin to become tightly stretched and his head to swell to twice its normal size, and he died at Stoke Mandeville Hospital on 1 July after breathing difficulties brought on by swelling in his airways triggered a heart attack. At Byrne's inquest, the assistant deputy coroner and a detective were critical of hospital staff for not informing the police of the assault sooner.
July 2002	Jonathan McMurray	Attacked in Wood Green, London, died in hospital	20-year-old McMurray had left a pub to walk home when he was stabbed during a clash between the people he was with and another group. The incident happened at nighttime on 17 July 2002, and McMurray died at North Middlesex Hospital, Edmonton, about two hours later.
July 2002	Damian Cope	London	22-year-old Cope was shot in the abdomen outside Browns, a nightclub in Great Queen Street, central London, on 29 July 2002. According to two friends, he told them who the shooter was before dying, and though one of them would not give the police a name, the other did so. The alleged shooter was acquitted because Cope's friends refused to testify and two doctors independently concluded that the nature of his injuries made it highly unlikely that Cope would have been able to communicate by speech seven minutes after sustaining them, as claimed by one of his friends. The acquitted man was himself murdered in 2006.
August 2002	Monica Flaherty	Bradford, West Yorkshire	62-year-old Flaherty, a grandmother who had discovered her murdered daughter's body in 1990, was stabbed in the chest during a street brawl on 3 August 2002, and managed to make her way to her home in Priestman Street, Manningham, Bradford, before dying there. West Yorkshire Police charged a 35-year-old man with her murder but later dropped the charge.
August 2002	David Marlow	Sheffield	39-year-old Marlow was found dead by his 13-year-old son at their home in Lupton Crescent, Lowedges, Sheffield, on 3 August 2002, having suffered blunt-force trauma from an assault in Dyche Lane, Jordanthorpe, a few days earlier. Marlow was said by some of his neighbours to have been a drug dealer, and six people arrested over his death were charged with conspiracy to supply Class A drugs.
August 2002	Thomas Breen	Attacked in Camden Town, London, died in hospital	50-year-old Breen, a builder from Downpatrick in Northern Ireland, was stabbed in the chest outside a pub in Camden High Street on 10 August 2002. Although the street was covered by CCTV cameras, none filmed the incident because all were pointing away from where it was taking place.
August 2002	Nikolaos Pittakis	West Green, London	Police found the body of Greek-born Pittakis, 60, in his Belmont Road flat on 23 August 2002 after being informed by a neighbour that a foul smell was emanating from there. He had died from stab wounds up to two weeks earlier.
August 2002	Lorraine Turner	Norwich, Norfolk	37-year-old Turner's 10-year-old son and eight-year-old daughter found her murdered at her home in Old Catton, Norwich, on 17 August 2002. A 21-year-old roofer was charged with the killing of the former newspaper journalist before being cleared in May 2003.
August 2002	Darren Birt	Glasgow	Birt, 22, died from injuries sustained in an attack in Barlanark, Glasgow, on 28 August 2002. He was chased from Edinburgh Road to Burnett Road and was found lying in the road in Calvay Place. In March 2022, police announced that they were reinvestigating the case.
September 2002	Kevin Nunes	Pattingham, Staffordshire	On 19 September 2002, 20-year-old Nunes's body was found dumped in a country lane about two miles from the outskirts of his home city of Wolverhampton after he had been shot five times. Although five men went to prison in 2008 for the drug dealer and amateur footballer's murder, they were released in 2012 because of failures to do with disclosure to the defence. The disclosure failures concerned information relating to the key prosecution witness.
September 2002	Gordon Ross	Glasgow	36-year-old Ross was stabbed to death outside a pub on Shettleston Road, Glasgow, on 24 September 2002, possibly because of an attack on a gangland rival earlier in the month. A close associate of gangster Tam McGraw, Ross was an enforcer and drug supplier who, in 1998, had walked free from a trial where he was accused of smuggling 220lb of cannabis resin.
October 2002	Julie Dorsett	Walthamstow, London	Dorsett, a 33-year-old sex worker, vanished in early October 2002, and her skull and upper body were discovered buried in an allotment in 2008. It is believed her remains were placed there shortly after she disappeared. In 2012 Dorsett's former partner was cleared of killing her and burying her body.
October 2002	Billy Sibbald	Edinburgh	Father-of-three Sibbald, 48, went missing from Joppa, Edinburgh, on 8 October 2002 after telling his wife he was meeting business associates. Three months later his decomposing body was found in woodland next to a lay-by near the outskirts of the city. There have been various theories for the pub landlord's murder, including that it was a gangland killing. Little information came through to the police in their hunt for the culprit(s).
October 2002	David Draycott	Sutton-in-Ashfield, Nottinghamshire	40-year-old Draycott was shot when he pulled up outside his Sutton-in-Ashfield home on 7 October 2002, and died four days later at King's Mill Hospital in the town. A man who may be linked to the case was convicted of drug trafficking and smuggling by a French court in December 2018 and handed a 22-year jail sentence.
October 2002	Devon Brown	Shepherd's Bush, London	39-year-old Brown, a Jamaican-born father-of-two, was shot dead in Shepherd's Bush on the afternoon of 15 October 2002. Operation Trident investigated the murder.
October 2002	Thomas Scott	Attacked in Kentish Town, London, died in hospital	On the night of 19/20 October 2002, 34-year-old Scott and his 28-year-old half-brother debarked at Kentish Town tube station to change trains after taking the wrong branch of the northern line, walked out of the station because the last train had gone, and were attacked by a gang. Scott was beaten with a knuckleduster and a bread crate. Four people aged 16 to 20 were found guilty of violent disorder, but there were no convictions for murder or manslaughter.
7 November 2002	John Shippam	Nottingham	25-year-old Shippam was found shot dead in his flat in Bestwood, Nottingham. He had been assaulted at The Anchor Inn in Gunthorpe two days previously, and police believed the incidents were probably linked.
7/8 November 2002	Andrew Brown	Streatham, London	28-year-old Brown ran a scooter shop in Westcote Road, Streatham, and was found stabbed to death in his nearby flat after his girlfriend had a locksmith open its door because nobody had seen or heard from him since the previous evening.
9 November 2002	Theresa Jacobs	Nottingham	In front of about 40 people and within minutes of leaving a Radford nightclub in the early hours, 33-year-old Jacobs was shot point-blank in a crime thought to have been drug-related. She was pronounced dead at the Queen's Medical Centre later that day.
9 November 2002	Alisan Dogan	Harringay, London	43-year-old Dogan was stabbed to death and others were injured when a café on Green Lanes was stormed by a gang. A man was acquitted of his murder in a case allegedly arising from extortion disputes between groups of Turkish and Kurdish people.
10 November 2002	Martin Gorman	Attacked in Tottenham, London, died in hospital	24-year-old Gorman and a friend were outside White Hart Lane railway station when Gorman was stabbed by a man with whom he had been arguing. The man was with a female companion and they fled in the direction of Great Cambridge Road.
13 November 2002	Jason Spence	Attacked in Great Barr, Birmingham, died in hospital in West Bromwich	31-year-old Spence was shot by an occupant of a silver Mitsubishi Galant estate car travelling along Cardington Avenue. The two people in the car had been seen arguing with him a few minutes earlier outside a nearby pub he had just left.
23 November 2002	Martin Simpson	Leicester	59-year-old Simpson, a well-liked regular at various Leicester pubs, bars and betting shops, was assaulted in Leicester city centre on the night of 22–23 November 2002. Finding him unconscious in the middle of Albion Street, a taxi driver raised the alarm, but it was discovered upon his arrival at the local hospital that Simpson had already died from his injuries. Detectives were keen to trace two young men captured on CCTV near the scene during the night in question.
30 November 2002	Tony Nicholls	Brixton, London	44-year-old Nicholls was shot as he sat in a stationary car near the junction of Tulse Hill and Brixton Water Lane, Brixton. He had no fixed address at the time.
1 December 2002	Susan McDonald	Broughton Astley, Leicestershire	A fire that was started in a wheelie bin outside 47-year-old McDonald's house resulted in her death when it trapped her in her bedroom, having spread to that room via the hall and stairway after burning through the front door.
5 December 2002	Wayne Trotter	Attacked in Borehamwood, Hertfordshire, died in hospital in London	30-year-old Trotter was walking home from work just after midnight on 5 December 2002 when he was doused with petrol and set on fire. He suffered 90% burns and was heard to say: "They threw something at me. I was blinded and couldn't see a thing." He was attacked on Dales Path, Farriers Way Estate.
7 December 2002	Debbie Remorozo	Oldham, Lancashire	26-year-old Remorozo was stabbed to death in her flat in Oldham on 7 December 2002. She was attacked with two knives from the kitchen and her body was left in a crucifix position with a tablecloth covering her face. A man and a woman were arrested in April 2003 and released without charge in May. Remorozo was a nurse who worked at the Royal Oldham Hospital and was originally from the Philippines.
12 December 2002	Daniel Regan	Haydock, Merseyside	25-year-old Regan was found dead in his house on Station Road with a gunshot wound to the chest. Nearby was the burnt-out shell of the vehicle the killer is thought to have arrived in: a stolen grey or silver Rover.
15 December 2002	Selorn Gbesemete and Mohamed Korneh	Southall, London	Gbesemete, 21, was shot in the neck and Korneh, also 21, was shot in the head at the Tudor Rose nightclub in Southall during an event whose aim was to discourage young black men from carrying guns. Rapper Dizzee Rascal performed at the event. A suspect was acquitted in May 2009 – 13 months after another suspect was himself shot dead.
15 December 2002	Carl Seaton	Liverpool	28-year-old Seaton was shot after leaving Edge Hill's Weighing Machine pub. A man was charged but his trial was stopped because too many witnesses were absent. Seaton had appeared in a 1998 film about the increase in gun crime in inner-city areas of Britain, in which he portrayed a man who practised with a gun bought for self-defence.
26 December 2002	Mario O'Brien Clarke	Hackney, London	25-year-old Clarke, an off-duty soldier, was shot outside his home in Morning Lane, Hackney. Police believed him to have been a victim of mistaken identity.

== 2003 ==
Year	Victim(s)	Location of body or bodies	Notes
3 January 2003	Edward Byrne	Attacked in Knotty Ash, Liverpool, died at Whiston Hospital	A lone gunman shot 66-year-old Byrne in a pub where about 40 drinkers were present. Investigators believed that someone other than him was meant to be targeted.
13 January 2003	David Warrilow	Chelmsley Wood, West Midlands	The 37-year-old welder and father-of-two suffered serious head injuries when he was run over as he tried to stop thieves taking his van from outside GB Singh's newsagents in Willow Way, Chelmsley Wood. His murder was featured on Crimewatch in February 2003.
14 January 2003	Brenda Wynne	Liverpool	63-year-old Wynne died three days after being pushed over in a robbery on Castlefield Road, West Derby, Liverpool, on 11 January 2003. The attackers were two men in their early 20s and Wynne's handbag was stolen.
18 January 2003	Kevin Clark	Glasgow	22-year-old Clark was discovered dead on waste ground in Carntyne with his head slashed and a gunshot wound to his back. In February of the following year a 24-year-old man was acquitted of murder and his father of cutting up the murder suspect's clothes.
29 January 2003	Domicela Skiera	Ealing, London	85-year-old Skiera, a Polish widow, was beaten to death at her house in Ranelagh Road, Ealing, and the property was ransacked. A hunt soon commenced for a Polish man who began lodging there on 27 January 2003 and disappeared on the day of the murder.
3 February 2003	Margaret Muller	Victoria Park, London	Muller, 27, was fatally stabbed while jogging in the park. Police suspect she may have been killed in a robbery gone wrong.
4 February 2003	Paul Savage	Attacked in Mold, Flintshire, died in hospital in Wrexham	Postman Savage, 30, died after being attacked while on his round in Mold, Flintshire. He was beaten with a wooden baton and found lying in a pool of blood on Clayton Road. The police later said that they knew the reason Savage was killed, but did not divulge it. There is a £100,000 reward for information.
6 February 2003	Beverley Brinkley	Attacked in Harlow, Essex, died at Addenbrooke's Hospital in Cambridge	Brinkley, a 35-year-old woman with three children, died four days after being severely assaulted by two men in the lobby of the third floor of the block of flats she lived in.
14 February 2003	Mohammed Mahmood	Slough, Berkshire	25-year-old Mahmood died at Wexham Park Hospital after a police car took him there because he was seen in an injured state as the vehicle was passing through the area. The cause of his death was a stab wound to the chest inflicted during the theft of his friend's car by a group of four men.
March 2003	Billy McPhee	Glasgow	McPhee, a 38-year-old who was gangster Tam McGraw's right-hand man, was fatally attacked as he sat on a stool in a family-friendly pub in Baillieston, Glasgow, on 8 March 2003. The assailant entered the pub, walked up to him and stabbed him a number of times before walking out of the building. Lack of evidence against a man arraigned for murder led to the collapse of his trial the day after it began.
March 2003	Andrew Jones	Liverpool	On 9 March 2003, 18-year-old Jones was punched to the ground in Hanover Street in Liverpool when he encountered a group of people there at night after becoming separated from friends. A man who was in that group was acquitted of his manslaughter.
March 2003	Thilipan Thangavadivel	Ilford, London	24-year-old Thangavadivel's murder in Ilford on 19 March 2003 apparently took place in the context of gangland conflicts between Tamil people.
March 2003	Shaham Ali	Birmingham	Ali, 30, was shot on 17 March 2003 whilst using a public telephone in Small Heath, and died seven days later in hospital. Four men charged over his death were accused at their trial of targeting him because of his support for the secretary of Birmingham's main mosque, who was suspected of impregnating the wife of its imam. The two accused of Ali's murder were both found not guilty of that charge, although one of them was, along with the two other defendants, convicted of assaulting and unlawfully imprisoning him. A second man named Azmat Yaqub who was injured in the same shooting, was shot dead in July 2004 and his murder is also yet to be solved.
March 2003	Peter Singleton	Wirral, Merseyside	A masked gunman shot 26-year-old Singleton in front of his girlfriend and young son as they got out of a car in Column Road, West Kirby, on 27 March 2003. Singleton suffered injuries to his head and stomach and died at Arrowe Park Hospital in Woodchurch.
April 2003	Stephen Colby	Great Yarmouth, Norfolk	47-year-old Colby was battered to death in the terraced house in which he lived on his own. His two sons said they discovered his body there on 11 April 2003 – nothing was missing – and the following year, one of them was tried for his murder but not found guilty. Because there were claims that Colby told people he was now wealthier thanks to money left to him in his aunt's will, an early line of inquiry pursued the theory that the murder was a result of a bungled burglary.
May 2003	Viola Mead	Attacked in Wendover, died in hospital in Aylesbury (both in Buckinghamshire)	Mead, 85, of Dobbins Lane in Wendover, was attacked in her home by two men in late April 2003. She was found semi-conscious in her kitchen by a family friend on 28 April and died on 13 May in Stoke Mandeville Hospital. Mead gave a description of one of her attackers before she died: he was 5 feet 10 inches (1.78 m) tall, slim, had a narrow face with a dark yellowish complexion, and was wearing a black jumper with a yellow motif on the left.
May 2003	Otis Taylor	Peckham, London	On 21 May 2003, 33-year-old Taylor was shot in the head at around 1:00 a.m. in Sassoon House, a block of flats on St Mary's Road in Peckham. It happened in the stairwell and the month before he and his pregnant fiancée were due to get married.
June 2003	Darren Manders	Middlesbrough	31-year-old Manders was a drug addict living in Bow Street, Middlesbrough. He was beaten and sustained massive head injuries after vanishing on 5 June 2003, and his body was found under a pile of logs in woodland at Nunthorpe on 2 July.
June 2003	Balkaran Deep Singh	Southall, London	On 7 June 2003, 25-year-old Singh was beaten about the head and stabbed six times in Western Road, Southall, after crouching down – apparently to retrieve something from his inside pocket – while he and four companions were being chased by a larger group. Verbal hostility between the two groups had preceded the chase. Nobody was charged with Singh's murder, but four people were found guilty of threatening behaviour.
June 2003	Partheepan Balasingham and Kishokumar Balachandiran	London	23-year-old Balasingham and 18-year-old Balachandiran suffered separate attacks on 8 June 2003, but both were thought to have been perpetrated by the same 12-strong gang. The attack on Balasingham, who died four days later, occurred outside a restaurant in Wembley at about 1:00 a.m., while that on Balachandiran, who died a week later, occurred after he was abducted from outside a bar in Ilford at about 2:00 a.m. Balachandiran was beaten, tortured and thrown into the River Roding, and had hypothermia and numerous injuries when found there. The crimes were linked to Tamil gang warfare and apparently followed a bar fight involving Balachandiran earlier that night.
June 2003	Neil Nortrop (a.k.a. Neil McGarthland)	Body not found	32-year-old Nortrop left his home town of Brixham, Devon, on 10 June 2003 to visit a friend in Greenwich or Dartford. He made a telephone call two days later but was never heard from again. The case was investigated as a murder by police, and a man and a woman from Greenwich were arrested in 2005, but no charges were brought. Nortrop's blue Ford Mondeo disappeared with him.
August 2003	Frank Bayley	Stoke-on-Trent, Staffordshire	Three men went to court for alleged complicity in the murder of 66-year-old Bayley, but all of them were acquitted. Bayley had been asphyxiated at his Hartshill Road off-licence on 18 August 2003.
August 2003	Naveed Saleem	Birmingham	32-year-old Saleem's fiancée found him stabbed to death in his Range Rover early on 26 August 2003. He had left her home the previous night to drive back to his and been set upon as he got into the vehicle. Saleem's Rolex watch was not taken, nor was any of the £250 he had in his wallet. Two men were cleared of his murder in 2005.
August 2003	Justin Maynard	Manchester	19-year-old Maynard was fatally shot in Tugford Close, Moss Side, Manchester, on 26 August 2003. He died of his injures at the scene.
September 2003	Natalie Putt	Body not found	Putt, a 17-year-old mother of an 11-week-old baby, disappeared from her home in Lower Gornal, Dudley, West Midlands, on 1 September 2003, and police believe she was murdered. The father of her baby claimed that Putt, who had told him that she wanted a break from their relationship and was seeing another man at the time of her disappearance, went out to buy cigarettes and never returned, leaving him to care for their son. An inquest in January 2019 noted that a T-shirt with two tiny drops of Putt's blood on it had been found in her loft, and concluded that she had likely died at the address or nearby on 1 September 2003. The father has been interviewed by police a number of times, but there has never been sufficient evidence to charge anyone.
September 2003	Shumin Hussain	St Albans, Hertfordshire	Hussain, 29, fell to his death from a window of a ninth-floor flat on 7 September 2003 during a fracas in which a number of people were involved.
September 2003	Amir Abdula Bakir	Nottingham	27-year-old Bakir was stabbed to death and a 20-year-old man was stabbed and seriously wounded in a street battle in St Ann's, Nottingham, on 8 September 2003. Described as "tribal warfare", the battle was thought to have been between Iraqi Kurds, and its participants (who possibly numbered as many as 100) had in some cases travelled there from places as far afield as Newcastle, Coventry (Bakir's home city) and Peterborough. Two men were acquitted of Bakir's murder, but 28 were convicted of conspiracy to commit violent disorder.
September 2003	Stephen Henry	Bristol	32-year-old Henry was shot dead in an apparent contract killing during the early hours of 14 September 2003 as he was about to get into his car after leaving a nightclub. He was said to have been an underworld enforcer. Nine people were acquitted in 2005 of charges ranging from murder to perverting the course of justice.
September/October 2003	James Brodie	Body not found	Brodie was involved in a robbery at an Arnold jewellery shop in which Marian Bates, the woman who co-owned the shop with her husband, was shot dead. Brodie, who was 19 and is believed to have been the one who pulled the trigger, disappeared soon afterwards, and it is thought that his criminal associates killed him because the robbery had not gone as planned. Brodie had an accomplice when he was in the shop, and in 2005 that man went to prison for Bates's murder, as well as for conspiracy to rob, possession of a firearm with intent to endanger life and GBH with intent for beating her husband with a crowbar. In February 2013, another man who had been jailed for conspiring to rob the shop was charged with Brodie's murder, but failure to gather enough evidence against him led to the charge being dropped in late April of that year. Police made unsuccessful searches for Brodie's remains at a farm and in a canal in Lincolnshire.
October 2003	Michael Jones	Bermondsey, London	53-year-old Jones received 13 gunshot wounds at Bromleigh House, Abbey Street, Bermondsey, on 16 October 2003 – apparently after answering the door to his home there. He was shot in the head and abdomen and died at the scene.
October 2003	Eamonn Bloodworth	Leicester	46-year-old Bloodworth died on 18 October 2003 after being kicked and stamped on, and his body was found at the junction of Ravensbridge Drive and Blackbird Road. A man who stood trial for the murder in 2004 was cleared of any involvement in it.
October 2003	Ronald Kerr	Glasgow	49-year-old Kerr was removed from his home and pronounced dead after firefighters arrived following an arson attack on the property in Lamberton Drive, Cardonald, Glasgow, on 21 October 2003.
November 2003	Charlene Downes	Body not found	14-year-old Downes went missing from Blackpool town centre on the night of 1 November 2003. Police believe she was a victim of local grooming and child sexual exploitation. Two men were tried in connection with her death in 2007, but the jury failed to reach a verdict. A re-trial planned for 2008 collapsed.
November 2003	Jason Stock	Hull, East Yorkshire	33-year-old Stock was found with 66 separate injuries in a ground floor flat on Alexandra Road, Hull, in the early hours of 2 November 2003. He died that afternoon at Hull Royal Infirmary, the cause of death being a blow to the head. Stock had been out drinking on the night of the attack. His girlfriend and two men were arrested but later released due to lack of evidence.
November 2003	Graham and Carol Fisher	Near Wadebridge, Cornwall	60-year-old Graham Fisher and his 53-year-old wife Carol were bludgeoned and shot – apparently during a failed burglary – at their bungalow near Wadebridge on 5 November 2003. The bungalow was next to a petrol station run by the couple. Police were told by a prison informant that he had heard a man confess, and this man and his brother were convicted of the murders in January 2006 but successfully appealed in 2023.
November 2003	Omar Watson	Nottingham	24-year-old Watson was shot in a Radford hair salon and died at the Queen's Medical Centre on 7 November 2003. It was the second time that year that he had been the victim of a gun attack, with the earlier, non-fatal attack having taken place in August.
November 2003	Erkan Konakli	Clapton, London	23-year-old Konakli, a Turkish Cypriot involved in drug trafficking, was last seen in Stoke Newington on the evening of 7 November 2003 and then killed in a gangland execution, suffering a single bullet wound to the back of the head. His body was found in a barrel in the canal at Clapton later that month. The drug dealer who dumped it there was jailed for four years for attempting to pervert the course of justice, and it was accepted that he played no part in the murder itself. He claimed to have discovered the victim's body in his flat and to have got rid of it because the thought of a police investigation concerned him.
November 2003	Sandra Gant	Body not found	Mother-of-four Gant was last seen leaving an address in Hayes Road, Clacton, Essex, on 15 November 2003. Although she has not been found, Essex Police believe the 48-year-old was murdered. Four people have been arrested over Gant's murder, including an 18-year-old, but no one has ever been charged.
November 2003	Gamal Fares Mallwi	Attacked in West Kensington, London, died in hospital	44-year-old Mallwi, an Egyptian locally known as George, was fatally shot at the junction of North End Road and Thaxton Road as he was about to get into a car on 28 November 2003. A fish bar he owned was nearby. Mallwi's younger brother was shot in the incident as well, but he survived and later returned to Egypt.
December 2003	Peter Stone	Attacked in Cottenham, Cambridgeshire, died in hospital	37-year-old Stone, a postman and father-of-two from Cottenham, was attacked near the Chequers pub, where he had been drinking, on the night of 29/30 November 2003. He was found with serious head injuries in the early hours of 30 November and taken to Addenbrooke's Hospital, where he died on 1 December.
December 2003	Joanne Broome	Renton, West Dunbartonshire	18-year-old Broome was last seen on 3 December 2003. Her body was discovered the following day in a flat which had been set alight on Main Street, Renton, about three miles (5 km) from her home in Dumbarton. She had died from stab wounds. A man in his 40s was acquitted of Broome's murder in August 2004.
December 2003	Leon Forbes	Attacked in Clapham, London, died in hospital	21-year-old Forbes, a music producer, was shot while driving his mother's car out of a car park with a passenger just after 12:15 a.m. on 7 December 2003.
December 2003	Kenneth Broughton	Derby	24-year-old Broughton and his 26-year-old brother had a ground floor flat whose letterbox had petrol poured through it at around 4:00 a.m. on 7 December 2003. The petrol was then ignited, and the resulting blaze at the property in the Derby suburb of Mackworth killed Broughton but not his brother. Two youths went on trial in 2004 and were acquitted.
December 2003	Evelyn Jackson	Manchester	97-year-old Jackson was punched and kicked at her flat in the Longsight area of Manchester on 28 November 2003, and her Christmas savings of £1,000 were stolen. She died from her injuries at a hospital in the city 12 days later.
December 2003	Robin Williams	Tottenham, London	47-year-old Williams was killed at his home in Lordship Lane, Tottenham, on 31 December 2003. He was battered and stabbed and then left in the bath. Williams was the landlord of a woman who would be acquitted of his murder after two juries could not settle on a verdict, but she was jailed in 2011 for a murder that occurred in December 2010. The second murder was of her ex-partner's 91-year-old father, whose head she battered with a bottle of wine at another property in Tottenham before leaving the residence with money stolen from it.

== 2004 ==
Year	Victim(s)	Location of body or bodies	Notes
January 2004	Richard Barrington	Attacked in Brundall, Norfolk, died at the Norfolk and Norwich Hospital	Barrington was pushed into a brick pillar and received a fatal blow to the head or chest as he and some friends were returning to a New Year's Eve party, although it was not witnessed by his companions. The friends claimed that they and Barrington were first set upon by another group of youths after leaving the party to get some tobacco from his home, and that they took a rake, a copper pipe and a baseball bat from there too in case they needed them to defend themselves whilst heading back. The death of 17-year-old Barrington sparked a murder inquiry, but the police later decided that because he was carrying the rake when assaulted, the inquiry would have to be dropped. His inquest, however, found that he was unlawfully killed nonetheless.
January 2004	Danny McDonald	Liverpool	20-year-old McDonald, a key member of a gang known as the Crocky Crew or the Crocky Young Guns, was in a pub in West Derby on New Year's Day when a masked man walked over to him and shot him and a 19-year-old friend, who survived. Joey Thompson, himself now the victim of an unsolved murder, was a suspect.
January 2004	Nureni Sheikh	Manchester	Sheikh, a 19-year-old London student on a visit to Manchester for a wedding, was shot in the upper body outside a Moss Side café on 10 January 2004, likely as a result of being mistaken for another youth.
January 2004	Orville Donovan Gordon	Beachy Head, East Sussex	39-year-old Gordon's body was discovered on 17 January 2004 in a barrel which had been pushed off the cliffs at Beachy Head. Gordon was from south London; he had been stabbed and his blood was found in a disused restaurant in Brixton. Police believed his murder was revenge for a robbery and three men were arrested, but getting information from witnesses proved very difficult.
January 2004	Quang Vin Vu	New Cross, London	29-year-old Vu was knifed and clubbed in White Post Street, New Cross, on 21 January 2004. A Vietnamese friend of his was cleared of his murder after being tried at the Old Bailey.
February 2004	John Luper	Leeds	57-year-old Luper was walking his dog near his home in Alwoodley, Leeds, late on 16 February 2004 when a four- or five-strong gang forced him into the property before stealing about £100,000 worth of cash and valuables. Luper, whose wife, daughter and au pair were tied up during the burglary, was a businessman and died from asphyxiation.
February 2004	Craig Eaton	Liverpool	22-year-old Eaton worked at Alder Hey Children's Hospital and was shot shortly after getting off a bus in Molyneux Road, Kensington, Liverpool, on 24 February 2004. Merseyside Police believe his murder was a case of mistaken identity.
March 2004	Camille Gordon	London	23-year-old Gordon was stabbed at her workplace, the Blue Bunny Club in Archer Street, Soho, on 1 March 2004. A man had visited the clip joint and become involved in a dispute about the payment of his bill, after which he attacked Gordon in the doorway of the club and ran away. She died later that evening at University College Hospital.
March 2004	Anton Hyman	River Brent, London	17-year-old Hyman's body was found in the River Brent between Greenford and Hanwell on 21 March 2004. He had been beaten, shot in the back, slashed across the throat and fatally stabbed in the heart the night before. Police thought the attack had not been committed at random, despite Hyman's criminal record describing only small-scale offending on his part.
April 2004	Justyn Morgan	Attacked in Walworth, London, died in hospital	24-year-old Morgan was shot outside Bagel King (an all-night café on Walworth Road) in the early hours of 13 April 2004 during a disturbance that started inside. Up to 20 youths were involved in the disturbance, and Morgan was shot several times in the chest. A murder trial ground to a halt after it was found that witnesses were unreliable and much of the evidence against the accused man was hearsay or second-hand.
April 2004	Ursula Caddock	Mugged in Wanstead, London, died in hospital	82-year-old Caddock died on 27 April 2004 from acute peritonitis triggered by a fall she suffered during a street robbery near her home on 8 April. The mugger stole her handbag and went away before coming back and stealing her bus pass too.
May 2004	Elijah Fagan	Birmingham	24-year-old Fagan was punched to the ground and shot in the abdomen on 2 May 2004 after getting involved in an argument with a fellow cyclist in Foxglove Way, Handsworth. The gunman was then seen riding off in the direction of Alexandra Avenue.
May 2004	Cheung Shing Cheung	Birkenhead, Merseyside	51-year-old Cheung Shing Cheung was officially unemployed but made a living by lending money and charging interest. He left a casino in Liverpool on 13 May 2004 and later spoke to a neighbour before his strangled and battered body was found in his flat on 15 May. Raised voices and a scream were said to have been heard coming from the property during the early hours of 14 May. Two men alleged to have argued with the victim that night were cleared of murder in December 2009.
June 2004	Adrian Marriott	Brixton, London	20-year-old Marriott was shot five times in the head in a park off Barrington Road, Brixton, on 9 June 2004. It was claimed at the trial of three gang members accused of plotting to murder him that they did so because of his refusal to convert to Islam, but the trial came to a premature end when a prosecutor revealed that new evidence meant there was no longer a realistic prospect of any convictions for conspiracy to murder.
June 2004	Nicholas Davies	Clapham, London	A single bullet had penetrated 25-year-old Davies's lungs and heart when he was found dead in an alley off Landor Road, Clapham, on 12 June 2004. A man who was to be acquitted of his murder said that the crime had been committed because the victim had developed a habit of attacking and robbing other drug dealers.
June 2004	Kevin Lavelle	Banbury, Oxfordshire	29-year-old Lavelle, a father-of-two from Bootle, Merseyside, was in Banbury on a work contract when he was beaten with a dumbbell at a pub on 24 June 2004. In 2006, a trial was halted and a man found not guilty after the judge had come to the conclusion that it had not been demonstrated that any fatal blows had been delivered by him.
June 2004	Martin Toner	Langbank, Renfrewshire	34-year-old Toner went missing in late June 2004, and his body was discovered by a farmer using a tractor to remove bales of hay from a field on 13 July. Toner had been stabbed about 12 times and had his throat cut, and two men were acquitted of his murder in 2015. A drug-related motive is suspected.
July 2004	Azmat Yaqub	Birmingham	Yaqub, 35, was in a gym in Sparkhill on 29 July 2004 when two men with machine guns entered the building and one of them shot him dead. Detectives were unable to find a link between this incident and a shooting in March 2003 that Yaqub survived.
July 2004	Richard Clarke	Leeds	Clarke, 32, was shot at point-blank range as he slept at his home in Moorland Avenue, Leeds, on the night of 29 July 2004. The weapon used was a 12-bore shotgun. Clarke's girlfriend was sleeping next to him at the time of the attack and her three teenage sons were also in the house.
August 2004	Tom Brown	Southgate, London	27-year-old Brown, a BBC library assistant, was stabbed as he walked home along Southgate High Street in the early hours of 21 August 2004, but none of his belongings were stolen. An e-fit of the suspected perpetrator was issued.
August/September 2004	Lamduan Armitage	Near Pen-y-ghent, North Yorkshire	The body of Armitage, a Thai woman in her mid-30s, was found in a stream in the Yorkshire Dales on 20 September 2004. She had died in an undetermined manner a week to three weeks earlier. Armitage's husband was bailed in February 2025 after he had returned to the UK from Thailand and been arrested on suspicion of her murder.
c. September 2004	Aivaras Danilevičius	Bracknell, Berkshire	A body was found wrapped in bin bags and a blanket in Hawthorn Lane, Bracknell, on 24 July 2015. The skull was found to have two injuries indicating blunt-force trauma. The man was thought to have been 30–40 years old at the time of his death, but it is still not known how his body got to Hawthorn Lane or who put it there. In July 2016 he was identified as Aivaras Danilevičius, a Lithuanian who had gone missing towards the end of the summer of 2004.
September 2004	Patrick Devine	Claudy, County Londonderry, Northern Ireland	Devine was found shot dead in his home at Stranagalwilly on 13 September 2004. The 51-year-old was a sheep farmer and part-time nurse. He was shot six times through a window as he ate his dinner and then at point-blank range three times in the head with a .22 rifle.
September 2004	Daniel Blackett	Attacked in Thorpe Green, died in hospital in Chertsey (both in Surrey)	Blackett, a 36-year-old millionaire, was shot five times on his 4-acre (1.6 ha) estate on 18 September 2004, despite having recently had a 10-foot (3.0 m) fence put up around the edge of it along with signs warning of guard dogs and CCTV. It was a murder believed to have been committed or ordered by someone keen for him to be eliminated as a rival in crime.
September 2004	Mick Love	Swindon, Wiltshire	40-year-old Love was stabbed to death in the street in Swindon's Old Town during the early hours of 27 September 2004 less than half an hour after the postal worker and a friend had parted company. When his body was discovered, money that he had had on him was now missing, as was his mobile phone. A man charged with Love's murder and with robbery was not found guilty of either.
October 2004	Warren Graham	Attacked in Clapton, London, died in hospital	18-year-old Graham was stabbed in Lower Clapton Road's Palace Pavilion nightclub on 26 October 2004 after a row about control of the microphone started between a friend of his and other youths on the stage.
November 2004	Paul Mooney	Liverpool	A gunshot fired from close range killed 35-year-old Mooney at a friend's bungalow in Croxteth on 13 November 2004. Three men were found not guilty of murder or conspiracy to murder, and in October 2016, one of them – Blake Brown – was himself shot dead. The killing of Brown is likewise an unsolved murder at present.
November 2004	Alistair Wilson	Attacked in Nairn, died in hospital in Inverness (both in the Scottish Highlands)	30-year-old Wilson was shot on the doorstep of his home in Crescent Road, Nairn, near Inverness, in the evening of 28 November 2004 after his wife opened their front door to the killer. Police were not aware of a motive. Detectives remain puzzled by some peculiarities of the case. Prior to shooting Wilson, the killer asked for him by name, then handed him an empty envelope with "Paul" written on it. Wilson took it inside and showed it to his wife before returning to the door where he was gunned down. The envelope was taken away by the killer when he fled. Police revealed that the weapon was a rare 1920s CG Haenel Waffen pistol, referred to as a "ladies' gun", and manufactured in Suhl, Germany. In April 2022, Police Scotland announced that Wilson's involvement in a local planning dispute was a likely motive for his murder.
December 2004	Courtney Davies	Forest of Dean, Gloucestershire	A burnt body discovered in the Forest of Dean on 20 December 2004 was that of 53-year-old Davies, a violent career criminal previously jailed for robbery. The body had over 70 stab wounds. A 32-year-old man was charged with murder following the discovery of his DNA on a cigarette end recovered at the scene, but proceedings ended and he was acquitted at a preliminary hearing in April 2006. He had admitted driving the deceased to the forest on 19 December 2004 but always denied involvement in his death.
December 2004	Joey Peloe	Attacked in Speke, Liverpool, died at Whiston Hospital	45-year-old Peloe was shot on 28 December 2004 at the front door of his house on Little Heath Road. In 2006, two men – one of whom had a girlfriend for whom Peloe was said to have been a love rival – were acquitted of his murder and a third of incitement to cause grievous bodily harm.
December 2004	Solomon Martin	Thornton Heath, London	24-year-old Martin died when the Renault Clio he was a back seat passenger in was shot at repeatedly on 31 December 2004. Police believed that the gunmen actually meant to kill the driver, who was not harmed in the attack.

== 2005 ==
Year	Victim(s)	Location of body or bodies	Notes
January 2005	Benjamin Onwuka	Attacked in North Kensington, London, died in hospital	24-year-old Onwuka was shot in the head in Maxilla Walk, North Kensington, on 2 January 2005. Four arrests of men in London and Surrey took place and a reward of £10,000 was offered, but the case is still unsolved.
January 2005	Khang Tho Nguyen	Wembley, London	42-year-old Nguyen was stabbed in the neck about two weeks before being found dead on 15 January 2005 at a house that was used as a cannabis factory. The Vietnamese victim did not reside at the property but was believed to have had some involvement in the drug's cultivation there.
January 2005	Sher "Lenny" Afzal	Reading, Berkshire	38-year-old Afzal, a drug dealer, died three days after being wounded in a drive-by shooting at Cemetery Junction, Reading, on 14 January 2005. Two men faced two trials for his murder, with the final trial coming to an end in July 2008 when no evidence was offered by the prosecution and the jury was ordered by the judge to find both suspects not guilty. The judge voiced concerns over the disclosure process, too.
January 2005	Junior Edwards	Archway, London	30-year-old Edwards died at Whittington Hospital, Archway, on 18 January 2005 about an hour after being found injured in nearby Spears Road following a fight with two men described as being in the 20–30 age bracket. A single stab wound was the cause of his death, but he had also been punched and knocked to the ground.
January 2005	Robert McCartney	Belfast, Northern Ireland	On 30 January 2005, 33-year-old McCartney and a friend were followed outside from a bar in Belfast city centre and then beaten and stabbed in Market Street after a fight inside the establishment. McCartney died nine hours later, but his friend survived. Allegations have been made, particularly by relatives of McCartney, that members of the IRA were involved in both the murder and a subsequent cover-up.
February 2005	Justin Bernier	Clapham, London	20-year-old Bernier was found stabbed to death at his flat in Clapham Road, Clapham, on Monday 21 February 2005. A police appeal three days later stressed the importance of speaking to those who had been in the area late the previous Saturday or early on the Sunday that followed.
March 2005	Bruno Hrela	Enfield, London	33-year-old Hrela was shot twice in the head and discovered next to his Mercedes in Cedar Avenue, Enfield, on 5 March 2005. He was thought to have been murdered in a contract killing and to have been involved in the sale of stolen goods.
March 2005	Shaun Stanislas	Stonebridge, London	24-year-old Stanislas was shot dead in Stonebridge on 22 March 2005. The attack was said to have been carried out because he was rumoured to have been responsible for the non-fatal shooting of a man the previous month. A man was sentenced to a minimum of 25 years in prison in September 2007 for being complicit in the fatal July 2006 shooting of a suspect in Stanislas's murder.
March 2005	Orville Davidson	New Cross, London	Purley resident Davidson, 25, was found in Knoyle Street, New Cross, on 27 March 2005 (Easter Sunday) after being shot through the heart. His death preceded by four months the murder of his friend Peter Buahin – another unsolved case.
April 2005	Wayne Kelly	West Hendon, London	21-year-old Kelly fell and hit his head outside the Harp pub in West Hendon on 10 April 2005 after being punched by a bouncer. He fell as he was being chased following his intervention in an argument between bouncers and two other men, and although three men were later arrested on suspicion of his murder, there was not enough evidence to try any of them.
April 2005	Chamlong Allen	Notting Hill, London	Allen was found dead with multiple stab wounds in a lockup garage on Lonsdale Mews on 27 April 2005. The garage was close to the site of Portobello Market, where the 49-year-old Thai woman had sold food from a stall for a living. Allen's estranged husband, a retired actor who she had told people had abused her and whom she had been fighting for custody of their three daughters, was charged with her murder within days of the crime coming to the attention of the police, but he was acquitted at the Old Bailey after prosecutors had ceased to offer evidence.
May 2005	Vikki Preston and Rhona Schofield	Salford, Greater Manchester	Preston and Schofield, both 19, were best friends who were killed by toxic fumes from a fire in the terraced house where they were staying in the early hours of 10 May 2005. The property was on King Street, Higher Broughton, Salford, and the victims were in an upstairs bedroom when the blaze was triggered by furniture being lit downstairs at around 4:00 a.m. Preston and another woman had a violent row the day before and that woman was said to have later uttered a threat against the pair, but she denied any role in the blaze when she attended their inquest hearing.
June 2005	June Thrussell	Dagenham, London	56-year-old Thrussell was found strangled to death in her home on Friday 17 June 2005 after one of her colleagues had notified the police that she had not turned up for her work as a secretary since Tuesday of that week. A man who had been convicted in 1976 of a murder committed the year before was cleared of Thrussell's murder but went back to prison despite that because there were concerns that he was still a danger to others.
June 2005	Troy Robinson	Stonebridge, London	A group of people were standing outside James Dudson Court in Wyborne Way, Stonebridge, at around 9:45 p.m. on 19 June 2005 when one or more men got out of a car that had just pulled up and randomly fired bullets at them. 19-year-old Robinson was shot in the chest and pronounced dead on arrival at a hospital nearby; two other men in their late teens received gunshot wounds to their legs and survived. A man was paralysed from the neck down a year later in a shooting suspected to have been a revenge attack for Robinson's murder.
June 2005	Bill Marney	Crayford, London	39-year-old Marney was shot outside his home in Mill Place, Crayford, on 23 June 2005 by a man in a dark hatchback that was probably a Rover 45 or a Peugeot. There was another man in the vehicle besides the shooter.
July 2005	Peter Buahin	New Cross, London	Buahin, 23, was shot in the head on 25 July 2005 after being approached by two men as he sat on his bicycle in Woodpecker Road, New Cross. The murder happened after that of Orville Davidson – a friend of his – in March 2005, and both remain unsolved.
July/August 2005	Newton Thompson	Paddington, London	61-year-old Thompson, an Australian tourist, was found battered to death in his room at the Comfort Inn hotel, Paddington, on 1 August 2005. Property belonging to him had been taken, too. Because a child sex abuser who was also from Australia and had also recently come to the UK bore a strong resemblance to Thompson, it was believed that the murder might have been a case of mistaken identity.
August 2005	Lucy Hargreaves	Liverpool	Three masked men armed with a sawn-off shotgun forced their way into 22-year-old Hargreaves's house on Lambourne Road, Walton, on 3 August 2005 while she was asleep on the living room sofa. She was then shot twice in the abdomen and once in the head at point-blank range before petrol was poured at various locations downstairs and ignited. Hargreaves's boyfriend, who it is thought might have been the intended target, escaped from the burning property by jumping with the couple's youngest daughter from an upstairs window. They were asleep upstairs when the perpetrators gained access.
August 2005	James Tomlin	Shipley, West Yorkshire	36-year-old Tomlin went into cardiac arrest and died during the early hours of 15 August 2005 after jumping from a bedroom window at his home in Windhill, Shipley, to escape a fire that began when kerosene was poured through the letterbox and ignited. Also inside the property were his pregnant 26-year-old partner and their two sons, who all escaped and survived. Because the arson attack was a seemingly motiveless crime against a family with no criminal ties, detectives considered it a possibility that the wrong house was targeted.
September 2005	Kenneth Nunn	Whittlesford, Cambridgeshire	85-year-old Nunn died in an apparent arson attack on his home in Whittlesford on the night of 6–7 September 2005. A detective chief inspector speaking a year after the fire said he could not think of a motive for starting it.
September 2005	Elsie Hughes	Attacked in Abermorddu, Flintshire, died in hospital in Wrexham	90-year-old Hughes was found injured at her home on Hawarden Road, Caergwrle, at 9:00 p.m. on 8 September 2005. She died of her injuries early the following day in Wrexham Maelor Hospital. It is believed that Hughes was murdered by intruders who stole £200.
September 2005	Anne Marie Foy	Liverpool	46-year-old Foy was killed at around 5:30 a.m. on 15 September 2005. Her body was found in bushes at the junction of Crown Street and West Derby Street in Liverpool; she had been battered to death. Foy was a sex worker and a man stood trial for her murder in 2012 but was found not guilty.
September/October 2005	George Willis	Peckham, London	Willis's bus pass and flying jacket appeared to have been taken from his Torridge Gardens home when he was discovered tied up and dead from head injuries there on 6 October 2005. He was last seen alive eight days previously, arguing on his doorstep with a man thought to have been in his 20s. It came to be suspected that the murder of 84-year-old Willis, a bachelor who often tried to make friends by giving money to strangers, might have been a homophobic crime carried out by people who assumed that being a lifelong unmarried man meant he was gay.
October 2005	Anthony Cavanagh	Liverpool	22-year-old Cavanagh was knocked to the ground in a single punch on Saturday 24 September 2005 after bumping into another man in a bar in central Liverpool earlier in the night, and his death occurred in hospital 11 days later. An arrest over Cavanagh's murder was made in 2015, but the arrested man was not charged.
October 2005	Nora Tait	Doncaster, South Yorkshire	69-year-old Tait was bludgeoned at her home in Stone Close Avenue, Hexthorpe, Doncaster, on 12 October 2005. She was murdered shortly after she had bought fish and chips, which were untouched on her dining table when a friend found her dead the following day. Police made a new appeal for information on the 10th anniversary of Tait's murder in 2015.
October 2005	Alexandre Marques	Luton, Bedfordshire	Marques, 61, was last seen at his home in Clanricarde Gardens, Notting Hill, London, on Sunday 16 October 2005. His remains were found on 2 January 2006 on the grass verge of Woodside Road, Luton. CCTV images showed a man using Marques's bank card in west and northwest London shortly after his disappearance. In January 2021, police reported that they had a new forensic lead and that a £20,000 reward was still available.
October 2005	Isaiah Young-Sam	Birmingham	23-year-old Young-Sam and three companions were in a backstreet in Lozells on 22 October 2005 when a group of Asian men confronted them and one of them fatally stabbed him in the chest. Race riots were going on in the area at the time, triggered by an unsubstantiated rumour that Asians had gang-raped a black girl. Two trials resulted in four convictions for Young-Sam's murder, but each conviction was overturned by April 2011.
November 2005	Andrea Daly	Southend, Essex	40-year-old Daly died when her house on Rochford Road, Southend, was set alight at nighttime on 10 November 2005. Her sons, who were aged 17 and 20, managed to escape from the smoke and flames by jumping from a first-floor window. Police could not find a motive.
November 2005	Michael Grey	Newcastle	45-year-old care worker Grey was walking to the home of an elderly person he cared for on 11 November 2005 when he was attacked on Ellesmere Road in Newcastle's West End at around 8:00 p.m. His wallet was taken during the attack. Grey managed to get to his feet afterwards and sought treatment at Newcastle General Hospital, but he fell into a coma and died 10 days later. Three people were charged with theft, but no one was charged with his murder.
December 2005	Douglas Yogarasa	Kingsbury, London	27-year-old Yogarasa was shot in Queensbury Road, Kingsbury, on 11 December 2005, and a white van was seen heading away from the scene. Although no one was caught for Yogarasa's murder, police investigating it uncovered a racket involving people's bank accounts being plundered, and arrested three people who would go on to be convicted at Harrow Crown Court.
December 2005	Kamila Garsztka	Bedford	Garsztka was 26 when she went missing in mid-December 2005. Her body was found by canoeists in Priory Lake, Bedford, in January 2006. Garsztka's boyfriend was found guilty of her murder in 2007, but his conviction was quashed in 2009 and he went on to win a libel action against Bedfordshire Police in 2012, being awarded £125,000.
December 2005	Hallam Tennyson	Highgate, London	85-year-old Tennyson, a retired author and former BBC employee, was stabbed to death in his home in Highgate on 21 December 2005 shortly after being filmed by CCTV at two London tube stations. He was the great-grandson of Alfred, Lord Tennyson, a 19th-century poet laureate.

== 2006 ==
Year	Victim(s)	Location of body or bodies	Notes
January 2006	Barrington Williams-Samuels	Clapton, London	19-year-old Williams-Samuels was shot and killed in his car outside the Palace Pavilion, a nightclub on Lower Clapton Road, early on Monday 2 January 2006. Not long before that incident, he and one of the car's two passengers (a male friend; the other was Williams-Samuels's sister) had tried unsuccessfully to get into the club, and an altercation with someone at the entrance is said to have occurred. A court acquitted a man of murder in 2008 after the evidence against him was found to be insufficient.
January 2006	Ralph Platten	Attacked in Sutton, Norfolk, died at the Norfolk and Norwich Hospital	A group of men pushed past the 95-year-old war veteran and beat him when he opened his front door on 3 January 2006; he died of heart failure the next day. Five people charged in relation to the incident did not go to court over it because the Crown Prosecution Service found that there was not enough evidence to link any of them to it.
January 2006	Subramaniam Sivakumar	Willesden, London	Likely the victim of a ritual killing, 44-year-old Sivakumar was found dead in his shop with a shoelace around his neck and wounds behind one of his ears on 5 January 2006.
January 2006	Richard Zephaniah	Basildon, Essex	39-year-old Zephaniah was stabbed once in the chest outside his flat in Bockingham Green, Basildon, on 6 January 2006. Three men were arrested on suspicion of his murder and a file was sent to the Crown Prosecution Service in 2007, but the CPS ruled that there was insufficient evidence for a trial.
January 2006	Joyce Sutton	Skewen, Wales	Sutton, 65, was found dead in her bed at her home in Winifred Road, Skewen, on 11 January 2006. She had been beaten to death. Sutton's partner stood trial for her murder in 2008 but was found not guilty.
January 2006	Rebwar Samin	Leicester	Samin, 21, was stabbed in Clyde Street, Leicester, at around 5:00 p.m. on 11 January 2006 when he and another man were involved in a confrontation with two men that had escalated. Police suspected early on in their investigation into his murder that the two people they most wanted to speak to about it (men who were Iraqi nationals, as was Samin) did not live in Leicestershire any longer.
January 2006	Sukhwinder Singh	Epsom, Surrey	27-year-old Singh was strangled and his body left in the car park of Epsom Downs Racecourse, where it was found on the morning of 21 January 2006. A 36-year-old man was arrested in Barcelona in October 2010 and released on bail while inquiries continued.
February 2006	Mehar Singh Kataria	East Ham, London	On 3 February 2006, the 68-year-old widower was bludgeoned to death and then repeatedly stabbed at his house on Byron Avenue, East Ham, and an envelope containing approximately £200 was stolen. Because he was careful about whom he let in there and no signs of forced entry were found, police thought there was a strong possibility that he knew his attacker(s).
March 2006	Jamie Campbell	Glasgow	Four men were convicted in 2022 of the April 2018 gun murder of Kenneth Reilly in Glasgow's Maryhill area, but one of them was acquitted at the same trial of shooting dead 47-year-old Campbell in the Drumchapel area of the city on 4 March 2006. Lawyers acting for the man acquitted of this offence claimed that another murdered man – gangster Kevin Carroll, who died in 2010 – was Campbell's killer. Campbell and his son were acquitted in 2004 over the January 2003 murder of Kevin Clark. At that trial, the son was accused of killing Clark and Campbell was accused of cutting up the son's football top and tracksuit bottoms.
March 2006	Jordan Jackson and Leyla Djemal-Northcott	Upper Norwood, London	20-year-old Jackson and 21-year-old Djemal-Northcott, Jackson's girlfriend, were shot dead in their flat in Menlo Gardens, Upper Norwood, on 7 March 2006 when Jackson, who was said to have stolen £5,000 from a violent drug dealer, answered the door to two men wearing ski masks. Jackson's brother was shot too but survived, and the girlfriend of this brother, who was likewise at the flat that day, hid from the gunmen and was not found by them. Four men were charged with murder in 2011. Two of the suspects were identical twins, with one alleged to have been one of the shooters and the other to have acted as a lookout, and the police tried to train witnesses to tell them apart by creating sets of virtual twins for those witnesses to study – a measure that a judge found "intelligent and imaginative" but "ultimately deficient", prompting him to throw the case out.
March 2006	Carlton Alveranga and Richard Austin	Salford, Greater Manchester	Alveranga, 20, and Austin, 19, were recruited to murder David Totton, and entered Salford's Brass Handles pub on Sunday 12 March 2006 to carry out their task. Although Totton was shot, he survived. His assailants were then disarmed and shot dead with their own guns. Alveranga and Austin's clients were convicted of conspiracy to murder in 2007, but the killer or killers of their would-be hitmen remain unidentified.
March 2006	Michael Shipton	Sheering, Essex	61-year-old Shipton, known as Joe, was found dead at his home in The Plashets, Sheering, on 25 March 2006. He had died from head injuries, and there was no sign of forced entry to the house.
April 2006	Fabian Ricketts	Attacked in Battersea, London, died in hospital	On 17 April 2006 (Easter Monday), 18-year-old Ricketts was shot in the chest at The Battersea Bar in York Road after a friend of his made a signal to someone he thought he knew and the signal was mistaken for a gun gesture. Three men were put on trial, but the judge dismissed the case on the grounds of shortage of evidence. The shooting was witnessed by James Andre Smartt-Ford, a 16-year-old who was himself shot dead in February 2007; his murder also remains unsolved.
April/May 2006	Philip Salmon	Farnborough, Hampshire	41-year-old Salmon disappeared at the end of April 2006 and his burnt body was discovered on a golf course on 16 June. A post mortem failed to establish a cause of death but did find that a flammable liquid was used to help start the fire.
May 2006	Aaron Watson	Leeds	Watson, 27, was shot in the Creation nightclub on Cookridge Street, Leeds, on 1 May 2006, and died from his injuries in hospital nine days later. Police believed his killers were from the Manchester area.
May 2006	Luke Durbin	Body not found	19-year-old Durbin left an Ipswich nightclub on his own in the early hours of Friday 12 May 2006 when he had become separated from a friend, and later tried – unsuccessfully because he did not have any money on him – to get a taxi back to his home in the Suffolk village of Hollesley. CCTV footage showed him walking towards a bus station in Ipswich town centre at around 4:00 a.m., but his movements after then are a mystery. In 2012, two men aged 41 and 26 were arrested on suspicion of being connected with Durbin's murder, but neither was charged. In 2020, it was disclosed that Durbin may have been in debt to drug dealers.
June 2006	Neil Davies	Neath, Wales	27-year-old Davies was stabbed in the chest during a barbecue at his home on Caederwen Road, Neath, on 25 June 2006. His wife stood trial for his murder in 2007 but was found not guilty.
July 2006	Ernest Gifford	Manchester	45-year-old Gifford, a small-time drug dealer, was shot in the thigh by one of three masked men during a robbery bid at his house in Moss Side, Manchester, on 4 July 2006. A man convicted of murder in 2007 was acquitted at a 2011 retrial after arguing that the presence of his DNA on a glove print in the house might have been due to someone borrowing his gloves, and that footprints there that matched the tread of a pair of trainers he owned could not have been his because he did not buy the trainers until after the killing.
July 2006	Jim Stanton	Liverpool	At around 6:00 p.m. on Monday 24 July 2006, two armed men in balaclavas went into Aintree Commercial Vehicles, Ormskirk Road, Aintree, and shot 58-year-old Stanton, an office worker, in the head and back as he sat at his desk. Merseyside Police suspect that he might not have been the intended target of the attack and have offered a £20,000 reward for information leading to the offenders' convictions.
July 2006	Beata Bryl	Wooburn, Buckinghamshire	23-year-old Bryl was captured on CCTV at Leytonstone tube station, east London, on 28 July 2006. Her burnt remains were found by a motorist 50 miles away in woodland near Hedsor Lane, Wooburn, Buckinghamshire, the following day. She had been bludgeoned to death. Bryl was originally from Poland and came to the UK in 2003. Her mother believed her daughter was in an unhappy relationship with an older, controlling man.
August 2006	Roy Helm	Oxford	40-year-old Helm, a window cleaner, suffered rib fractures and a damaged liver before being found lifeless in his flat on 12 August 2006. A man on trial in 2007 was alleged to have attacked Helm for calling his girlfriend – who was also Helm's ex-girlfriend – a name, but a defence lawyer said that the girlfriend's description of the assault was at odds with the victim's fatal injuries and that she was the one who inflicted them. The man was acquitted and his girlfriend was not charged with anything in relation to Helm's death.
August 2006	George "Goofy" Docherty	Glasgow	46-year-old Docherty, a career criminal once sentenced to seven years in prison for his role in an attempted murder, was repeatedly run over and then stabbed multiple times in a daytime attack in Glasgow's Glenshee Street on 28 August 2006.
September 2006	Jessie James	Manchester	15-year-old James was shot dead in Broadfield Park, Moss Side, in the early hours of 9 September 2006 by a person or people who had been hiding in the bushes. It is believed his murder may have been a case of mistaken identity. Police have been concerned about the lack of witnesses coming forward, possibly due to fear of the repercussions.
September 2006	Duncan Frame	Thamesmead, London	52-year-old Frame suffered head injuries and heart failure after getting caught up in a nighttime brawl at the Cutty Sark pub in Thamesmead on Saturday 9 September 2006. Fans of Tottenham Hotspur F.C. and Charlton Athletic F.C. had gathered there, but the latter of these clubs later issued a statement denying that the brawl was to do with football.
September 2006	Dean Myles	Bristol	19-year-old Myles was shot in a Bristol nightclub during a visit to the city from London on Saturday 16 September 2006. Four men faced murder charges at trial, and one of them was acquitted. Because the jury could not reach a verdict on any of the other three, a retrial was sought, but the case against them ended up being dropped because the Court of Appeal would not permit statements from anonymous witnesses to be read out in court in their absence.
September 2006	Jason Gale-Bent	Attacked in New Cross, London, died in hospital	Gale-Bent, 29, was outside with his brother and a friend on 17 September 2006 when a gang of youths who were not known to them approached and attacked him. As well as being beaten, he was hit with an airgun pellet and received two stab wounds, one of which penetrated his heart and was the fatal injury. Police considered the incident to be possibly linked to one involving a man being chased and stabbed in Deptford later on the same day.
September 2006	Dean Jeffery	Bristol	39-year-old Jeffery died on 28 September 2006 after being attacked a week earlier as he walked back to his home near Fishponds Road, Bristol, from a trip to a local shop.
October 2006	Antoine Smith	Clapham, London	24-year-old Smith was shot by two youths on bicycles near a pizza takeaway in Clapham on 20 October 2006. It was thought to have been a gangland slaying.
October 2006	David Lees	Manchester	A silver Vauxhall Vectra was deliberately driven into 23-year-old Lees in Middleton Road, Prestwich, on the night of 27/28 October 2006 after an altercation between his group and a group of Asian men at a petrol station on that road. Two men were arrested on suspicion of murder in 2016.
October 2006	Jerome Vassell	Haringey, London	19-year-old Vassell was shot in the head as he sat in a car in the car park of the West Indian Cultural Centre, Clarendon Road, Haringey, on 28 October 2006. He initially survived the attack and was treated in hospital, but was left with brain damage and partial paralysis. In March 2007 Vassell was discharged, but on 27 December 2007 he collapsed at his home in Harringay Road and died. Vassell's case then became a murder one and the Metropolitan Police offered a £20,000 reward to anyone who had information leading to a conviction.
November 2006	Jamail Newton	Camberwell, London	19-year-old Newton was shot several times whilst outside a Camberwell Green nightclub with friends on 1 November 2006.
November 2006	Meshack Bernard-Brown	Birmingham	Bernard-Brown was shot to death in a cul-de-sac off Melbourne Avenue, Lozells, Birmingham, on 13 November 2006 (his 20th birthday). Appeal judges substituted three violent disorder convictions for murder convictions in 2010 because they had serious doubts about the appellants' involvement in the shooting on the basis of joint enterprise. Two of the three appellants were the brother and cousin of two Asian youths stabbed by black youths earlier on 13 November 2006, and Bernard-Brown was said to have been shot at random for revenge because he happened to be black too. The person generally believed to have been the one who fired the gun fled to Pakistan, but one witness's description suggests the gunman might have been someone taller than the main suspect and dressed differently from him.
November 2006	Christopher Elliott	Leeds	39-year-old Elliott's burnt body was found near Roundhay Road, Leeds, on 20 November 2006 after he was taken from his Bramley flat and battered to death. Four men were charged with but not convicted of his murder.
December 2006	Jimoh Plunkett	Ipswich, Suffolk	24-year-old Plunkett was shot in the chest in an Ipswich nightclub and pronounced dead at the town's main hospital on Saturday 9 December 2006. In October 2008, a man who had become one of two prime suspects in the killing – fellow Londoner Errol Davis – died in very similar circumstances in another murder that has not been solved.

== 2007 ==
Year	Victim(s)	Location of body or bodies	Notes
January 2007	Paul Kelly	Bath, Somerset	Following an argument that had started in a pub and continued in an adjoining alley during the early hours of New Year's Day, 32-year-old Kelly was hit over the head with a mobile phone and then knifed. Kelly fell, hitting his head on a concrete bollard, and was kicked whilst he lay on the ground. Nathan Dixon was charged with his murder but later acquitted in court.
January 2007	Atiyebi Omuaru	Barking, London	25-year-old Omuaru went to a garage on River Road, Barking, to pick up his serviced car on 2 January 2007 and was shot dead in the reception after diving behind the counter following earlier shots and a struggle. The dark Vauxhall Omega saloon in which the two culprits left had arrived at the garage nearly two hours before Omuaru did.
January 2007	Robert Pride-McLeod	Harrogate, North Yorkshire	Pride-McLeod's body was found in the cellar of a homeless hostel on 21 January 2007 following a severe assault on the 49-year-old. The assault probably took place within a few days of his arrival at the hostel on 12 January.
January 2007	Dean Tully	Brentford, London	37-year-old Tully died and another man and a Staffordshire bull terrier were wounded when two men burst into a flat in Brentford and sprayed it with bullets from a submachine gun on 25 January 2007. A nearby CCTV camera captured the gunmen leaving the scene, but the footage was of very poor quality. The shooting was believed to have been part of a turf war between an established drug-dealing gang and one trying to move in on its territory. Tully's background suggested he was not an intended target but was simply in the wrong place at the wrong time.
January 2007	John Iveson	Body not found	The 36-year-old's wife was pregnant with his fifth child when he vanished from Nantwich, Cheshire, on 30 January 2007, and his disappearance is being treated as murder. In April 2012, two men were found not guilty of Iveson's murder; the trial heard that he owed almost £250,000 to his brother-in-law.
February 2007	James Andre Smartt-Ford	London	At approximately 10:55 p.m. on 3 February 2007, the Metropolitan Police received a call about a shooting at an ice-skating rink known as Streatham Ice Arena. A youth had shot 17-year-old Smartt-Ford, who then staggered onto the ice from the area at the bottom of a stairway and collapsed. He died at around midnight in hospital. Although there were multiple witnesses, the killer has not been identified.
February 2007	Chamberlain Igwemba	Peckham, London	Drug baron Igwemba, 47, and his accountant were shot at a flat on Clayton Road in Peckham on 4 February 2007, but the accountant survived. Two Jamaican men were acquitted.
February 2007	Sajid Saddique	Body not found	32-year-old Saddique, a father-of-three, met a friend in the car park of an Asda supermarket in Shipley, West Yorkshire, on 14 February 2007 and was never seen again. He was declared dead in 2014 and his disappearance began to be treated as murder later that same year. Saddique had been involved in disputes over money at the time of his disappearance and the investigation has seen two men arrested but not charged. A second inquest into his death in December 2020 ruled that he had been unlawfully killed, and the murder investigation remains ongoing.
February 2007	Billy Cox	Clapham, London	Cox's 13-year-old sister arrived home from school and found the 15-year-old dying from bullet wounds in his bedroom on 14 February 2007. Their home was in Fenwick Place, Clapham, and no evidence of anyone having broken and entered the property was discovered. Two men were arrested over Cox's death in 2019.
March 2007	Terry McSpadden	Body not found	24-year-old McSpadden told people prior to vanishing on 2 March 2007 that he feared he was going to be murdered because he had recently woken up on the sofa in a friend's cottage to find himself encased in industrial-style cling film before being rescued from suffocation by his friend coming home and cutting through the material. The cottage was in Elm, a village on the Cambridgeshire/Norfolk border. McSpadden's friend was charged with murder in November 2012, but a judge at Norwich Crown Court ruled that the evidence pointing towards his guilt was too inadequate for proceedings against him to continue.
March 2007	Tyno Kavuala	College Park, London	Kavuala, a 20-year-old Kilburn man, was shot in his car near the northern end of Scrubs Lane, College Park, on 4 March 2007. The killing appeared to have been a gangland crime. A 22-year-old man murdered in London in May 2010 – Daniel Smith – was thought to have been targeted because he looked like Kavuala's suspected assailant.
March 2007	Adam Regis	Plaistow, London	15-year-old Regis was attacked in Plaistow, sustaining a stab wound in the process, as he walked home from a visit to the cinema with his girlfriend and friends on 17 March 2007. The weapon went through his right arm and nicked his aorta, and no motive has been established.
March 2007	Callum Bland	Wellingborough, Northamptonshire	Three-year-old Bland was killed on 19 March 2007 by smoke from a fire that had spread to the interior of his home in Wellingborough after being started in a wheelie bin next to one of the property's external doors. His mother, her partner and three other children escaped. Two boys in their mid-teens were apprehended and released four years later.
March 2007	Mustapha Charkaui	Attacked in Aylesbury, Buckinghamshire, later died in hospital in Oxford	Charkaui, 57, and his wife were attacked at their home in Dunsham Lane on 12 March 2007. Two men broke in and beat them with a spade. The wife survived, but Charkaui died of his injuries on 23 March. Police were unable to establish a motive.
April 2007	Robert Keetley	Nottingham	37-year-old Keetley's body was recovered from the River Trent on 8 May 2007 after he had disappeared on 29 April. His wallet, mobile phone and gold chain were missing, and it is believed that he either ended up in the river while being pursued by robbers or was pushed into it.
May 2007	Lavinia Branch	Murrow, Cambridgeshire	71-year-old Lavinia Branch and her 77-year-old husband were beaten with a blunt object at their caravan on 12 May 2007 before it was set on fire with them still inside. A critically injured Mr Branch then emerged from the caravan, which was on a travellers' site in the village of Murrow. Their son was charged with the murder of his mother and the attempted murder of his father, but he protested his innocence and was found not guilty at a hearing where his father claimed via TV link that he had recollections of him attacking them after asking Mrs Branch for money and not being given any by her.
June 2007	Gary Morton	Attacked in Hamilton, died in hospital in East Kilbride (both in South Lanarkshire)	On 1 June 2007, as the time approached midnight, 17-year-old Morton was fatally attacked after going to the assistance of his brother because a fight was underway in the car park of a bar on Swisscot Avenue, Hamilton. About 10 males participated in the fight, and some of them were guests at an 18th birthday party taking place at the bar. A badly injured 29-year-old man survived.
June 2007	Ashley Dighton	Ashford, Kent	19-year-old Dighton was last seen at Sainsbury's supermarket on Simone Weil Avenue, Ashford, on 11 June 2007. His body was found a month later, buried beneath branches in woodland close to the supermarket. He had been decapitated. Dighton's father made an appeal for new information on the 11th anniversary of his son's murder.
June 2007	Ben Hitchcock	Attacked in Beckenham, London, died in hospital	16-year-old Hitchcock died from a stab wound to the back on 24 June 2007, having sustained the wound after being surrounded by members of a rival gang in Southend Road, Beckenham, the previous day. Hitchcock and other members of his gang had earlier tried to gatecrash a party attended by people belonging to the rival gang, leading to tension which escalated before culminating in the stabbing. Four youths were acquitted of murder in 2009.
June 2007	Abu Shahin	Ilford, London	18-year-old Shahin was stabbed in an attack by two men in Ramsgill Drive, Ilford, during the early hours of 26 June 2007. He was from nearby Manor Park. A man was charged with murder, but the Crown Prosecution Service abandoned the case.
July 2007	John Devine	Glasgow	45-year-old Devine was murdered in Cowlairs Park, Glasgow. Although the crime likely took place on 10 July 2007, the police did not know about it until 16 July, when his body was found in bushes in that park. Devine's dog is thought to have stayed with the body for a few days before returning home and being taken in by a neighbour.
July 2007	Albert "Taffy" Bishop	Ashford, Kent	74-year-old Bishop died at William Harvey Hospital, Ashford, on 13 July 2007 after being beaten with a hammer when he entered his home in Hythe Road on 18 March. He died from a fractured femur sustained in a fall at the property on 30 June, and a Home Office pathologist ruled that because the fall was a result of the hammer attack, his death should be treated as murder.
July 2007	Abukar Mahamud	Stockwell, London	16-year-old Mahamud died from a gunshot wound to the neck on the Stockwell Gardens estate when youths had been chasing him on bicycles on 26 July 2007. A 20-year-old had a murder charge against him dropped two months later.
July 2007	Xiong Zhang	Attacked in Barking, London, died in hospital	Zhang, a 33-year-old street seller, was assaulted and had his DVDs stolen before two plain-clothes police officers found him on a towpath in Barking on 19 July 2007. He was treated in hospital for a brain injury but died on 27 July.
August 2007	Ryan Woolley	Liverpool	20-year-old Woolley was shot five times in Wavertree, Liverpool, on 11 August 2007. A trial of three men took place in 2009, but a High Court judge acquitted them after finding there to be practically no evidence against the alleged gunman, noting too that the cases against the other two hinged on that man's suspected role. Woolley's murder was believed to have been a gangland hit because of his brother's part in the underworld killing of Michael Wright in December 2006.
August 2007	Ray Shearwood	Body not found	36-year-old Shearwood's disappearance on 19 August 2007 may have been gang-related and connected to a drug debt. A onetime boxer and convicted money launderer, he was last seen walking towards a Volkswagen Golf parked outside a pub in Maghull, Merseyside.
August 2007	Mohammed Ahmed	Manor Park, London	17-year-old Ahmed was stabbed to death in Chesterford Road, Manor Park, at around 11:30 p.m. on 30 August 2007. A man whose home was in the area said he heard shouting and swearing before looking out of a window and seeing three males running.
September 2007	Moses Ssendawula	Camberwell, London	41-year-old Ssendawula was shot in the back and shoulder whilst walking through Burgess Park, Camberwell, in the early hours of 8 September 2007. He was a voluntary worker and it appeared that the slaying was a case of mistaken identity.
September 2007	Edvin Johnson	Camberwell, London	19-year-old Johnson was stabbed in the groin when five youths attacked him and a friend in the stairwell of a block of flats on 16 September 2007. It is not believed that either of them was an intended target.
September 2007	Daniel Denis	Attacked in Acton, London, died in hospital	26-year-old Denis died in Hammersmith's Charing Cross Hospital a few hours after being shot from a car as he drove his own along Acton's Brassie Avenue at night on 18 September 2007. Five people were arrested and released.
October 2007	Philip Poru	Attacked in Plumstead, London, died in hospital	18-year-old Poru was shot in a parked car in Long Walk, Plumstead, on 14 October 2007 after two men approached it and were told that its occupants were from Peckham. Another person in the vehicle was shot as well, but he recovered. Poru was a Kingston University student and did not appear to have been a member of any gang. CCTV captured two suspects in a nearby alleyway about 15 minutes before the shooting.
17 October 2007	Jonathan Matondo	Sheffield	Matondo moved from the Democratic Republic of Congo to England at the age of six and was shot dead at 16 near a children's play area in Sheffield by someone presumed by police to have been from a rival postcode gang. A man formally accused of Matondo's murder was found not guilty at a second trial after the jury at his first one failed to reach a verdict.
November 2007	Colin Smith	Liverpool	Smith, cleared in 1993 of being complicit in a conspiracy to import a large amount of cocaine into Britain from Venezuela, was shot dead aged 40 outside a gym in Speke on 13 November 2007.
November 2007	Margaret Hawkins	Orpington, London	Following a burglary and an assault on 87-year-old Hawkins at her bungalow on Charterhouse Road, Orpington on 16 November 2007, the police started to class her as a murder victim when, after collapsing due to shock while telling officers about her ordeal, she died in hospital on 18 November. There were two perpetrators – both of whom were male and thought to be between 25 and 40 years of age. Hawkins's handbag was discovered under a tree at a garden centre in Chislehurst. It was handed to the police on Christmas Eve 2007, but the DNA found on it did not have any evidential value.
December 2007	Brendan Hamilton	Peckham, London	When 48-year-old Hamilton was discovered beaten to death outside a flat on 2 December 2007, it soon became apparent that the only possible culprits were two friends of his, an ex-girlfriend, and the ex-girlfriend's new boyfriend. Hamilton's ex-girlfriend claimed to have witnessed the two friends attacking him, while one of the friends claimed to have witnessed him being attacked by her current boyfriend. Of the four suspects, however, it was Hamilton's two friends alone who were tried for his murder, and both were found not guilty. (The younger defendant told the jury that he had a "gross dislike" of his co-accused and would not have teamed up with him to assault someone he considered a friend.)
December 2007	Michael Davis-Bingham	Wolverhampton, West Midlands	Canadian national Davis-Bingham, 43, was found dead from a stab wound at his home in Bowen Street, Parkfields, on 13 December 2007. A person who called at the house shortly after midnight that day was urged in a 2012 police appeal to get in contact with them. Davis-Bingham ran a property consultancy firm that was beset by financial difficulties in the months leading up to the stabbing, and numerous people lost a lot of money as a result of investing in his business ventures.
December 2007	David Nowak	Attacked in Stoke Newington, London, died in hospital	After two people were stabbed – allegedly by 16-year-old Nowak or a friend of his – during a fight at a community centre late on 15 December 2007, Nowak and his friend were pursued by up to 30 armed youths and stabbed as well, in Nowak's case in a nearby play area. The other wounded people all survived. Eleven youths were cleared of murder in February 2009; and in July, a 19-year-old suspected gang member was sentenced to seven years in youth detention for violent disorder and grievous bodily harm against Nowak's friend.
December 2007	Assar Tomlinson	Birmingham	33-year-old Tomlinson was shot in the heart outside a pub in Newtown, Birmingham, on 23 December 2007. The pub – the King of the Road – was run by him, and the crime took place after two women started arguing inside the building and he asked them to leave.
December 2007	Dipo Seweje	Walworth, London	20-year-old Seweje was fatally shot in a stairwell of a block of flats on 26 December 2007, and police found his body in a nearby communal garden the day after when investigating a report of the shooting. The gun used to kill the student was also used to kill ex-professional boxer James Oyebola five months previously.

== 2008 ==
Year	Victim(s)	Location of body or bodies	Notes
January 2008	Sarah Melia	Horwich, Lancashire	Melia, 34, was stabbed six times in the back at her home on Catherine Street West, Horwich, near Bolton, on 14 January 2008. Her body was found by her teenage daughter at the foot of the stairs. Melia's brother stood trial for her murder twice, but both trials collapsed and he was found not guilty.
January 2008	Halton McCollin	Manchester	20-year-old McCollin died in hospital on 22 January after he was shot in the head in a Chinese takeaway in Stretford when mistaken for a gang member. A reward of £50,000 is on offer for information resulting in a conviction.
February 2008	Louis Brathwaite	Manchester	16-year-old Brathwaite died 12 days after two bullets hit him when a gunman indiscriminately fired shots into a betting shop in Withington, Manchester. The gunman was driven away from the scene in a Volkswagen Golf.
February 2008	Steven Bates	Battersea, London	Three men in their 20s were acquitted of the murder of 36-year-old Bates, who was crushed between two vehicles and received four stab wounds in Tennyson Street, Battersea, on 14 February 2008. Two of the acquitted – one earlier cleared of the 2006 murder of Fabian Ricketts – were the sons of a woman who was having an affair with the victim at the time of his death.
February 2008	Ade Pukeliene	Mugged in Beckton, London, died in hospital	Pukeliene, a 57-year-old Lithuanian, fell to the ground and had her handbag stolen in a mugging that occurred after she finished a cleaning shift at a bank in Canary Wharf and caught a train home. She was found near her house in Emerald Close, Beckton, at dawn on 28 February 2008, and later died from head injuries at the Royal London Hospital in Whitechapel. Two suspects were seen on a scooter or motorcycle heading towards Jasper Road.
1 March 2008	David O'Leary	Lydden, Kent	A gunman fired two shots at O'Leary, a scaffolder aged 31, within moments of him returning to his Lydden home from a night out with his girlfriend, hitting him in the chest and neck. The crime had hallmarks of a professional killing, but a motive for it remains undetermined.
March 2008	Harun Khan	Tipton, West Midlands	Taxi driver Khan, 39, was shot dead outside his home in Tudor Street, Tipton, on 3 March 2008. Police have treated the crime as a suspected honour killing.
March 2008	Syed Mehdi	Attacked in Ilford, London, died in hospital	23-year-old Mehdi and a 37-year-old man were shot at Blue Ice, a bar on Cranbrook Road, while Mehdi was on duty as a doorman on 1 March 2008. The gunman approached and shot them after waiting for two females to enter the establishment, then ran off towards the High Street. Mehdi died four days later, but the 37-year-old survived.
March 2008	Clare Brown	Manchester	25-year-old Brown's brother discovered her strangled to death at her home in Miles Platting on 9 March 2008. Her former boyfriend was acquitted of her murder the following November.
March 2008	Nicholas Clarke	Attacked in Brixton, London, died in hospital	19-year-old Clarke, known as "Ratty", was shot in the head on the Myatt's Fields Estate in the early hours of 15 March 2008. He was with a group of friends, and the shot was fired from a distance.
March 2008	Nehemiah Bryce	Birmingham	Shots were fired at 27-year-old Bryce's car when he pulled up outside some flats in Newtown, Birmingham, on 16 March 2008 and was approached by a group of people. Unable to drive away from the area because another vehicle (with which his collided as he attempted to escape) was blocking his route, he got out of his car and was chased down an alley, where he was shot with a pistol and collapsed. Detectives found no motive but did think Bryce was specifically targeted.
April 2008	Matthew Demko	Ashtead, Surrey	25-year-old Demko was bludgeoned to death with a barbell on 4 April 2008. He died in the garage of the home of a friend who was later tried for murder, the prosecution claiming that the killing occurred because he did not have enough money to pay Demko what he owed him from drug dealing. The friend was found not guilty.
April 2008	Margaret Briers	Attacked in St Helens, died in hospital in Whiston (both in Merseyside)	82-year-old Briers was fatally injured by an intruder at her home in Caldbeck Grove, Carr Mill, on 30 March 2008. The intruder stole just £16. Briers was found 12 hours after the attack and died in hospital a week later.
May 2008	Kuldeep Sidhu	Birmingham	25-year-old Sidhu was found dead after a fire at her home on Glyn Farm Road, Quinton, Birmingham, on 14 May 2008. She was in the early stages of pregnancy at the time of her death. The scene had been staged to make it look like Sidhu had committed suicide, with a note purporting to have been written by her and a noose around her neck. In May 2010, a coroner ruled that she had been unlawfully killed by someone known to her.
May 2008	Joyce Cregeen	Epsom, Surrey	81-year-old Cregeen was found stabbed to death at her home in Sefton Road, Epsom, on 15 May 2008. A woman stood trial for her murder the following year but was found not guilty. In 2018 the case was reopened by the Surrey and Sussex major crime team to investigate new lines of enquiry.
May 2008	Victoria Couchman	St Leonards-on-Sea, East Sussex	The skull of 19-year-old single mother Couchman was found in Redgeland Wood on 13 October 2008. It had reportedly been photographed and played with by children. A detailed search uncovered a femur and pelvis. Couchman had been missing since mid-May 2008. Her father was charged but killed himself in prison two days before he was due to stand trial at Lewes Crown Court.
June 2008	Hameeda Begum and Alana Mian	Bolton, Greater Manchester	A wheelie bin outside a house in Great Lever, Bolton, was set on fire at night on 23 June 2008. The fire spread to a second wheelie bin and from there to a discarded refrigerator before flames from the burning appliance triggered a leak in the mains gas supply of the house, resulting in a blaze. Begum, a 71-year-old woman, died from the effects of the blaze about 90 minutes after it took hold, while Mian, her four-year-old granddaughter, died on 1 August. A local news source was later told by the head of Greater Manchester Police's cold case unit that he thought the crime was a "malicious, racist attack".
June 2008	Adam Chadwick	Leeds	When Chadwick, a 20-year-old father-of-one, was at his sister's house in Harehills, Leeds, on 24 June 2008, a woman knocked on the door and asked for "Michelle". The woman, described as being in her late 20s and around 5 feet 5 inches (1.65 m) tall with dark brown hair, dark eyes and olive skin, then knocked again, whereupon three men tried to force their way in. Chadwick was shot in the ensuing struggle, possibly in a case of mistaken identity, and died two days later in hospital. The male culprits were described as black, masked and wearing camouflage clothing. Nobody has been brought to justice for Chadwick's murder, despite a reconstruction on Crimewatch, extensive appeals and a £10,000 reward.
July 2008	Freddie Moody	Attacked in Stockwell, London, died in hospital	18-year-old Moody was stabbed by somebody during a group attack in Guildford Road on 17 July 2008. Moody had taken part in a water fight at Holland Park in Kensington that day, and a row was said to have broken out. Three men were convicted of violent disorder, but the actual killer's identity remains unknown.
July 2008	John Rouse	Hull, East Yorkshire	A former pub landlord from London was acquitted of the 45-year-old drug dealer's murder the year after his mother found him shot dead in his shower on 31 July 2008. A prosecutor at the trial argued that Rouse knew the culprit very well, felt comfortable with them, and was killed by them because they owed him money. No one else has been charged with the murder.
August 2008	Ezcekiel Ojo	Walworth, London	24-year-old Ojo was found unconscious in Penrose Street, Walworth, in the early hours of 22 August 2008. He had been shot in the chest in what later appeared to be a possible case of mistaken identity.
September 2008	Stephon Davidson	Birmingham	A Citroen Saxo travelling along Monument Road in Ladywood, Birmingham, on 5 August 2008 was shot at multiple times from a Toyota Avensis. One of the Citroen's three passengers was 19-year-old Davidson and a bullet hit him in the neck, as a result of which he died on 2 September from organ failure. The incident was believed to have stemmed from gangland tension.
September 2008	Paul Duckenfield	Body not found	41-year-old Duckenfield was last seen at the Palm Trees restaurant near Great Saling, near Braintree, Essex, on 15 September 2008. Although his body has not been found, police believe he was murdered on or around 16 September. Investigations revealed a possible link with the dealing of anabolic steroids.
September 2008	Lucan Gordon	Brixton, London	23-year-old Gordon was stabbed outside a club in Coldharbour Lane, Brixton, on 19 September 2008. A man arrived suddenly and stabbed the West Norwood resident once in the neck before fleeing on foot.
September 2008	Clive Enkel	Romford, Essex	53-year-old Enkel was beaten by men with baseball bats at the home he shared with his elderly father in Alderwood Drive, Abridge, Essex, on 25 September 2008. He died at Queen's Hospital, Romford, two days later. Police investigated a group of men who were knocking on doors looking for casual work. Two men were arrested but released without charge.
October 2008	Surjit Takhar	Telford, Shropshire	Takhar's remains were found by roadworkers at a motorway junction on the outskirts of Telford in 2015. He had not been seen since early October 2008 and had phoned the police days before going missing to report an unwanted person at his home in Oldbury, West Midlands. The 37-year-old delivery driver's death might have been to do with money he owed.
October 2008	Errol Davis	London	24-year-old Davis, a prime suspect in the murder of 24-year-old Jimoh Plunkett in Ipswich, died at the Royal London Hospital on Sunday 5 October 2008 about six hours after receiving a single shot to the head in the seOne nightclub on Weston Street, Southwark. A man tried at the Old Bailey in 2011 for Davis's murder and that in February 2009 of 25-year-old Larry Safie was acquitted of these crimes but jailed for another shooting.
October 2008	George Redmond	Glasgow	42-year-old Redmond and a close friend were struck by bullets in a drive-by shooting outside a bar in Glasgow city centre on 6 October 2008, but only Redmond died. Redmond was a gangland figure with violent acts attributed to him.
October 2008	Daniel King	Ditton, Kent	51-year-old King was shot four times at his house on Medina Road, Ditton, on 17 October 2008. The police investigation that followed probed the theory of a connection between this crime and one in November 2006 in which his lounge window was shot out.
October 2008	Ashley Kemete	Kennington, London	Kemete, a 20-year-old known to the police, was shot four times in White Hart Street, Kennington, on 17 October 2008 at around 9:10 p.m. after three men approached him on foot outside his house there.
November 2008	Nathan Douglas	Wandsworth, London	20-year-old Douglas was stabbed in the neck on 3 November 2008 after travelling to Lebanon Road in Wandsworth by car with friends and leaving the vehicle at around 11:15 p.m. to buy drugs. The Camberwell man's inquest heard that the police had two suspects but not enough evidence for the Crown Prosecution Service to put either on trial.
November 2008	Lea Brooke	Wakefield, West Yorkshire	81-year-old Brooke died when her home on Walton Lane, Wakefield, was set on fire on 10 November 2008. In a case which police believe was one of mistaken identity, white spirit was poured through the letterbox and set alight. Brooke's murder was featured on Crimewatch.
November 2008	Andrew Cresswell	Pluckley, Kent	51-year-old Creswell was found dead at a café on an industrial estate on 11 November 2008; the cause of death was a blow to the head. He was the owner of the café and police thought the assailant could have been there to commit burglary. Five people have been arrested but not charged over the murder of the aviation archaeologist, who also had a mobile home on that estate.
November 2008	Scott Buchanan	Tividale, West Midlands	23-year-old Buchanan was shot in his home in Callaghan Drive, Tividale, on 12 November 2008 after his mother had been assaulted on the doorstep by two men and then gone out of the house in order to call for help. Buchanan's mother later went to jail for money laundering and acquiring criminal property and his brother for possessing illegal drugs with intent to supply, but police are still unsure of a motive for the attacks.
December 2008	Andrew Cunningham	Earlsfield, London	On 10 December 2008, 52-year-old Cunningham, a convicted child sex offender, was found dead – stabbed and with his genitals mutilated – in his caravan outside the haulage yard where he worked. £6,000 in cash was missing from the caravan, but police thought the slaying might have been a vigilante attack. Despite over 500 witness statements and a £20,000 reward, the perpetrator has not been found.

== 2009 ==
Year	Victim(s)	Location of body or bodies	Notes
January 2009	Sean Finnan	Liverpool	22-year-old Finnan was struck with a metal bar and stabbed after encountering a gang in Barons Hey, Stockbridge Village, on 5 January 2009. He died four days later. Finnan had gone to the area to try to recover a stolen bicycle belonging to his brother.
January 2009	Molly Morgan	Harrow, London	81-year-old Morgan had her handbag snatched as she walked along Streatfield Road, Harrow, on 15 January 2009. She fell during the attack and hit her head, and died in hospital the following day. The handbag had contained nothing of value. Four men were arrested but released without charge. A £20,000 reward for information was offered in January 2019.
January 2009	Ryan Quinn	Portrush, County Antrim	14-year-old Quinn was assaulted and chased onto a railway line by a group of teenagers after an argument on 30 January 2009. His hand became trapped in a cattle grid near Dhu Varren and he was hit by a train. Two suspects were named in a police file, but the Public Prosecution Service said there was not enough evidence to charge either of them.
February 2009	David Currier	Bromsgrove, Worcestershire	An intruder who probably entered 35-year-old Currier's house with accomplices killed him there in the early hours of 7 February 2009 by stabbing him in the leg. The victim's six-year-old son was also in the property.
February 2009	Shawn Callum	Stonebridge, London	26-year-old Callum was shot dead in Stonebridge as he left a party at a primary school in the early hours of 8 February 2009. Two men were cleared of murder the following February at a trial where it was alleged that the incident was linked to a row involving the deceased and his cousin. One of the accused – a 22-year-old deliberately misidentified by a witness as the gunman, according to a defence lawyer – told the court that he was at the party but making a phone call when the weapon was discharged.
February 2009	Damion Blair	Attacked in Tottenham, London, died in hospital	26-year-old Blair was shot four times outside a Caribbean café on Tottenham High Road at around 1:15 a.m. on 13 February 2009. It was an incident that followed a heated argument between him and his assailant. Two men were charged with murder, but the charges were withdrawn ahead of trial.
February 2009	Rhys Davies	Cardiff	17-year-old Davies was involved in an altercation while shopping with a friend in St Mary Street, Cardiff, on 13 February 2009 at 6:40 p.m. He suffered head injuries and died the following day. Four men were arrested over Davies's murder but released without charge due to lack of evidence.
February 2009	Larry Safie	East Dulwich, London	25-year-old Safie was shot once in the back of the head whilst walking along Barry Road, East Dulwich, on 22 February 2009. His home was nearby. A man tried at the Old Bailey in 2011 for Safie's murder and that in October 2008 of 24-year-old Errol Davis was acquitted of these crimes but jailed for another shooting.
March 2009	AbdulKarim Boudiaf	Tottenham, London	18-year-old Boudiaf had plans to study law at the University of Northampton when he was shot on Broadwater Road, close to the Elmhurst Hotel in Tottenham, at 10:00 p.m. on 14 March 2009. A man stood trial for murder and two people were also tried for assisting an offender, but all three were acquitted in November 2009. In 2017, Boudiaf's family called for the case to be re-investigated with the support of the MP for Tottenham, David Lammy. He said that the case had "echoes" of the Stephen Lawrence case.
March 2009	Claudia Lawrence	Body not found	Although her body has never been found, North Yorkshire Police are treating 35-year-old Lawrence's disappearance as a suspected murder. Lawrence was last seen on 18 March 2009 after her day's work as a chef at the University of York. She sent a text message to a friend at 8:23 p.m. and was reported missing when she failed to arrive for work the following day. Nine people had been arrested or interviewed under caution over her disappearance as of March 2019.
March 2009	Ian Newtion	Greenford, London	45-year-old Newtion was found dead in a passageway beneath a roundabout at around 8:55 a.m. on 22 March 2009. His throat had been cut – possibly with a piece of a smashed beer bottle – but he had not been robbed. Newtion had been performing at a 60th birthday party prior to the attack and, under the stage name of Scoobie Santino and with fellow artist Sweetie Irie, had had a single in 1990 titled "Money Honey".
April 2009	Damian Clough	Keighley, West Yorkshire	Twelve-year-old Clough died in a fire at his home at Kinara Close, Stockbridge, Keighley, on 4 April 2009. A group of people visited the house that evening and two fires were started before 10:00 p.m. Two teenagers stood trial for Clough's manslaughter in 2010 but were found not guilty.
April 2009	David Weaver	Birmingham	45-year-old Weaver was battered at a murdered man's wake at a pub in Erdington, Birmingham, on 22 November 2008 after stepping in to try to calm things down when a fight had started. He died in hospital on 26 April 2009.
June 2009	Anthony Otton	Fulham, London	28-year-old Otton was killed by a single bullet to the heart as he left Geranium House, Fulham Court, London, on 4 June 2009 – the day of the wake for Darcy Austin-Bruce, who was gunned down outside Wandsworth Prison on 1 May 2009. Police believed Otton was the victim of a revenge shooting and offered a £20,000 reward for information leading to a prosecution.
June 2009	Ali Toprak	Attacked in West Kensington, London, died in hospital	33-year-old Toprak was stabbed in the heart with a screwdriver outside a nightclub on 21 June 2009 during a disturbance said to have been triggered by a man pestering his cousin to use her mobile phone to take a picture of him. A man was tried for murder at the Old Bailey and acquitted.
July 2009	James Kamara	Sheffield	On 1 July 2009, 22-year-old Kamara died after bullets fired from a passing vehicle hit him and others while he was sitting in a car in Brunswick Street, Sheffield. It is thought that the slaying was gang-related but that he was not the intended target. Four men were found not guilty of involvement in the offence.
July 2009	Nathan Williams	Attacked in New Cross, London, died in hospital	University student Williams, 24, was shot in his car in Ludwick Mews on 28 July 2009 after driving there to pick up his girlfriend.
August 2009	Marek Pudlowski	Bognor Regis, West Sussex	51-year-old Pudlowski was found dead on a bench near the seaside town's pier on 3 August 2009. Though the post mortem could not determine exactly how the Polish man had died, it did reveal that he had suffered an extensive assault immediately prior to his death. Pudlowski had seemed anxious when he was in a Bognor bank that day.
August 2009	Daniel Herbert	Attacked in Bermondsey, London, died in hospital	In an episode of violence said to have been in retaliation for Herbert and his friends burgling a Bermondsey property where cannabis was grown, the 27-year-old nightclub promoter from Orpington in southeast London was chased by four men before being beaten and shot in the Bermondsey area on 17 August 2009. He died the next day. Two men – one of whom lived at the burgled residence – were acquitted of murder but convicted of grievous bodily harm.
August 2009	Richard Clarke	Attacked in Eye, Suffolk, died at the Norfolk and Norwich University Hospital	A couple saw Clarke holding the back of his head on the driveway of his home in Eye on the evening of 21 August 2009. He was pronounced dead in hospital the following morning less than two hours after a dog walker had found the 73-year-old former thatcher collapsed where the couple had seen him, and a forensic pathologist believed he had been dragged to the ground and punched.
August 2009	Paula Hounslea	Liverpool	A dog walker discovered Hounslea's body in a fire pit near the loop line cycle path in Fazakerley on 5 May 2012. She had been missing since 22 August 2009, when she was 37 years old, and her body was identified using her medical and dental records.
August 2009	Safrajur Jahangir	Sheffield	On 28 August 2009, 23-year-old takeaway owner Jahangir was lured to where he was shot dead – Scraith Wood Drive, Shirecliffe, Sheffield – by someone pretending they wanted a curry delivered there. Six men were charged with conspiracy to murder, but their trial in 2010 was discontinued in the wake of the revelation that South Yorkshire Police had withheld vital information from the defence. A man thought to have been the actual hitman fatally overdosed on heroin before the police had enough evidence to charge him.
September 2009	Larry Malone	West Norwood, London	24-year-old Malone was shot dead through a window while sitting on a sofa in his aunt's home on Harpenden Road, West Norwood, on 3 September 2009. The crime was allegedly to do with drugs. Although two men were acquitted of Malone's murder in late 2011, they and three other people did receive sentences for possession of the submachine gun used in the act.
October 2009	Oktay Erbasli	Attacked in Tottenham, London, died in hospital	23-year-old Erbasli was shot in his car when a motorcycle pulled up to it on 2 October 2009. His girlfriend and her five-year-old son were in the car as well but not harmed. Erbasli, who ran the local Pound Stop Shop, was thought to have been involved with a gang known as the Tottenham Boys, and it was believed that his murder – one in an apparent string of tit-for-tat crimes – was connected to the rival Bombacilar gang.
October 2009	Alan Wood	Lound, Lincolnshire	On 24 October 2009, three days after he was last seen alive, 50-year-old Wood was found dead in his home, tortured – possibly for financial details – and with head wounds and a slit throat. A £60,000 reward, televised appeals and the recovery of a suspect's DNA have not resulted in a prosecution. Lincolnshire Police was pursuing fresh leads in December 2019 after an appeal in October of that year.
October 2009	Jeannie Smith	Airdrie, North Lanarkshire	41-year-old Smith's heart was fatally penetrated by a knife while she was in the driveway of her home on Oronsay Road, Airdrie, on 31 October 2009. It happened during a period of large-scale fighting in the locality, and other people were seriously hurt as well, including one of Smith's sons, who was punched, stabbed in the face and kicked. This son identified as his mother's killer a man who would be convicted of her murder in September 2010, but the following year, his evidence was deemed unreliable and the conviction was quashed.
November 2009	Daniel Duke	Attacked in Walworth, London, died in hospital	Duke, a 22-year-old described as a small-time drug dealer, died on 3 November 2009 after being shot in Alberta Street, Walworth, the day before. A silver Ford Mondeo matching a car seen at the scene was found burnt out in south London's Peckham district. Three men were acquitted of Duke's murder, but one of them was jailed for possession of the murder weapon. He claimed that police discovered it during a search of his home because it was being hidden at the request of an unknown man.
November 2009	Natalie Correa	Dagenham, London	27-year-old Correa sustained at least 15 head blows from a heavy instrument before being set on fire at her house in Lake Gardens, Dagenham, during the early hours of 19 November 2009. She was attacked as she lay on a sofa. Correa's boyfriend, a barman with whom she had a volatile relationship, was accused of murder at two separate trials, but the first jury ended up deadlocked and the second acquitted him after deliberating for four hours. The off-and-on couple slept apart that night because Correa had a cold, and the boyfriend claimed that someone else entered their home and killed her while he was upstairs, as well as that she was a heavy drinker and gambler who owed money to loan sharks.
December 2009	Philip Silvester	Kidbrooke, London	62-year-old Silvester was found dead from head and chest injuries at his home in Kellaway Road, Kidbrooke, on 13 December 2009. Police found him at the address 11 days after he had last been seen at a nearby shop.
December 2009	Grzegorz Witkowski	Body not found	Witkowski was a Polish resident of Leicester who, aged 48, vanished after leaving a party in the city at around 10:30 p.m. on 12 December 2009 and speaking a little while later to family in Poland. His case has been classed as one of murder since 2012.
December 2009	David Joslin	Attacked in Chingford, London, died in hospital	23-year-old Joslin was felled by a single punch when he attempted to stop two groups of people fighting in the street during the early hours of 20 December 2009. He was taken to Whipps Cross University Hospital in nearby Leytonstone following the punch and wrongly treated as a drunk by staff at that institution before being transferred to the capital's National Hospital for Neurology and Neurosurgery, where he died on 27 December. A man who went on trial for manslaughter in 2015 was acquitted after denying being Joslin's killer.

== See also ==
- List of people who disappeared mysteriously
- Chris Clark, British author who writes and produces documentaries about unsolved crimes
- David Smith, convicted killer suspected of being responsible for unsolved murders
