= Murder of Jason Martin-Smith =

2001 murder in England

Jason Martin-Smith
- Born: Jason Brian Martin-Smith; December 1972; Kingston upon Thames, London, England
- Died: 22 August 2001 (aged 28); Hastings, East Sussex, England
- Cause of death: Dismemberment

Jason Martin-Smith (December 1972 – 22 August 2001) was an English man murdered in Hastings, East Sussex. He was considered a missing person as the case went unsolved for 14 years, until Mark Searle was found guilty of murder at Lewes Crown Court in August 2015. Steve McNicol was also convicted of conspiracy to kidnap, while a third suspect, Frank Torpey, died before proceedings began.

The murder of Martin-Smith is heavily linked to the unsolved case of Jimmy Millen, who died in a drive-by shooting in Hastings two months later. In 2002, it was revealed that Millen was involved in the killing of Martin-Smith, although it is unknown if his death directly relates to this incident.

== Background ==
Martin-Smith was born in Kingston upon Thames, London and attended Hollyfield School, Surbiton. He moved to Hastings, East Sussex in 1999 and frequently split his time between his hometown and new area.

== Murder ==
Martin-Smith was acquainted with his killer, meeting through a drug deal, and initially worked together to burgle approximately £36,000 from Price Attack pawnbrokers in Farnborough, Hampshire. Having worked at the store for a short time, Martin-Smith took a set of keys with him when leaving. He initially believed he would only provide the keys, but was later threatened into a bigger role in the robbery.

On 10 July 2001, Martin-Smith was arrested following the search of his girlfriend's home. He remained quiet in his first police interview, but identified other members of the gang in the second interview. He also revealed he only received £25 as petrol money for his involvement in the robbery. Martin-Smith then feared for his safety and was threatened by his acquaintances after they believed he had "grassed them up". The three other men involved in the robbery, Frank Torpey, Mark Searle and Jimmy Millen, planned to take revenge after learning Martin-Smith had informed on them.

On 21 August, Martin-Smith was spotted outside a friend's house in Wilmington Road, Hastings by Steve McNicol. He made a phone call heard by witnesses to say "he's outside", before Searle and Millen attacked and forced Martin-Smith into the passenger seat of a car that pulled up. At the time, Martin-Smith was equipped with a gun and chisel in his trousers, afraid of an attack after previous threats from Millen.

The following day, two men witnessed Searle, Millen and an unnamed third man with an axe in a lock-up in Battle Road, Hastings. When one man went into the lock-up, he heard the sound of an axe hitting concrete and saw Martin-Smith's torso on the floor. The second witness said Searle had blood on his legs. Millen later revealed to the witness' brother that Martin-Smith had been shot six times, possibly in the eye, and then strangled with fridge wire. His body was never found and Millen believed Martin-Smith's head was burned in a garden dustbin that had been searched by police.

== Investigation ==
In January 2002, a murder investigation was launched after police received information that Martin-Smith had been shot dead back in August. The case was then linked to the murder of Jimmy Millen, who was killed in a drive-by shooting while working on his car in October 2001. After proof of life enquiries were made by police, Frank Torpey, Mark Searle and Steve McNicol were arrested in a series of dawn raids on suspicion of murdering Martin-Smith. Searle remained silent during three interviews, McNicol told police he thought the others would only assault Martin-Smith, and Torpey stated that they "just wanted to get hold of him". The men were later released on police bail.

In February 2002, police begun searching an area of Kelk Wood for human remains following another tip-off. Police also searched the lock-up used to dismember Martin-Smith but found insufficient evidence or criminal intelligence. Police attempted to charge Torpey, Searle and McNicol for the murder of Martin-Smith, but the case was dropped in March when the Crown Prosecution Service did not agree with the charges.

Sussex Police reopened the case in 2014 with more witnesses coming forward. One suspect, Torpey, had died in the intervening years.

In March 2023, Sussex Police searched an area of woodland near Marley Lane, Battle after receiving new information through a 'viable' tip-off. After a week of searching with specialist teams, police called off the search with no evidence of the body found.

== Sentencing ==
In February 2015, four men were arrested in connection with the murders of Martin-Smith and Millen. The following day, Mark Searle and Steve McNicol were charged with murder and conspiracy to kidnap. They appeared at Lewes Crown Court a week later and were remanded in custody.

On 21 August 2015, the 14th anniversary of the disappearance, 36-year-old Searle was sentenced to life in prison for the murder of Martin-Smith. He was also found guilty of conspiracy to kidnap and perverting the course of justice with a minimum tariff of 29 years. 42-year-old McNicol was jailed for 4 1/2 years for conspiracy to kidnap, after his murder charges were discontinued at the start of the trial.

== Connection to murder of Jimmy Millen ==
Jimmy Millen
- Born: James Michael Baines Millen; 2 November 1973; Kirkby, Merseyside, England
- Died: 24 October 2001 (aged 27); Hastings, East Sussex, England
- Cause of death: Drive-by shooting
- Children: 3

James "Jimmy" Millen was a 27-year-old doorman and former boxer from Kirkby, Merseyside. He moved to Hastings, East Sussex several years before his death to pursue a new life and was married with three children. Millen was locally known to be heavily involved in the criminal underworld alongside Martin-Smith.

On 24 October 2001, Millen was shot four times outside his home by two men on a motorbike. Having been working on a car, he crawled to a nearby road but later died in hospital. Police labelled the incident as a "carefully planned attack" and immediately treated the case as a murder. A £10,000 reward was subsequently offered for information leading to an arrest and conviction, and later increased to £25,000. In December, police issued sketches of two suspects seen close to where Millen was shot. Shortly after his death, his father, Fred Millen, said that his son was "no angel and not liked by everyone in Hastings but did not deserve to die in this way".

In January 2002, Millen's family told police of his involvement in the murder of Martin-Smith alongside four other men. He had disclosed the murder to his wife the morning after, who described him as 'distraught'. Millen said he was on his way home from Liverpool when he received a phone call stating the group had abducted Martin-Smith, and he joined them before Martin-Smith was killed, dismembered and buried. The family also named the individuals they believed to be involved, who were later arrested and interviewed.

Ten years after the murder, Millen's widow criticised the police for their inaction surrounding the case. His family claimed the police were hesitant to act because he had a criminal record, and also stated that they believe his killers live locally. Millen's father sent letters to the Chief Constable, the Home Office and Prime Minister Tony Blair in complaint over the police's handling of the investigation. Investigating officers later criticised the family's conduct, refuting their claims and suggesting the family hindered proceedings with their own actions.

In September 2012, two fishing lakes were searched for a potential firearm after new evidence emerged. However, no weapons were retrieved from the scene after a two-week search.

== See also ==
- List of solved missing person cases (2000s)
