= Exmoor Body mystery =

Murder mystery in Somerset, England

The Exmoor Body mystery concerns the remains of an unidentified murder victim found on Winsford Hill, near Winsford, Somerset on 13 March 2002.

== Discovery ==
The body was discovered on moorland near Halse Lane on Winsford Hill in March 2002 by a park ranger who didn't open the bags and assumed they were animal remains. The remains were taken to the Devon and Somerset stag hounds kennels where there is an incinerator. After several days the bags were opened and the remains were discovered to be human.

== Identification attempts ==
Examination of the body showed that he was a man in his mid-20s to mid-30s. A distinctive gold pendant he wore with verse 255 from the Quran led investigators to consider that he may be a Muslim.

He suffered injuries consistent with a violent death between late 1999 and 2000. He may have been buried on Exmoor at some time after May 2001.

== Burial ==
The body was buried in an Islamic funeral in a cemetery in Watchet.

== Appeals ==
There were numerous appeals for information on his identity in 2002 including international inquiries as well as a TV reconstruction. In 2017 a new appeal was launched as he still had not been identified, even though a full DNA profile had been created.
