= Disappearance of April Fabb =

1969 missing person case in Norfolk, England

April Fabb
- Fabb, c. spring 1969
- Born: April Fabb; 22 April 1955; North Walsham, Norfolk, England
- Disappeared: 8 April 1969 (aged 13), c. 2:11 pm Metton, Norfolk; 52.8883°N 1.2675°E
- Status: Missing for 57 years, 7 months and 13 days
- Known for: Missing person
- Height: 5 ft 4 in (1.63 m) (approximate)
- Parents: Albert Ernest Fabb; Olive Martha (née Mallett) Fabb
- Distinguishing features: Caucasian female. Moderately long, light brown hair.

April Fabb (22 April 1955 – disappeared 8 April 1969) was a 13-year-old English schoolgirl who disappeared while cycling from her home in Metton, Norfolk, to the neighbouring village of Roughton—a distance of less than 2 miles (3.2 km)—on the afternoon of 8 April 1969. She is strongly believed to have been abducted and murdered, although her body has never been found.

Fabb was last seen alive cycling along a rural road in the direction of Roughton at approximately 2:06 pm; her bicycle was discovered discarded in a nearby field nine minutes later. Despite extensive police efforts, both at the time of her disappearance and in more recent decades, the case remains unsolved, and no individual has ever been charged with her abduction or murder.

The disappearance of April Fabb is widely regarded as one of the most infamous missing child cases in British history; the police investigation into her disappearance has been also described as one of the most exhaustive in the history of Norfolk Constabulary. Although officially a cold case, the investigation remains open and subject to periodic review.

== Early life ==
April Fabb was born on 22 April 1955 in North Walsham, Norfolk. She was the youngest of three daughters born to Albert Ernest and Olive Martha (née Mallett) Fabb. Her older sisters were Pamela (b. 1942) and Diane (b. 1948). Her father was a builder, and her mother a housewife who occasionally volunteered to work in the local rectory. The family resided in Metton—then a hamlet with a population of 79—and were devoutly religious. Fabb attended Cromer Academy (then known as Cromer Secondary Modern School), where she was regarded as a studious and popular pupil.

Fabb, c. 1968

By April 1969, Fabb was 5 ft 4 in (160 cm) in height, with moderately long, light brown hair. She appeared slightly older than her 13 years, and has been described as somewhat shy and reserved in nature. An avid music fan, Fabb invariably watched Top of the Pops on Thursday evenings, and had recently decorated her bedroom with several posters of her favourite rock band Amen Corner. She also enjoyed stamp collecting and sewing, and occasionally repaired or embroidered her own clothes, but expressed little interest in make-up or contemporary fashion, with her parents later reflecting their youngest daughter had "never dressed up or made herself up like some girls do".

== 8 April 1969 ==
On Tuesday, 8 April 1969, Fabb's school was closed for Easter, but was scheduled to reopen the following day. As one of the scheduled lessons for the following day was needlework, she had originally intended to travel to Norwich with a friend named Susan Dixon to purchase sewing materials, only to be informed in person by Dixon's mother shortly after midday that her friend was unable to accompany her. Upon receipt of this news, Fabb "sat on the sofa with tears in her eyes", prompting her mother to suggest she cycle "down the road" to telephone another close friend, Gillian Smith, and ask if she would like to accompany her on a shopping trip to Norwich. (Note: The Fabb family did not have a home telephone at the time of April's disappearance.) Fabb agreed to this suggestion; she returned home several minutes later, cheerfully informing her mother that although Smith—who lived in Northrepps—was unable to accompany her to Norwich that day, she had agreed to do so that weekend. Fabb then briefly assisted her mother with kitchen chores.

Olive Fabb would later recollect that, as her daughter's original plans for the afternoon were altered, Fabb had seemed bewildered as to what she could do to occupy her time; in response, Olive suggested she deliver the birthday gifts she had recently purchased for her brother-in-law, Bernard Moy, to his house—also giving her an opportunity to see her baby nephew, Duncan, upon whom she doted. Fabb agreed to this suggestion; she then walked upstairs into her bedroom to change out of her trousers into a woolen divided skirt and tie her hair in a bow at the back. She then collected the packet of ten cigarettes a friend of her mother had purchased for her that morning as her brother-in-law's birthday gift, (Note: Fabb's brother-in-law's birthday had been on 6 April. She had originally purchased sweets as his birthday gift, which she had recently eaten. As Fabb did not smoke and was too young to purchase cigarettes, on the morning of 8 April, she had asked a family friend to purchase the cigarettes for her as an alternate present to give him.) plus a new handkerchief, and placed them—alongside 5½d in loose change—inside her bicycle's white saddlebag before proceeding to cycle toward her sister's house in Roughton.

Contemporary scale map depicting the cycle route between Fabb's home and the location of the discovery of her bicycle

Fabb left her home at approximately 1:40 pm. She was wearing a wine-coloured skirt, a green jumper, long white socks and a pair of new, wooden-soled sandals with red straps and brass buckles. Olive Fabb would later recollect that the last word her youngest daughter spoke to her was a casual "Cheerio" as she began cycling toward her sister's house. The distance between Metton and Roughton is approximately 1.7 miles (2.7 km), and would typically have taken Fabb less than ten minutes to complete via bicycle.

Approximately 200 yards from her her home, Fabb encountered two 12-year-old friends and classmates, Christine Dixon and Maureen Hueck, riding a donkey in a field alongside Harrison's Farm; she stopped to talk with the two as they walked around the field before continuing on her journey approximately ten minutes later. She was last seen alive by a tractor driver named Joseph Livingston-Brown cycling some 200 yards further along the road, close to a Y-shaped junction named Pillar Box Corner. The timing of this final sighting was approximately 2:06 pm.

=== Disappearance ===
At approximately 2:15 pm, two Ordnance Survey workers observed Fabb's blue-and-white BSA bicycle lying at the edge of a sugar beet field. The bicycle had evidently been thrown over a four-foot grass bank, and the location was approximately 150 yards beyond the crossroads at Pillar Box Corner, approximately 0.5 miles (0.80 km) from Fabb's home, and not alongside the most direct route between the Fabb and Moy households. Neither observed anything suspicious, and they continued on their journey. Forty-five minutes later, a passing motorist named David Empson took the bicycle—which he believed had been lost or stolen—to the village police station, where officers noted the saddlebag contained an unopened packet of cigarettes, a blue handkerchief, and 5½d in loose change. With the exception of a minor dent upon the bell, Fabb's bicycle was undamaged.

Norfolk Constabulary photograph of Fabb's bicycle, as discovered in Metton following her disappearance

When Fabb had not returned home by 7 pm, her mother—having initially assumed her youngest daughter had stayed at her sister's home for the remainder of the afternoon—became anxious, although her husband attempted to placate her fears by stating: "Don't worry, Bernard will bring her home when he's ready." Ninety minutes later, she travelled to her oldest daughter's home to accompany April back home, only to discover she had not arrived at her sister's house. Albert and Olive Fabb then telephoned and/or visited each of her friends' homes, only to discover she had not visited any of her friends that afternoon. When Fabb had not returned home by 10 pm, her parents reported her missing. Shortly thereafter, they identified the bicycle discovered that afternoon as belonging to her.

== Investigation ==
Norfolk Constabulary rapidly determined Fabb's disappearance was involuntary and immediately implemented an intense manhunt to locate her, with Detective Chief Inpector James Blake stating at a press conference on 9 April that police were viewing Fabb's disappearance "in a very, very serious light" before adding investigators were cautiously optimistic as to "[locating Fabb] well and alive". The manhunt to locate Fabb was headed by Detective Chief Superintendent (DCS) Reginald Lester, and saw every inhabitant of Metton, Roughton and Sustead questioned and their alibis verified. Appeals for any individual who had been sighted in the vicinity of Metton on the afternoon of 8 April to come forward and assist in police inquiries saw several individuals who had been within earshot of the location of Fabb's suspected abduction contact authorities, although none of these individuals reported having seen or heard anything suspicious.

A forensic examination of Fabb's bicycle failed to yield any fingerprints belonging to her abductor(s); the sole fingerprints recovered belonged to Fabb herself or David Empson, whom investigators eliminated as a potential suspect upon verifying his alibi as to his whereabouts at the time of Fabb's disappearance.

In the days immediately following Fabb's disappearance, every landmark and piece of terrain within a seven-mile radius of her household was also thoroughly searched by the forty police officers assigned full-time to the manhunt, search and rescue dogs, an air-sea rescue helicopter, and underwater search units, with the search progress coordinated and updated from an incident room based in Cromer. The police search was assisted by hundreds of volunteers, including several RAF personnel stationed at Neatishead. The sole item of potential evidentiary value recovered on the first day of the police search—a bloodstained rag discovered in a field 0.5 miles (0.80 km) from where Fabb's bicycle had been discovered—was rapidly discovered to be unrelated to Fabb's disappearance when a woman informed investigators she had used the rag to clean her son's grazed knee the previous day.

By 10 April, 120 officers and volunteers had been assigned full-time to the ongoing ground search, with investigators ultimately pursuing potential leads of inquiry as far afield as Hampshire. Media appeals for information as to Fabb's whereabouts were gradually disseminated nationwide, with the lead singer of Amen Corner, Andy Fairweather Low, also issuing a personal appeal for Fabb to return home upon Radio 1, adding he would meet her in person if she would assure her family of her well-being.

=== Eyewitness sightings ===
One early police line of inquiry was to trace all vehicles in the vicinity of Metton on the date of Fabb's suspected abduction and eliminate their owners from the investigation. As two schoolboys had spent the day logging the registration numbers of all vehicles passing through Metton and Roughton in their notebooks, investigators traced and interviewed the owners of every one of the 400 logged vehicles; (Note: A handful of the entries within these notebooks were inaccurate or illegible. As such, police were unable to trace a small number of the registration numbers entered within the schoolboys' notebooks.) all were discounted as suspects although a man seen by witnesses "lying resting" across the front seats of a cream or fawn vehicle believed to be either a Ford Consul or Vauxhall Cresta close to where Fabb was last seen alive and two "rough-looking" young men seen seen driving a small, black 1958 model Morris 1000 van with a missing rear door handle in the direction of Metton shortly after 2 pm were never traced, despite extensive nationwide appeals for these individuals to contact police and eliminate themselves from the police inquiry. (Note: Neither of these two vehicles had been logged in the schoolboys' notebooks.)

Another line of inquiry involved eyewitness reports of a girl of Fabb's description, wearing clothing closely matching those she had worn at the time of her disappearance, who was observed travelling on the 3:58 pm train from Cromer to North Walsham on the afternoon of 8 April. A public appeal for this girl to come forward and be eliminated from police inquiries produced two further eyewitnesses who had also seen a girl matching this description in the waiting room at North Walsham railway station at approximately 6:15 pm. The girl seen at North Walsham railway station later came forward and was eliminated from police inquiries; the girl observed upon the 3:58 pm train to North Walsham was never located.

=== Clairvoyant assistance ===
In the summer of 1969, a renowned clairvoyant named Gerard Croiset contacted Norfolk Constabulary to offer his assistance in locating Fabb; he later sent illustrations of landmarks and locations he had seen in visions as being crucial to locating the child. Croiset also added Fabb's abductor was local to the region, approximately 48 years old and owned a rifle. This individual also had a pet Alsatian.

At the request of investigators, in early September, Croiset flew from his home in Utrecht to Norfolk International Airport to locate the landmarks described in his visions: a church close to an ice cream parlour and what Croiset described as a "rifle shop". He was met at the airport by a senior investigator assigned to the case. The two then travelled to North Norfolk in efforts to locate the landmarks described in his visions.

Croiset remained adamant none of the towns and villages in the immediate vicinity of Fabb's disappearance had any association with her disappearance; however, when he and a senior detective travelled to the nearby market town of Aylsham, Croiset led the detective to a gunsmiths closely resembling that within the illustrations he had provided to investigators before remarking: "This is the place I saw in my vision. The man who took April away uses the rifle shop."

== Cold case ==
Despite an extensive and exhaustive contemporary police investigation, which saw over 1,970 witness statements taken, numerous persons of interest questioned and eliminated as suspects, areas of interest excavated and a substantial reward offered for information leading to Fabb's safe return, all leads of inquiry failed to bear fruit, and Fabb's abduction remained unsolved, with DCS Lester remarking in 1972 of his belief the inquiry team had "never even [received] a lukewarm lead" to pursue.

By the mid-1970s, the investigation into Fabb's disappearance had largely become cold, but remained subject to periodic review. Numerous renewed appeals for information in the intervening decades have since generated leads and tips from the public, although none have resulted in locating Fabb or identifying her abductor or abductors.

More recent police searches for Fabb have included the 1997 use of thermal imaging cameras to scan areas deemed of interest to the case, a thorough search of the pipelines at Bacton Gas Terminal and—in response to reports from a local landowner that he had observed black polythene sheeting at the bottom of a well at the time of Fabb's disappearance—the excavation of a Metton well in 2010. Each search failed to either locate Fabb or yield any clues as to her fate.

=== Later events and developments ===
==== Murder of Susan Long ====
On the morning of 11 March 1970, a milkman discovered the body of an 18-year-old clerk named Susan Margaret Long in Burgh Road, Aylsham. Long was last seen alive exiting a bus at 11:14 the previous evening, having earlier visited the Gala Dance Hall in Norwich with her boyfriend. She is believed to have shortly thereafter either accepted a lift from the driver of, or been forced into, a car which had most likely been recently resprayed a metallic maroon from a "pompadour blue" in colour. An autopsy revealed Long had been sexually assaulted and strangled, although she had fought with her murderer prior to her death.

Despite semen samples from the crime scene revealing the perpetrator's blood type to be of a rare origin and a resultant police exercise of obtaining blood samples of all local men for comparison with the sample, Long's murder also remains unsolved. Although her murder had occurred just 8.7 miles (14.0 km) from the site of Fabb's abduction, investigators have never established any conclusive link between the two cases.

==== Disappearance of Genette Tate ====
The August 1978 disappearance of 13-year-old Devonshire schoolgirl Genette Tate has also been tentatively linked to the same perpetrator, although no definitive connection between the two cases has ever been established. Tate disappeared while delivering newspapers along a rural lane in Aylesbeare, Devon, on the afternoon of 19 August 1978; her bicycle was discovered discarded in the centre of the lane minutes after she was last seen alive by two school friends named Tracey Pratt and Margaret Heavey.

At the time of Tate's disappearance, both Norfolk Constabulary and Devon and Cornwall Police noted the strong similarities between the Tate and Fabb cases, including the fact that both were Caucasian girls in their early teens who disappeared while riding bicycles on rural lanes close to holiday resorts; however, Aylesbeare is approximately 308 miles (496 km) from Metton. Furthermore, despite the general similarities in the circumstances regarding the girls' abductions, no definitive link between the two cases has ever been established. Both cases remain unsolved.

==== Robert Black ====
Serial child murderer Robert Black was repeatedly questioned over the disappearances of Fabb and Tate following his arrest in July 1990; both cases were among the six unsolved child murders and disappearances committed across the UK and West Germany in which investigators particularly considered Black a person of interest and in which he was extensively questioned following his 1994 convictions.

At the time of Tate's disappearance, Black lived in London and had been employed as a van driver for a Hoxton-based firm named Poster, Dispatch and Storage Ltd. for two years, with the majority of his delivery destinations being in South West England. He was due to be formally charged with Tate's abduction at the time of his death in January 2016; however, at the time of Fabb's disappearance, Black primarily earned a living via various forms of casual work, although he had obtained his driving license, and is known to have sexually assaulted at least two girls prior to 1969.

Black is not considered by some to be a strong suspect in Fabb's disappearance, although no evidence exists to formally eliminate him as a suspect. Nonetheless, one senior investigator involved the manhunt to apprehend Black is known to have remarked in 1994: "We know [Black] killed Genette Tate and April Fabb and we believe that their bodies are buried somewhere in the Midlands triangle."

"Olive was a remarkable woman. She had forty-four years of agony, and the sadness is ... she died not knowing. But, she bore it with great courage, dignity and stoicism, and clung on to faint hope."

— Maurice Morson, former Head of Norfolk Constabulary Criminal Investigation Department, reflecting upon Olive Fabb's lifelong hope to discover her daughter's fate and provide her with a Christian burial. 24 April 2013.

== Aftermath ==
April Fabb has never been located, and although the actual motive for her disappearance remains unknown, many past and present investigators assigned to the case remain convinced Fabb was abducted by an individual or individuals with a sexual motive, with one investigator remarking in 2005 the perpetrator was either a local whom police "never really had enough in our sights" or an individual driving through Metton who had abducted Fabb in a crime of opportunity. Although a cold case, the investigation into Fabb's disappearance remains open and is subject to periodic review.

Albert Fabb died of natural causes in March 1998 at age 81. Olive Fabb died at the Pine Heath Nursing Home in High Kelling, Norfolk, on 19 April 2013 at age 93. Both are buried together in St. Andrew's churchyard in Metton at the base of an arched granite headstone erected in honour and memory of their youngest daughter inscribed with the words 'A child who disappeared from this parish in April 1969 of whom nothing has since been heard'. On each anniversary of Fabb's disappearance, the headstone is adorned with daffodils.

Four days after their mother's death, Fabb's surviving sisters, Pamela and Diane, issued a statement reflecting upon the impact of their younger sister's disappearance, the pain of the uncertainty as to her fate and whereabouts, and their parents' stoic efforts to continue to lead a normal life despite the hardships. This statement read in part: "Mum and dad's world stopped that beautiful spring day in April 1969, but, for our sake, they tried to lead a normal life. Mum was the stronger one—an amazing woman. I would have lost my mind, but she never lost her Christian faith, which helped her through."

Detective Chief Superintendent Reginald Lester, the individual assigned overall command of the original manhunt to locate April Fabb, died at the age of 92 in February 2017. He had retired in 1983, and maintained contact with Fabb's parents until their deaths.

== Media ==
=== Literature ===
- Morson, Maurice (2012) [1995]. The Lost Years: The Story of April Fabb. Essex: Redbridge Books. ISBN 978-0-952-01927-5.
- Swinney, Chris (2015). Robert Black: the True Story of a Child Rapist and Serial Killer. Canada: R. J. Parker Publishing Inc. pp. 107–111. ISBN 978-1-517-62415-6.

=== Television ===
- Enigma: The Girl Who Wouldn't Talk to Strangers. Presented by journalist and author Ludovic Kennedy, this 30-minute documentary was first broadcast on 16 September 1981.
- Missing Children: Lorraine Kelly Investigates S01E03. Directed by Paul Freeman and hosted by Lorraine Kelly, this 45-minute episode was first broadcast on 26 August 2009.
- Killers Behind Bars: The Untold Story S01E03. Narrated by criminologist David Wilson, this 40-minute episode was first broadcast on 26 June 2012.

=== Theatre ===
- Into Thin Air (2018). Directed by Robert John and Dawn Finnerty and directly inspired by the disappearance of April Fabb, Into Thin Air premiered at Sheringham Little Theatre on 5 October 2018.

== See also ==
- Child abduction
- Cold case – Unsolved crime not now being investigated
- Crime of opportunity – Crime committed without planning
- List of kidnappings (1960–1969)
- List of people who disappeared mysteriously (1910–1970)
- The Doe Network – U.S. nonprofit organization

== Cited works and further reading ==
- Apostolides, Zoë (2022). End of Innocence: The Untold Stories Behind the Victims of Child Killer Robert Black. Suffolk: Gemini Books Group. ISBN 978-1-914-45145-4.
- Bauchman, Rosemary (1991). Mysteries and Marvels: Incredible Happenings from Near and Far. Nova Scotia: Lancelot Press. ISBN 978-0-889-99490-4.
- Church, Robert (1996). Well Done, Boys: the Life and Crimes of Robert Black. London: Constable & Company Ltd. ISBN 978-0-094-74150-8.
- Collins, James J. (1999). Law Enforcement Policies and Practices Regarding Missing Children and Homeless Youth. United States: Office of Juvenile Justice and Delinquency Prevention. ISBN 978-0-788-18639-4.
- Fido, Martin (2001). A History of British Serial Killing: How Britain's Most Famous Serial Killers Were Identified, Caught and Convicted. London: Welbeck Publishing Group. ISBN 978-1-842-22204-1.
- Greene, Dr. Karen Shalev; Alys, Llian (2016). Missing Persons: A Handbook of Research. London: Routledge. ISBN 978-1-409-46802-8.
- Marriner, Brian (1994). "Murderer of Childhood". True Crime Detective Monthly (August 1994 ed.). Magazine Design & Publishing Ltd. pp. 10–14. ISSN 0261-264X.
- Murphy, Paul (2011). Guide for Implementing or Enhancing an Endangered Missing Advisory (EMA). Washington: U. S. Department of Justice. ISBN 978-1-437-98383-8.
- Newton, Michael (2004). The Encyclopedia of Unsolved Crimes. New York: Facts on File. ISBN 978-0-816-07818-9.
- Odell, Robin; Donnelley, Paul (2016). The Mammoth Book of More Bizarre Crimes. London: Little, Brown Book Group. ISBN 978-1-472-11804-2.
- Pender, Patrick (1993). "Robert Black: Evil Child Killer Of Susan Maxwell, Caroline Hogg and Sarah Harper". Real-Life Crimes. Vol. 108. Eaglemoss Publications Ltd. ISBN 978-1-858-75042-2.
- Pettem, Silvia (2017). The Long Term Missing: Hope and Help for Families. Maryland: Rowman & Littlefield. ISBN 978-1-442-25680-4.
- Sanders, John (2016). "Death of a Serial Killer". True Detective Monthly (April 2016 ed.). Magazine Design & Publishing Ltd. pp. 14–15. ISSN 0041-350X.
- Soothill, Keith; Walby, Sylvia (2023). Sex Crime in the News. New York: Taylor & Francis. ISBN 978-1-000-86065-8.
- Sprague, Donald F. (2013). Investigating Missing Children Cases: A Guide for First Responders and Investigators. New York: Taylor & LFrancis Group. ISBN 978-1-439-86063-2.
- Sutherland, Jonathan; Canwell, Diane (2007). Unsolved East Anglian murders. Barnsley: Wharncliffe Publishing. ISBN 978-1-845-63044-7.
- Whittington-Egan, Richard (2006). Murder Files: True Stories of Murder. London: Constable & Robinson Limited. pp. 129–130. ISBN 978-1-845-29435-9.
- Wynn, Douglas (2015). Scunthorpe Murders. Cheltenham: History Press. ISBN 978-0-750-973854-.
- Wyre, Ray; Tate, Timothy; Richardson, Charmaine (2018). The Murder of Childhood: Inside the Mind of One of Britain's Most Notorious Child Murderers. Hampshire: Waterside Press. ISBN 978-1-909-97662-7.
