= Robert Black (serial killer) =

Scottish serial killer (1947–2016)

- Mugshot of Black, taken after his July 1990 arrest
- Born: 21 April 1947; Grangemouth, Stirlingshire, Scotland
- Died: 12 January 2016 (aged 68); HMP Maghaberry, Northern Ireland
- Convictions: Murder; Kidnap; Preventing the lawful burial of a body Sexual assault Attempted kidnap
- Penalty: Life imprisonment

Details
- Victims: 4+
- Span of crimes: 12 August 1981 – 14 July 1990
- Country: United Kingdom
- Date apprehended: 14 July 1990

Robert Black (21 April 1947 – 12 January 2016) was a Scottish serial killer and paedophile who was convicted of the kidnap, rape and murder of four girls aged between 5 and 11 in a series of crimes committed between 1981 and 1986 in the United Kingdom.

Black was convicted of the kidnapping, rape, and murder of Susan Maxwell, Caroline Hogg and Sarah Harper on 19 May 1994. He was also convicted of the attempted kidnapping of a fourth girl and had earlier been convicted of the kidnapping and sexual assault of a fifth. He was sentenced to life imprisonment, with a recommendation that he serve a minimum of 35 years.

In 2011, Black was further convicted of the 1981 sexual assault and murder of nine-year-old Jennifer Cardy. At the time of his death in 2016, he was regarded as the prime suspect in the 1978 disappearance and murder of 13-year-old Genette Tate. Black may also have been responsible for several other unsolved child murders in Britain, Ireland, and continental Europe between 1969 and 1987.

The nationwide manhunt for Black was one of the most exhaustive murder investigations in British history. He died of a heart attack at HMP Maghaberry in 2016 aged 68.

== Early life ==
=== Childhood ===
Robert Black was born in Grangemouth, Stirlingshire, on 21 April 1947, the illegitimate child of Jessie Hunter Black and an unknown father. His mother originally planned to have him adopted before she emigrated to Australia to escape the stigma of his birth. He was not adopted, and at six months old was placed with an experienced, middle-aged foster couple in Kinlochleven named Jack and Margaret Tulip. He adopted their surname until his foster mother's death.

Black showed antisocial tendencies and became known as an aggressive child with few friends. He was prone to tantrums and vandalised school property. He was also a target for bullying among children his own age, and became a bully towards younger children. Though his foster mother insisted upon cleanliness, he cared little for his own hygiene and was called "Smelly Bobby Tulip" by classmates.

At the age of five, Black and a girl the same age compared their genitals, triggering a childhood belief within Black that he should have been born female, and he developed a deep interest in his genitalia, the genitals of female children, and body orifices. From the age of eight he would regularly insert objects in his own anus, a practice he carried into adulthood.

Locals later recalled seeing bruises on Black's face and limbs, suggesting he had been physically abused by his foster parents. Black stated he could not recollect their origin, and they may have resulted from childhood fights. Despite being adamant he could not recall the origin of these bruises, Black was a chronic bed wetter, and freely admitted to being berated and beaten by his foster mother for each offence.

By 1958, the Tulips had both died, and Black was placed with another foster family in Kinlochleven. He soon committed his first known sexual assault, dragging a young girl into a public lavatory and fondling her. His foster mother reported the offence and insisted he be removed from her home.

=== Adolescence ===
Black was placed in a mixed-sex children's home on the outskirts of Falkirk. Here he regularly exposed himself to girls, and on one occasion, he forcibly removed the underwear of a girl. As a result, he was sent to Red House Care Home, a high-discipline, all-male establishment in Musselburgh where he was listed as Boy Number 28. Black was sexually abused by a male staff member there for three years; typically by being forced to perform fellatio. During this time, he attended Musselburgh Grammar School, developing an interest in football and swimming. Other students recalled him as taciturn, with few friends.

In 1963, Black left the Red House Care Home. With assistance from child welfare agencies, he moved to another boys' home in Greenock and obtained a job as a butcher's delivery boy. He later said that he had fondled thirty to forty young girls while making deliveries if, upon calling at the house, he discovered young girls who were alone. None of these incidents seem to have been reported.

== First convictions ==
On a summer evening in 1963, Black encountered a seven-year-old girl playing alone in a Greenock park; he lured the child to a deserted air-raid shelter on the pretext of showing her some kittens. There he held the girl by the throat until she lost consciousness, then masturbated over her body. The following day, Black was arrested and charged with lewd and libidinous behaviour. A psychiatric examination suggested the incident was an isolated one, and that Black was not in need of treatment; as a result he was admonished for the offence.

Shortly after, Black moved to Grangemouth, where he lodged with an elderly couple and worked for a builders' supply company. He began dating a young woman he met at a local youth club. This was his only known girlfriend, and they dated for several months. According to Black, he had asked this woman to marry him, and was devastated when she abruptly ended their relationship, in part due to his unusual sexual demands.

In 1966, Black's landlords discovered he had molested their nine-year-old granddaughter whenever she visited their household. They evicted him but did not inform police, wanting to spare their granddaughter further trauma. Black lost his job soon after, and he returned to Kinlochleven, where he lodged with a married couple who had a six-year-old daughter.

=== Borstal sentence ===
Within a year, Black's landlords informed police that he had repeatedly molested their daughter. He pleaded guilty to three counts of indecent assault against a child and was sentenced to a year at Polmont Borstal in Brightons, an institution which specialised in the training and rehabilitation of serious youthful offenders. Although he later spoke freely about every aspect of his youth and adolescence—including the sexual abuse he had suffered at the Red House Care Home—he refused to discuss Polmont Borstal beyond saying he had vowed to never again be imprisoned; this has led to speculation that he may have been brutalised there.

== Relocation to London ==
In September 1968, six months after his release from Polmont Borstal, Black moved to London, where he initially found lodgings in a bedsit close to King's Cross station. Between 1968 and 1970, he supported himself through various—often casual—jobs. One of these was as a lifeguard at a Hornsey swimming pool, where he was soon fired for fondling a young girl; no charges were brought.

Via a contact he had met at a King's Cross bookshop, Black began to collect child pornography. Initially, much of this material was in magazine and photograph format, although he later expanded this material to include videos depicting graphic child sexual abuse. As Black was a keen amateur photographer, he sometimes also secretly photographed children (mostly girls between eight and twelve) at public places such as swimming pools; he stored these images alongside his pornographic material in locked suitcases.

Black frequented the Three Crowns, a Stoke Newington pub, where he became known as a proficient darts player. There he also met a Scottish couple, Edward and Kathy Rayson. In 1972, he moved into their attic on nearby West Bank road in Stamford Hill. The Raysons considered Black a responsible if somewhat reclusive tenant who gave them no cause for complaint beyond his poor hygiene. They suspected Black of viewing pornographic material, but had no idea it might be paedophilic. Black remained their lodger until he was arrested in July 1990.

=== Long-distance driving employment ===
To increase his scope for casual work, in the mid-1970s Black bought a white Fiat van to enable him to commit to driving for a living. In 1976, Black obtained a permanent job as a van driver for Poster, Dispatch and Storage Ltd, a Hoxton-based firm whose fleet delivered posters—typically depicting pop stars—and billboard advertisements in the UK and Europe. To his employers, Black was a conscientious employee who was willing to undertake the long-distance deliveries some of his married co-workers disliked.

While working as a driver, Black developed a thorough knowledge of much of the British road network, subsequently enabling him to snatch children across the country and dispose of their bodies hundreds of miles from the site of their abduction. To reduce the chance of being identified by eyewitnesses, Black often adjusted his appearance by alternately growing a beard or appearing clean-shaven, and occasionally shaved his head completely bald. Black also owned over a dozen pairs of spectacles, and would wear a pair significantly different from those he regularly wore when abducting children. He also covered the rear windows of his van with opaque black curtains.

== First murders ==
=== Jennifer Cardy ===
The first murder Black is proven to have committed was that of nine-year-old Jennifer Cardy, who was abducted, sexually assaulted and murdered on 12 August 1981. Cardy was last seen by her mother at 1:40 p.m. as she cycled to a friend's house in Ballinderry, County Antrim; she never arrived.

Hours later, Cardy's bicycle was discovered less than a mile from her home, covered with branches and leaves. The stand of the bicycle was down, suggesting that she had stopped her bicycle to converse with her abductor. A search aided by 200 volunteers found nothing further. (Note: The search party contained both Catholic and Protestant volunteers.)

Six days later, two anglers discovered Cardy's body in a reservoir near a lay-by in Hillsborough, 16 miles (26 km) from her home. A pathologist noted signs of sexual abuse on Cardy's body and underwear; the autopsy concluded she had died of drowning—most likely accompanied by ligature strangulation. The watch she had been wearing had stopped at 5:40 p.m.

The location of the body near a major arterial road between Belfast and Dublin led police to suspect her murderer had been familiar with the area. The reservoir in which her body was found was near a route frequented by long-distance delivery drivers, and visible only yards away from the lay-by, suggesting that her killer may have travelled extensively upon this route.

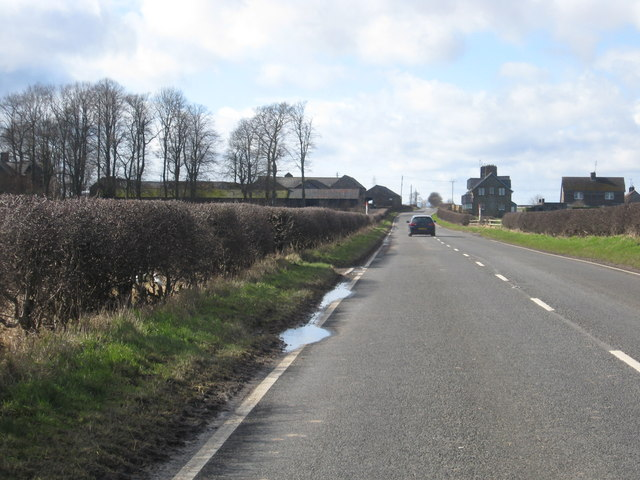
The A697 towards Cornhill-on-Tweed. Black is believed to have abducted Susan Maxwell as she walked along this road on 30 July 1982.

=== Susan Maxwell ===
Black's second confirmed victim was 11-year-old Susan Claire Maxwell, who lived in Cornhill-on-Tweed on the English side of the Anglo-Scottish border. Maxwell was abducted on 30 July 1982 as she walked home from playing tennis in Coldstream. She was last seen alive at 4:30 p.m., crossing the bridge over the River Tweed, and is believed to have been abducted by Black minutes later.

The following day a search was mounted. Search dogs were used, and at peak 300 officers were assigned full-time; a thorough search was made of every property in both Cornhill and Coldstream and over 80 square miles of terrain. Several people reported having seen a white van in the locality; one said a van had been parked in a field gateway off the A697.

On 12 August, Maxwell's body was found by a lorry driver; her body was covered with undergrowth, and was clothed save for her shoes and underwear. The precise date and cause of her death could not be determined due to decomposition. Maxwell had been bound, and gagged with sticking plaster, and her underwear had been removed and folded beneath her head, suggesting that she had been sexually assaulted.

A coroner's inquest concluded that Maxwell died shortly after being abducted. Evidently, Maxwell remained in Black's van—alive or dead—for over 24 hours, as his delivery schedule encompassed Edinburgh, Dundee, and finally Glasgow, where he made his final delivery close to midnight on 30 July. The following day, Black returned from Glasgow to London, discarding Maxwell's body in a copse beside the A518 road near Uttoxeter, 264 miles (425 km) from where she had been abducted. One of Black's colleagues suspected Black might have been involved in the abduction and murder; when he asked Black about it, Black lied. The colleague did not pass on his concerns to the police.

=== Caroline Hogg ===
Five-year-old Caroline Hogg, Black's youngest known victim, disappeared while playing outside her Beach Lane home in the Edinburgh suburb of Portobello in the early evening of 8 July 1983. When she failed to return home by 7:15 p.m., her family searched the surrounding streets. A boy told them he had seen Caroline with a man on the nearby promenade, which they searched before calling the Lothian and Borders Police.

The ensuing search was the largest in Scottish history at the time, with 2,000 local volunteers and 50 members of the Royal Scots Fusiliers searching first Portobello, then expanding their scope to all of Edinburgh. By 10 July, Hogg's disappearance was headline news across Britain. Nine known paedophiles were identified as having been in Portobello on 8 July; all were eliminated from the inquiry.

Numerous eyewitnesses had seen an unkempt, balding, "furtive-looking" man wearing horn-rimmed glasses, watching Hogg as she played; then following her to a nearby fairground. En route, a 14-year-old girl named Jennifer Booth had seen Hogg sitting with this man on a bench. Booth overheard Hogg reply "Yes please" to some question posed to her by the man before the two walked to the fairground holding hands. There, the man paid 15 pence for Caroline to ride a carousel as he watched. A witness stated to police that as they left the fairground at about 7:30 p.m., Caroline seemed frightened.

Hogg remained in Black's van for at least 24 hours. Black delivered posters to Glasgow several hours after the abduction, and refuelled his van in Carlisle early the following morning.

On 18 July, Hogg's naked body was found in a ditch close to the M1 motorway in Twycross, 310 miles (500 km) from where she had been abducted and just 24 miles (39 km) from where Maxwell's body had been found the previous year. The precise cause of death could not be determined due to the extent of decomposition. Insect activity suggested the body had been placed where it was found on or after 12 July; Black had made a delivery to Bedworth on that date. The absence of clothing again suggested a sexual motive.

The following March, a televised reconstruction of the abduction was broadcast nationally. Appealing for witnesses to come forward, Hogg's father said: "You think it can never happen to you, but it has proven time and time again that it can, and it could again if this man isn't caught in the near future."

== Coordinated task force ==
After the discovery of Hogg's body, a conference of senior Staffordshire and Leicestershire detectives unanimously concluded that Hogg's and Maxwell's murderers were the same person, to a large degree because of the distance between the abduction and discovery sites.

Due to the distances involved, police suspected that the murderer of Maxwell and Hogg worked as a lorry or van driver, or a sales representative, which required him to travel extensively to places which included the Scottish Borders. Both girls had been bound and likely subjected to a sexual assault prior to the murders, and each had been wearing white ankle socks at the time of her abduction, which may have triggered a fetish in the perpetrator's psyche. Due to the geographical and circumstantial nature of the offences, the killer was most likely an opportunist.

Based upon the day of the week when Maxwell and Hogg had been abducted (a Friday), the killer was likely tied to a delivery or production schedule. Following the August 1982 discovery of Maxwell's body, numerous transport firms with links between Scotland and the Midlands of England were contacted, and drivers were questioned about their whereabouts on the date of her abduction. This line of inquiry was also followed after the discovery of Hogg's body, but in both instances failed to yield results.

Despite frustration at the lack of a breakthrough in their search for the murderer, there was complete cooperation between the detectives from the four police forces involved in the manhunt. Initially, a satellite incident room in Coldstream coordinated the efforts of the forces involved in the hunt for Maxwell's killer, with incident rooms in Leith and Portobello coordinating the search for Hogg's; within hours of Hogg's body being discovered, the chief constables of all forces now involved in investigating the murders agreed to appoint a senior investigating officer to coordinate the inquiries. Hector Clark, the assistant chief constable of Northumbria Police, took overall charge of the investigation, and established incident rooms in Northumberland and at Leith police station.

=== HOLMES database ===
All information relating to both murders was initially logged in a card filing system, which contained 500,000 index cards relating to the Maxwell case alone. Mindful of the criticisms of the recent investigation into the Yorkshire Ripper, which had become overwhelmed due to the volume of information filed in a card filing system, one of Clark's first decisions upon taking overall charge of the murder investigation was to use computer technology; he and other senior officers agreed that the most efficient way to cooperate in an investigation of this scope was to collate their information on the Hogg murder into a computerised database, which all forces involved in the manhunt could access. Information relating to Maxwell's murder was also later entered onto this database.

By January 1987, all information relating to the murders initially linked to Black was entered into the newly established HOLMES information technology system, with the £250,000 cost to implement it provided by the Home Office. Information continued to be entered into the database, and police forces nationwide could cross-check all the data. The database—based at the Child Murder Bureau in Bradford—expanded to hold information on over 189,000 people, 220,000 vehicles, and details of interviews held with over 60,000 people. Much of the information came through three confidential hotlines established in 1984. As a result of the investigation into the killings, several unrelated crimes, including offences relating to child abuse, were solved.

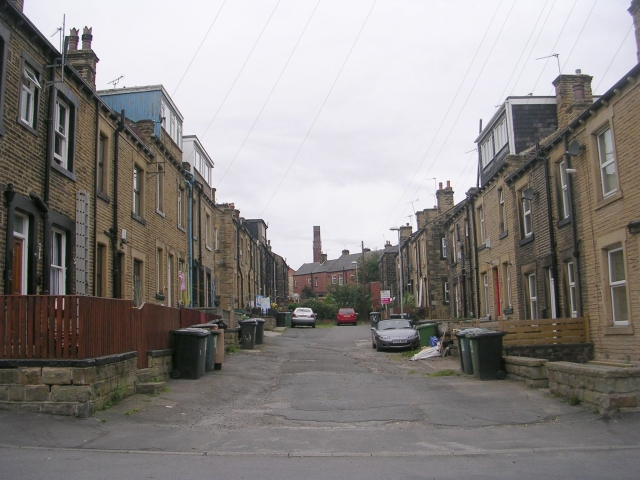
Brunswick Place, Morley. Sarah Harper is believed to have been abducted from one of the alleyways leading to this street on 26 March 1986.

== Sarah Harper murder ==
At about 7:50 p.m. on 26 March 1986, 10-year-old Sarah Jayne Harper disappeared from the Leeds suburb of Morley, having left her home to buy a loaf of bread from a corner shop 100 yards (91 metres) from her home. The owner of the shop confirmed that Harper had bought a loaf of Warburtons bread and two packets of crisps from her at approximately 7:55 pm—also returning two empty glass lemonade bottles to collect a 20 pence deposit—before leaving her shop. The shopkeeper also recollected that an overweight, balding man had briefly entered the shop moments after Harper, before leaving as she made her purchases.

Harper was last seen alive by two girls, walking into an alley leading towards her Brunswick Place home; when she had not returned by 8:20 pm, her mother, Jackie, and younger sister, Claire, briefly searched the surrounding streets, before Jackie Harper reported her daughter missing to West Yorkshire Police. Immediately, an extensive search was launched to find the child. Over 100 police officers were assigned full-time to the search, which saw house-to-house inquiries across Morley, over 3,000 properties searched, more than 10,000 leaflets distributed, and 1,400 witness statements obtained. A police search of the surrounding land was bolstered by 200 local volunteers, and a reservoir in nearby Tingley was searched by underwater units.

Extensive inquiries by West Yorkshire Police established that a white Ford Transit van had been in the area where Harper had been abducted. Two suspicious men had been seen loitering near the route Harper would have taken to the corner shop, and one of them was stocky and balding. Mindful of the possibility Harper had been abducted and murdered, West Yorkshire Police dispatched a telex to all forces nationwide, requesting that they search all locations where they had previously discovered child murder victims.

At a press conference on 3 April, Sarah's mother, Jackie, informed journalists that she feared her daughter was dead, and that the worst torment she and her family endured was the uncertainty. She made a direct appeal to her daughter's abductor to reveal the whereabouts of her daughter's body, stating: "I just want her back, even if she's dead. If someone would just pick up the phone and tell us where the body is."

Circular distributed by West Yorkshire Police following the discovery of Sarah Harper's body in the River Trent

On 19 April, a man discovered Sarah's partially dressed, gagged and bound body floating in the River Trent near Nottingham, 71 miles (114 km) from the site of her abduction. An autopsy showed she had died between five and eight hours after she was last seen alive, and that the cause of her death was drowning; injuries she had received to her face, forehead, head and neck had most likely rendered her unconscious prior to being thrown into the water. Harper had also been the victim of a violent and sustained sexual assault prior to being thrown into the river, causing perimortem internal injuries which were described by the pathologist as "simply terrible".

Days after Harper's body had been found, a further witness contacted West Yorkshire Police to say that at approximately 9:15 p.m. on 26 March, he had seen a white van with a stocky, balding man standing by the passenger door, parked close to the River Soar. As the Soar is a tributary to the Trent, and the description of the vehicle and driver matched those obtained from Morley residents, investigators took this eyewitness account seriously. Black refuelled his van in Newport Pagnell the following afternoon, and it is likely that he had driven Harper to Ratcliffe on Soar, and discarded her body in the Soar in the late evening of the date of her abduction, or the early hours of the following day.

Realising the likelihood that Harper's murderer had travelled on the M1 motorway prior to disposing of her body in the river, and that he would have had to refuel his vehicle as he made this journey, officers from both West Yorkshire and Nottinghamshire Police questioned staff and motorists at all service stations on the M1 motorway between Woolley, West Yorkshire and Trowell, Nottinghamshire, asking whether they had noted anything unusual on 26 or 27 March. Staff at one station had noted a white Transit van which had seemed out of place on the evening of 26 March, but could not give a clear description of the driver.

== Series of murders linked ==
Detective John Stainthorpe, head of the Leeds South Division of West Yorkshire Police, initially stated his doubt that Harper's disappearance was linked to those of Maxwell and Hogg: in one interview, he said that although he would not discount the possibility, he believed that Harper's abductor had close, personal connections with Morley. Upon the discovery of her body in the River Trent, he revised his opinion.

The nationwide abduction and body recovery locations of Black's victims. The abduction locations are denoted by red icons; the recovery locations by blue icons.

There were similarities between the murder of Sarah Harper and those of Maxwell and Hogg. All three were prepubescent, white girls, abducted with a sexual motive, and taken from public places in a vehicle. Their bodies were all dumped with little effort made to hide them, a considerable distance south from the sites of their abduction, within approximately 25 miles (40 km) of each other; this area became known as the "Midlands triangle".

Despite these similarities, investigators initially doubted whether Harper's murder should be linked to the murders of Maxwell and Hogg due to the differences in the circumstances of her abduction and the fact that she had been subjected to a serious sexual assault prior to her murder, whereas decomposition had erased any such clear traces on the bodies of the two previous victims. Harper had been abducted on a rainy Wednesday evening from a suburb in the north of England, wearing a hooded anorak covering much of her face, as opposed to being abducted on a summer Friday afternoon from a public place in southern Scotland while wearing summer clothing. Investigators remained open-minded as to whether Harper's murder had been committed by the same person, and telephone and computer connections were established between the incident room in the Leeds district of Holbeck and Leith. Harper's murder was formally linked to the series in November 1986.

=== National manhunt ===
Following the murder of Sarah Harper, with six police forces now involved in the hunt for the offender, the police forces involved agreed that Hector Clark (by this time Deputy Chief Constable of Lothian and Borders Police) should maintain overall command of the investigation. Clark created a new headquarters in Wakefield to act as a liaison between the six forces.

On 21 April 1986, Phillip Corbett, the head of the Metropolitan Police's Criminal Intelligence Branch, hosted a meeting at Scotland Yard, to discuss twenty unsolved child murders and abductions, dating back to the disappearance of Genette Tate in 1978, and which included the Maxwell, Hogg and Harper murders. Senior officers from sixteen British police forces attended. At this stage, the inquiry had cost in excess of a million pounds. One of the outcomes of this meeting was that investigators contacted the FBI to request a psychological profile of the murderer for British investigators. The FBI completed this profile in early 1988.

For the HOLMES database, investigators concluded only those with convictions for serious sexual offences against children would warrant further investigation. Those to be checked were to have been convicted of child murder, child abduction or attempted child abduction, or the indecent assault of a child. Every police force in Britain was asked to check their databases for people who had received convictions for any of these offences within ten years of the 1982 murder of Susan Maxwell. This narrowed the number of people to be checked to 40,000 men, and Black's name was not on the list, as his sole conviction had been in 1967.

"The abduction of this victim from a public area within walking distance of the victim's residence represents a desperate act by a man whose need for little children is greater than his fear of being exposed as a paedophile. He was relaxed and comfortable while "buying" the victim's favour in a public area, because he spends a great deal of time in such places watching and seeking out young victims."

— Section of the 1988 FBI psychological profile of Robert Black, pertaining to the abduction of Caroline Hogg.

In January 1988, the British investigators received the psychological profile of the killer from the FBI. This profile described the killer as a white male aged between 30 and 40 (likely closer to 40), who was a classic loner. This offender would be unkempt in appearance, and had received less than twelve years of formal education. He likely lived alone, in rented accommodation, in a lower-middle class neighbourhood. The profile also predicted that the motive for the killings was sexual, that the offender held a fixation with child pornography, that he retained souvenirs from his victims, and he most likely engaged in necrophilia with his victims' bodies shortly after their death, before disposing of them.

== Attempted abduction of Teresa Thornhill ==
On the afternoon of 24 April 1988, the attempted abduction of Teresa Thornhill occurred in the Nottingham district of Radford. Thornhill was aged 15, but was small and slightly built, which may have led Black to believe she was younger than her years. Nottinghamshire Police did not initially link the incident to the three child killings; as such, it was not reported to the national investigation, despite all chief constables in Britain being requested to report such incidents to the inquiry team.

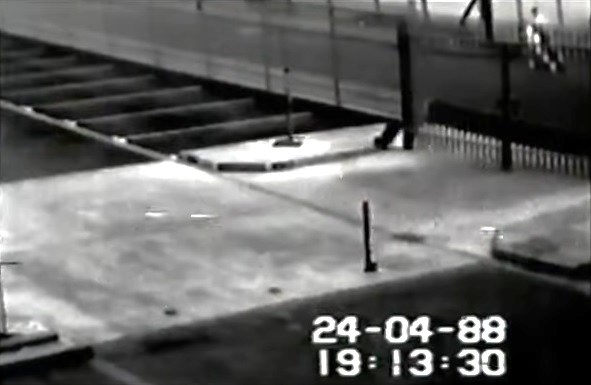
CCTV footage of Thornhill and Beeston (upper right), shortly after Black's attempted abduction of Thornhill

That evening, Thornhill had been at a park with her friend Andrew Beeston and others, before walking home with Beeston. The pair had parted company at the end of Norton Street when Thornhill noted a blue Transit van (Note: By 1988, Black had sold his white Transit van and purchased a blue vehicle of the same model.) slowing to a stop ahead of her; the driver got out, raised the van's bonnet and asked Thornhill, "Can you fix engines?" When Thornhill replied that she could not and began walking at a much brisker pace, Black grabbed her from behind and tried to carry her into the van.

Thornhill resisted, writhing and kicking as she attempted to free herself from what she later described as his "bear hug". As Black wrestled her to his van, Thornhill squeezed his testicles, causing him to loosen his grasp sufficiently for her to bite into his right forearm. Black shouted "Oh! You... bitch!", as Thornhill began to scream for her mother, wedging her feet on each side of the door frame as she struggled to resist being forced into the van. At the same time, Beeston ran towards the van, shouting "Let go of her, you fat bastard!" Upon hearing this, Black loosened his grip on Thornhill, who fell into the road, sobbing. Black ran towards the driver's seat of his van and quickly drove away.

Thornhill and Beeston ran to Thornhill's home and told her parents what had happened; they immediately reported the attempted abduction to Nottinghamshire Police, who questioned the teenagers. Both Thornhill and Beeston described her would-be abductor as an unkempt, overweight, balding and heavily built man aged between 40 and 50, and about 5 ft 7 in (175 cm) in height. Thornhill also informed investigators he had smelled of grime and sweat.

== Arrest ==
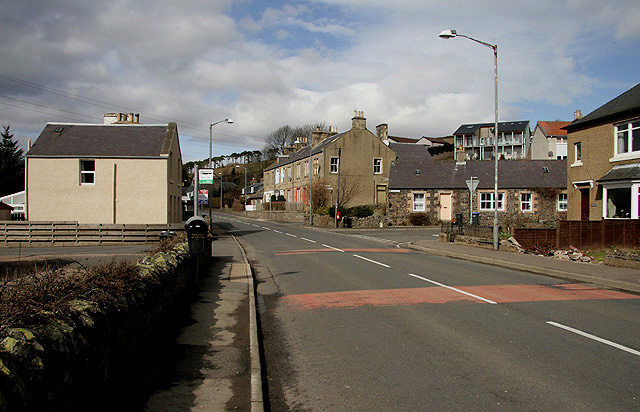
Galashiels Road, Stow. Black was arrested close to this location on 14 July 1990.

Black was arrested in the village of Stow in the Scottish Borders on 14 July 1990. David Herkes, a 53-year-old retired postmaster, was mowing his front garden when he saw a blue Transit van slow to a standstill across the road. The driver exited the van—ostensibly to clean his windscreen—as the six-year-old daughter of Herkes's neighbour passed his field of view. As Herkes stooped to clear grass cuttings from his lawnmower, he saw the girl's feet lifting from the pavement; he then straightened himself to observe the vehicle's driver hastily pushing something through the passenger door before clambering across to the driver's seat, closing the passenger door, and starting the engine.

Realising he had witnessed an abduction, Herkes noted the registration number of the van as it sped away. Herkes ran to the girl's home; the girl's mother called the police.

Within minutes, six police vehicles had arrived in the village. As Herkes described the van to officers, he observed it driving in their direction and exclaimed, "That's him! That's the same van!" An officer jumped in the van's path, forcing it to halt. Police removed the driver from his seat and handcuffed him.

One of the officers, who was the father of the abducted girl, opened the rear of the van and clambered inside, calling his daughter's name. Seeing movement in a sleeping bag, he untied its drawstring to discover his daughter inside, her wrists bound behind her back, her legs tied together, her mouth bound and gagged with sticking plaster, and a hood tied over her head.

En route to Selkirk police station, Black said: "It was a rush of blood to the head; I have always liked little girls since I was a lad. I tied her up because I wanted to keep her until I had dropped a parcel off. I was going to let her go." Although Black claimed he had interfered with his victim only "a little", a doctor found the child had been subjected to a serious digital sexual assault.

The girl was able to pinpoint the lay-by on the A7 where Black had sexually assaulted her. Black's intention had been to quickly make a final scheduled delivery to Galashiels before further abusing and almost certainly killing his victim.

=== Investigation and charges ===
At Selkirk police station, Black admitted to sexually assaulting the girl, saying he had not done more to her because he "didn't have much time". He was charged with abduction and remanded in custody. As Black awaited a scheduled 16 July Selkirk Sheriff court appearance, the detective superintendent—noting the similarities between the Stow abduction and the three child killings—notified Hector Clark of Black's arrest. On 16 July, Clark travelled from Wakefield to interview Black at Edinburgh's St Leonards police station. Although his answers in this brief interview were largely monosyllabic, Clark left feeling that Black was the man he had sought since 1982. At Black's initial remand hearing he was ordered to stand trial at Edinburgh High Court for the abduction of the Stow girl, and he was transferred to Saughton Prison.

A search of Black's van found restraining devices including assorted ropes, sticking plaster, and hoods; a Polaroid camera; numerous articles of girls' clothing; a mattress; and a selection of sexual aids. Black claimed that on his long-distance deliveries he would pull into a lay-by and dress in the children's clothing before masturbating.

At the request of Scottish detectives, Black's Stamford Hill lodgings were searched by the Metropolitan Police. This search yielded a large collection of child pornography in magazine, book, photographic and video format, including fifty-eight videos and films depicting graphic child sexual abuse which Black later claimed to have bought in continental Europe. Also found were several items of children's clothing, six pairs of spectacles, (Note: Two of these pairs of spectacles were later found to match those within the composite drawings produced of the suspect sought regarding the Hogg and Harper abductions.) a semen-stained copy of a Nottingham newspaper detailing the 1988 attempted abduction of Teresa Thornhill, and a variety of sex aids.

Black's appointed defence lawyer, Herbert Kerrigan QC, and the Edinburgh procurator fiscal both ordered psychiatric evaluations of Black, which were undertaken by prominent psychiatrists. Both reports were uncompromising regarding Black's deviancy and proclivities towards children. Black told Kerrigan he intended to plead guilty to the abduction charges.

== Abduction trial ==
On 10 August 1990, Black was tried at the Edinburgh High Court before Lord Donald MacArthur Ross for the abduction and sexual assault of the Stow schoolgirl. The trial lasted one day.

In his opening statement, Kerrigan stated his client would plead guilty to all charges. The Lord Advocate of Scotland, Lord Fraser of Carmyllie QC, then outlined the facts of the case, terming the implements found in Black's van a clear sign of premeditation, and citing a medical expert's testimony that the girl would likely have suffocated within fifteen minutes had she not been rescued.

Testimony was given that Black drove his victim to a lay-by to sexually abuse her, then returned through the village. In a statement read to the court, the victim stated she "didn't know [Black] was a bad man" as Black had stared at her before bundling her into his van.

In rebuttal, Kerrigan asserted again that the abduction had been unplanned, and that Black had intended to release the girl after assaulting her. He pointed out that Black freely admitted his paedophilic preferences and claimed to have successfully fought against the urge to abduct young girls prior to the incident at issue. He also said that Black accepted that he was a danger to children and wished to undergo treatment.

"The abduction of this little girl was carried out with a chilling, cold calculation. This was no 'rush of blood', as you have claimed. This is a very serious case; a horrific, appalling case ... You will go to prison for life, and your release will not be considered until such a time as it is safe to do so."

— Lord Donald MacArthur Ross pronouncing sentence on Robert Black for the abduction of the Stow schoolgirl. 10 August 1990.

=== Life imprisonment ===
Sentencing Black to life imprisonment for what he described as "a horrific, appalling case", Ross said he was greatly influenced by the opinion of the psychiatrists, who had concluded that Black was, and would remain, an extreme danger to children. Prior to imposing sentence, Ross praised David Herkes, whose vigilance had led to Black's arrest.

In September 1990, Black announced his intention to appeal against his life sentence, but he later abandoned this. In November 1990, he was transferred to Peterhead Prison.

== Further investigation ==
Two weeks after the Stow trial, Clark appointed Andrew Watt and Roger Orr to conduct a second, recorded interview with Black, with instructions that they were to tell Black that they would not be judgemental.

In the six-hour interview, Black freely discussed his early sexual experiences, his experimentation with various forms of self-abuse, and his attraction towards young children; he also described his penchant for wearing young girls' clothing, and admitted to having sexually assaulted in excess of 30 young girls between the 1960s and 1980s. He was largely uncommunicative in response to questions even loosely pertaining to any unsolved child murders and disappearances, but said he had enticed two young girls into his van in Carlisle upon the pretext of asking for directions in late 1985, then allowed them to leave when eyewitnesses appeared.

In the latter stages of the interview, both men steered their questioning to the subject of child abduction and murder, specifically in relation to the murder of Caroline Hogg. Informing Black that police had already established he had been in Portobello on the date of Hogg's abduction, Watt and Orr then tacitly informed him they had eyewitness accounts and petrol-station receipts, further proving that he was near Portobello on the date of Hogg's abduction. Orr then produced a composite drawing of the man with whom Hogg had left the funfair, placing this composite alongside photographs of Black dating from the early 1980s—highlighting their similarities. Black's replies then became evasive and monosyllabic. Asked directly, at the end of the interview, to confess to end the suffering of his victims' families, he did not respond.

Despite the information obtained in the interview doing little to advance the murder inquiry, afterwards Clark told his two colleagues: "That's our man. I'd bet my life on it."

=== Accumulation of evidence ===
Detectives from all forces in Britain linked to the joint manhunt then began an intense and painstaking effort to gather sufficient evidence to convince the Crown Prosecution Service to charge Black, with a reasonable chance of securing convictions. As was his legal right, Black refused to co-operate with the detectives in their investigation.

Investigators contacted Poster, Dispatch and Storage Ltd to establish whether travel records could confirm his whereabouts on crucial dates linked to the investigation. Staff at the firm were able to confirm that Black had always bought petrol using credit cards, the receipts of which he would then submit to his firm to claim expenses. These files, plus several historical delivery schedules, were still in the company's archives. Investigators discovered that Black had made scheduled delivery runs to the areas where the abductions had occurred on the relevant dates, and although the precise times he had been in the area were difficult to establish, petrol receipts confirmed he had bought fuel close to where each girl had been abducted on the date of her disappearance. For example, on the date of Sarah Harper's disappearance, Black had been scheduled to make a series of deliveries across the Midlands and Northern England. The two final deliveries on this schedule had been in West Yorkshire: one in Brighouse, then a final delivery in Morley at a firm 150 yards from Harper's home. Black had refuelled his van between these two destinations shortly before Harper had last been seen alive.

Investigators discovered that upon his return to London from his long-distance deliveries to Northern England or Scotland, Black had regularly slept overnight in a house in Donisthorpe in Leicestershire which belonged to his landlord's son. This was close to where all three bodies had been discovered. Leeds detectives also discovered that, on his regular deliveries to Morley, Black often slept in his van overnight in the premises to which he delivered, which was close to Sarah Harper's home.

Investigators learned that Poster, Dispatch and Storage Ltd had accounts with several oil companies, which allowed their drivers to buy fuel. With the cooperation of the companies, investigators obtained seven million credit card slips archived on microfiche detailing fuel purchases paid via this method at all of their premises between 1982 and 1986. These were sent to the reopened incident room in Newcastle upon Tyne, where a team of officers searched them for Black's distinctive signature in an effort to pinpoint when and where he had bought his fuel. This laborious task bore fruit: beginning in October 1990, investigators began to discover evidence of the precise times Black had paid for fuel at petrol stations close to each abduction site. In each instance, the time of purchase had been shortly before or after each child had been abducted.

By December 1990, the inquiry team decided they had sufficient circumstantial evidence to convince the Crown Prosecution Service (CPS) that there was a reasonable prospect of securing convictions against Black, although Clark was worried that the inquiry had not uncovered any forensic evidence to tie Black to the murders. All the evidence was submitted to the CPS in May 1991. In March 1992, CPS lawyers decided that the evidence was sufficient to try Black for the three murders and the attempted abduction of Teresa Thornhill. At a news conference on 11 March, Clark informed the press that "criminal proceedings have been issued on the authority of the Crown Prosecution Service against Robert Black".

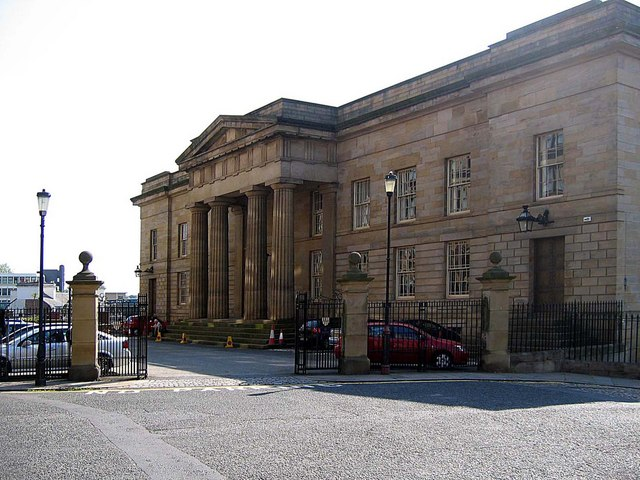
The Moot Hall. Black was brought to trial at this location on 13 April 1994.

== Murder trials ==
=== Maxwell, Hogg and Harper murders ===
Several pretrial hearings were held between July 1992 and March 1994. These hearings saw Black's defence counsel submit contentions that their client be tried on each count separately, and that the prosecution not be allowed to demonstrate any similarity between the modus operandi of each offence at the upcoming trial. In the penultimate pretrial hearing, in January 1994, Judge William Macpherson ruled against defence motions to try Black on each charge separately, and also ruled to allow the prosecution to submit similar fact evidence between the cases. This ruling allowed the prosecution to make these similarities between the cases known, and to introduce into evidence Black's recent conviction for the abduction and sexual assault of the Stow schoolgirl. The prosecution was prohibited from introducing into evidence the transcript of the August 1990 interview between Black and detectives Watt and Orr.

The trial began before Judge Macpherson on 13 April 1994 at the Moot Hall, Newcastle upon Tyne. Black pleaded not guilty to each of the ten charges of kidnap, murder, attempted kidnap, and preventing the lawful burial of a body.

In his opening statement on behalf of the Crown, prosecutor John Milford QC described the case to be tried as "every parent's nightmare" as he outlined the prosecution's contention that Robert Black had committed the three child murders and the attempted abduction, and the similarities between these offences and the 1990 abduction and sexual assault of the Stow schoolgirl for which Black was already serving a life sentence. Milford then described the circumstances of each abduction and murder for the jury; contending that each victim had remained alive in Black's van for several hours before her murder, and that each had been killed near the location Black had disposed of her body. In the latter stages of this five-hour opening statement, Milford contended that Black had kidnapped each victim for his own sexual gratification, and pointed out Black's extensive record of child sexual abuse and the paraphernalia discovered in his vehicle and at his London address. Milford closed his speech by stating that the petrol receipts and travel records would prove Black had been at all the abduction, attempted abduction and body recovery sites on the dates in question.

On the second day of the trial, the prosecution began to introduce witnesses, witness statements, circumstantial evidence, and forensic testimony. This saw witnesses describing the circumstances surrounding the abduction and subsequent discovery of each victim, and investigators describing the evidence uncovered of Black's movements on the dates of each abduction, the attempted abduction of Teresa Thornhill, and the kidnapping and assault of the Stow schoolgirl. Contemporary statements made by the mother of each murder victim at the time of her child's abduction were also read to the court, alongside testimony from the pathologists who had examined the bodies. Upon hearing the details of the kidnaps and murders, relatives of the three murder victims wept openly in court. Black rarely displayed any interest throughout the proceedings, typically remaining expressionless.

Several of these initial witnesses were subjected to intense cross-examination by Black's defence counsel, Ronald Thwaites, upon issues such as memory accuracy and minor discrepancies between times logged in record books at a firm to which Black had made a delivery on the date of Susan Maxwell's disappearance and those of petrol receipts introduced as evidence (this discrepancy was proven to be an administrative error), and earlier police statements given by the witnesses. Most witnesses maintained their insistence of the accuracy and honesty of their testimony.

One of the witnesses cross-examined on the third day of the trial was James Fraser, a forensic scientist, who had examined more than 300 items recovered from Black's van and his London lodgings; Fraser conceded that in over 1,800 microscopic comparisons, no forensic link had been established between Black and the three victims. In direct re-examination by John Milford, Fraser said that the interval between the offences and Black's arrest, and the fact Black had only bought the van in which he was arrested in 1986, would make establishing a forensic link between the three murders unlikely.

The final prosecution witnesses to testify were detectives from the police forces involved in the manhunt; they testified on 29 April, and much of their testimony described the scope of the investigation while Black had been at large, and the painstaking inquiries to gather evidence. The final detective to testify was Hector Clark, who testified that Black's name had never been entered into the HOLMES database during the manhunt due to his conviction pre-dating the timescale of those judged to warrant further investigation. Clark further explained he could not recall any other cases where children had been abducted, killed and their bodies transported considerable distances, before stating: "I don't believe there has been a bigger crime investigation in the United Kingdom, ever."

On 4 May, Ronald Thwaites began to outline his case in defence of Black. Thwaites reminded the jury the police had been unsuccessfully investigating these crimes for eight years before Black's 1990 arrest and conviction for the Stow abduction, and asserted that the investigators had seized on this case in an attempt to scapegoat his client to appease their feelings of "frustration and failure", and in an effort to restore broken reputations. Thwaites claimed that, although the paraphernalia introduced into evidence attested to his client's admitted obsession with paedophilic material, no direct evidence existed to prove Black had progressed from molester to murderer. Describing his decision not to permit Black to testify on his own behalf in relation to the petrol receipts and travel records, Thwaites informed the jury: "No man can be expected to remember the ordinary daily routine of his life going back many years." Thwaites then began to introduce witnesses to testify on behalf of the defence, and continued to do so until 10 May.

To support Thwaites' contention that the three murders were not part of a series and had not been committed by Black, much of the testimony delivered by the defence witnesses referred to sightings of alternative suspects and suspicious vehicles near each abduction. The evidence delivered by these eyewitnesses contradicted that of those who had earlier testified on behalf of the prosecution. For example, Thomas Ball testified that on the date of Susan Maxwell's abduction, he had observed a girl matching her description striking a maroon Triumph saloon with a tennis racket. This car had contained at least two men, and the location Ball had seen this incident was very close to the site of Maxwell's abduction.

==== Closing arguments ====
On 12 May, both counsel delivered their closing arguments to the jury. Prosecutor John Milford argued first, opening his final address to the jury by describing the circumstances of Black's 1990 arrest and recounting the extensive circumstantial evidence presented throughout the trial, and emphasising the fact no physical evidence existed due to the interval between the offences and Black's arrest. In reference to the defence argument that Black's close proximity to each of the abduction and body disposal sites of the dates in question was mere coincidence, Milford stated that if this defence contention were true, it would be "the coincidence to end all coincidences". Milford then requested that the jury reach a guilty verdict.

Thwaites delivered his closing arguments on behalf of the defence. He began by asking the jury: "Where is the jury that will acquit a pervert of multiple murder?" before describing his client as someone against whom ample prejudice existed, but no hard evidence. Thwaites pressed upon the jury the necessity to differentiate between a child sex pervert and an alleged child killer, before attacking the credibility of several prosecution witnesses, and pouring particular scorn upon the nationwide manhunt, stating: "The police have become exhausted in not finding anyone; the public are clamouring for a result. What good are you if you can't catch a child killer? The police were under continuing, unbearable pressure, then they find Mr Black. Is he their salvation, or a convenient, expendable scapegoat?" Thwaites then referred to defence witness testimony which indicated someone else had committed the three murders, before resting his case.

Judge Macpherson delivered his final instructions to the jury on 16 May and the following morning. In his final address, Judge Macpherson implored the jury to discard any emotion or personal distaste for Black's extensive history of sexual offences against children when considering their verdict, and not to prejudge his guilt because of his 1990 conviction for the abduction and sexual assault of the Stow schoolgirl. Judge Macpherson further directed the jury to instead focus on the evidence presented at the trial and decide whether the "interlocking similarities" between the cases presented were sufficient to convince them of Black's guilt, before reminding them that any conclusions of guilt on one charge must not determine guilt on the remaining nine charges they were to debate. The jury then received strict instructions against reading newspapers, watching television or making any telephone calls, before retiring to consider their verdict. These deliberations continued for two days.

==== Conviction and sentencing ====
On 19 May 1994, the jury found Black guilty of three counts of kidnapping, three counts of murder, three counts of preventing the lawful burial of a body and—in relation to Teresa Thornhill—one count of attempted abduction. He was sentenced to a term of life imprisonment for each of these counts, with a recommendation that he serve a minimum of 35 years on each of the three murder charges. These life sentences were to be served concurrently. Passing sentence, Judge Macpherson described Black as being the perpetrator of "offences which are unlikely ever to be forgotten and which represent a man at his most vile".

Black remained unmoved upon hearing this sentence, but as he prepared to leave the dock, he turned to the detectives present who had been involved in his manhunt and said "Tremendous. Well done, boys." This statement caused several of the detectives to weep. Black was then taken to Wakefield prison, to begin his sentence in the segregation unit, as a Category A prisoner.

Immediately following these convictions, the more than twenty detectives involved in the manhunt who had been present at his sentencing addressed the press assembled outside the Moot Hall, with Hector Clark stating: "The tragedy is these three beautiful children who should never have died. Black is the most evil of characters and I hope there is not now or ever another one like him." When asked his personal feelings towards Robert Black, Clark stated: "Black is a man of the most evil kind, but no longer important to me. I care not about him."

=== Cardy murder ===
On 15 December 2009, Black was summoned to appear at Armagh Crown Court in Northern Ireland to answer charges relating to the 1981 murder of Jennifer Cardy. He was formally charged the following day.

Black appeared at Armagh Crown Court, charged with the sexual assault and murder of Cardy, on 22 September 2011. He was tried before Judge Ronald Weatherup, and acknowledged that he may have been in Northern Ireland on the date of Cardy's abduction, but pleaded not guilty to the charges.

Circumstantial evidence attesting to Black's guilt of Cardy's murder had been obtained by Northern Ireland investigators searching through petrol receipts—560,000 in total—stored in his former employer's archives, to ascertain Black's whereabouts on the dates surrounding the abduction and murder. Black's trial began with the prosecutor, Toby Hedworth, stating that the discovery of Black's signature upon these receipts was as good as signing his own confession.

On the second day of the trial, prosecutors introduced into evidence petrol receipts proving he had been near Ballinderry on the date of Cardy's abduction. Further evidence presented at trial included a salary ledger proving Black had been paid £50, which had only been given to drivers from his firm who made deliveries to Northern Ireland, and an order book confirming a delivery of billboard posters had been due to take place near Ballinderry on the date of the abduction. Black was one of only two employees of Poster Dispatch and Storage Ltd willing to travel to Northern Ireland, due to the Troubles, and travel records from all other drivers employed at this firm eliminated them from any culpability on the date of Cardy's abduction. The records also showed that, on the night of the abduction, Black had boarded an overnight ferry from Northern Ireland to Liverpool, before refuelling his van in Coventry the following day, en route to London.

In an effort to discredit the prosecution's contention that Black had been making deliveries to Ireland, Black's defence counsel, David Spens, suggested on the fourth day of the trial the Coventry petrol receipt could only indicate Black had been making deliveries to Coventry on the day after Cardy's murder; in rebuttal, prosecutor Hedworth questioned a colleague of Black's, who confirmed the firm did not make deliveries to Coventry in the early 1980s.

To further support the prosecution's contention that Cardy's murder had been committed by Black, Nathaniel Cary, a forensic pathologist, testified on the eleventh day of the trial to the similarities between Cardy's abduction and murder, and that of Sarah Harper. Cary testified that the circumstances of the two girls' deaths were "remarkably similar", and that the injuries inflicted upon both girls' bodies strongly suggested both girls had been alive, albeit likely unconscious, when their bodies had been placed in water.

==== Conviction and sentencing ====
On 27 October 2011, he was found guilty of Cardy's abduction, sexual assault and murder. The trial lasted six weeks, and the jury deliberated for four hours before delivering their verdict. Black was given a further life sentence, with hearings deferred on the minimum term to be served.

On 8 December, Judge Weatherup imposed a minimum term of twenty-five years, informing Black that he would be at least 89 years old before he would be considered for release. Weatherup informed Black: "Your crime was particularly serious; you subjected a vulnerable child to unpardonable terror and took away her life." Prior to his final sentencing for this fourth murder, Black's defence lawyer, David Spens, offered no plea for mercy for his client, stating that the case in question was "one of those rare cases in which there is no mitigation, and so I propose to say nothing in that regard."

== Aftermath ==
The eight-year, nationwide inquiry which culminated in the 1990 arrest of Robert Black proved to be one of the longest, most exhaustive and costly British murder investigations ever. By the time investigators had amassed enough evidence to convince the Crown Prosecution Service to charge Black with the three child murders and the attempted abduction of Thornhill, the dossier they had assembled was estimated to weigh twenty-two tonnes. The total cost of the inquiry is estimated to be £12 million.

Robert Black appealed against his 1994 convictions. His appeal was heard before Lord Taylor at the Court of Appeal on 20 February 1995. Black contended he had been denied a fair trial due to details of his 1990 abduction and sexual assault charges being introduced as similar fact evidence at his trial, a ruling his defence counsel had fundamentally objected to. Black also contended that the final instructions delivered to the jury by Judge Macpherson had been unbalanced. Black's appeal hearing had been expected to last three days, but at the end of the first day, Lord Taylor refused leave to appeal the conviction on the grounds that Black's trial had been fair, and that none of his contentions could be substantiated.

In July 1995, Black was attacked in his cell at Wakefield prison by two fellow inmates, who threw boiling water mixed with sugar over him, bludgeoned him with a table leg, then stabbed him in the back and neck with an improvised knife. Black sustained superficial wounds, burns and bruising in this attack; his attackers were jailed for three further years after admitting wounding Black with intent to cause grievous bodily harm.

Black never admitted responsibility in any of the murders of which he was convicted or suspected, and refused to cooperate with investigators, despite having little hope of ever being freed. According to Ray Wyre, a pioneer in the treatment of sex offenders who conducted several interviews with Black between 1990 and 1993, the prime reason for this was an issue of control for Black. Wyre summarised the psychology behind Black's refusal to cooperate with investigators:

He's the sort of person for whom it's all about power and control. Having information about what he's done gives him power. He has no desire to ease his conscience, and he's not going to give up the one thing that gives him power over the pain that his victims' families are suffering.

The closest Black ever came to confessing to any of his crimes was shortly before his 1994 trial, when Wyre asked why he had never denied any of the charges brought against him. According to Wyre, Black replied, "Because I couldn't."

== Death ==
Black died from a heart attack at HMP Maghaberry on 12 January 2016, at the age of 68. His body was cremated at Roselawn Crematorium, outside Belfast, on 29 January. No family or friends were present at this service. In this short service, the Presbyterian chaplain of HMP Maghaberry, the Reverend Rodney Cameron, read a section of Psalm 90. Black's ashes were scattered at sea in February 2016.

== Suspected victims ==
Police believe that Black had committed more murders than the four for which he was convicted, with senior detectives believing the true number of victims he had killed to be at least eight. In July 1994, a meeting was convened between senior detectives from the six police forces involved in the nationwide manhunt for Black, and representatives from other British forces with unsolved missing child and child murder cases. The meeting assessed the evidence investigators had assembled to establish whether Black had killed other children.

In 2008, the Crown Prosecution Service stated that insufficient evidence existed to charge Black with any further murders. Black has been linked to at least fourteen further child murders and disappearances in the UK, Ireland, France, Germany and the Netherlands, committed between 1969 and 1989.

=== United Kingdom ===
8 April 1969: April Fabb (13). Fabb was last seen cycling from Metton, Norfolk towards her sister's home in Roughton, Norfolk. Her bicycle was found in a field on the route she had taken, but her body has never been found.

21 May 1973: Christine Markham (9). A Scunthorpe schoolgirl last seen walking to school. Her body has never been found. Black was questioned about potential involvement in her abduction in 2004, although police do not consider him a strong suspect in this case.

19 August 1978: Genette Tate (13). Abducted while delivering newspapers in Aylesbeare, Devon. Her bicycle was found in a country lane by two girls she had spoken to minutes before, but her body has never been found. Black made numerous deliveries of posters to the south-west of England in 1978. At the time of Black's death, the Devon and Cornwall Police were due to submit a fresh file to the Crown Prosecution Service, seeking formal abduction and murder charges in relation to this case. (Note: In several recorded interviews conducted with Dr. Ray Wyre in the early 1990s, Black disclosed extensive knowledge of the precise scene and circumstances from which Tate was abducted.)

28 July 1979: Suzanne Lawrence (14). Lawrence was last seen leaving her sister's home in Harold Hill, northeast London. Although her body has never been found, Lawrence's name was added to a list of Black's possible victims in July 1994. Her case has also been linked to Peter Tobin.

16 June 1980: Patricia Morris (14). Disappeared from the grounds of her comprehensive school; her fully clothed body was found in Hounslow Heath two days after her disappearance. She had been strangled with a ligature, but had not been raped. Although Levi Bellfield has claimed to have murdered Morris, he was barely twelve years old at the time of her death, and police doubt he is the perpetrator.

4 November 1981: Pamela Hastie (16). Her bludgeoned and strangled body was found in Rannoch Woods in Johnstone, Renfrewshire, in November 1981. Hastie had also been raped. One eyewitness was adamant he had seen a man matching Black's description running from the crime scene, but police do not believe Black was near Renfrewshire at the time of Hastie's murder.

=== Ireland ===
18 March 1977: Mary Boyle (6). A Kincasslagh schoolgirl who disappeared while visiting her grandparents in Ballyshannon, County Donegal. She was last seen near her grandmother's house at Cashelard, near Ballyshannon, County Donegal on 18 March 1977. Black is known to have been in County Donegal at the time of Boyle's disappearance, being charged with after-hours drinking in Annagry. One eyewitness report states a woman had heard whimpering sounds emanating from a van parked outside a Dungloe pub on this date. Boyle's body has never been found.

=== West Germany ===
20 June 1985: Silke Garben (10). Garben was a Detmold schoolgirl who disappeared on her way to a dental appointment. Her body was found in a stream close to a British Army base near to her home the day after her disappearance. Garben had been violently sexually assaulted and strangled, although she died of drowning. Black is known to have made a delivery of posters to this British Army base on the date of Garben's disappearance.

11 May 1989: Ramona Herling (11). Last seen walking to a swimming complex just 500 yards from her home in the town of Bad Driburg. Her body has never been found.

=== Netherlands ===
5 August 1986: Cheryl Morriën (7). Morriën disappeared as she walked to her friend's home in the Dutch city of IJmuiden. Her body has never been found. Black made regular trips to nearby Amsterdam to buy child pornography. He is considered a strong suspect in this case.

=== France ===
5 May 1987: Virginie Delmas (10). Abducted from Neuilly-sur-Marne on 5 May 1987. Her nude body was found in a Mareuil-les-Meaux orchard on 9 October, with her clothes folded beside her. Delmas had been strangled; the extent of decomposition prevented the pathologist from determining whether she had been raped before death. Black is known to have made several deliveries in and around Paris on the date of Delmas's disappearance.

30 May 1987: Hemma Greedharry (10). A Malakoff schoolgirl, originally from Mauritius. Her body was discovered in a parking lot in Châtillon two hours after she was last seen walking home from a bookshop. Greedharry had been raped and strangled, and her body set alight. Black is known to have regularly travelled upon the road where Greedharry's body was found when making deliveries in northern France.

3 June 1987: Perrine Vigneron (7). Vigneron disappeared on her way to buy a Mother's Day card in Bouleurs en route to attending a pottery course; her strangled body was discovered in a rapeseed field in Chelles on 27 June, with her clothes folded neatly beside her. A white van had been seen in Bouleurs on the day of Vigneron's disappearance.

27 June 1987: Sabine Dumont (9). A Paris schoolgirl last seen alive in Bièvres on 27 June, walking home from a bookshop. Her strangled and sexually assaulted body was found the following day in the commune of Vauhallan. Black was named as a prime suspect in Dumont's murder in 2011. A DNA sample of Dumont's killer was recovered from her clothing in 1999, but this sample has never been compared to Black.

== Television ==
Several television programmes have been made about Black.

- Scottish Television broadcast a 25-minute documentary relating to Black's crimes on the date of his 1994 murder convictions. It contains interviews with Hector Clark, David Herkes and Ray Wyre, and archive footage dating from the manhunt for Black.
- Channel 4 commissioned a 40-minute documentary, The Death of Childhood: Unspeakable Truths, first broadcast in May 1997. This focuses on the life and crimes of Black. It includes interviews with various participants involved in his manhunt.
- Child killer: The Truth was commissioned by ITV as part of their true crime series, Manhunt. This 45-minute documentary was first broadcast in December 2001, and focuses upon the challenges faced by investigators throughout the manhunt. Hector Clark, Jackie Harper and the father of the Stow schoolgirl Black abducted in 1990 are interviewed in this documentary.
- A 45-minute Crime & Investigation documentary focusing on the crimes of Black was released in 2010. This episode features interviews with forensic psychiatrist Julian Boon.
- Channel 5 broadcast an episode relating to Black's crimes within the true crime documentary series Killers Behind Bars: The Untold Story. This 40-minute episode is narrated by criminologist David Wilson.
- The BBC current affairs series Spotlight broadcast a 45-minute documentary on Black on 23 February 2016. This episode, entitled Robert Black: Caught on Tape, includes audio recordings of interviews with Black.
- The Child Snatcher: Manhunt. Commissioned by Channel 5, this two-part documentary was broadcast in August 2023.

== See also ==
- List of serial killers by number of victims
- List of serial killers in the United Kingdom
