= Disappearance of Genette Tate =

Unsolved 1978 missing person case

Genette Tate
- A photograph of Tate distributed at the time of her disappearance in August 1978
- Born: Genette Louise Tate; 5 May 1965
- Disappeared: 19 August 1978 (age 13); Aylesbeare, Devon, England
- Status: Missing for 47 years, 10 months and 12 days
- Height: 5 ft 0 in (1.52 m)
- Parents: John Tate (father); Sheila Cook (mother)

The disappearance of Genette Tate is a missing person case involving a 13-year-old girl who vanished while delivering newspapers in Aylesbeare, Devon, on 19 August 1978. Despite extensive searches, her body has never been found and the cause of her disappearance remains unknown.

The case is one of Britain's longest-running missing person inquiries and has been described by Devon and Cornwall Police as a murder investigation. Tate's disappearance remains one of Britain's best-known unresolved cases.

== Early life ==
Genette Louise Tate was born in Taunton, Somerset, on 5 May 1965. She was the only child born to John and Sheila Tate. At the time of Genette's birth, the Tate family lived in the Taunton suburb of Wedlands. They relocated briefly to Cornwall before moving to Devon.

Genette's parents separated when she was young, and her father remarried. She lived with her father, stepmother Violet, and stepsister Tania at Barton Farm Cottage in the East Devon village of Aylesbeare, (Note: The total population of Aylesbeare in 1978 was fewer than 500 people.) 8 miles (13 km) east of Exeter. After her parents' separation, Genette maintained regular contact with her mother.

== Disappearance ==
Tate disappeared while delivering newspapers shortly after 3:30 pm (BST) on Saturday 19 August 1978. At approximately 3:28 pm, two schoolfriends saw Tate walking along Withen Lane, pushing her bicycle. Tate had delivered fourteen newspapers by this point, and conversed briefly with her friends as they ascended the lane. At the top of the hill, Tate mounted her bicycle and rode ahead as her friends paused to read an article in the newspaper they had been given. She would not typically have performed this newspaper round, and had agreed to do the job for one week as the paper boy who normally did the round was on holiday. Tate was wearing a white cotton T-shirt with her name embroidered in red letters on the left shoulder, light brown trousers, and white plimsolls.

Seven minutes later, the two girls discovered Tate's bicycle lying in the middle of the road. Several newspapers she had been scheduled to deliver were scattered across the tarmac.

Approximately 25 minutes after the discovery, Tate's parents returned to Barton Farm Cottage from a shopping trip to Exeter. The girls had Tate's bicycle with them, and asked if she was at home. When Tate's father said that his daughter was not at home, he and her mother, assisted by several friends and neighbours, began a search around Within Road for Tate. At 5 pm, John Tate reported his daughter missing to Devon and Cornwall Police.

Map of Devon, showing the location of Tate's disappearance

== Investigation ==
Within hours of Tate's disappearance, police mounted an extensive search. Seventy uniformed policemen and fifty detectives from Devon and Cornwall Police, assisted by mounted officers from Avon and Somerset Police, were assigned to the search. All ponds in the Aylesbeare area were searched by underwater search units, and search dogs assisted police in their search of surrounding terrain. (Note: The search for Genette Tate would prove to be the most extensive search for a missing person in the history of Devon and Cornwall Police.)

Devon and Cornwall Police discounted the possibility of Tate running away from home, as at the time of her disappearance she had no personal possessions with her beyond the clothing she was wearing. She had also left behind in her bedroom money she had been saving for an upcoming family holiday. The money collected from the customers on her newspaper round was still in her purse on the bicycle. The possibility of a hit-and-run traffic accident was also ruled out, as no tyre marks were found on the road and her bicycle was undamaged. Kidnapping was initially considered a possibility, although both Devon and Cornwall Police and Tate's family gradually discounted this possibility.

Eyewitnesses reported seeing a maroon Triumph or similar vehicle upon Within Road at around the time of the disappearance, and police issued a photofit picture of a man they wanted to question in relation to the incident. This man was described as being a "very handsome" individual in his early 20s with a pale complexion, short dark hair, who had been wearing a light-coloured shirt.

Despite the police investigation and a search of the surrounding countryside involving thousands of volunteers, Tate's disappearance remains unexplained. In 2002, DNA belonging to Tate was found on one of her jumpers kept by her mother, which would allow her body to be identified if discovered. On the 25th anniversary of the case in 2003, Genette's parents both stated their belief that she is no longer alive. Police have amassed more than 20,000 index cards in a filing system related to the case, which is stored at the Devon and Cornwall Police headquarters in Exeter.

== Robert Black as the prime suspect ==
Robert Black, a serial killer convicted in 1994 for similar crimes involving the abduction and murder of young girls, was questioned by Devon and Cornwall Police in connection with the Tate case. During the course of his job as a long distance delivery van driver in the 1970s, Black had made deliveries in the Exeter area. In 1996, an eyewitness claimed to have seen a vehicle of the model Black is known to have driven in 1978 at Exeter Airport on the day of Genette's disappearance. The police inquiries were unable to establish that Black had been in Aylesbeare on the day of the disappearance. (Note: In several recorded interviews conducted with a pioneering expert in the treatment of child sex offenders named Dr. Ray Wyre in the early 1990s, Black had disclosed extensive knowledge of the precise scene and circumstances from which Tate was abducted.)

The Crown Prosecution Service decided in August 2008 that insufficient evidence existed to charge Black with Tate's murder. After Black's conviction in 2011 for the murder of Jennifer Cardy in 1981, a spokesman for the Police Service of Northern Ireland commented on the "striking similarities" between the murder of Cardy and the disappearance of Tate.

Devon and Cornwall Police reviewed the case in June 2014 in the hope of finding sufficient real evidence to prosecute Black. At the time of his death in January 2016, Devon and Cornwall Police were five weeks from submitting a file to the Crown Prosecution Service in which they sought a new decision on whether to prosecute him. The file was submitted in April 2016, and the Crown Prosecution Service said that due to Black's death, there would be no posthumous decision to charge him with Tate's murder.

In August 2018, on the eve of the 40th anniversary of his daughter's disappearance, John Tate made a further plea for information about the case, saying, "I am not even 100% sure Black did it. I need proof that Black killed her." He said that his rapidly declining health meant that he could no longer make his annual trip from Manchester to Aylesbeare, and that his final wish was to give his daughter a dignified Christian burial and to be buried alongside her. He died in April 2020, aged 77, with the case still unsolved.

== See also ==
- Child abduction
- Disappearance of April Fabb
- List of people who disappeared mysteriously (1970s)
