= Nutwalls =

Hamlet in Devon, England

Coordinates: 50.710°N 3.361°W

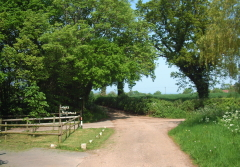
- Lower Nutwalls Farm.

- Location within Devon
- OS grid reference: SY040909
- Shire county: Devon
- Region: South West
- Country: England
- Sovereign state: United Kingdom
- Post town: EXETER
- Postcode district: EX5
- Dialling code: 01395
- Police: Devon and Cornwall
- Fire: Devon and Somerset
- Ambulance: South Western
- UK Parliament: Honiton and Sidmouth

Nutwalls is a hamlet in Devon, England. It is located 9 miles (14 km) south-east of Exeter, close to Aylesbeare.

Two cottages built in the 18th century are listed buildings.
