= Hector Clark =

English police detective (1934–2021)

Hector Goodfellow Clark QPM OBE (4 April 1934 – 5 April 2021) was an English police detective noted for his pioneering use of computerised police records in the 1980s. Clark's implementation of the new technology led to the conviction of serial child killer Robert Black.

Clark was born in Felton, Northumberland, to George Clark and Katherine Robson, and was a talented footballer. He underwent his National Service with the Royal Air Force and in 1955 joined the Northumberland County Constabulary. In the 1987 New Year Honours, he was awarded the Queen's Police Medal while serving as Deputy Chief Constable, Lothian and Borders Police. He was appointed an Officer of the Order of the British Empire in the 1994 Birthday Honours.

In 1957, he married nurse Anne Staveley, with whom he had a son, Andrew. He retired in 1994 on his 60th birthday. He died in Whitley Bay, the day after his 87th birthday.
