= Mill Hill Mill, Roughton =

Windmill in Roughton, Norfolk, England

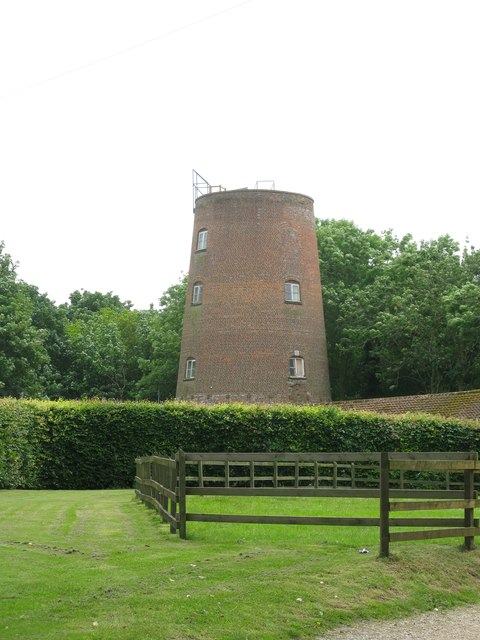
- Mill Hill Mill, June 2014
- Interactive map of Mill Hill Mill, Roughton

Origin
- Mill name: Mill Hill Mill
- Mill location: Roughton, Norfolk, United Kingdom
- Grid reference: TG 2162 3923
- Coordinates: 52°52′19″N 1°17′41″E
- Year built: 1814

Information
- Purpose: Corn mill
- Type: Tower mill
- Storeys: Six storeys
- No. of sails: Four
- Type of sails: Patent sails
- Windshaft: Cast iron
- Winding: Fantail
- Fantail blades: Eight
- No. of pairs of millstones: Three pairs

Mill Hill Mill is a Grade II listed tower mill in Roughton, Norfolk. It was built in 1814 and worked until 1906 when it was destroyed by fire. The empty tower survives, used as a Scout headquarters.

== History ==
A post mill was shown on Ogilby's Britannica of 1674. Two post mills were for sale in January 1767. They were bought by Robert Joy, who died in 1794 and his widow Mary carried on the business. Only one mill is shown on Faden's 1797 map of Norfolk. Robert Joy's brother Edmund was listed as miller in 1802. Mrs. Joy handed the business to her son Robert Bourne Joy in 1814.

He had the post mill demolished and a tower mill built in its place, employing Edmund Joy as miller. Edmund died in 1833. Mary Joy died on 17 October 1847. Robert Bourne Joy ran the mill until his death on 8 September 1863. His daughter Sarah Ivy Joy ran the mill until 1867. It was offered for sale or lease in August 1867. The mill later became part of the Bond-Crabell estate. Frank Brown was the miller from 1872 to 1879, followed by Edward Harvey in 1883. The mill was later run by the Press family, who ran two mills in Great Yarmouth, Norfolk - Greencap Mill and the High Mill, Southtown. Edward Albert Press was the miller in 1888, Press Bros. from 1890 to 1892, Press & Pallett from 1896 to 1900 and Frederick William Press from 1904 to 1906. When the High Mill, Southtown was demolished in 1905, two sails were transferred to Mill Hill Mill. The mill was tailwinded on 17 September 1906. It caught fire and was burnt out. The granary survived, but was subsequently demolished.

The empty tower was used for breeding poultry from 1916 to 1925. In 1978, plans were made to convert the mill to serve as headquarters for the North Norfolk District 1st Scout Group. The foundation stone for a new building on the site of the granary was laid on 9 July 1978 by Sir William Gladstone. The mill was listed Grade II on 28 January 1988. In 2008, the scouts, who leased the mill on a peppercorn rent, bought the mill for £200,000.

== Description ==
Mill Hill Mill is a six-storey tower mill. The tower is 56 feet 0 inches (17.07 m) tall. It had a domed cap. A cast iron windshaft carried four double Patent sails, which had ten bays of three shutters. The mill was winded by an eight-bladed fantail. It drove three pairs of stones.
