= Aylesbeare =

- Village and civil parish
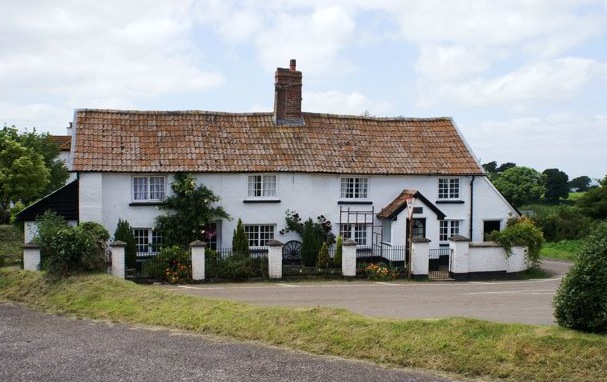
- Crossways Cottage at Aylesbeare
- Interactive map of Aylesbeare
- Coordinates: 50°43′13″N 3°21′55″W
- Country: England
- County: Devon
- District: East Devon

Area
  - Total: 2,948 acres (1,193 ha)

Population (2001)
  - Total: 527
  - Density: 114/sq mi (44.2/km^{2})

Aylesbeare is a village and civil parish in the East Devon district of Devon, England, 8 miles (13 km) east of Exeter. According to the 2001 census, the parish, which includes the hamlet of Nutwalls, had a population of 527. Known for the Site of Special Scientific Interest on Aylesbeare Common that is managed by the Royal Society for the Protection of Birds, Aylesbeare was in the news during 1978 as the scene of the unresolved disappearance of the schoolgirl Genette Tate.

Aylesbeare is on the northern side of the East Devon Pebblebed Heaths. Locally known as Woodbury Common, the heathlands are made up of eight parish commons, including Aylesbeare Common.

== History ==
Aylesbeare has a long, but lightly recorded, history. Tumuli on Aylesbeare Common indicate that the area was inhabited in prehistoric times. By the time of the Domesday Book in 1086, the village was known as Ailesbergon though, in common with many place names, it had many spellings over the years, including Aillesbir and Ailesberga.

The oldest building in the parish is the church, dedicated to the Blessed Virgin Mary. It dates to the 13th century. Gregory was the first recorded incumbent, in 1261. The church has been rebuilt and restored many times – in the 14th century, a major refurbishment in 1899 and a new roof in 2004.

Aylesbeare made national headlines in August 1978 after the disappearance of 13-year-old Genette Tate, who lived in the village. She has never been found. In 2016, the police announced that they believed serial killer Robert Black to be responsible, but could not charge him as he had since died.

== Geography, geology and environment ==
From the highest point of the parish 512 feet (156 m) on the Common, the land gradually falls away to the northwest reaching its lowest point of 98 feet (30 m) near Exeter International Airport. With an area of 2,948 acres (1,193 ha), Aylesbeare is slightly below the average for a Devon parish. The village gives its name to a sequence of mudstone and sandstone rocks of Triassic age, the Aylesbeare Mudstone Group which occurs from the east Devon coast northwards into Somerset.

Although the population is widely distributed around the parish, it clusters in Aylesbeare Village itself, the hamlets of Rosamundford and Withen, and small groups of houses on the site of former farm buildings.

== Economy ==
Originally a farming parish, Aylesbeare still has two working farms within the village itself with many others spread throughout the parish. However, agriculture is no longer the main source of employment, with many people working in Exeter and surrounding towns.
