= Metton, Norfolk =

Village in Norfolk, England

Coordinates: 52.88829°N 1.26748°E

Metton
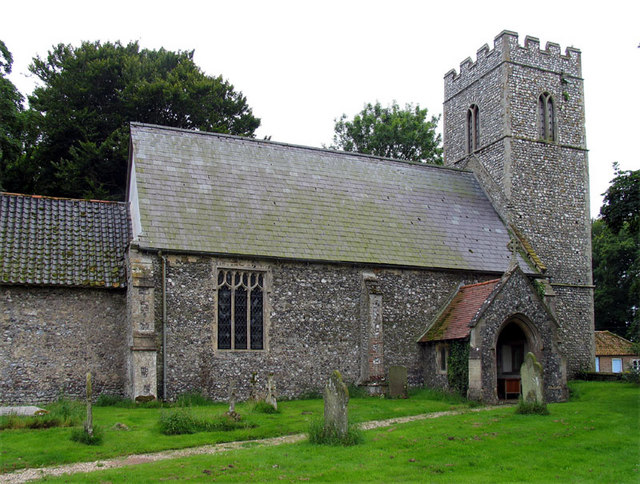
- St Andrew's Church

- Location within Norfolk
- Civil parish: Sustead
- District: North Norfolk
- Shire county: Norfolk
- Region: East
- Country: England
- Sovereign state: United Kingdom
- Post town: NORWICH
- Postcode district: NR11
- Dialling code: 01263
- Police: Norfolk
- Fire: Norfolk
- Ambulance: East of England
- UK Parliament: North Norfolk

Metton is a small village and former civil parish, now in the parish of Sustead, in the North Norfolk district, in the county of Norfolk, England. The village is 2.1 km west of Roughton, 5.2 km south of Cromer, 29.3 km north of Norwich and 11.2 km northwest of North Walsham. In 1931 the parish had a population of 86. On 1 April 1935 the parish was abolished and merged with Sustead.

The village’s name origin is uncertain. 'Meadow farm/settlement' or 'mowing farm/settlement', perhaps indicating a place where grass or another crop was mown, are possibilities.

It has a church dedicated to St Andrew and is part of the Diocese of Norwich.

April Fabb, a missing schoolgirl, lived in the village and disappeared on a journey from here to Roughton in 1969. She has not been found.
