= Crime of opportunity =

Crime committed without planning

A crime of opportunity is a crime that is committed without planning when the perpetrator sees that they have the chance to commit the act at that moment and seizes it. Such acts have little or no premeditation.

== Routine activity theory ==
This theory focuses on the right circumstances for a crime of opportunity to occur. The three main components of this theory emphasize an offender, suitable target and the lack of a capable guardian.

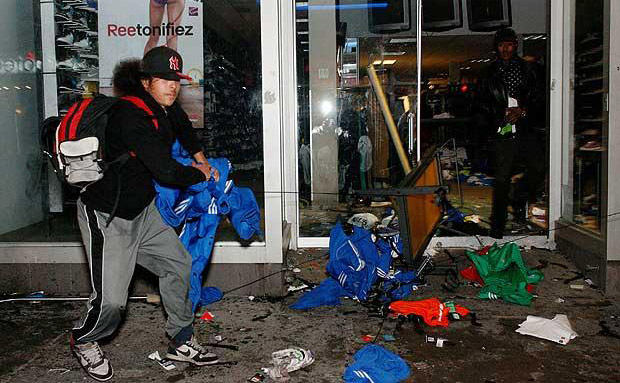
Looting of a store.

There are four main points that influence the likelihood of someone being targeted.

- Value
- Inertia
- Visibility
- Access

Value refers to how much a particular target is worth to the offender and it differs based on the person. Inertia simply refers to the size and weight of the target, which is why smaller goods are usually stolen versus bigger items. Visibility refers to the target being exposed to the offender, and thus making the target of value known to the offender. Access refers to how easily offenders can get to a target and what obstacles might impede them.

== Crime Pattern theory ==
This theory emphasizes the environment that these crimes occur in. There are three major components of this theory.

- Nodes
- Paths
- Edges

Nodes refers to the places people travel to and from and the crime generated in specific areas, for example bars, malls, parks, where people work, and the neighborhoods in which people live. Paths refers to the paths between nodes or areas that victims and offenders frequent, crime is frequently linked to flows of people among paths such as commuter times, establishment's closing times, and school being out for the day. Edges are the outer boundaries of certain areas, where outsiders of a neighborhood usually commit crimes.

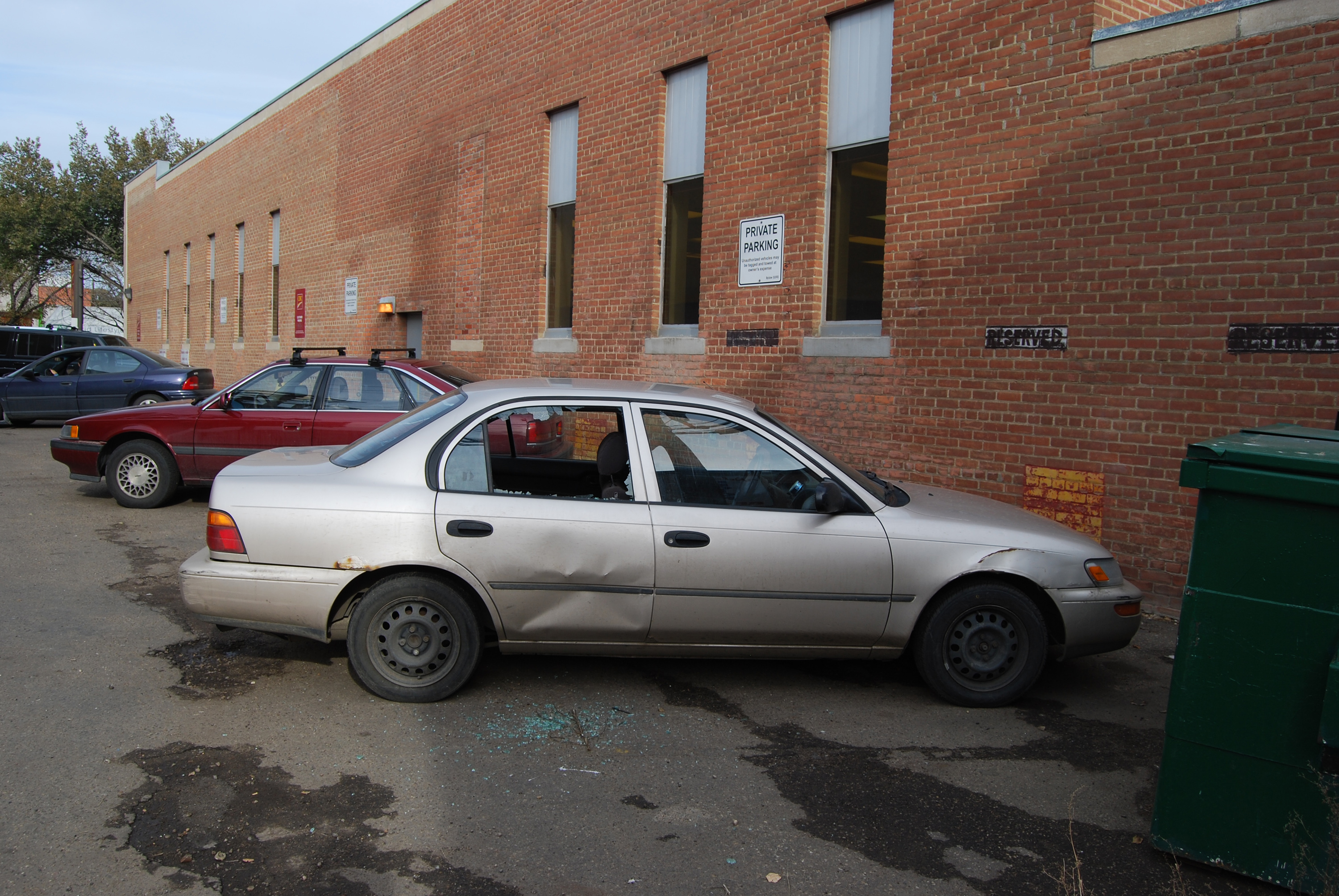
A vehicle with a broken window.

== Rational Choice perspective ==
This theory focuses on the offender's ability to make choices, based on the assumption that the offenders actions are purposeful. Offenders consider the benefits and risks and make choices based on the opportunities to commit a crime.

== Violent Crimes ==
Some violent crimes can also be considered a crime of opportunity. Variables such as whether or not female or middle-aged people are present can affect an individual's response to a perceived insult. Other variables like group size and size of the individual affect whether or not an offender may initiate a violent act. Larger groups will have the tendency to attack smaller groups and larger individuals will be more likely to attack smaller ones.

Reducing opportunities and prevention:

In order to reduce these types of crimes minimizing opportunities is the most common idea. Several methods are used to reduce opportunity:

- problem-oriented policing
- defensible space architecture
- situational crime prevention

All of these methods are used to reduce opportunities for specific targets.
