= Roughton, Norfolk =

Village and civil parish in Norfolk, England

Coordinates: 52.8824°N 01.29803°E

Roughton
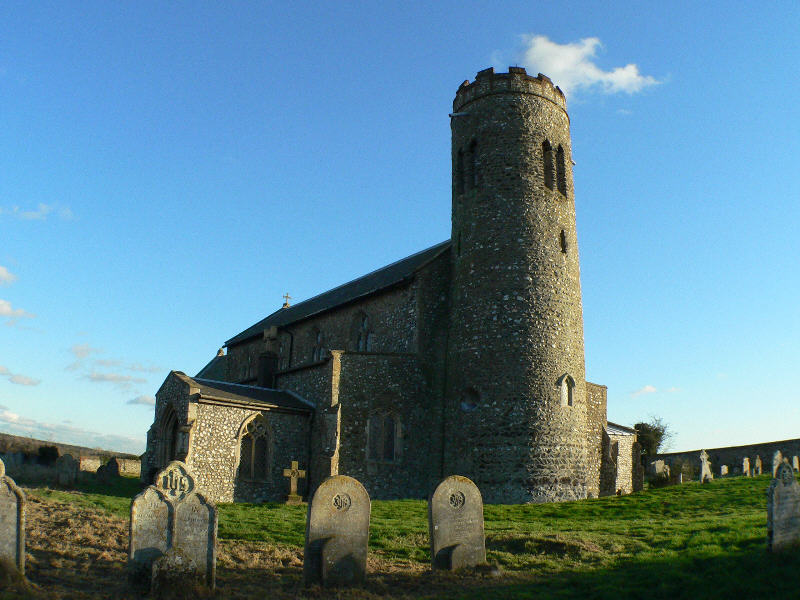
- St Mary's church

- Location within Norfolk
- Area: 7.23 km^{2} (2.79 sq mi)
- Population: 934 (parish, 2011 census)
  - Density: 129/km^{2} (330/sq mi)
- OS grid reference: TG220320
  - London: 134 miles (216 km)
- Civil parish: Roughton
- District: North Norfolk
- Shire county: Norfolk
- Region: East
- Country: England
- Sovereign state: United Kingdom
- Post town: NORWICH
- Postcode district: NR11
- Dialling code: 01263
- Police: Norfolk
- Fire: Norfolk
- Ambulance: East of England
- UK Parliament: North Norfolk

Roughton (ROW-ton) is a village and a civil parish in the English county of Norfolk. The village is located 3 3/4 miles (6 kilometres) south of Cromer, 19 1/2 miles (31.5 kilometres) north of Norwich and 6 1/2 miles (10.5 kilometres) northwest of North Walsham. The village's name means 'Rough farm/settlement', referring to the character of the ground.

== Amenities ==
Facilities in the village include a primary school, public house, village hall, fish and chip shop, play area, garage, windmill and fishing lake.

St Mary's Church is one of 124 existing round-tower churches in Norfolk. The tower is believed to be of Saxon origin and much of the main body of the building is Victorian.

== The Einstein connection ==
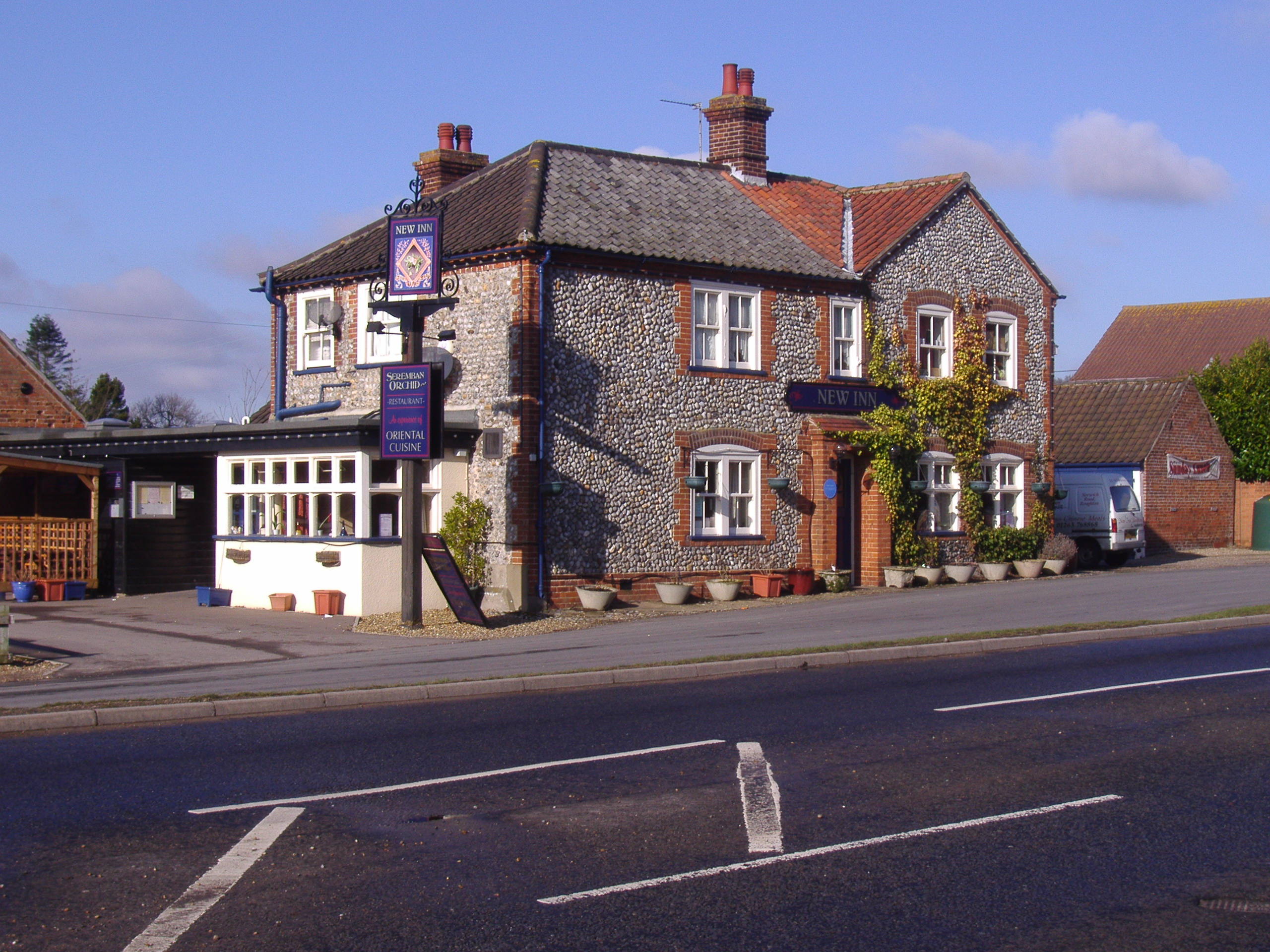
The New Inn public house, Roughton

In September 1933, Albert Einstein was brought to live in a small hut on Roughton Heath after fleeing Nazi Germany. Commander Oliver Locker-Lampson MP offered Einstein a refuge in Norfolk before he travelled to the United States. While here, he was sculpted by Jacob Epstein. A blue plaque commemorating Einstein's stay can be found at the entrance of the New Inn public house in the village. On 7 October 1933, he set sail from Southampton for a new life in the United States and never returned to Europe.

Einstein's visit inspired Mark Burgess’s radio play Einstein in Cromer. The story behind Einstein's visit to Roughton has been told in a book - Saving Einstein. When Norfolk Hid a Genius. The Double Life of Oliver Locker-Lampson. A Netflix docudrama Einstein and the Bomb described Einstein's visit using Einstein’s own words.

== Disappearance of April Fabb ==
The schoolgirl April Fabb was cycling from Metton nearby to visit her sister in Roughton when she disappeared without trace on 8 April 1969.

== Transport ==
The nearest railway station is at Roughton Road, which is a stop on the Bittern Line between Sheringham, Cromer and Norwich. Greater Anglia operates generally hourly services in both directions.

Sanders Coaches provides regular bus services to Norwich, Sheringham, Cromer and Holt.

The village straddles the A140, which links Cromer and Norwich, and the B1463.

The nearest airport is Norwich International Airport.
