= Aylesbeare Common =

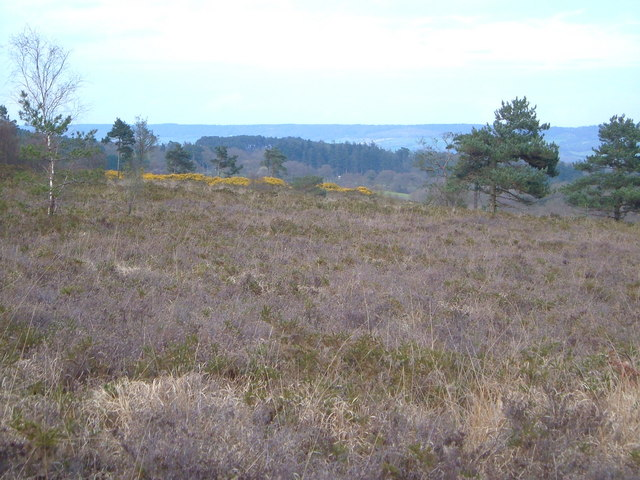
- Aylesbeare Common
- Interactive map of Aylesbeare Common
- Type: Nature reserve
- Location: Devon, England
- Coordinates: 50°42′N 3°20′W
- Operator: RSPB

Aylesbeare Common is a protected area in Devon, England. It is composed largely of heathland and woodland, interspersed with a few streams and ponds. There are several species of birds and insects which live in Aylesbeare Common, including a wider variety of butterfly species than in any other RSPB reserve.
