= Ray Wyre =

English criminologist (1951–2008)

- Born: Hampshire
- Occupation: Criminologist
- Known for: Pioneer in the treatment of sex offenders

Ray Wyre (2 November 1951 – 20 June 2008) was a pioneer in the treatment of sex offenders.

Born in Hampshire, his work as a probation officer in prisons brought him into contact with some of Britain's most dangerous violent and sexual offenders, including Reggie Kray and Robert Black. He set up the first residential treatment centre for sex offenders, the Gracewell Clinic, in 1988 in Birmingham.

A second edition of Wyre's 1995 book about Robert Black was posthumously published in 2018. Wyre's co-author on the first edition, Tim Tate, worked with Wyre's widow, Charmaine Richardson, to update the book.

Wyre had three children, all from his first marriage, which ended in divorce. He died of a stroke.

== Bibliography ==
- Women, Men & Rape, with Anthony Swift, Hodder & Stoughton, 1990. ISBN 978-0340529249
- Murder Squad, with Tim Tate, Methuen, 1992. ISBN 978-0-7493-0626-7
- The Murder Of Childhood: Inside The Mind Of One Of Britain's Most Notorious Child Murderers, with Tim Tate, Penguin, 1995. ISBN 978-0-14-024715-2
- The Murder Of Childhood: Inside The Mind Of One Of Britain’s Most Notorious Child Murderers (2nd edition), with Tim Tate and Charmaine Richardson, Waterside Press, 2018. ISBN 978-1909976627
