= John K. Emmerson =

American diplomat

John K. Emmerson Monument.

John Kenneth Emmerson (March 17, 1908 – March 24, 1984) was an American diplomat, and specialist on Japan and Northeast Asia.

== Early life ==
Emmerson was a native of Cañon City, Colorado. He earned degrees from the Sorbonne, Colorado College and New York University. He served in Taiwan and Japan before World War II. Before the war, he served under Ambassador Joseph Grew in Tokyo.

== World War II ==
In October 1944, Emmerson was sent to Yenan in China to interrogate Japanese prisoners of war captured by Chinese communists. In Yanan, Emmerson met Sanzo Nosaka (who was using the alias Susumu Okano at the time), leader of the Japanese Communist Party.

Assigned to Peru, Emmerson argued that Japanese individuals in Peru were unassimilated and “emotionally tied to their homeland” and represented a clear “problem of hemisphere defense.” His view became the foundation of State Department and U.S. policy on the Japanese in Peru and led to the United States pushing for the deportation and incarceration of Japanese Peruvians.

== Post-war ==
After the war, Emmerson returned to Japan as an adviser to Gen. Douglas MacArthur. He was attached to the Political Adviser's Office (POLAD). On October 5, 1945, Emmerson, along with E. Herbert Norman, drove to Fuchu Prison and met prominent Communists incarcerated there, including Tokuda Kyuichi, Shiga Yoshio, and Kim Chon-hae. Emmerson later served as deputy chief of mission in Tokyo under Ambassador Edwin O. Reischauer. Emmerson returned to Washington in February 1946.

John K. Emmerson foresaw that his presence in Yenan and his association with Sanzo Nosaka (AKA Susumu Okano) might engender suspicions that he was pro-Communist. During the Cold War, McCarthyites would accuse him of sponsoring Japanese Communist leaders, advocating policies that led to the "loss" of Asia, and of being a Communist or a "fellow traveler."

Emmerson was given the State Department's meritorious service award in 1954 and the personal rank of Minister in 1959. However, he also faced questions of his loyalty throughout the McCarthy period. He was required to stand before the Loyalty Security Board in 1952, and the Senate congressional committee in 1957, where he was questioned about his relationship with the leftist Canadian diplomat and scholar E. Herbert Norman, who committed suicide in the face of the questioning. Probably because of these investigations, he was not allowed to be posted to East Asia from 1952 to 1962, when he returned to Japan as deputy chief of mission under Ambassador Edwin O. Reischauer, where he served until his retirement in 1966.

He became diplomat in residence at Stanford University. He retired in 1968. Emmerson died in 1984 at Stanford University Hospital after a stroke. He was 76 years old. He was survived by his wife, Dorothy McLaughlin; a daughter, actress and singer Dorothy Louise Emmerson; a son, Stanford professor and Southeast Asia specialist Donald Kenneth Emmerson; a sister, Theodora E. Sinden, and two grandchildren.

== Works ==
- John K Emmerson (1978). The Japanese Thread: A life in the U.S. Foreign Service. Holt, Rinehart and Winston. ISBN 978-0-03-041646-0.
- John K Emmerson (1987). The eagle and the rising sun: America and Japan in the twentieth century. Stanford Alumni Association. ISBN 978-0-916318-30-7.
- John K Emmerson (1973). Will Japan Rearm?: A Study in Attitudes. American Enterprise Institute for Public Policy Research.
- John K Emmerson (1973). Arms, Yen & Power. Charles E. Tuttle Co.
