= Political prisoners in Imperial Japan =

Political prisoners in Fuchu Prison: Kyuichi Tokuda (second from left), Yoshio Shiga (third from left)

Political prisoners in Imperial Japan were detained and prosecuted by the government of the Empire of Japan for dissent, attempting to change the national character of Japan, Communist activity, or association with a group whose stated aims included the aforementioned goals. Following the dissolution of the Empire of Japan after World War II, all remaining political prisoners were released by policies issued under the Allied occupation of Japan.

== Meiji period – Shōwa period ==
Imprisoned leaders of the Japan Communist Party are greeted upon their release from Fuchu Prison. (ca. 10 October 1945)

Beginning in the Meiji period, the government of the Empire of Japan detained Japanese residents suspected of political dissidence.

In 1925, the Peace Preservation Law was passed. Article 1 of the law stipulates that:

"Anyone who organises an association with the objective of change the kokutai or denying the private property system, or who joins such an association with full knowledge of its objectives, shall be liable to imprisonment with or without hard labour for a term not exceeding ten years."

Only about 5,000 out of more than 74,000 suspected violators of the Peace Preservation Law between 1928 and 1941 were prosecuted.

Those who recanted were either released or received short prison terms.

The Peace Preservation Law was also applied in cultural and artistic contexts. A case in the wartime repression of Japanese Surrealism was the detention of the painter Ichiro Fukuzawa and the art critic Shūzō Takiguchi on 5 April 1941 for about seven months on suspicion of violating the law.

On 4 October 1945, the GHQ issued the Removal of Restrictions on Political, Civil, and Religious Liberties directive, which stipulated the release of political prisoners. It was estimated that 2,500 to 3,000 political prisoners were in prison by the end of the war. Following the release of political prisoners on 10 October 1945, the GHQ enacted the "Restoration of Electoral Rights to Released Political Prisoners."

== Notable political prisoners ==
- Kyuichi Tokuda
- Yoshio Shiga (communist)
- Shigeo Kamiyama
- Shoichi Ichikawa
- Kiyoshi Miki
- Jun Tosaka

== Notable prisons ==
- Sugamo Prison
- Fuchu Prison

== Memoirs ==
- Eighteen Years in Prison (Gokuchu juhachi-nen) by Kyuichi Tokuda and Yoshio Shiga. Published by the Japanese Communist Party in 1948.

== See also ==
- Political dissidence in the Empire of Japan
- Political repression in Imperial Japan
