= Guillan =

Guillan may refer to:

- Guillan, Burkina Faso, a village in Cassou Department, Ziro Province, Centre-Ouest, Burkina Faso
- Guillán River, a river in Cuenca Canton, Azuay Province, Ecuador

== Grapes ==
- Gouais blanc, a white French grape variety also known as Guillan
- Malbec, a red wine grape variety also known as Guillan
- Muscadelle, another white French wine grape that is also known as Guillan

== See also ==
- Gilan (disambiguation)
- Gillan (disambiguation)
- Gilliam (disambiguation)
- Guillain (disambiguation)
