= Fuchū Prison =

Prison in Fuchū, Tokyo, Japan

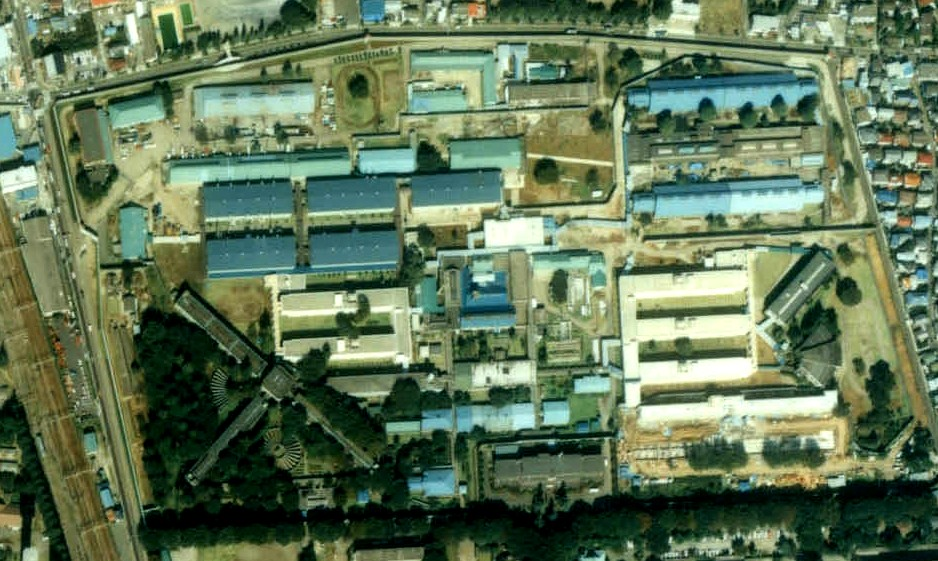
- Aerial photograph of Fuchū Prison
- Interactive map of Fuchū Prison
- Location: Fuchū, Tokyo, Japan; 35°41′3.6″N 139°28′26.3″E
- Status: Operational
- Capacity: 2842
- Population: 2086 (December 2015)
- Opened: 1935
- Managed by: Ministry of Justice (Japan)
- Website: https://www.moj.go.jp/kyousei1/kyousei_kyouse16-03.html

Fuchū Prison (府中刑務所, Fuchū keimusho) is a prison in Japan. It is located in the city of Fuchū, Tokyo to the west of the center of Tokyo Metropolis. Before the end of World War II, Fuchū prison held Communist leaders, members of banned religious sects, and leaders of the Korean independence movement.

== History ==
Fuchū Prison was opened in June 1935 after the need for a new and larger prison was determined by the Home Ministry in a review following the 1923 Great Kantō earthquake, during which Tokyo's main prison, Sugamo Prison, was destroyed. During the pre-war period, the prison also housed many political prisoners as well as common criminals.

After the war, the prison was visited by Harold Isaacs of Newsweek, French correspondent Robert Guillain, John K. Emmerson, E. Herbert Norman and Domei reporter Tay Tateishi.

The 1968 "300 million yen robbery" took place outside of the walls of the prison.

The prison facilities were renovated over a ten-year period from 1986 to 1995.

As of December 2015, Fuchū Prison was the largest prison in Japan, housing 2086 prisoners. The prison covers an area of 22.6 ha (56 acres), and is surrounded by a 1.8 km (1.1 mi) wall with a height of 5.5 m (18 ft), The cells are divided into four blocks (ordinary prisoners, foreign prisoners, mentally ill prisoners, and physically disabled or injured prisoners). Male foreign prisoners in Japan are generally housed at Fuchū Prison. The prison also contains numerous workshops for vocational training. Foreigners are incarcerated for various crimes but all in single cells in two or three blocks.

== Notable inmates ==
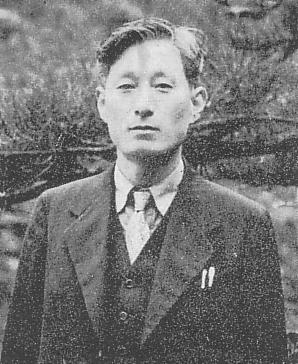
Kim Chon-hae

- George Abe - Japanese author and former yakuza
- Richard Hinds - American murderer
- Kim Chon-hae
- Yoshio Shiga
- Kenichi Shinoda - Japanese yakuza
- Yoshie Shiratori - Prison escapee who escaped four prisons, this prison being his final (and the first in which he served his full prison sentence before parole).
- Masashi Tashiro
- Kyuichi Tokuda

== See also ==
- Political prisoners in Imperial Japan
