= Gillen =

Gillen may refer to:

- Gillen (surname), including a list of people with the name
- Gillen D'Arcy Wood, Australian scholar and author
- Gillen, Skye, a village in Scotland
- Gillen, Northern Territory, a suburb of Alice Springs, Australia

== See also ==
- Gillan (disambiguation)
