= Appeal to the People =

Appeal to the People or An Appeal to the People was a document written by communists in Shōwa era Imperial Japan in Fuchu Prison. It was issued after their release on October 10, 1945, a month after the Surrender of Japan on September 2, 1945.

In the first issue of the Shimbun Akahata newspaper published after World War II, Kyuichi Tokuda, Yoshio Shiga, and other released Communists issued an "Appeal to the People" on October 10, 1945. In it the following themes were advanced:

1. Gratitude for the opening of the "democratic revolution" in Japan as a result of the Allied Occupation, and "enthusiastic support" for the peace policy of the United States, the United Kingdom, and the other Allied Powers.

2. A pledge to overthrow the Emperor system described as a combination of the Emperor and his court, the military and the administrative bureaucrats, the nobility, the absentee landlords, and the monopoly capitalists and to establish a People's Democracy.

3. Promises to eliminate militarism and police politics, to confiscate "parasitic" and idle land, distributing it to the peasants, to establish free labor unions, to abolish the old security laws, to remove the military and bureaucratic cliques from power, and to set up a national assembly based on universal suffrage for all Japanese over eighteen years of age.

4. An attack on "phony liberals" and "pseudo-socialists" who had supported the Emperor system, declaring them unfit for leadership.

5. A call for the creation of a united front under Japanese Communist Party leadership of all those who shared the above objectives.

According to John W. Dower "Later, when the Cold War intensified, this would become a point of embarrassment to the Communists, who lamely rationalized Tokuda's words by pointing out that the reference to "Allies" included the Soviet Union.
