= Gillan =

Gillan may refer to:

== Places ==
- Gillan, Cornwall, England
- Gillan, the former Turkish name for Gjilan (Serbian: Gnjilane)

== People ==
- Gillan (1809 cricketer), English cricketer
- Audrey Gillan, journalist
- Cheryl Gillan (1952–2021), Welsh politician
- Chester Gillan (born 1943), Canadian politician
- Felix Gillan (1903–1986), Scottish footballer
- Ian Gillan (born 1945), English musician
- James Angus Gillan (1885–1981), Scottish rower and colonial service official
- James Gillan (actor) (born 1975), British actor
- Jamie Gillan (born 1997), American football player
- Jeff Gillan (born 1957), American journalist
- Karen Gillan (born 1987), Scottish actress
- Kim Gillan (born 1951), Montana politician
- Robert Gillan (died 1879), minister of the Church of Scotland

== Other ==
- Gillan (band), A rock band headed by Deep Purple frontman Ian Gillan in the late seventies and early eighties, selling ten million albums in Europe
  - Gillan (album), their debut album

== See also ==
- Gillen (disambiguation)
