= Guillain =

Guillain may refer to:

== People ==
- Georges Guillain (1876–1961), French neurologist
- Gilles Guillain (born 1982), Colombian-born French actor
- Robert Guillain (1908–1998), French journalist and author of several books on Japan

== Medical ==
- Guillain–Barré syndrome, an acute polyneuropathy, a disorder affecting the peripheral nervous system
- Triangle of Guillain-Mollaret, the myoclonic triangle, an important feedback circuit of the brainstem

== See also ==
- Guillan (disambiguation)
