= Eighteen Years in Prison =

Book by Kyuichi Tokuda and Yoshio Shiga

- Author: Kyuichi Tokuda and Yoshio Shiga
- Language: Japanese
- Genre: Non-fiction
- Publisher: Jiji Press
- Publication date: 1947
- Publication place: Japan
- Pages: 161

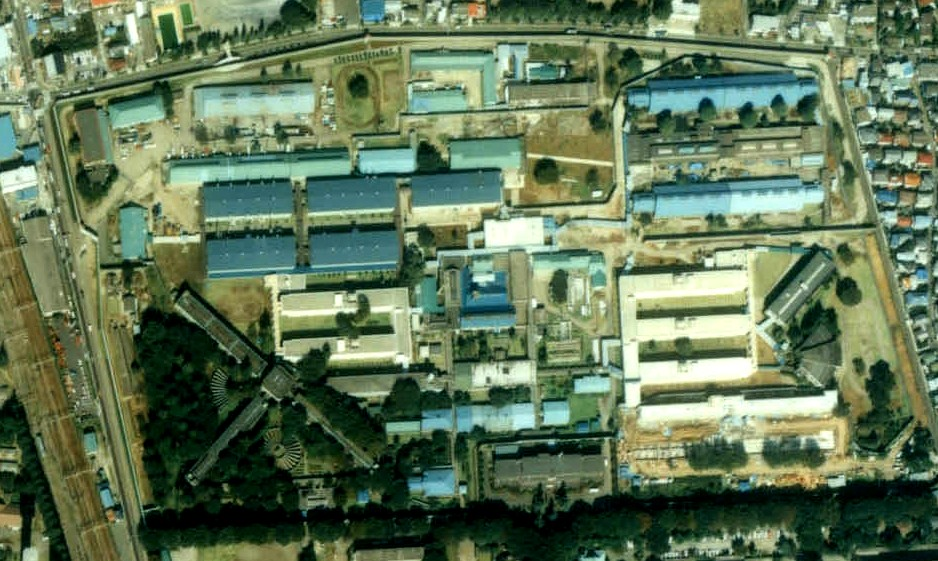
Fuchu Prison

Eighteen Years in Prison (獄中十八年, Gokuchu juhachi-nen) is a Japanese autobiographical book by Kyuichi Tokuda and Yoshio Shiga.

== Background ==
Eighteen Years in Prison describes the life of Tokuda Kyuichi and Yoshio Shiga, both of whom were communists imprisoned in Imperial Japan. The events in the book include their liberation from Fuchu Prison following the defeat of the Empire of Japan in World War II. The book was published by the Japanese Communist Party in 1948. The book was translated by Andrew Y. Kuroda of the Japanese Section, Orientalist Division, the Library of Congress. In 1951, the book was a subject during the "Hearings before the Subcommittee to Investigate the Administration of the Internal Security Act and Other Internal Security Laws of the Committee on the Judiciary". Eighteen Years in Prison has been cited as a reference for the books The Japanese Communist Party 1922-1945 by George M. Beckmann, Genji Okubo and Janus-Faced Justice: Political Criminals in Imperial Japan by Richard H. Mitchell.

== Bibliography ==
- Tokuda Kyuichi, Shiga Yoshio (1947). 獄中十八年 (Eighteen Years in Prison). 時事通信社 (Jiji Press).
