= Murder of Nicola Furlong =

Young Irish woman who was drugged and murdered in Japan in 2012

Nicola Furlong
- Nicola Furlong
- Born: 17 December 1990; County Wexford, Ireland
- Died: 24 May 2012 (aged 21); Shinjuku, Tokyo, Japan
- Cause of death: Homicide
- Resting place: Curracloe, Co Wexford
- Education: Dublin City University
- Occupations: Student (Business and Languages)
- Known for: Murder victim

Nicola Furlong was an Irish exchange student who was murdered in a Shinjuku hotel while studying at a Takasaki university near Tokyo in 2012. American citizen Richard Hinds, currently known as Rich Hinds, was later convicted of her murder and sentenced to a minimum of 5 years in prison. A memorial, located in Ardcavan, County Wexford, was erected in her memory in 2018.

== Background ==
Nicola Furlong was a student of Business and Japanese at Dublin City University when in 2011 she moved to Japan as part of an exchange program with the Takasaki City University of Economics, and was due to move back to Ireland in July 2012. On 23 May 2012, Furlong and another Irish exchange student travelled to Tokyo by train to attended a concert by Nicki Minaj in Odaiba district. The pair remained in Tokyo afterwards, planning to stay up all night clubbing and then catch the first train home the next morning. They met two African American men (19-year-old Richard Hinds and 23-year-old dancer James Jamari Blackston) at Tokyo Teleport Station after the concert, who offered to take them drinking in the Shibuya district. The men also offered Furlong and her friend one of their rooms in the Keio Plaza Hotel in Shinjuku if they wished to stay over, however the women declined.

== Death ==
The group arrived at the Scramble bar in Shibuya, where Furlong and her friend bought the men a round of drinks out of gratitude. Hinds and Blackston then bought shots of tequila for the two women and, after drinking her shot, Furlong's friend suddenly blacked out and did not regain her senses fully for several hours afterwards. At 12:50 am, Hinds and Blackston hailed a taxi and placed the two now heavily intoxicated women in the back, then instructed the driver to take them to the Keio Plaza Hotel. A surveillance camera in the roof of the vehicle, which the two men were unaware of, recorded Blackston sexually assaulting Furlong's unconscious friend while both men were laughing and discussing having sex with the pair. Hinds was recorded saying: "We can fuck them", with Blackston recorded replying: "We are going to fuck them and leave them in my room."

When the taxi arrived at the hotel Furlong and her friend were too intoxicated to walk, and hotel staff had to provide wheelchairs to get them out of the taxi. Hinds and Blackston then took the pair to separate rooms on the upper floors. At around 3:20 am, the hotel duty manager went to Hinds's room to investigate a complaint of loud noise, and on entering the room he saw Furlong lying on the floor. Noticing her lips had turned white and she did not appear to be breathing, he attempted emergency resuscitation. An ambulance was then called to transport Furlong and her friend to a nearby medical facility, and shortly after 3:55 am Furlong was pronounced dead in the emergency room of Tokyo Medical University hospital. On 24 May 2012, Nicki Minaj posted on her Twitter feed to express sadness over the murder of Furlong and to offer "love & prayers" to her family back in Ireland.

Hinds and Blackston were arrested at the scene and brought to a Shinjuku police station for interrogation. Hinds and Blackston were initially held for questioning on suspicion of sexually assaulting Furlong's unconscious friend on the back seat of the taxi, with both men being charged with quasi-forcible indecency on 29 May 2012.On 15 June 2012 the Tokyo Metropolitan Police Department re-arrested Hinds for the murder of Nicola Furlong after reviewing her autopsy report. In July 2012, Japanese authorities announced that they were also investigating Blackston regarding a separate sexual assault allegedly carried out by him on another young woman in Kofu a few months previously.

== Trial ==
On 4 March 2013 at the Tokyo District Court, Richard Hinds pleaded not guilty to the murder of Nicola Furlong, before a court composed of three professional judges and six civilian lay judges. Although Hinds was eligible for the death penalty if found guilty, in practice capital punishment in Japan is reserved for crimes that result in multiple murder victims.

In their opening statements, the prosecution accused Hinds of strangling Furlong to death with a towel after getting her drunk and possibly drugging her with an intent to commit rape, whereas defence lawyers suggested she actually died of a self induced overdose of alcohol and drugs. While Hinds had admitted to lightly pressing on her neck while they had what he claimed was consensual sex, he denied intentionally killing her.

=== Prosecution submissions ===
Testifying for the prosecution, Dr Kenichi Yoshida, who performed the post mortem examination on Furlong, asserted that she had died of strangulation, and rejected suggestions by defence lawyers that alcohol played any role in her death. Dr Yoshida added that Furlong died a slow and painful death over several minutes, and scratch marks made by the victim herself as she fought back indicated she was in great distress as she was murdered. Evidence indicated that a towel was used to strangle Furlong, not someone's bare hands.

Dr Kenta Aida, who had treated Furlong in the hospital emergency room, also gave evidence of administering injections of adrenaline in an attempt to revive her, as well as performing cardiopulmonary resuscitation and inserting a plastic tube into her throat to keep her airway open. These were the reasons for puncture wounds being found on Furlong's body and traces of lidocaine (used to lubricate the breathing tube) being found in her blood, and were not indications of recreational drug use.

Furlong's friend gave evidence via audio link, and described how the two women strongly declined Hinds's offer to come back to the hotel on the night in question, as they both had long term boyfriends back in Ireland. Frequently breaking down into tears, she also testified that after drinking a shot of tequila the two men had bought for her she had a total memory blackout until she woke up in hospital the next morning, something that had never happened to her before in her life from drinking alcohol, which lead her to believe her drink was spiked with a date rape drug.

=== Defence submissions ===
Giving evidence in his own defence, Hinds claimed he was only concerned for the welfare of Furlong and her friend and had no other intention but to bring them back to the hotel to get some rest. When the prosecutor countered that the men were recorded in the taxi saying "These bitches fell into our lap" and exchanging fist bumps, Hinds described their behaviour as harmless banter commonly used amongst young men from the African American culture. Continuing his cross examination, the prosecutor asked Hinds to explain when he meant when he was recorded saying "I can't wait to get ATM". Hinds insisted he was merely telling Blackston he would get cash from the automated teller machine to pay him back for drinks, however the prosecution asserted that he was actually referring to the pornography slang term 'ass to mouth', which was a clear indication of his intent to rape Miss Furlong.

Hinds testified that he put his hands around Furlong's neck after she refused his sexual advances, and that he had no intention to kill her. However, his version of events was rejected by the prosecution, who claimed that Hinds tried to rape Furlong while she was unconscious, only for her to wake up and scream. Hinds then strangled her. According to police, Furlong's friend was sexually assaulted in the taxi on the way to the hotel while both women were unconscious. Once they arrived at the men's hotel, the hotel provided a wheelchair to take the incapacitated women to the men's rooms. Police said the groping that took place in the taxi was captured on a security camera, as was the entrance of the two women to the hotel in wheelchairs being pushed by the two men.

=== Closing statements ===
Victim impact statements from members of the Furlong family were read to the court. Furlong's mother stated she was "repulsed" by the defence team's efforts to slander the good name of her daughter and Hinds's callous lack of remorse for her murder, while Furlong's sister spoke of the anguish their father felt when his daughter was falsely described as an alcoholic drug user who had dressed inappropriately to attract attention. The statements were so harrowing that several of the judges began to cry as they were read out.

Lead prosecutor Kenji Horikoshi demanded a five-to-10-year jail sentence as punishment for Hinds, declaring that he had shown no remorse and had "violated Nicola's dignity" with his false portrayal of her as a sexually aggressive woman. Defence lawyer Kenji Hattori countered that there was not enough evidence to convict Hinds of murder, and that testimony given by Dr Kenichi Yoshida was prejudiced in favour of the prosecution.

When offered the opportunity to address the court, Hinds instead spoke directly to Furlong's parents in an effort to downplay the result of his actions. After objections by prosecutors, Hinds then addressed the judges and claimed to firmly believe he was not ultimately responsible for Furlong's death.

== Verdict and sentencing ==
On 19 March 2013, Hinds was found guilty and sentenced to five-to-ten years prison with labour for the murder of Nicola Furlong. Presiding Judge Masaharu Ashizawa disregarded Hinds's testimony of an accidental death in its entirety, countering that the fact it took Furlong several minutes to die from strangulation was a clear indication of murderous intent. The judge also noted that Hinds had shown absolutely no remorse for the murder of Furlong and instead had "consistently dishonoured" her in an effort to escape conviction. Judge Ashizawa stated that the court was satisfied that Hinds took an incapacitated Furlong to his room with an intent to commit rape, and when she suddenly regained consciousness and fought back Hinds then strangled her using either a hotel towel or his own tank top.

In a separate trial, James Blackston was found guilty of the sexual assault of Furlong's friend and another Brazilian woman, and was sentenced to three years in prison with labour. Judge Masayuki Yamada remarked that there was no evidence of consent and that Blackston had taken advantage of a victim who was not able to resist. Both women described blacking out after drinking a tequila shot provided to them by Blackston.

== Incarceration and release of Hinds ==
Hinds was detained in Fuchū Prison, the standard procedure for the majority of male foreign prisoners in the penal system of Japan. As well as being forced to obey strict military-like discipline, inmates are also forced to take part in penal labour according to prison regulations, where they earn approximately €40 per month working in factories. Whilst incarcerated in Fuchū Prison, Hinds was classed as a “category-three prisoner” by the authorities, which meant they believed he had only a moderate expectation of rehabilitation. Hinds's release was originally projected for November 2017, but parole was denied after prison officials deemed that he had "failed to convince authorities that he was remorseful for Nicola's murder." Hinds was released from prison on 19 November 2022 and then deported to the United States on a commercial flight.

== Post-trial developments ==
Shortly after returning to Ireland, the Furlong family announced they would launch a civil action against the Keio Plaza Hotel and sue for negligence, alleging they broke Japanese law by not checking if Nicola was on the guest register and allowing Hinds to bring her up to his room in a wheelchair while unconscious.

In late 2015, James Blackston appeared as a backing dancer in the video for the Chris Brown single "Wrist", and in early 2016 Blackston posted on Instagram to thank all those who supported him when he was incarcerated in Japan, while simultaneously dismissing the case as "an unfortunate imbroglio all around".

In 2023, Hinds posted pictures on his Facebook account of him performing on tour with Sean2 Miles at the Wiltern Theater in Los Angeles and playing piano at the Faith Covenant Church in his hometown of Memphis, Tennessee. Hinds had earlier confirmed in a radio interview with WKRA-FM that he planned to go on tour as a pianist.
