= Censorship in the Empire of Japan =

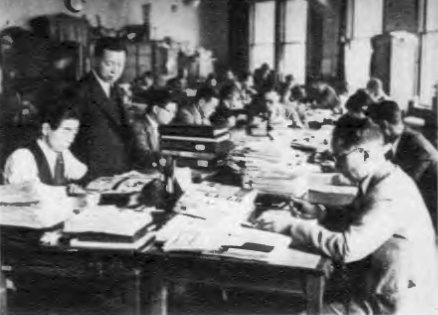
Government censors at work at the Tokyo Metropolitan Police Department in 1938

Censorship (検閲, Ken'etsu) in the Empire of Japan was a continuation of a long tradition beginning in the feudal period of Japan. Government censorship of the press existed in Japan during the Edo period, as the Tokugawa bakufu was in many ways a police state, which sought to control the spread of information, including Christianity, the influx of Western ideas, pornography and any political writings critical of the shōgun and government.

== Meiji Period (1868–1912) ==
Episodes of newspaper suppression and imprisonment of editors occurred in 1868, 1876 and 1887. Freedom of speech and the press was heavily restricted through vaguely worded laws.

With the Meiji Restoration, the focus of state censorship of information shifted to protection of the Emperor and the fledgling Meiji government. Ideals of liberal democracy were considered dangerously subversive, and were targeted with the Publication Ordinance of 1869 (出版条例, Shuppan Jōrei), which banned certain subjects (including pornography), and subjected publications to pre-publication review and approvals. Initially intended to serve as a copyright law, it was quickly adopted as a method of controlling public anti-government criticism.

With the establishment of the cabinet system of government, the Home Ministry was assigned this task, and issued a variety of regulations aimed specifically at newspapers. The growth of the Freedom and People's Rights Movement caused a reaction by conservative elements within the government to pass strict libel laws in 1875, and also a draconian Press Ordinance of 1875 (新聞紙条例, Shimbunshi Jōrei) that was so severe that it was labeled the "newspaper abolition law" as it empowered the Home Minister to ban or shut down offending newspapers which the government deemed offensive to public order or state security. The ordinance was further strengthened in revisions of 1887, which extended penalties to authors as well as publishers, and also restricted the import of foreign language newspapers with objectionable material.

During the First Sino-Japanese War of 1894–1895, and the Russo-Japanese War of 1904–1905, the Army Ministry also imposed separate censorship restrictions in time of war.

The censorship laws were revised again in the Publication Law of 1893 (出版法, Shuppan Hō), which remained virtually unchanged until 1949. Newspaper regulations followed suit in the Press Law of 1909 (新聞紙条例, Shimbunshi Jorei), which followed the regulations of the 1893 Publication Law and detailed punishments for offenses.

== Taishō period (1912–1926) ==
Although the Taishō period is stereotyped as one of liberal politics, it was also a period of great social upheaval, and the government became increasingly heavy-handed in its attempts to control the spread of new political philosophies deemed dangerous to the government: especially communism and socialism. After the end of World War I, the Peace Preservation Law of 1925 increased police powers to prosecute promoters of communism and socialism. Censorship restrictions were also expanded to cover religious groups. In 1928, the death penalty was added for certain violations, and the Special Higher Police Force (Tokkō) was created to deal with ideological offenses (i.e. thought crimes) on a national basis.

== Early Shōwa Period (1926–1945) ==
In 1924, the Publications Monitoring Department of the Home Ministry was created with separate sections for censorship, investigation and general affairs. With the outbreak of the Second Sino-Japanese War, the Home Ministry, Army Ministry, Navy Ministry and Ministry of Foreign Affairs all held regular meetings with publishers to provide advice on how to follow the ever-stringent regulations. Penalties for violations increased in severity, and voice recordings (including radio broadcasts) also came under official purview.

In 1936, an Information and Propaganda Committee was created within the Home Ministry, which issued all official press statements, and which worked together with the Publications Monitoring Department on censorship issues. The activities of this committee, a consortium of military, politicians and professionals upgraded to a Cabinet Information Division (内閣情報部, Naikaku jōhōbu) in September 1937, were proscriptive as well as prescriptive. Besides applying censorship to all medias of the Shōwa regime and issuing detailed guidelines to publishers, it made suggestions that were all but commands. From 1938, print media "would come to realize that their survival depended upon taking cues from the Cabinet Information Bureau and its flagship publication, Shashin shūhō, designers of the 'look' of the soldier, and the 'look' of the war". This tightening also extended to the wartime repression of Japanese Surrealism, including the 1939 police ban of the Nagoya Surrealist journal Yoru no Funsui, launched the year before by Kansuke Yamamoto.

Article 12 of the censorship guideline for newspapers issued in September 1937 stated that any news article or photograph "unfavorable" to the Imperial Army was subject to a gag. Article 14 prohibited any "photographs of atrocities" but endorsed reports about the "cruelty of the Chinese" soldiers and civilians.

Giving the example of the Nanjing massacre, Tokushi Kasahara of Tsuru University asserts, "Some deniers argue that Nanjing was much more peaceful than we generally think. They always show some photographs with Nanjing refugees selling some food in the streets or Chinese people smiling in the camps. They are forgetting about Japanese propaganda. The Imperial Army imposed strict censorship. Any photographs with dead bodies couldn't get through. So photographers had to remove all the bodies before taking pictures of streets and buildings in the city ... Even if the photos were not staged, the refugees had no choice but to fawn on the Japanese soldiers. Acting otherwise meant their deaths ..."

One of the most famous examples of censorship is related to Mugi to heitai (Wheat and soldiers), Ashihei Hino's wartime bestseller. A paragraph in which the author described the beheading of three Chinese soldiers was cut from the final section of the book despite the author's dedication to the war effort.

In 1940, the Information Department (情報部, Jōhōbu) was elevated to the Information Bureau (情報局, Jōhōkyoku), which consolidated the previously separate information departments from the Army, Navy and Foreign Ministry under the aegis of the Home Ministry. The new Jōhōkyoku had complete control over all news, advertising and public events. It was headed by a president (sōsai) responsible directly to the Prime minister with a staff of about 600 people including military officers and officials from the Home and Foreign ministries. In February 1941 it distributed among editors a black list of writers whose articles they were advised not to print anymore.

The officials spokesmen of the Naikaku Johōkyoku, such as the vice-president Hideo Okumura, Major-General Nakao Nahagi and Captain Hideo Hiraide, became themselves the most popular commentators. These men addressed press conferences, spoke on the radio and wrote in newspapers.

The Naikaku Johōkyoku however dealt only with civilian matters. War bulletins were the domain of the Daihonei hōdōbu, the Press Department of the Imperial General Headquarters which was made up of the press sections of the Army and the Navy. The Daihonei hōdōbu deployed its own war correspondents and occasionally drafted civilian reporters for coverage.

The 1941 revision of the National Mobilization Law (国家総動員法, Kokka Sōdōin Hō) eliminated freedom of the press completely. All mail was also subject to scrutiny. In February 1942, all newspapers were ordered to merge, or to cease publication. The Japan Publishers League (日本新聞連盟 Nihon shinbun renmei), reorganized in the Japan Publishers Association (日本新聞会 Nihon shinbunkai) agreed to cooperate with the government by conducting internal monitoring of its members by a self-screening of drafts, manuscripts and proofs before final submission to the official government censors. As the war situation deteriorated, the government took over the distribution of paper, releasing supplies only for matter related to official policy. By 1944, only 34 magazines were left in publication, and by 1945, only one newspaper was permitted per prefecture.

On Taiwan, occupied by Japan since the First Sino-Japanese War in 1895, colonial authorities implemented de-Sinicization campaigns. In 1937, Japanese colonial authorities banned all dialects of Chinese and all aboriginal Taiwan languages. Authorities also banned newspapers written in Chinese.

On 8 February 1943, the Japanese occupiers in Shanghai created what they described as the designated area (the Shanghai ghetto) in Hongkew where they re-located and segregated the Jewish refugees in Shanghai from whom Nazi Germany had stripped citizenship. Among other abuses, Japanese authorities censored Jewish cultural activities there.

== Occupation of Japan ==
After the surrender of Japan in 1945, the Supreme Commander of the Allied Powers abolished all forms of censorship and controls on freedom of speech, which was also integrated into Article 21 of the 1947 Constitution of Japan. However, press censorship remained a reality in the post-war era, especially in matters of pornography, and in political matters deemed subversive by the American government during the occupation of Japan.

According to David M. Rosenfeld:

Not only did Occupation censorship forbid criticism of the United States or other Allied nations, but the mention of censorship itself was forbidden. This means, as Donald Keene observes, that for some producers of texts "the Occupation censorship was even more exasperating than Japanese military censorship had been because it insisted that all traces of censorship be concealed. This meant that articles had to be rewritten in full, rather than merely submitting XXs for the offending phrases."

— Donald Keene, quoted in Dawn to the West

== See also ==
- Political repression in Imperial Japan
- Censorship in Japan
- Dōmei Tsushin – the official news agency of the Empire of Japan
