= Gillen (surname) =

Gillen is a surname. Notable people with the surname include:

- Aidan Gillen (born 1968), actor
- Ann Gillen, artist
- Brian Gillen (born 1970), member of the Irish Republican Army
- Charles P. Gillen (1876–1956), mayor of Newark, New Jersey, US
- Dolores Gillen (1914/1915–1947), American actress
- Francis James Gillen (1855–1912), Australian anthropologist and ethnologist
- Gerard Gillen, professor of music
- Gwen Gillen (1941–2017), American artist
- Kieron Gillen (born 1975), journalist and comic book writer
- Laura Gillen (born 1969), New York politician
- Mary A. Gillen (1894–1963), New York politician
- Michael J. Gillen (1885–1942), New York politician
- Pete Gillen (born 1947), American college basketball coach and television commentator
- Peter Paul Gillen (1858–1896), storekeeper and politician in South Australia
- Ray Gillen (1959–1993), singer with various bands, among them Black Sabbath
- Shelley Gillen, Canadian producer and screenwriter
- Simon Gillen (1855–1918), Wisconsin, US politician and judge
- Cathy Gillen Thacker, American author of romance novels
