= Political repression in Imperial Japan =

Political repression in Imperial Japan lasted from the Meiji period to the fall of the Empire of Japan after the end of World War II. Throughout this period, dissidence was curtailed by laws, and police, and dissidents became political prisoners.

Several laws were passed to curtail dissidence in Imperial Japan, including the Public Peace Police Law in 1900, and the Peace Preservation Law in 1925.

The earliest secret police in Imperial Japan was the Danjodai, established in May 1869. The Tokubetsu Kōtō Keisatsu (Tokko) was established in 1911 following the Great Treason Incident of 1910.

By the late 1930s, political repression had also reached cultural fields, including Surrealist publishing and artists' associations. In 1939, the police banned the Nagoya Surrealist journal Yoru no Funsui, launched the previous year by Kansuke Yamamoto. The 10 March 1941 revision of the Peace Preservation Law further expanded the reach of ideological policing and made artistic associations and groups subject to police control. On 5 April 1941, the painter Ichiro Fukuzawa and the art critic Shūzō Takiguchi were detained on suspicion of violating the law; the 2024 catalogue treats the detentions as an early case in the wartime repression of Japanese Surrealism.

== See also ==
- Political prisoners in Imperial Japan
- Japanese dissidence during the Shōwa period
- Censorship in the Empire of Japan
- Tenkō
- Red Scare in Japan

== Works cited ==
- Tipton, Elise K. (1990). The Japanese Police State: The Tokkô in Interwar Japan. Honolulu: University of Hawaii Press. ISBN 978-0-8248-1328-4.
