= Bible John =

Unidentified serial killer in Glasgow, Scotland

- 1969 artist's impression of Bible John
- Height: 5 ft 10 in (1.78 m) to 6 ft 0 in (1.83 m)

Details
- Victims: 3
- Span of crimes: 22 February 1968 – 31 October 1969
- Locations: Glasgow, Scotland

Bible John is the moniker given to an unidentified serial killer who is believed to have murdered three young women in Glasgow, Scotland, between 1968 and 1969.

The victims of Bible John were all brunettes between the ages of 25 and 31, all of whom met their murderer at the Barrowland Ballroom, a dance hall and music venue in the city. The perpetrator has never been identified and the case remains unsolved and one of the most extensive manhunts in Scottish criminal history. The case was the first time in Scotland in which the Crown Office authorised publication of a composite drawing of a person suspected of murder.

This unidentified serial killer became known as "Bible John" due to his having repeatedly quoted from the Bible and to have condemned adultery while in the company of his final victim. The known movements and modus operandi of the convicted serial killer and rapist Peter Tobin gave rise to speculation that he might be Bible John, after his conviction for three murders in the late 2000s, but police later eliminated him as a suspect.

== First murders ==
=== Patricia Docker ===
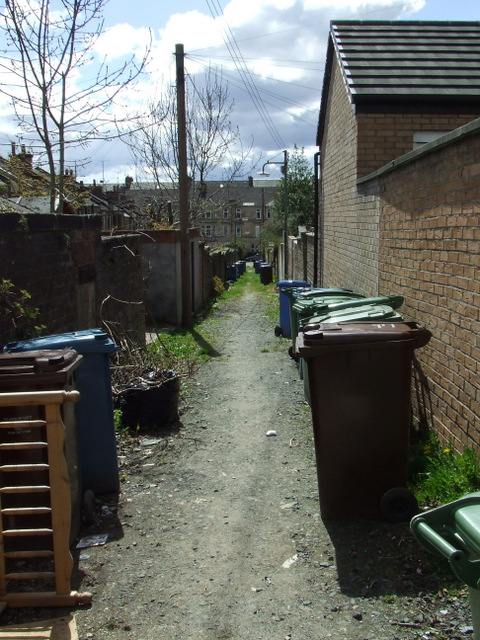
The alleyway in which Docker's body was discovered, pictured in 2013

On 23 February 1968, the naked body of a 25-year-old auxiliary nurse named Patricia Docker was discovered in the doorway of a lock-up garage in the alleyway behind 27 Carmichael Place in the Battlefield district. The location of her body was a few streets away from her home in Langside Place. Her body bore evidence of extensive blunt force trauma, particularly to the face and head. She had been strangled to death with a strong ligature, possibly a belt. Docker's handbag, watch, clothes and jewellery (other than her wedding ring) were missing from the crime scene; her shoes were recovered at the scene. Her clothing was never found, but her handbag was later recovered from the River Cart by an underwater search unit just west of the Langside Drive bridge; underpants and some lipstick that were also believed to be Docker's were additionally found at this location. Docker's watch casing and bracelet were recovered from water close to the murder scene.

Extensive door-to-door inquiries in the area produced a witness who recalled possibly hearing a female twice briefly shout "Let me go" the previous evening. This witness stated she could not detect if the female was in distress as she heard no screams or sounds of commotion. Furthermore, the attendees of a party in a flat overlooking the alleyway also informed investigators they had seen and heard nothing unusual. Little incontrovertible evidence was discovered at the crime scene; Docker's father identified his daughter's body the following day.

A postmortem conducted by Gilbert Forbes at the University of Glasgow Medical School confirmed that the cause of death had been strangulation, and that Docker's body bore no clear evidence of sexual assault. (Note: A 1996 reinvestigation into Docker's murder also concluded she had not been sexually assaulted or raped either before or after her murder.) Furthermore, the stage of rigor mortis upon her body at the time of discovery indicated she had likely died several hours prior to the discovery of her body.

Docker was a married mother of one, estranged from her husband. On the night of her murder, her parents had been under the impression she would spend the evening dancing at the Majestic Ballroom on Hope Street, although for unknown reasons, she is believed to have chosen to spend the majority of the evening at the Barrowland Ballroom, probably because of the 'Over-25s' night which it hosted each Thursday. Ten days into police inquiries, a witness was found who stated he had seen Docker at the Barrowland. Ultimately, however, the police were unable to find any reliable or detailed witness sightings of Docker at either the Majestic or Barrowland Ballroom that evening. When Docker failed to return home that evening, her parents assumed she had spent the night with a friend.

Investigators theorised Docker may have been killed elsewhere and her body discarded at the location of her discovery. The general incline of Carmichael Place would have allowed a car to enter the location quietly and without the driver using the engine, and the use of a vehicle would have enabled the killer to discreetly take the missing clothing and jewellery from the crime scene without being seen.

Police believed Docker's murder had occurred at around midnight. A sighting of a white Ford Consul 375 driving in the adjacent roads shortly before midnight was ruled out when the occupants came forward; a sighting of a woman entering a light-coloured Morris 1000 Traveller driven by a man at a bus stop on Langside Avenue at approximately 11:10 pm was not discounted from police inquiries, as these people were never traced.

By March, 700 of the city's 1,300 taxi drivers had been questioned, as it was unclear how Docker had actually travelled home on the night of her murder. A few weeks into the investigation, an anonymous letter was posted from the north of England by a woman police believed may have been in Glasgow city centre on the night of Docker's death and who may have known the identity of the killer. Details of the letter were released to the press, and police publicly appealed for the woman to come forward, saying the information in the letter was "vital", but she never did.

=== Jemima MacDonald ===
On Saturday, 16 August 1969, Jemima MacDonald, a 31-year-old mother of three, also spent the evening dancing at the Barrowland Ballroom. MacDonald was a regular attendee of the Barrowland and, according to family custom, her sister, Margaret O'Brien, took care of her three children in her absence. As midnight approached, she was seen by several people in the company of a young, well-dressed and well-spoken man of slim build, aged between 25 and 35 and between 6 ft 0 in (1.83 m) and 6 ft 2 in (1.88 m) in height. The man had short hair variously described by witnesses as being fair, ginger, or dark brown with fair streaks.

MacDonald was seen leaving the Barrowland at approximately 12:30 am on 17 August in the company of this individual, walking towards either Main Street or Landressy Street, in the general direction of her home. The last confirmed sighting of her was made by a neighbour at 12:40 am; she was standing with the man at the entrance to the derelict property where her body was later discovered, and the neighbour observed she appeared to have been quite unconcerned, waving nonchalantly.

O'Brien became concerned when her sister failed to return home. Later the same day, she began hearing local rumours that young children had been seen leaving a derelict tenement building in MacKeith Street discussing a body in the premises. By Monday morning, O'Brien was so concerned that she herself, fearing the worst, walked into the old building, where she discovered her sister's extensively battered body lying face down, with her shoes and stockings lying beside her.

A postmortem revealed that MacDonald had been extensively beaten, particularly about the face, before she had been strangled to death, possibly with her own stockings. Her murder had occurred approximately 30 hours before the discovery of her body. Like Docker, MacDonald had been menstruating at the time of her death, although unlike Docker, MacDonald's body was discovered fully clothed.

Investigators were unable to conclusively determine whether MacDonald had engaged in sexual activity—consensual or otherwise—prior to her murder, and although her other clothing was somewhat disrupted, the two pairs of pants she was wearing appeared to have been undisturbed. (Note: MacDonald's handbag was never found.)

Police inquiries into MacDonald's movements on the night of her murder produced several eyewitnesses who were able to accurately describe the man in whose company she had been seen at the Barrowland. Door-to-door inquiries on MacKeith Street also produced a woman who remembered hearing female screams on the evening of MacDonald's murder, but she could not recall the precise time. Consequently, police considered this information of little use to their inquiry.

== Initial investigation ==
The City of Glasgow Police noted several striking similarities between the murders of Docker and MacDonald, including that both women had attended the Barrowland Ballroom on the evening of their murder, been beaten before being strangled to death with a ligature, were menstruating, and had their handbags taken from the crime scene, but initially both murders were not considered to be the work of the same perpetrator.

Despite extensive public appeals, the investigation into the murder of Docker had quickly become a cold case. Police had little information, owing to both a lack of witnesses and hard evidence. The investigation had also been severely hindered by investigators not discovering until three days after her death that Docker had attended the Barrowland on the evening of her murder. Eighteen months later, following the discovery of MacDonald, police became aware of remarkable similarities to the murder of Docker. Police did not conclusively link both murders to the same perpetrator, but they could not completely discount this theory. In addition, police were certain the perpetrator(s) held a high degree of local geographical knowledge. However, they may have been a stranger to the district, as none of the eyewitnesses the investigators spoke to knew the man or men seen in the company of either woman prior to her murder.

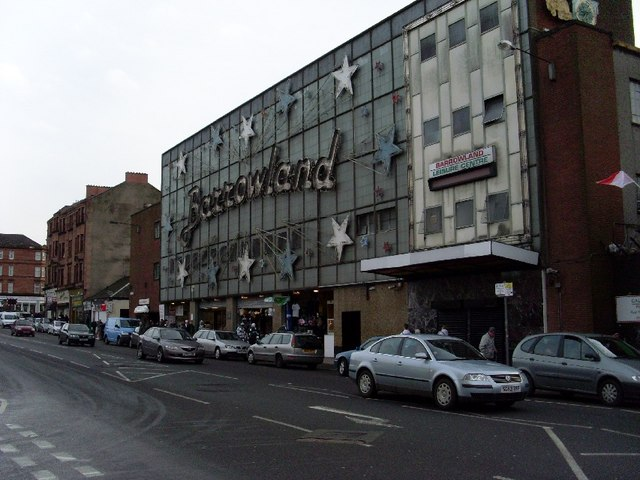
The Barrowland Ballroom, where each victim is believed to have encountered Bible John, pictured in 2011

For the first time in a Scottish murder hunt, a composite drawing of the man MacDonald had last been seen alive with was given to the press, being widely distributed via both newspapers and television throughout Scotland in an effort to identify the suspect. Male and female undercover police officers performed discreet surveillance at the Barrowland Ballroom in efforts to identify the suspect. Police surveillance at the Barrowland Ballroom was terminated in late October 1969 due to the initiative's failure to produce any suspects. Detectives were also blamed by proprietors for a sharp decrease in attendance figures.

=== Helen Puttock ===
On 31 October 1969, a man walking his dog discovered the body of 29-year-old Helen Puttock behind a tenement in the Scotstoun district. Her body was found beside a drainpipe in the back garden of her Earl Street flat. She had been stripped partially naked, extensively beaten about the face before being raped, then strangled to death with one of her own stockings. The contents of her handbag had been scattered close to her body; the handbag itself was missing from the crime scene. Grass and weed stains upon the soles of Puttock's feet and shoes indicated that she had engaged in a ferocious struggle with her killer. She had evidently, at one point, attempted to scale a nearby railway embankment. Her body also bore a deep bite mark on her wrist. As had been the case with the two previous victims, Helen had been menstruating at the time of her murder. Her murderer had placed her sanitary towel beneath her left armpit.

The evening prior to the murder, Puttock and her sister Jean Langford had been to the Barrowland Ballroom, where both had become acquainted with two men, both named John. One of them had said he worked as a slater and resided in the Castlemilk district, while the other had been a well-spoken man who did not disclose where he lived. After being in the company of these two men for more than an hour, all four left the Barrowland to head home. The man named John who had been Jean's dance partner walked to George Square to board a bus, (Note: Police later issued an appeal for this man to come forward as a witness but he never responded to this appeal.) while Langford, Puttock, and the man who had been Puttock's dance partner hailed a taxi. The trio set off from Glasgow Cross, making a 20-minute westwards journey towards Langford's home in Knightswood. During the trio's conversation in the cab, most of the crucial information pertaining to Bible John's psychological profile became apparent.

== Suspect ==
The suspect was described by Puttock's sister Jean Langford as being a tall, slim and well-dressed young man wearing a brown and well-cut Reid and Taylor brand suit, with reddish, sandy or fair hair rounded neatly at the back. His wristwatch had a military-style broad leather strap, and, unusually, he was wearing unfashionable leather half-boots. He was aged between 25 and 30, approximately 5 feet 10 inches (1.78 m) to 6 feet 0 inches (1.83 m) in height, and had blue-grey eyes. She noticed that two of his front top teeth overlapped, and that one of his teeth at the back right-hand side of his mouth was missing. She said that she thought he had said his surname was something like "Templeton", "Sempleson", or "Emerson", and he had been polite and well-spoken. Langford had also observed that he "wasn't the Barrowland type" as the majority of men who frequented the dance hall were somewhat rougher, and she said that he also was not a particularly good dancer.

Before they left the dance hall, Langford had attempted to use an Embassy-brand cigarette machine which had jammed and failed to dispense her purchase. This incident caused a sudden change in the suspect's previously polite demeanour; he demanded to see the manager, with whom he argued aggressively, and asked to know who the local member of Parliament was. He then turned and told the group: "My father said these places are dens of iniquity. They once set fire to this place to get the insurance money and did it up with the money they got." Langford then witnessed the man show Puttock an identity card, which seemed to impress her; however, when Langford asked to see the ID herself, the man declined and said while tapping his nose: "You know what happens to nosey folk."

Much of the information about the suspect came from the conversations the trio had on their 20-minute taxi ride home. The man said he disapproved of married women going to the Barrowland Ballroom, and when the women told him they were married he responded with a reference to the Bible, saying "you know what happens to the adulterous wife? She gets stoned to death". (Note: The suspect's referencing the Old Testament led to Evening Times journalist John Quinn naming the unknown murderer "Bible John".) He also commented to the women, "I don't drink at Hogmanay; I pray", although he said that he was familiar with several drinking premises in the Yoker district. He said he was an only child but contradicted this soon after by saying he had a sister, adding that alcohol was not allowed in his home and that when his sister came home drunk once she was refused entry to the house. Langford was of the impression that the man regretted mentioning his sister and tried to redirect the conversation to foster homes and foster children. He revealed that he knew the fares, and possibly the times, for both the buses and the Blue Train services north of the River Clyde. As the taxi travelled along the Kingsway the man said he recognised the high-rise flats and said something about his father or another relative having worked there, and that a children's home had once been there. Langford said that the man appeared to be evasive when asked some questions. He had a Glaswegian accent.

When Langford asked the man whether he supported Rangers or Celtic, the man responded saying "I'm agnostic". He made reference to, although did not specifically quote, the Bible. Langford also recalled his mentioning he had at one stage worked in a laboratory, that his family had a caravan in Irvine, and that although he played golf badly, his cousin had recently scored a hole in one. Even though the man seemed to say he did not smoke during the earlier Embassy cigarette machine incident, he then revealed his own packet of Embassy cigarettes and offered one to Puttock, although he did not offer any to Langford and took none himself. Langford stated that it had become increasingly clear to her as the trio had ridden in the taxi that this man had considered her presence in the vehicle to be an inconvenience. The man insisted that the taxi take Langford home first before Puttock, even though she lived further away.

Langford last sighted the pair being driven off in the taxi after she was dropped off at her home in Kelso Street. The taxi driver, Alexander Hannah, was later traced and provided further details of the last part of the journey, explaining that the man had been unable to pay the fare when they arrived in Earl Street (even though he had said he would pay earlier), so Puttock had given him the money to pay the taxi driver out of her purse. Hannah was unfamiliar with the route and made some wrong turns during the last part of the journey, causing Puttock to become frustrated and ask him to stop on Earl Street. Hannah also noted that after paying the fare, the suspect had caught up with Puttock and grabbed her, causing Puttock to resist; however, Hannah had assumed the two were simply "lovers having a tiff".

=== Final sighting ===
The last possible sighting of the suspect was made by the driver, conductor and passengers of a night service bus, who noticed a man matching the description given by Langford "walking quickly ... in a determined manner" along Dumbarton Road and then boarding their bus at approximately 2:00 am on 31 October. He was in a particularly dishevelled state, with mud stains on his jacket and a livid red mark or scratch on his cheek just beneath one eye. These witnesses also recalled his repeatedly tucking a short cuff of one sleeve into his jacket sleeve (a man's cufflink was later found alongside Puttock's body). He had also paid for the fare from a distinctive red purse likely belonging to Puttock, whose red purse was missing from the crime scene. The man got off the bus at the junction of Argyle Street and Derby Street/Gray Street.

Contemporary police records show that investigators gave particular credence to these sightings because the physical description of this individual was markedly similar to Langford's description of Puttock's companion at the Barrowland. (Note: This sighting was also considered important by individuals who re-investigated Puttock's murder in 1996.) It was initially believed that the man may have used the nearby Govan ferry to cross the River Clyde to the south of the city, but the ferrymen working that night could not remember such an individual.

=== Link to series ===
The murder of Helen Puttock held remarkable similarities to the two previous murders, further raising suspicions that all three murders had been committed by the same person. Each of the victims had been the mother of at least one child and had met her murderer at the Barrowland Ballroom. The handbag of each woman was missing. Each victim had been strangled to death, and at least two of these women had been raped prior to their murders. Each of the three women had been escorted home by her killer and murdered within yards of her door. Additionally, all had been menstruating at the time of death and had their sanitary towel or tampon placed upon, beneath, or near their body. This led to speculation that the women had been murdered for their refusal to engage in intercourse with their murderer, due to their periods.

"It is quite incredible that this man has eluded us. I am positive this man comes from Glasgow or nearby. He is between 25 and 30, between 5 ft 10 in and 6 ft tall, has light red hair, good features, blue-grey eyes, and a smart modern appearance. I do not think he is a very religious man, but just has a normal intelligent working knowledge of the Bible which he likes to air ... there must be many people who know someone who looks like this artist's impression."

— Detective Superintendent Joe Beattie, describing the prime suspect in the Bible John murders (1972).

== Ongoing investigation ==
Within hours of the discovery of the body of Helen Puttock, an additional composite drawing of the suspect was created using the detailed description provided by her sister. Langford saw the earlier image created after the murder of Jemima MacDonald and believed it was an excellent likeness. (Note: At the headquarters of the City of Glasgow Police, Jean Langford happened to view an earlier composite drawing created relating to the chief suspect in the murder of Jemima McDonald. Upon viewing this Identikit, Langford exclaimed, "That man looks just like him!") Detective Superintendent Joe Beattie asked the public to study this composite drawing closely, should it resemble anyone they knew. Due to the suspect's hair being unfashionably short for the era, over 450 hairdressers in and around Glasgow were shown the updated drawing of the suspect, and all dentists in and around the city were asked to examine their records to determine whether they held records of a male patient with overlapping incisors and a missing tooth in the upper right jaw. Both lines of inquiry proved fruitless. The police also produced an artist's impression portrait, created by Lennox Patterson, Registrar of the Glasgow School of Art, based on the recollections of Puttock's sister. In June 1970, police employed the photofit system in an attempt to produce a better likeness of the suspect. This was the first instance this method of identifying a murder suspect was used in Scotland.

More than 100 detectives were assigned to work full-time on the case, and 50,000 witness statements were taken in door-to-door inquiries. Ultimately, more than 5,000 potential suspects were questioned in the first year of the inquiry alone, and Jean Langford was required to attend over 300 identity parades, but she was adamant none of those required to participate in these identity parades had been the man with whom she had last seen her sister, and all were cleared of any involvement. Fearing that the perpetrator would strike again, a team of 16 detectives was instructed to mingle with dancers at all dance halls in Glasgow. In particular, these detectives frequented the Barrowland on Thursday and Saturday nights at the over-25s events, where each victim was presumed to have met her murderer. (Note: Two of the three victims murdered by Bible John had been killed on a Thursday, and one on a Saturday.)

Despite the extensive manhunt, no further developments arose and the investigation into the three murders gradually became cold, with many officers assigned to the case believing that the perpetrator had either died, been jailed for an unrelated offence, had been incarcerated at a mental hospital, or that senior police officers had known his actual identity but had been unable to prove he had committed the murders. Others speculated that he may have simply moved away from the Glasgow district, or murdered whenever in the vicinity; this possibility prompted police to circulate multiple copies of the composite drawing at all British Army, Navy, and Air Force bases in the United Kingdom, Europe, and the Middle and Far East; this line of inquiry failed to produce any significant leads.

== Potential suspects ==
=== John Edgar/"John White" ===
Les Brown, who worked on the Bible John case as a junior detective, claimed in 2005 that he had identified a likely suspect at the time but that he was dismissed simply because he did not have notably overlapping front teeth. The man had been found arguing with a young woman in the Barrowland, and Brown said that he closely resembled the facial composite of Bible John. The man subsequently supplied police with a false name and address before revealing his true name and address in the Gorbals. The man's real name was John Edgar.

Several years later, Brown spoke at length to a detective who had taken the same man to a hospital after arresting him outside the Barrowland Ballroom at the time of the murders. The suspect had needed several stitches in his head following an altercation, and as soon as his handcuffs had been released, he escaped from the hospital. At the time of this incident, he had also falsely given his name to medical personnel as John White. In addition to this basic circumstantial evidence, the "whole demeanour" of the man had led Les Brown and several of his colleagues to believe he may have been the perpetrator.

After Brown wrote of his suspicions in his 2005 autobiography, the man came forward and offered to provide a DNA sample in order to clear his name. This led to his elimination as a suspect. The author Paul Harrison has also criticised the theory, pointing to how Brown contradicted himself by voicing his opinions that Peter Tobin may have been responsible.

=== David Henderson ===
In 1983, a Lanarkshire contractor named Harry Wyllie contacted Strathclyde Police; he claimed to conclusively know that his friend David Henderson had been Bible John, adding that both he and Henderson had been raised in the Cranhill district of Glasgow and both had frequented the Barrowland Ballroom in the 1960s. Wyllie had, he claimed, read an article in the Evening Times five years previously before suddenly realising his friend had been the perpetrator of the murders. The alleged suspect was traced living in the Netherlands, married to a Dutch woman. Subsequently, police questioned Henderson and eliminated him as a suspect. Langford also told police that Henderson did not look like the killer.

=== Hannah Martin rapist ===
In the years following the Bible John murders, several women came forward to claim that they had been sexually assaulted after an evening at the Barrowland. One of these women, Hannah Martin, claimed that she had been assaulted and raped by Bible John and had subsequently given birth to his child in January 1970; a daughter she initially named Isobel. (Note: The child was later renamed by her mother.)

In April 1969, Martin had left the Barrowland in the company of a tall man with whom she then had sex, and then accepted his offer of a lift home. However, during the drive, the man's sexual demeanour became more aggressive, and Martin, drunk and terrified she may be attacked, vomited in the man's car. He then bundled her out of the car and drove off, leaving her standing on the pavement. One author, David Leslie, has claimed that Martin's daughter could be the one indubitable link to the identity of Bible John.

=== John Irvine McInnes ===
In 1996, Strathclyde Police exhumed the body of John Irvine McInnes from a graveyard in Stonehouse, South Lanarkshire. McInnes, who had served in the Scots Guards, had died by suicide in 1980 at the age of 41, by severing the brachial artery in his upper arm. He was an early suspect in the Bible John investigation and cousin to a senior police officer. Moreover, a business card for Moylan's furniture store (where McInnes worked) was found at the scene of Puttock's murder. However, Jean Langford had not picked him out in numerous identity parades (although McInnes was allegedly not included in the original identity parades), and she continued to insist in 1996 that McInnes was not Bible John. A DNA sample was taken from McInnes's body for comparison with semen samples found on the stockings belonging to Helen Puttock and which had been used to strangle her. (Note: According to a contemporary psychiatrist's report, the unusual method of suicide chosen by McInnes was akin to psychopathy, leading to suggestions McInnes may have opted to take his own life in search of the "ultimate thrill".) The results of the testing conducted proved inconclusive, with then-Lord Advocate Lord Mackay stating insufficient evidence existed to link McInnes with the murder of Helen Puttock. The Crown officially cleared McInnes of any involvement in the Bible John murders in July 1996.

Strathclyde Police and the McInnes family pathologist confirmed in 2005 that further advancements in DNA testing had now enabled a match between McInnes's DNA and the killer's to be fully disproven.

=== Peter Tobin ===
Some have speculated that the convicted serial killer Peter Tobin may have been Bible John. He had lived in Shettleston in Glasgow in the late 1960s; he then relocated to England in August 1969 (before the final two murders committed by Bible John) after marrying his first wife, whom he had met at the Barrowland Ballroom in 1968. (Note: A former detective named Joe Jackson, who had helped investigate the Bible John murders in the 1960s, has stated that he suspected Tobin may have been the perpetrator shortly after he was arrested for the murder of Polish student Angelika Kluk in 2006, adding: "When I saw his photograph, I thought, 'This is as near to Bible John as you are going to get. This looks a winner.' He fitted the bill in every way, and he had connections with religion.") The amount of violence Tobin inflicted on his known victims between 1991 and 2006 and his level of organisation did not suggest the work of an amateur, leading some to believe he may have killed prior to his first known victims. However, one discrepancy is that Bible John displayed his victims' bodies in public places, whereas Tobin buried all his known victims.

Some contemporary visual similarities exist between Tobin when aged in his 20s and the 1969 composite drawing of Bible John, although the composite drawing showed Bible John with red hair and contemporary pictures of Tobin show he did not have this hair colour. In addition, all three of Tobin's former wives have given accounts of being repeatedly imprisoned, throttled, beaten and raped by him, and each has stated he had been driven to extreme physical violence by the female menstrual cycle (a factor long suspected by investigators as being the perpetrator's motive behind the murders). In addition, Tobin is known to have been a staunch Roman Catholic with strong religious views, (Note: One of Tobin's former wives claimed Tobin was not particularly religious.) and the alias Bible John may have given to Jean Langford and Helen Puttock in 1969 is similar to one of the pseudonyms known to have been regularly used by Tobin: John Semple. (Note: Langford had claimed to investigators Bible John had given his name as either John Emerson, John Templeton, or John Sempleson.)

David Wilson, a criminologist, strongly believes the available evidence supports his theory that Tobin is Bible John; others have criticised his theory. He has stated that the moment he believed Tobin was Bible John occurred during Tobin's trial for the 1991 murder of 18-year-old Dinah McNicol, in which a witness's trial testimony of what Tobin had said in the company of herself and McNicol on the evening of McNicol's abduction contained notable similarities to things reportedly said by Bible John. Some important points of overlap were both men mentioning they did not drink at Hogmanay and having a cousin who had once scored a hole-in-one in a game of golf. This information, alongside other circumstantial evidence, led Wilson to state: "I didn't set out to prove Tobin was Bible John, but I would stake my professional reputation on it."

Operation Anagram

As a result of a police investigation named Operation Anagram, which was initiated in 2006 to trace the movements of Tobin throughout the decades and to determine his potential culpability in any other crimes, a woman informed investigators she had been raped by Tobin after she had met him at the Barrowland Ballroom in 1968, shortly after the first of the murders believed to have been committed by Bible John. However, Operation Anagram found no other evidence to support the theory that Tobin was Bible John.

Elimination as a suspect

Tobin has since been eliminated as a suspect by police. Although often reported that Tobin moved from Glasgow to Brighton after the 1969 murders, he in fact relocated from Glasgow to Brighton with his fiancée, Margaret Mountney, before the second murder attributed to Bible John. Operation Anagram discovered that Tobin was in Brighton at the time of the final two Bible John murders. He had married his first wife in Brighton on 6 August 1969, 10 days before the 16 August murder of Jemima MacDonald, as recorded on their marriage certificate. Tobin's wife testified the pair were still on their honeymoon in Brighton at the time of the murder of the second victim, and she insists he was with her at the time. She has strongly criticised the theory that Tobin is Bible John. Tobin was in police custody regarding an unrelated crime when another of the killings occurred. He was also still living in Brighton at the time of the third murder, meaning he would have had to travel without his wife's knowledge to Glasgow and back from Brighton to have committed the murder of Helen Puttock.

Tobin's DNA was checked against the semen sample for Bible John as part of Operation Anagram. The results of this analysis conclusively proved the bodily fluid did not originate from Tobin. Wilson has questioned the DNA evidence, but the police also have a record of the bite mark that was found on Helen Puttock's wrist which they can cross-check with Tobin's dental records, as had been done with John McInnes when he was exhumed and subsequently eliminated as a suspect in 1996. Tobin also had a distinctive scar under his left eye at the time, and no witnesses reported Bible John as having such a scar, and Tobin was also 5 ft 6 in, much shorter than the witness accounts of Bible John. The key witness with Bible John in the taxi, Jean Langford, also insisted that Tobin was nothing like the man.

David Swindle, the senior investigating officer in charge of Operation Anagram, has stated that there is no evidence to link Tobin to the Bible John murders, and Operation Anagram eventually discounted the theory. Swindle had previously presided over the 2002 review of the Bible John murders, four years before the initial discoveries of Tobin's murders.

In his 2010 book, The Lost British Serial Killer, the author David Wilson claimed that Peter Tobin was Bible John, but his co-writer, Paul Harrison, later recanted the claims they made in it. In 2013, Harrison published a new book, instead claiming that Bible John was a police officer. Harrison concluded: "the obnoxious little pervert that Tobin has been proven to be is not the killer referred to as Bible John".

=== Domestic violence theory ===
A former crime editor for the Daily Record newspaper, Jane Hamilton, has since stated that detectives she has interviewed who had reviewed the Bible John case files in the 1980s were of the belief that two of the murders linked to Bible John were actually domestic incidents.

Patricia Docker's estranged husband Alex had been an early suspect in her murder. The two had married in 1963, but their marriage had been an unhappy one, and the issue of divorce had been raised between them more than once. The marriage further deteriorated shortly after a posting to Cyprus – where Docker is believed to have conducted at least one affair – followed by a brief move to Digby, Lincolnshire, where Alex Docker was an RAF corporal. Docker had decided to return to Glasgow with their son (b. 1964) in April 1967; she and her son lived with her parents at the time of her murder.

Alex–who claimed to have last seen Docker at her home in October 1967 when the two had met to discuss divorce—was considered by police to have had a possible motive to kill his estranged wife. He had sought a hasty divorce in order to marry his new partner, with whom he is known to have signed a hotel register on the day after Patricia's murder as 'husband and wife'. Furthermore, investigators discovered that he had also been on leave from RAF Digby in Scotland at the time of the murder. The pair were actively contemplating divorce at the time of Docker's murder, having corresponded about the issue in early 1968.

Shortly after Docker's murder, her husband had taken their son from his grandparents to live with him and his new partner in Lincolnshire. (Note: In 2022, Docker's son stated that his father was now dead.)

Jemima MacDonald had also recently separated from her husband at the time of her murder and had likewise moved back to Glasgow the year prior to her death. Her former husband stated in 2022 that police had considered him a suspect and that he had been repeatedly questioned regarding her murder.

Contemporary police reports indicate MacDonald had visited the Barrowland for three successive nights in the week prior to her murder, and that she was "in receipt of public funds, plus maintenance from the fathers of her children". Reflecting the attitudes of the time, following MacDonald's murder, the press devoted extensive focus on the fact MacDonald had borne three children by two different men; her two youngest with a man described as a 'West Indian', and her eldest with a man described only as a Yugoslav national she had reportedly met in Liverpool.

Helen Puttock's husband, George, was conclusively eliminated as a suspect in his wife's murder in 1996 after his DNA was tested against the semen samples discovered upon his wife's stockings and was found not to match. Castings of his teeth were also found not to match the bite mark the killer had left upon her wrist.

== Aftermath ==
No further murder victims killed in Scotland or elsewhere in the United Kingdom have ever been conclusively attributed to Bible John, and the manhunt for this murderer was one of the most extensive manhunts in Scottish criminal history. The murders of the three women remain unsolved, but the case remains open, with many investigators remaining certain that the perpetrator(s) of these crimes were highly likely to have been shielded by one or more individuals he or they had known.

No uniform consensus exists that the three killings were actually the work of the same person. It has been claimed that the gap of 18 months between the first two killings is unusual for a serial killer, (Note: Professor David Wilson has stated that a lapse of time approximating 18 months is not unusual between a serial killer's first and second murders.) and that the later two murders may have either been copycat killings, or the sole two committed by the same perpetrator. Criticism has also been levelled against the police for potentially hampering their own investigation by prematurely jumping to the conclusion that all three murders had been committed by the same person.

In 2004, police announced their intentions to genetically test several men in a further attempt to identify the perpetrator, with all concerned being requested to submit blood samples. This followed the previous discovery of an 80% genetic match from the semen samples retrieved from the final crime scene attributed to Bible John with a DNA sample retrieved at the site of a minor crime committed two years earlier. The sample was enough of a match to lead officers to believe that the person who committed the offence was related to the killer.

The sole witness ever to have engaged in a lengthy conversation with Bible John, Jean Langford, died in September 2010 at the age of 74. Langford had given police the description used to form the second composite drawing created of the suspect, which remains the most significant clue as to the perpetrator's physical appearance. Despite Professor Wilson's assertion that Peter Tobin may have been Bible John, when Langford discussed her sister's murderer many decades later, she dismissed this theory, stating emphatically that Tobin had not been the man she had shared a taxi with on the night of her sister's murder.

== Media ==
=== Books ===
- Bavin-Mizzi, Jill (2024). Bible John: A New Suspect. London: Europe Books. ISBN 979-1-220-14978-5.
- Crow, Peter; Samson, Peter (1998). Bible John: Hunt for a Killer. Glasgow: First Press Publishing. ISBN 978-1-901-60300-2.
- García, Francisco (2023). We All Go into the Dark: The Hunt for Bible John. New York: HarperCollins Publishers Limited. ISBN 978-0-008-53145-4.
- Harrison, Paul (2013). Dancing with the Devil: The Bible John Murders. Skipton: Vertical. ISBN 978-1-904-09173-8.
- Simpson, Donald (2001). Power in the Blood: Whatever Happened to Bible John. London: Bandwagon. ISBN 978-0-954-17810-9.
- Stoddart, Charles (1980). Bible John: Search for a Sadist. Edinburgh: Paul Harris. ISBN 978-0-904-50589-4.

=== Television ===
- The BBC has broadcast a 30-minute documentary focusing on the murders committed by Bible John. Presented by Hugh Cochrane, this episode was screened on 18 September 1970, and concluded with a direct quote from Jeremiah, Chapter 23, Verse 24, appealing to the perpetrator to hand himself in to the police: 'Can any hide himself in secret places, that I shall not see him? saith the Lord?
- Granada Television have broadcast a drama-documentary focusing on the murder of Helen Puttock as part of the true crime drama television series In Suspicious Circumstances. This episode, titled "Dancing With Death", was first broadcast on 23 March 1993 and focuses upon the murder of Helen Puttock.
- Channel Four has broadcast a 25-minute documentary upon the Bible John murders. Titled Calling Bible John, this documentary was presented by Andrew O'Hagan and was first broadcast in March 1996.
- The case of Bible John featured in a December 2005 episode of Unsolved. Narrated by Alex Norton, the program primarily focuses on the death of the final victim, Helen Puttock, and includes interviews with Puttock's husband George.
- STV has broadcast a 45-minute documentary focusing on the murders committed by Bible John. This documentary, titled In Search of Bible John, was initially broadcast in 2011, and explores the possibility that Peter Tobin may have been the perpetrator of the three murders.
- A two-part documentary by BBC Scotland focuses on the manhunt for Bible John. Titled The Hunt for Bible John, this episode was first broadcast by BBC Scotland in November 2021 and across the UK on BBC Two in January 2022. The programme featured contributions from George Puttock, writer Andrew O'Hagan, journalist Magnus Linklater and psychologist David Canter.

=== Radio/Podcast ===
BBC Sounds have broadcast a 13-part series focusing upon the murders committed by Bible John. Presented by journalist Audrey Gillan and titled Bible John: Creation of a Serial Killer, this series was broadcast between 29 September and 7 December 2022.

== See also ==
- Capital punishment in the United Kingdom
- List of fugitives from justice who disappeared
- List of serial killers by number of victims
- List of serial killers in the United Kingdom
- Unsolved murders in the United Kingdom

== Cited works and further reading ==
- Blundell, Nigel (1998) [1997]. Encyclopedia of Serial Killers. London: PRC Publishing. ISBN 978-1-856-48328-5.
- Bobonich, Christopher; Bobonich, Harry (2013). Bloody Ivy: 13 Unsolved Campus Murders. Bloomington: AuthorHouse. ISBN 978-1-4817-4019-7.
- Brown, Les; Jeffrey, Robert (2005). Glasgow Crimefighter: The Les Brown Story. Edinburgh: Black & White Publishing. ISBN 978-1-845-02801-5.
- Cawthorne, Nigel (2007). The Mammoth Book of Killers at Large. London: Constable & Robinson Ltd. ISBN 978-1-845-29631-5.
- Cawthorne, Nigel (2014). Bodies in the Back Garden: True Stories of Brutal Murders Close to Home. London: John Blake Publishing. ISBN 978-1-782-19986-1.
- Day, Jeremy (1995). Ultimate Crimes: The Hunt Goes On for Bible John. London, England: Nexus Media. ISSN 1358-8516.
- Drake, Phillip (2024). Unsolved Murders of the UK: Cold Cases from 1951 to Present Day. Barnsley: Pen and Sword. ISBN 978-1-399-03259-9.
- Jackson, Joe (2011). Chasing Killers: Three Decades of Cracking Crime in the UK's Murder Capital. Edinburgh: Mainstream Publishing. ISBN 978-1-845-96879-3.
- Jeffrey, Robert (2006). Crimes Past: Glasgow's Crimes of the Century. Edinburgh: Black and White Publishings. ISBN 978-1-845-02090-3.
- Lane, Brian; Gregg, Wilfred (1995) [1992]. The Encyclopedia of Serial Killers. New York City: Berkley Books. ISBN 0-425-15213-8.
- Leslie, David (2007). Bible John's Secret Daughter: Murder, Drugs and a Mother's Secret Heartbreak. Edinburgh: Mainstream Publishing. ISBN 978-1-780-57120-1.
- Lloyd, Georgina (1986). One Was Not Enough: True Stories of Multiple Murderers. London: Bantam Books. ISBN 978-0-553-17605-6.
- Malloy, Andrew D. (2011). Bible John – Closure. Kent: Pneuma Springs Publishing. ISBN 978-1-907-72816-7.
- Newton, Michael (2004). The Encyclopedia of Unsolved Crimes. New York: Facts on File. ISBN 978-0-816-07818-9.
- O'Hagan, Andrew (1996). The Missing. New York: New Press. ISBN 978-1-565-84335-6.
- Skelton, Douglas (1994). Blood on the Thistle: A Casebook of 20th Century Scottish Murder. London: HarperCollins. ISBN 978-1-851-58468-0.
- Stoddart, Charles (1980). Bible John: Search for a Sadist. Edinburgh: Paul Harris Publishing. ISBN 978-0-904-50589-4.
- Terry, Stephen (2011). Glasgow Almanac: An A-Z of the City and its People. Glasgow: Neil Wilson Publishing. ISBN 978-1-906-47625-0.
- Whittington-Egan, Molly (1998). Scottish Murder Stories. Glasgow: Neil Wilson Publishing Ltd. ISBN 978-1-906-47647-2.
- Whittington-Egan, Richard; Whittington-Egan, Molly (1992). The Murder Almanac. Glasgow: Neil Wilson Publishing Ltd. ISBN 978-1-897-78404-4.
- Wier, Nigel (2011). British Serial Killers. Bloomington, Indiana: AuthorHouse Publishing. ISBN 978-1-467-88139-5.
- Wilson, David; Harrison, Paul (2010). The Lost British Serial Killer: Closing the Case on Peter Tobin and Bible John. London: Sphere. ISBN 978-0-751-54232-5.
- Wilson, Colin; Wilson, Damon; Wilson, Rowan (1993). World Famous Murders. London: Parragon Publishing. ISBN 978-0-752-50122-2.
