= 300 million yen robbery =

1968 bank robbery in Japan

Coordinates: 35°41′10″N 139°28′24″E

The 300 million yen robbery (三億円事件, San Oku En Jiken), also known as the 300 million yen affair or 300 million yen incident, was an armed robbery that took place in Tokyo, Japan, on December 10, 1968. A man posing as a police officer on a motorcycle stopped bank employees transferring money and stole 294 million yen. It is the single largest heist in Japanese history to date, and remains unsolved.

== Robbery ==
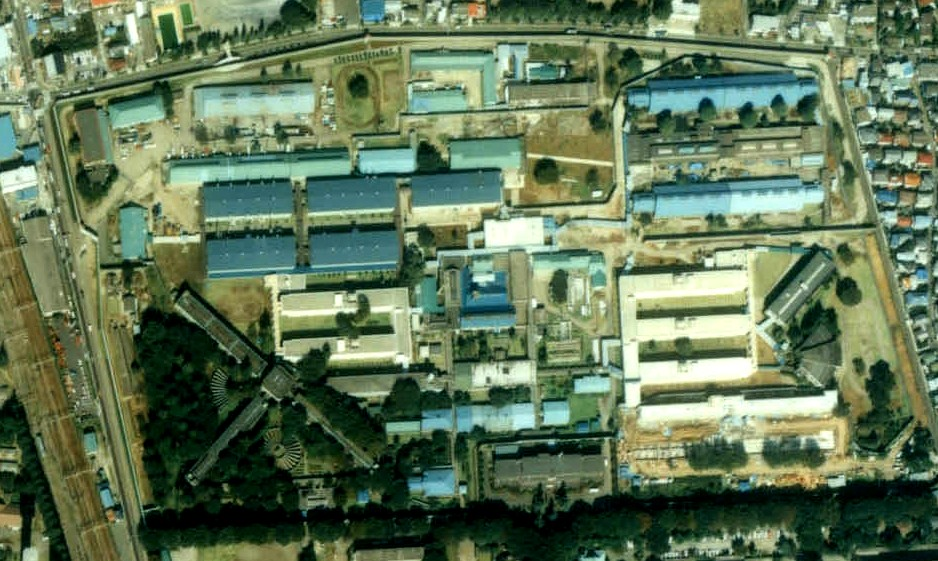
Fuchū Prison

On the morning of December 10, 1968, four Kokubunji branch employees of the Nihon Shintaku Ginko (Nippon Trust Bank) were transporting 294,307,500 yen (about US$817,520 at 1968 exchange rates and US$8,000,000+ at 2026 inflation rates) in the trunk of a Nissan Cedric company car. The metal boxes contained bonuses for the employees of Toshiba's Fuchu factory. A young man in the uniform of a motorcycle police officer blocked the path of the car, a mere 200 meters from its destination, in a street next to Tokyo Fuchū Prison.

The bogus police officer informed the bank employees that their bank branch manager's house had been destroyed by an explosion, and a warning had been received that an explosive device had been planted in the car. After the four employees exited the vehicle, the police officer crawled under the car. Moments later, he rolled out, shouting that the car was about to explode, and smoke and flames appeared underneath it. As the employees retreated from the vehicle, the police officer got into it and drove away.

== Investigation ==
The bank employees believed the thief was a police officer, and accepted his story about the bomb because threatening letters had been sent to the bank manager beforehand. The smoke and flames turned out to be the result of a warning flare he had ignited while under the car. At some point, the thief abandoned the bank's car and transferred the metal boxes to another car, stolen beforehand. That car too was abandoned, and the boxes transferred once again to another previously stolen vehicle.

There were 120 pieces of evidence left at the scene of the crime, including the "police" motorcycle, which had been painted white. However, the evidence was primarily common everyday items, scattered on purpose to confuse the police investigation. A 19-year-old man, the son of a police officer, was suspected just after the robbery. He died of potassium cyanide poisoning on December 15, 1968. He had no alibi. However, the money was not found at the time of his death. His death was deemed a suicide and he was considered not guilty, according to official record.

A massive police investigation was launched, posting 780,000 montage pictures throughout Japan. The list of suspects included 110,000 names, and 170,000 policemen participated in the investigation — the largest investigation in Japanese history. This includes an examination of the fingerprints gathered from the scene and comparison of them to those on file. Six million fingerprints on file were compared individually, however no matches were found.

On December 12, 1969, a 26-year-old man was suspected by the Mainichi Shimbun. He was arrested on an unrelated charge, but he had an alibi; the robbery occurred on the day he was taking a proctored examination. As the arrest was made based on false pretenses, the arresting police officer, Mitsuo Muto, was accused of abuse of power. A friend of the 19-year-old suspect was arrested on an unrelated charge on November 15, 1975, just before the statute of limitations. He had a large amount of money and was suspected of the robbery. He was 18 years old when the robbery occurred. The police asked him for an explanation for the large amount of money, but he did not say anything and they were not able to prove that his money had come from the robbery.

== Aftermath ==
After a seven-year investigation, police announced in December 1975 that the statute of limitations on the crime had passed. As of 1988, the thief has also been relieved of any civil liabilities, allowing him to tell his story without fear of legal repercussions. The case was profiled in 2001 on the show Project X, a NHK-TV series focusing on the accomplishments of Japanese of the Greatest Generation. The episode profiled fingerprint specialist Uhei Tsukamoto's attempt to solve the case and another robbery.

== See also ==
- Crime in Japan
- Yurakucho 300 million yen incident
- D. B. Cooper
- Isabella Stewart Gardner Museum theft, 1990, world's largest art theft from a museum in Boston, U.S., also perpetrated by thieves who disguised themselves as police officers
