= Hirohito surrender broadcast =

1945 radio broadcast by Japanese emperor

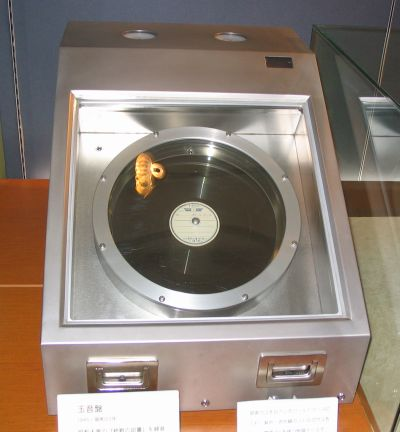
- The Gyokuon-hōsō record inside the NHK Museum of Broadcasting
- Other names: Gyokuon-hōsō; 玉音放送 (Shinjitai); 玉音󠄁放送󠄁 (Kyujitai)
- Running time: 4 minutes, 36 seconds
- Country of origin: Empire of Japan
- Language: Classical Japanese
- Home station: NHK
- Narrated by: Hirohito
- Recording studio: Imperial Palace, Tokyo
- Original release: August 15, 1945; 12:00 p.m. – 12:04 p.m.

The Hirohito surrender broadcast (Japanese: 玉音放送, Hepburn: Gyokuon-hōsō; lit. 'Broadcast of the Emperor's Voice') (Note: Sometimes translated as "Jewel Voice Broadcast," however, this translation did not appear commonly in print before the 2000s. The term 玉音 (gyokuon) is a calque of Chinese 玉音 (yùyīn, lit. "jade sound"), a term used for the voice of the Emperor of China; it was later adopted into a Japanese context. 玉 (gyoku) literally means "gem, jewel," particularly jadeite or nephrite.) was a radio broadcast of surrender given by Hirohito, the emperor of Japan, on August 15, 1945.

It announced to the Japanese people that the Japanese government had accepted the Potsdam Declaration, which demanded the unconditional surrender of the Japanese military at the end of World War II. Following the Hiroshima bombing on August 6, and the Soviet declaration of war and Nagasaki bombing on August 9, the Emperor's speech was broadcast at noon Japan Standard Time on August 15, 1945, and referred to the atomic bombs as a reason for the surrender.

The speech is the first known instance of a Japanese emperor speaking to the common people (albeit via a phonograph record). It was delivered in formal Classical Japanese, with much pronunciation unfamiliar to ordinary Japanese. The speech made no direct reference to a surrender of Japan, instead stating that the government had been instructed to accept the "joint declaration" (the Potsdam Declaration) of the United States, the United Kingdom, China, and the Soviet Union. This confused many listeners not familiar with the declaration about whether Japan had actually surrendered. Both the poor audio quality of the radio broadcast and the formal courtly language worsened the confusion.

== Background ==
Following the atomic bombing of Hiroshima and Nagasaki and the declaration of war by the Soviet Union on Japan, Emperor Hirohito met with the Supreme War Council in the early morning of 10 August 1945. Prime Minister Kantarō Suzuki asked Hirohito for an imperial command to break the deadlock for an unconditional surrender. Hirohito then stated softly that he did not believe that his nation could continue to fight a war and concluded that "the time has come when we must bear the unbearable. ... I swallow my own tears and give my sanction to the proposal to accept the Allied proclamation."

On the morning of 10 August, the Japanese Foreign Ministry transmitted a response to the Allies, offering to accept the terms with the understanding that it did not "comprise any demand which prejudices the prerogatives of His Majesty as a Sovereign Ruler", to which U.S. insisted that "the authority of the Emperor and the Japanese Government to rule the state shall be subject to the Supreme Commander of the Allied powers who will take such steps as he deems proper to effectuate the surrender terms." The Japanese offer of surrender and the Allied response were known only to high government officials. On the morning of 11 August, newspapers carried a statement in the name of General Korechika Anami and addressed to the army that "The only thing for us to do is fight doggedly to the end ... though it may mean chewing grass, eating dirt and sleeping in the field."

Marquis Kōichi Kido, Hirohito's closest advisor, later recorded in his diary that Allies leaflet dropping that carried the news of their diplomatic exchange had caused him to be "stricken with consternation" over the likely possibility of a military coup. At Kido's frantic urging, the emperor held another meeting, where he issued an imperial command that a rescript announcing the termination of the war be prepared as soon as possible. Hirohito knew that a publication of the rescript would not be enough to convince the military to surrender, thereby made the decision to directly address the nation by voice.

== Recording ==
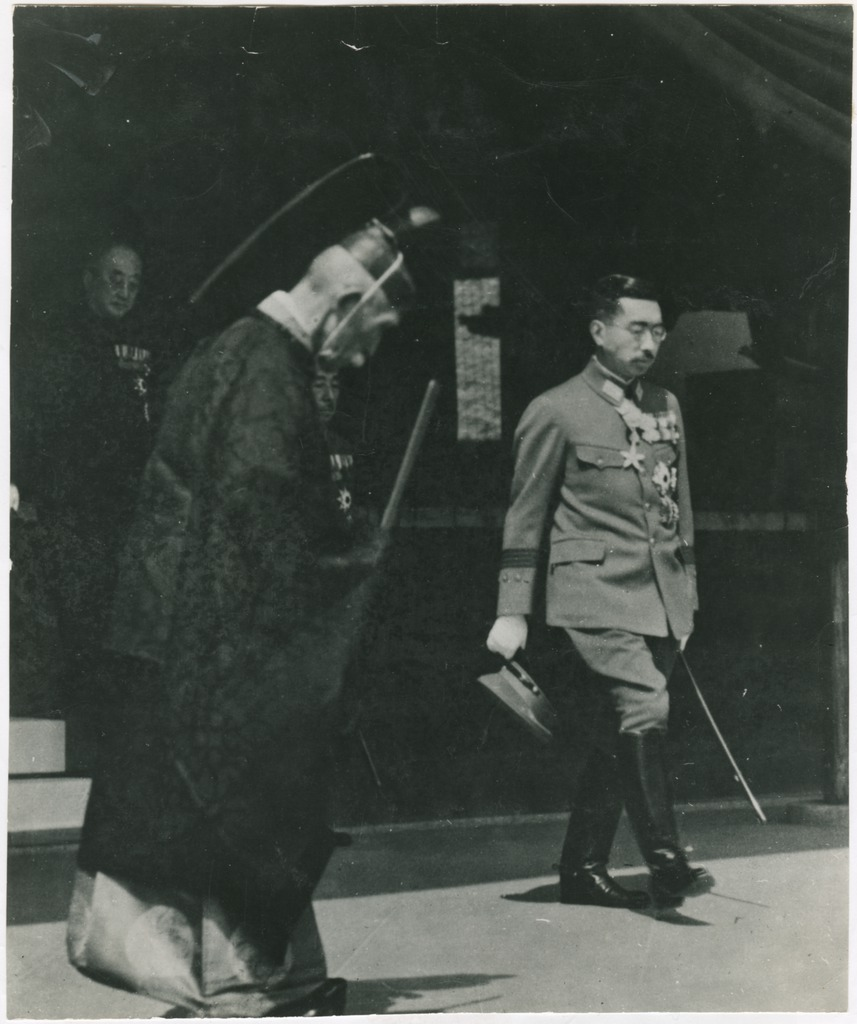
Hirohito (right) in 1945

The speech was not broadcast directly, but replayed from a pre-taped phonograph recording. On August 14, 1945, the Japan Broadcasting Corporation (NHK) dispatched sound technicians to the Tokyo Imperial Palace to record the broadcast. The NHK staff waited while cabinet members argued over the rescript’s wording. Around 8 p.m., a messy, heavily revised draft was finally handed to copyists, but even as they carefully transcribed it, more edits came in. Forced to make last-minute fixes, they awkwardly pasted small correction slips onto the document. Microphones were then set up in an office bunker under the Imperial Household Ministry, and Emperor Hirohito proceeded in between 11:25 p.m. and 11:30 p.m. During the first recording, he spoke too softly, and upon the advice of the technicians, offered to rerecord it. On the second attempt, his voice was considered too high-pitched, with occasional characters being skipped. Nevertheless, the second version was deemed the official one, with the first serving as a backup.

== Broadcast ==
Many elements of the Imperial Japanese Army refused to accept that Hirohito was going to end the war, believing it dishonourable. As many as 1,000 officers and army soldiers raided the Imperial Palace on the evening of August 14, 1945 to destroy the recording. The rebels were confused by the layout of the palace and unable to find the recordings, which had been placed in a safe in a small office used by a member of the empress's retinue and later hidden in a pile of documents. The two phonographs were labelled original and copy and successfully smuggled out of the palace, the original in a lacquer box and the copy in a lunch bag. In the early hours of 15 August, rebellious soldiers led by Major Kenji Hatanaka attempted to halt the broadcast at the NHK station, but was ordered to desist by the Eastern District Army. They had seized the building, detained the NHK staff and attempted to broadcast a message urging continued resistance. An officer even threatened announcer Morio Tateno at gunpoint in an attempt to take over the morning broadcast, but Tateno refused. The engineers were then forced to disable all radio transmission. With the coup suppressed, NHK engineers, holding out in the palace for the entire night safely transported recordings of the emperor's rescript to the station.

On the evening of August 14, 1945, all NHK stations announced that the Emperor would address the nation at noon on 15 August. At 7:21 a.m., Tateno formally announced that the rescript would be broadcast at noon, instructing the public to prepare to listen. Many people wore formal clothes for the occasion. Mimeographed copies of the emperor's text were relayed to newspapers, with a publication embargo until after the emperor's broadcast. At precisely noon on 15 August, an NHK announcer instructed the nation to stand for an announcement "of the highest importance." The national anthem, Kimigayo, was played, followed by the Emperor's speech. Reportedly, this was the first time that common Japanese had heard the voice of any Japanese Emperor and the first radio address by the Emperor.

To ease the anticipated confusion, after the conclusion of the speech, a radio announcer clarified that the Emperor's message had meant that Japan was surrendering. According to French journalist Robert Guillain, who then lived in Tokyo, upon the announcement's conclusion, most Japanese retreated to their homes or places of business for several hours to quietly absorb and contemplate the significance of the announcement. A digitally remastered version of the broadcast was released in June 2015.

== Content ==
The Gyokuon-hōsō, the radio broadcast in which Hirohito read the Imperial Rescript on the Termination of the War, August 15, 1945

Though the word "surrender" (Japanese: 降伏, romanized: kōfuku) was not explicitly used, Emperor Hirohito instructed Prime Minister Kantarō Suzuki and his cabinet to communicate to the Allies that the "Empire accepts the provisions of their joint declaration", which amounted to an acceptance of the Potsdam Declaration. He justified Japan's decision to go to war as an act of "self-preservation and the stabilization of East Asia" and referenced the setbacks and defeats of recent years, saying "the war situation has developed not necessarily to Japan's advantage". He mentioned the atomic bombings of Hiroshima and Nagasaki that had occurred days earlier, calling the atomic bomb a "new and most cruel bomb". The Emperor ended with a call on the Japanese people "to be devoted to construction for the future".

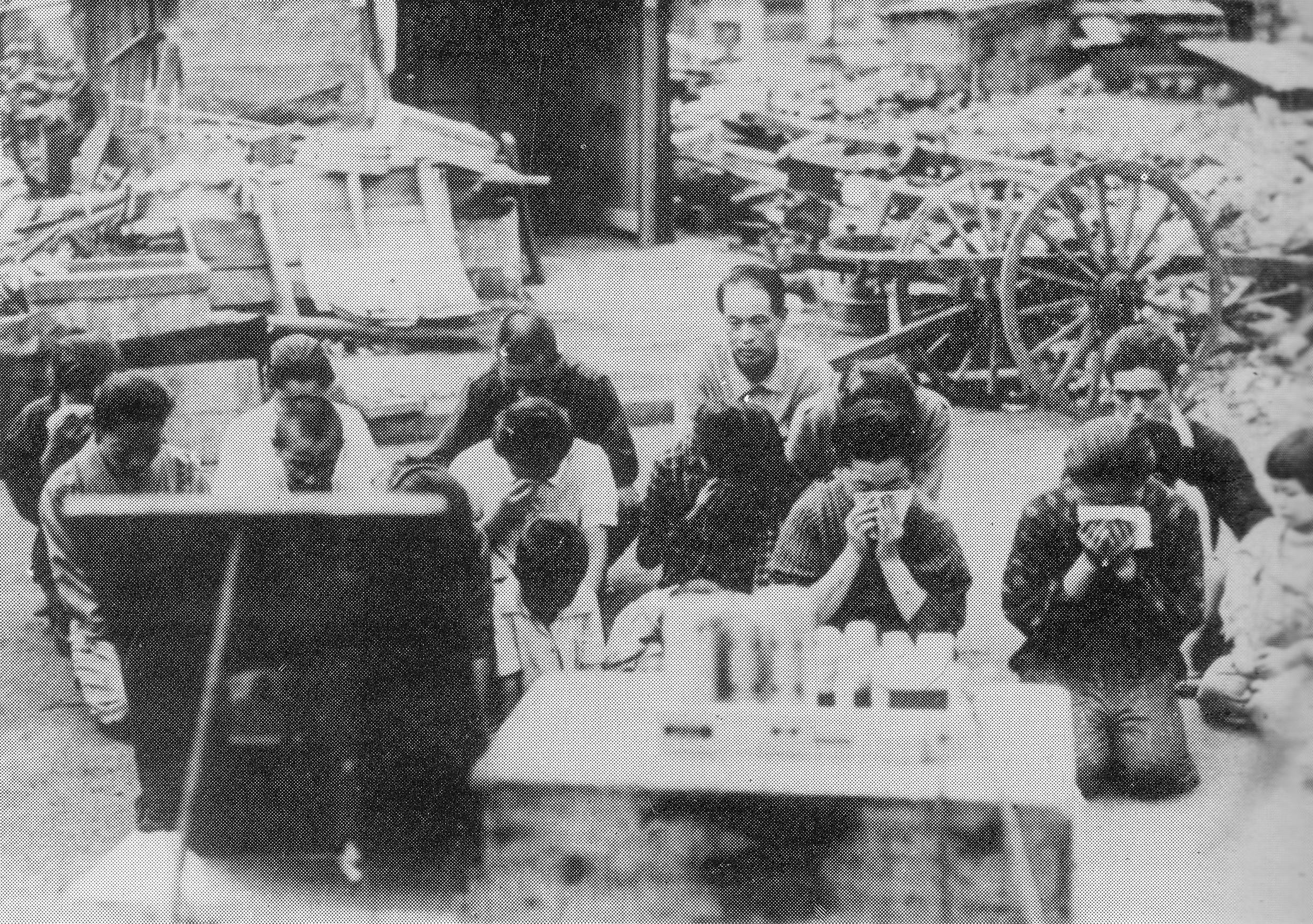
Japanese civilians listening to the surrender broadcast

The broadcast was translated into English and broadcast internationally by radio presenter Tadaichi Hirakawa at the same time. In the U.S., the Federal Communications Commission (FCC) recorded the broadcast, and its entire text appeared in The New York Times.

== Full text ==
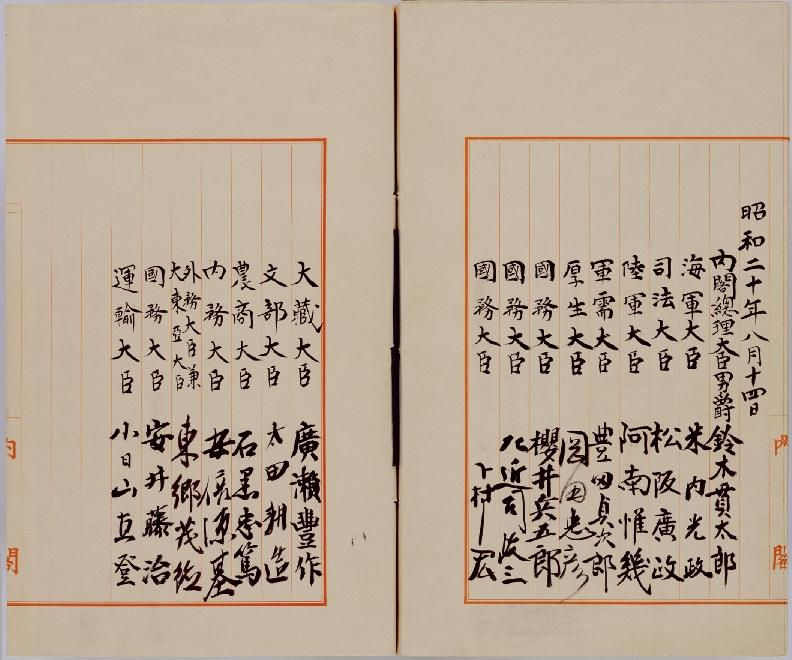
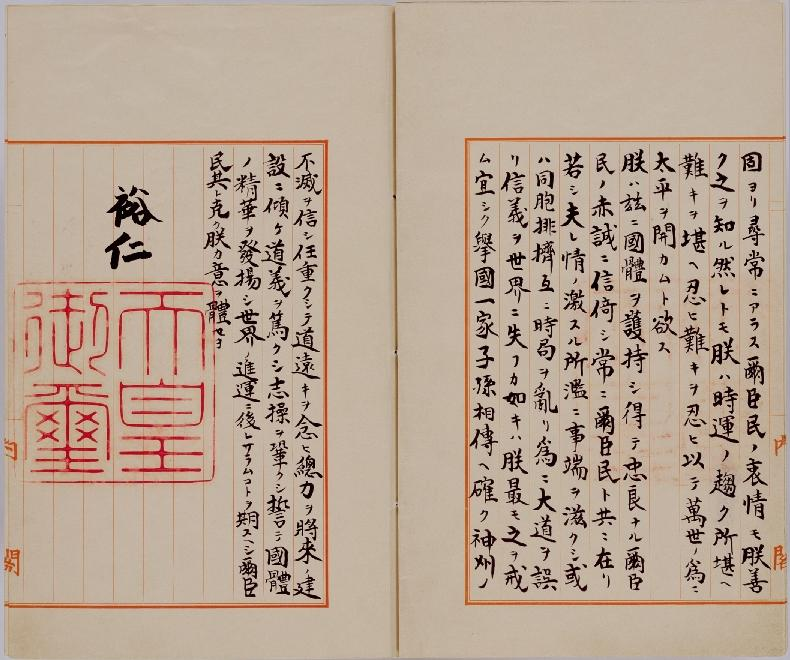
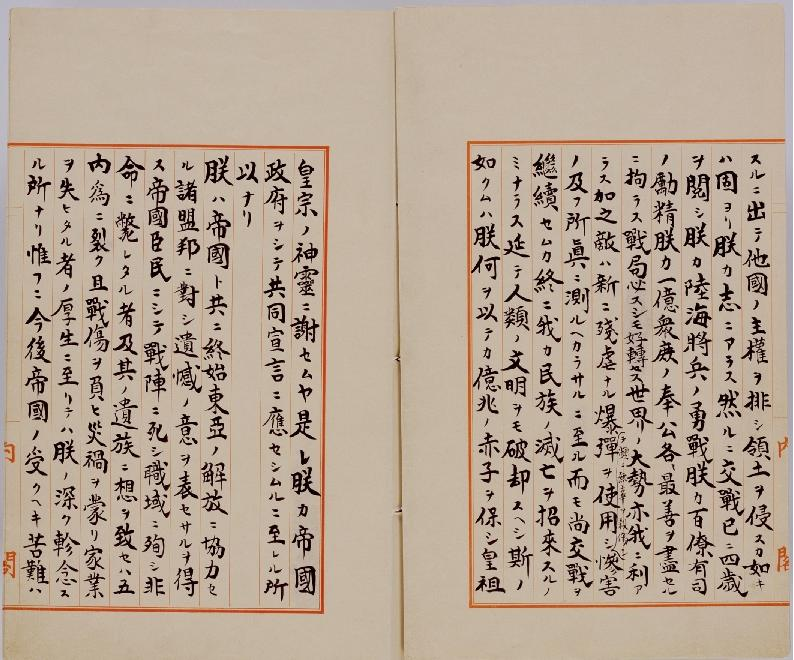
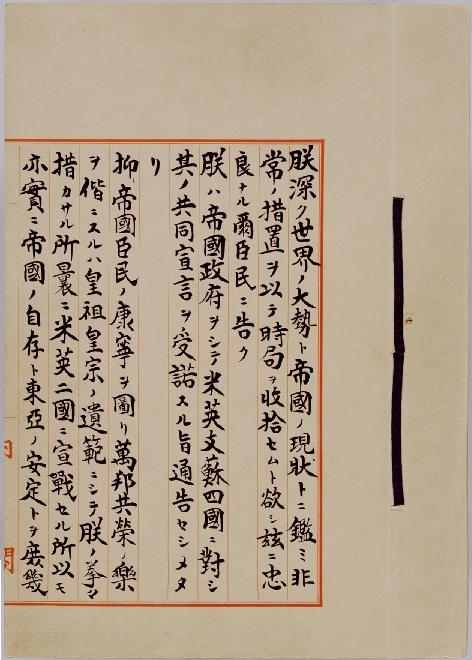
Original manuscript of the Imperial Rescript on the Termination of the War, written vertically in columns going from top to bottom and ordered from right to left, with the Privy Seal imprinted

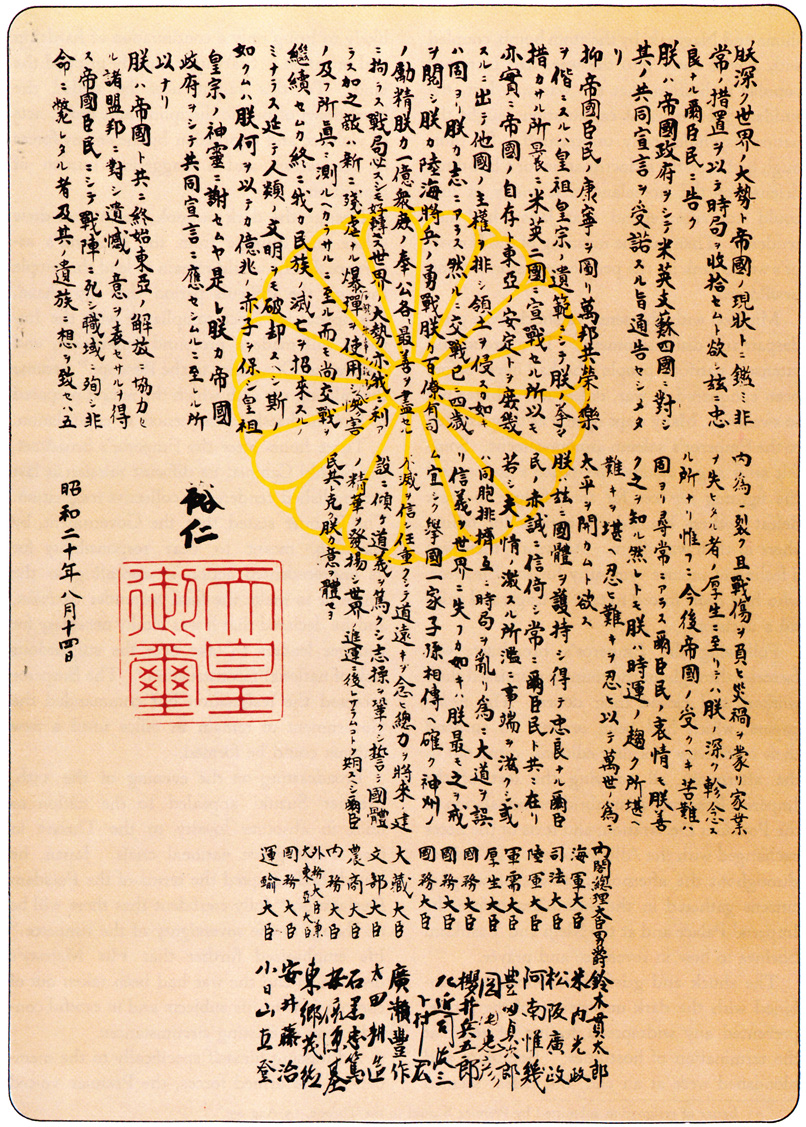
Single page print of the Rescript, again with the Privy Seal

=== Original text ===
朕󠄂深ク世界ノ大勢ト帝國ノ現狀トニ鑑ミ非常ノ措置ヲ以テ時局ヲ收拾セムト欲シ茲ニ忠良ナル爾臣民ニ吿ク
朕󠄂ハ帝國政府ヲシテ米英支蘇四國ニ對シ其ノ共同宣言ヲ受諾スル旨通󠄁吿セシメタリ
抑〻帝國臣民ノ康寧ヲ圖リ萬邦󠄂共榮ノ樂ヲ偕ニスルハ皇祖皇宗ノ遺󠄁範ニシテ朕󠄂ノ拳󠄁拳󠄁措カサル所󠄁
曩ニ米英二國ニ宣戰セル所󠄁以モ亦實ニ帝國ノ自存ト東亞ノ安定トヲ庻幾スルニ出テ他國ノ主󠄁權ヲ排シ領土ヲ侵󠄁スカ如キハ固ヨリ朕󠄂カ志ニアラス
然ルニ交󠄁戰已ニ四歲ヲ閱シ朕󠄂カ陸海將兵ノ勇󠄁戰朕󠄂カ百僚有司ノ勵精朕󠄂カ一億衆󠄁庻ノ奉公󠄁各〻最善ヲ盡セルニ拘ラス戰局必スシモ好轉セス
世界ノ大勢亦我ニ利アラス
加之敵ハ新ニ殘虐󠄁ナル爆彈ヲ使󠄁用シテ頻ニ無辜ヲ殺󠄀傷シ慘害󠄂ノ及󠄁フ所󠄁眞ニ測ルヘカラサルニ至ル
而モ尙交󠄁戰ヲ繼續セムカ終󠄁ニ我カ民族ノ滅亡󠄁ヲ招來スルノミナラス延󠄂テ人類ノ文󠄁明󠄁ヲモ破却スヘシ
斯ノ如クムハ朕󠄂何ヲ以テカ億兆ノ赤子ヲ保シ皇祖皇宗ノ神靈ニ謝セムヤ
是レ朕󠄂カ帝國政府ヲシテ共同宣言ニ應セシムルニ至レル所󠄁以ナリ
朕󠄂ハ帝國ト共ニ終󠄁始東亞ノ解放ニ協力セル諸盟󠄁邦󠄂ニ對シ遺󠄁憾ノ意󠄁ヲ表セサルヲ得ス
帝國臣民ニシテ戰陣ニ死シ職域ニ殉シ非命ニ斃レタル者及󠄁其ノ遺󠄁族ニ想ヲ𦤶セハ五內爲ニ裂ク
且戰傷ヲ負󠄂ヒ災禍ヲ蒙リ家業ヲ失ヒタル者ノ厚生ニ至リテハ朕󠄂ノ深ク軫念スル所󠄁ナリ
惟フニ今後帝國ノ受クヘキ苦難ハ固ヨリ尋󠄁常ニアラス
爾臣民ノ衷情󠄁モ朕󠄂善ク之ヲ知ル
然レトモ朕󠄂ハ時運󠄁ノ趨ク所󠄁堪ヘ難キヲ堪ヘ忍󠄁ヒ難キヲ忍󠄁ヒ以テ萬世ノ爲ニ太平󠄁ヲ開カムト欲ス
朕󠄂ハ茲ニ國體ヲ護持シ得テ忠良ナル爾臣民ノ赤誠󠄁ニ信倚シ常ニ爾臣民ト共ニ在リ
若シ夫レ情󠄁ノ激スル所󠄁濫ニ事端ヲ滋󠄁クシ或ハ同胞󠄁排擠互ニ時局ヲ亂リ爲ニ大道󠄁ヲ誤󠄁リ信義ヲ世界ニ失フカ如キハ朕󠄂最モ之ヲ戒ム
宜シク擧國一家子孫相傳ヘ確ク神州ノ不滅ヲ信シ任重クシテ道󠄁遠󠄁キヲ念ヒ總力ヲ將來ノ建󠄁設ニ傾ケ道󠄁義ヲ篤クシ志操ヲ鞏クシ誓テ國體ノ精華ヲ發揚シ世界ノ進󠄁運󠄁ニ後レサラムコトヲ期󠄁スヘシ
爾臣民其レ克ク朕󠄂カ意󠄁ヲ體セヨ

御名御璽
昭和二十年八月󠄁十四日
內閣總理大臣男爵󠄂鈴木貫太郞

Literally translated into English:

To you all our loyal and devoted subjects: Know ye, that We have considered deeply the current general trends of the world and the current situation of the Empire of Japan, and We have decided to take extraordinary measures to bring this current state of affairs to an end.

We therefore wish to inform you all that today, We have commanded the Imperial Government to communicate to the governments of the United States, Great Britain, China, and the Soviet Union that the Empire accepts the terms of their Joint Declaration.

To strive for the well-being of Our subjects and to share in the prosperity and happiness of all nations has been the solemn duty passed down from Our Imperial ancestors and the guiding principle that We have upheld. Indeed, Our decision to declare war on the United States and Britain was made with the sincere intention of ensuring the Empire’s self-preservation and the stability of East Asia. It was never Our desire to infringe upon the sovereignty of other nations or to expand our territory.

However, after four years of war, despite the valiant efforts of our land and naval forces, the diligence of our government officials, and the devoted service of our hundred million subjects, the war situation has not necessarily turned in Japan’s favor. Moreover, the general trends of the world have not been advantageous to us.

Furthermore, the enemy has begun to employ a new and cruel bomb, causing immense and indiscriminate destruction, the extent of which is beyond all estimation. Should we continue to fight, not only would it result in the ultimate collapse and obliteration of the Japanese nation, but it would also lead to the total extinction of human civilization.

How, then, are We to protect the millions of Our subjects and atone before the spirits of Our Imperial ancestors? This is why We have ordered the Empire to accept the terms of the Joint Declaration.

We cannot but express Our deepest regret to our allied nations who have consistently cooperated with the Empire in its efforts to liberate East Asia.

To Our loyal subjects who have fallen in battle, those who have devoted themselves to their duties, and the families who have suffered unbearable losses, Our heart is filled with much sorrow. Furthermore, We deeply sympathize with those who have been wounded in battle, suffered hardship, or lost their homes and livelihoods due to the current war.

The trials and suffering that the Empire must endure from now on will indeed be great. We fully understand the anguish of Our people. However, in accordance with the dictates of fate, We must bear the unbearable and endure the unendurable in order to pave the way for peace for all future generations.

By protecting and preserving the national polity, We trust in the sincerity and loyalty of Our subjects and will always remain with them.

However, should emotions run high and lead to rash actions, if fellow citizens turn against each other, disrupt the order of society, or tarnish the nation's honor by violating international trust, We would be profoundly saddened.

We urge you, Our subjects, to unite as one family, pass on our unshakable faith in the eternal destiny of our homeland to future generations, devote your efforts to rebuilding the nation, uphold moral integrity, strengthen your will, and strive to enhance the national character, ensuring that Japan does not fall behind in the progress of the wider world.

Understand well Our intentions, and act accordingly.

Sealed with the Imperial Signature and Privy Seal
Tokyo, August 14, 1945, on the 20th year of the Showa Era

Prime Minister of the Empire, Baron Kantarō Suzuki

=== Official English translation ===
TO OUR GOOD AND LOYAL SUBJECTS,

After pondering deeply the general trends of the world and the actual conditions obtaining in our empire today, we (Note: The pronoun used in Japanese was chin (朕), comparable to the royal we in English.) have decided to effect a settlement of the present situation by resorting to an extraordinary measure.

We have ordered our government to communicate to the governments of the United States, Great Britain, China and the Soviet Union that our empire accepts the provisions of their joint declaration.

To strive for the common prosperity and happiness of all nations as well as the security and well-being of our subjects is the solemn obligation which has been handed down by our imperial ancestors and which lies close to our heart.

Indeed, we declared war on America and Britain out of our sincere desire to ensure Japan's self-preservation and the stabilization of East Asia, it being far from our thought either to infringe upon the sovereignty of other nations or to embark upon territorial aggrandizement.

But now the war has lasted for nearly four years. Despite the best that has been done by everyone – the gallant fighting of the military and naval forces, the diligence and assiduity of our servants of the state, and the devoted service of our one hundred million people – the war situation has developed not necessarily to Japan's advantage, while the general trends of the world have all turned against her interest.

Moreover, the enemy has begun to employ a new and most cruel bomb, the power of which to do damage is, indeed, incalculable, taking the toll of many innocent lives. Should we continue to fight, not only would it result in an ultimate collapse and obliteration of the Japanese nation, but also it would lead to the total extinction of human civilization.

Such being the case, how are we to save the millions of our subjects, or to atone ourselves before the hallowed spirits of our imperial ancestors? This is the reason why we have ordered the acceptance of the provisions of the joint declaration of the powers.

We cannot but express the deepest sense of regret to our allied nations of East Asia, who have consistently cooperated with the Empire towards the emancipation of East Asia.

The thought of those officers and men as well as others who have fallen in the fields of battle, those who died at their posts of duty, or those who met with untimely death and all their bereaved families, pains our heart night and day.

The welfare of the wounded and the war-sufferers, and of those who have lost their homes and livelihood, are the objects of our profound solicitude.

The hardships and sufferings to which our nation is to be subjected hereafter will be certainly great. We are keenly aware of the inmost feelings of all of you, our subjects. However, it is according to the dictates of time and fate that We have resolved to pave the way for a grand peace for all the generations to come by enduring the unendurable and suffering what is insufferable.

Having been able to safeguard and maintain the Kokutai, We are always with you, our good and loyal subjects, relying upon your sincerity and integrity.

Beware most strictly of any outbursts of emotion which may engender needless complications, or any fraternal contention and strife which may create confusion, lead you astray and cause you to lose the confidence of the world.

Let the entire nation continue as one family from generation to generation, ever firm in its faith in the imperishability of its sacred land, and mindful of its heavy burden of responsibility, and of the long road before it.

Unite your total strength, to be devoted to construction for the future. And cultivate the ways of rectitude, foster nobility of spirit, and work with resolution – so that you all may enhance the innate glory of the imperial state and keep pace with the progress of the world.

Tokyo, August 14, 1945 (20th year of Shōwa)

— Prime Minister of the Empire of Japan TRH Kantarō Suzuki MHR

== Media releases ==
- Komori, Yōichi (August 2003). 天皇の玉音放送 [The Emperor's Voice Broadcast] (in Japanese). Tokyo, Japan: Gogatsu Shobō. ISBN 978-477270394-9. Book includes a CD.
- Kawakami, Kazuhisa (June 30, 2015). 昭和天皇 玉音放送 [Shōwa Emperor's Voice Broadcast] (in Japanese). Tokyo, Japan: Asa Shuppan. ISBN 978-486063799-6. Book includes a CD.

== See also ==
- Humanity Declaration – 1946 announcement by Japanese Emperor Hirohito
- German Instrument of Surrender – 1945 agreement ending WWII in Europe
- Surrender of Japan
