= Kyuichi Tokuda =

Japanese politician; first chairman of the Japanese Communist Party (1894-1953)

- 徳田 球一
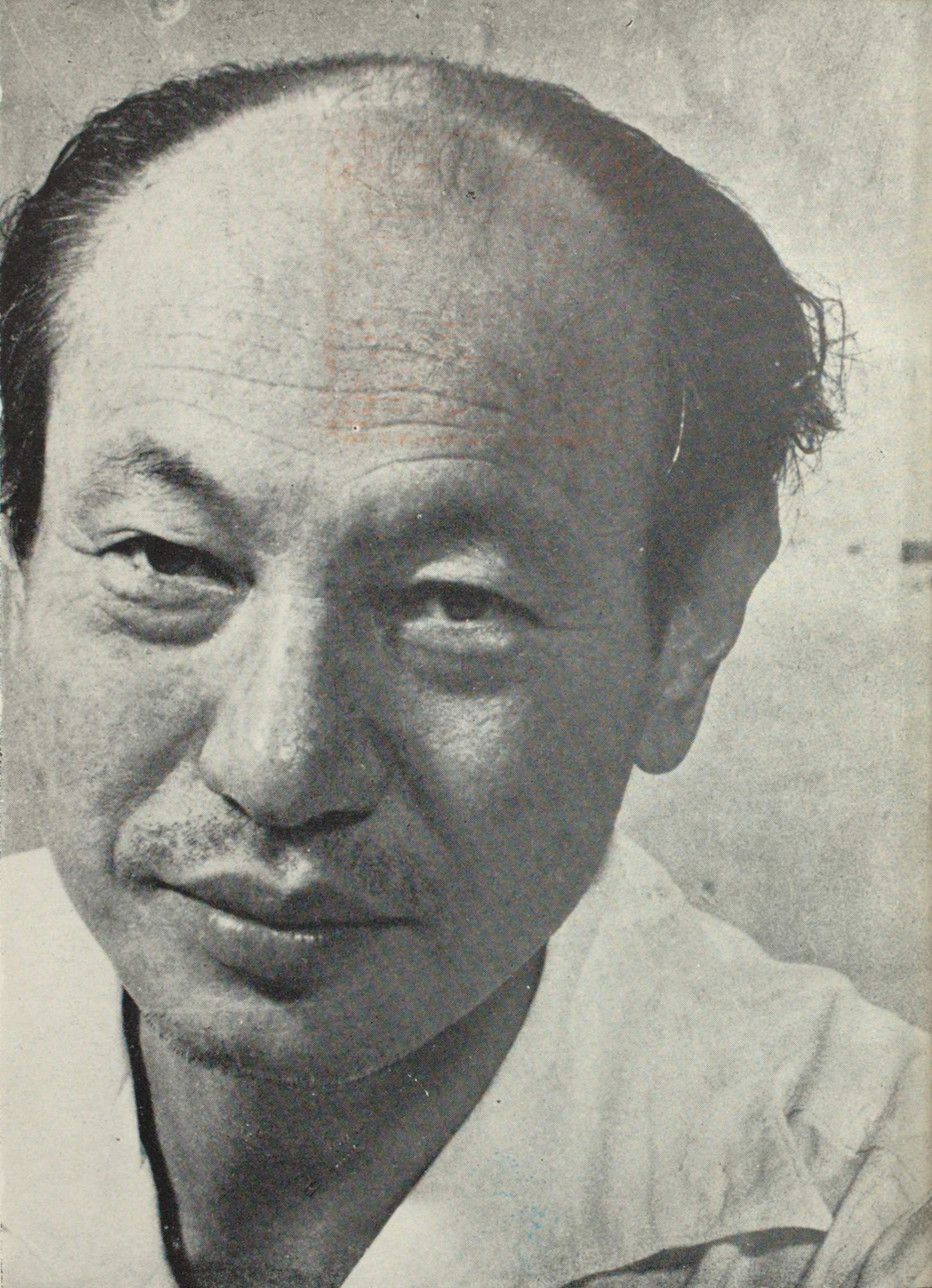
- Tokuda c. 1952

General Secretary of the Japanese Communist Party
- In office 3 December 1945 – 14 October 1953
- Preceded by: Sakai Toshihiko
- Succeeded by: Sanzō Nosaka

Member of the House of Representatives
- In office 4 April 1946 – 6 June 1950
- Preceded by: Constituency established
- Succeeded by: Jusō Miwa
- Constituency: Tokyo 2nd (1946–1947); Tokyo 3rd (1947–1950)

Personal details
- Born: 12 September 1894 Nago, Okinawa, Japan
- Died: 14 October 1953 (aged 59) Beijing, China
- Party: Communist
- Other political affiliations: Japan Socialist Alliance (1920); LFP (1926–1928)
- Relatives: Torio Yano (brother-in-law)
- Education: Nihon University
- Occupation: Lawyer

Kyuichi Tokuda (徳田 球一, Tokuda Kyūichi; September 12, 1894 – October 14, 1953) was a Japanese politician and first chairman of the Japanese Communist Party from 1945 until his death in 1953.

== Biography ==
Kyuichi Tokuda was born in Nago, a village on Okinawa Island, on 12 September 1894. Tokuda stated that his father was the son of a trader from Kagoshima who impregnated his mistress and that his mother had a similar background as well. He was given a copy of Kōtoku Shūsui's Essence of Socialism at age 16.

After receiving a higher education in Tokyo and Kagoshima, Tokuda returned to Okinawa in 1913, and worked as a substitute elementary school teacher. Returning to Tokyo in 1917, he entered Nihon University in 1918, and graduated with a law degree three years later. He was one of the founding members of the Japanese Communist Party in 1922, and later became a member of its Central Committee. The Labour-Farmer Party ran him as a candidate in the 1928 election.

Tokuda was briefly imprisoned in 1923 and 1926, for participation in subversive movements. He visited the Soviet Union in both 1925 and 1927. In March 1928 he was arrested under the suspicion of violating the Peace Preservation Law, and would go on to spend 18 years in prison. Serving time in Abashiri prison (1934-1940), Chiba (1940-1941), Toyotama (1941-1945), and Fuchu (1945). Tokuda was discovered and released from prison on October 10, 1945, by French Journalist Robert Guillain who at the time had visited the Fuchu Prison. While in prison, he occupied a cell adjacent to fellow Communist leader Yoshio Shiga. Upon his release, he was reportedly hoisted to the shoulders of a crowd of Communists and Koreans chanting anti-imperial messages.

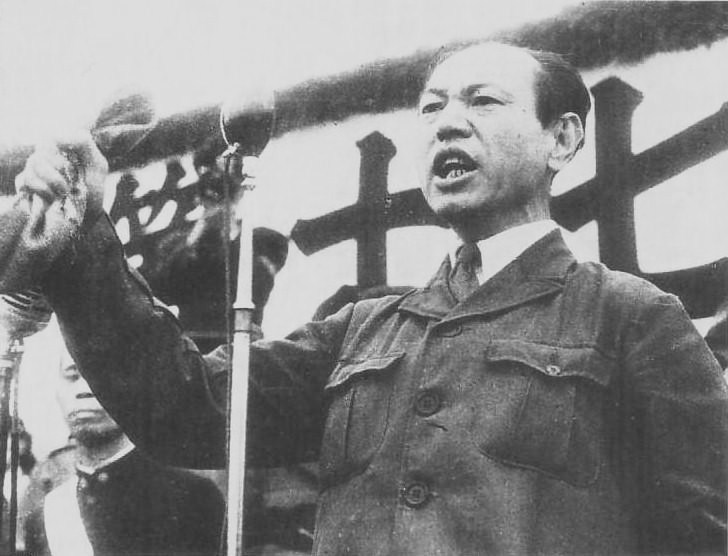
Tokuda giving a May Day speech in 1946

The JCP's Fourth Congress selected Tokuda to serve as Secretary General. After World War II, he was elected to the House of Representatives in the general election of 1946 along with his cousin, Sanzo Nosaka, who had returned from the Republic of China. In the same year he married his cousin Kosaku's widow, Tatsu Tokuda (formerly known as Kanehara). Tokuda was involved in the 1947 general strike and in 1948, he survived an assassination attempt by a dynamite-laden soda bottle thrown at his feet while he was giving a speech. By 1950, he was considered the second-in-command of the JCP and a key supporter of party leader Sanzo Nosaka; in the same year his party split internally following criticism by the Comiform. Along with other JCP leaders, he was purged from public office and politics under the Allied occupation. In October of the same year he defected to the PRC from the port of Osaka and organized the Peking Organization. Tokuda would continue to make decisions on the party's general policy from his exile. During his last years in China, he led a "mainstream" faction of the JCP and organized violent operations in Japan through the underground "Free Japan Radio". He died in Beijing and his death was not made public until 1955. A memorial service for Tokuda was held in Beijing on September 13 of the same year, which was attended by 30,000 people.

In the opening session of the 20th Party Congress of the Communist Party of the Soviet Union, on 14 February 1956, Nikita Khrushchev asked delegates to rise in honour of the Communist leaders who had died since the last congress - and named Kyuichi Tokuda, whose name was nearly unknown in the Soviet Union, on equal terms with the recently deceased Joseph Stalin. That was a clear and deliberate insult to Stalin, and it served as a preliminary to Khrushchev's speech later in the same conference in which he strongly denounced Stalin's "Cult of Personality".

== Works ==
- Eighteen Years in Prison (Gokuchu juhachi-nen) by Kyuichi Tokuda and Yoshio Shiga. Published by the Japanese Communist Party in 1948.
- Appeal to the People

== See also ==
- Japanese dissidence during the Shōwa period
- Mountain Village Operation Unit

== Works cited ==
- Swearingen, Rodger; Langer, Paul (1968). Red Flag In Japan: International Communism In Action 1919-1951. Greenwood Publishing Group. ISBN 0837168805.
