= Robert Gillan =

Scottish church minister (1787-1879)

Robert Gillan (1787–1879) was a Church of Scotland minister who served as Moderator of the General Assembly of the Church of Scotland in 1873.

== Biography ==
Gillan was born at Hawick, Roxburghshire. His father, the Rev. Robert Gillan, son of another minister of the same name, was appointed minister of Ettrick on 11 May 1787 and transferred to Hawick on 30 December 1789. He retired from the ministry of his church on 7 May 1800 and died at Edinburgh on 7 May 1824, aged 63, having married, on 4 April 1798, Marion, daughter of the Rev. William Campbell.

He was the author of "An Account of the Parish of Hawick" in Sir John Sinclair's Statistical Account of Scotland, 1791, vol. viii.; Abridgments of the Acts of the General Assemblies of the Church of Scotland, 1803, other editions in 1811 and 1821; View of Modern Astronomy, Geography, &c.; A Compendium of Ancient and Modern Geography, 1823; and he edited The Scottish Pulpit, a Collection of Sermons, 1823.

Robert Gillan, the third of that name, studied at the high school and university of Edinburgh, where he was early noted for his extensive scholarship and impressive oratory. On 7 July 1829 he was licensed to preach the gospel by the presbytery of Selkirk, and ordained minister to the congregation at Stamfordham, Northumberland, in October 1830.

He removed to the church at South Shields in October 1833, succeeding to Holytown, Lanarkshire, in 1837, where he continued to 1842. After being at Wishaw in the same county for six months, he accepted the parish of Abbotshall, Fife, on the secession of the non-intrusion ministers in May 1843, and from that place was brought to St. John's, Glasgow, on 25 February 1847. Here he remained during a long period, became very popular, and preached to large congregations. He took an active interest in all religious or social movements, and was an early opponent of the law of patronage. The University of Glasgow conferred on him the degree of D.D. in 1853. The incessant activity of the Glasgow charge at length told on his health, and on 10 January 1861 he accepted charge of the small church of Inchinnan, Renfrewshire. He was, however, still able to work, and being appointed one of the first two lecturers on pastoral theology, he prepared an admirable course of lectures, which were on two separate occasions delivered at the four Scottish universities. On 11 October 1870 he was publicly entertained in Glasgow, and presented with his portrait. He was devotedly attached to the established church of Scotland, and as moderator presided over the general assembly of 1873.

He died at the manse, Inchinnan, on 1 November 1879. His wife died on 23 January 1847. By her he had a son, the Rev. George Green Gillan, a chaplain in the Honourable East India Company's service.

== Publications ==
1. A General Fast Sermon, 1832.
2. The Intellectual and Spiritual Progress of the Christian in the Church of Scotland Pulpit, 1845, ii. 13–31.
3. Sermons at Glasgow, 1855.
4. The Decalogue, a Series of Discourses on the Ten Commandments, 1856.
