= Gilliam =

Gilliam may refer to:

== Places ==
- Gilliam County, Oregon, on the Columbia River Plateau
- Gilliam, Louisiana, a village
- Gilliam, Missouri, a city
- Gilliam, West Virginia, an unincorporated community

== Other uses ==
- Gilliam (surname)
- USS Gilliam (APA-57), a US Navy attack transport ship
- Gilliam II, a fictional computer system in the manga and anime series Outlaw Star
- Gilliam Candy Company
