= Dolores Gillen =

American actress

Dorlores Gillen (1914 or 1915 – December 8, 1947) was an American actress who worked primarily in radio. She made a specialty of portraying children.

== Early years ==
Born in Prairie du Rocher, Illinois, Gillen was the daughter of Dr. B. J. Gillen, a physician, and his wife, Mary. She had a sister and two brothers. She attended Webster College and graduated from the University of Illinois with an A. B. degree in dramatics. She also specialized in dramatics while graduating with a master's degree from the University of Kansas.

== Career ==
A successful audition at radio station WLS in Chicago led to Gillen's becoming a regular member of the cast for that station's Miniature Theater program in the fall of 1931. She developed a technique of imitating a crying baby by the way she used a folded handkerchief over her mouth. Gillen's career path changed in 1932 while she was portraying an ingenue on a serial on NBC radio. When a baby's cry was supposed to be heard on one episode, the sound-effects people could not find the appropriate recording. Gillen volunteered to supply the cry, and she did it so well that thereafter the director used her cries instead of the recording.

She portrayed a 9-month-old boy on Front Page Farrell, a 4-year-old girl on Stella Dallas, 2-year-old Sammy on When a Girl Marries, 5-year-old Barry on Joyce Jordan, Girl Interne, 18-month-old Jackie on Kate Hopkins, 5-year-old Peter Alden on Against the Storm, Alice Dudley on Northwestern Chronicle, the baby on Helpmate, one twin on Pepper Young's Family both twins in Abie's Irish Rose, and Skippy on Right to Happiness.

She was also heard on Mommie and the Men, The Romance of Helen Trent, Fish Tales, Princess Pat Players, Today's Children, The Play's the Thing, Dr. Christian, and Life Can Be Beautiful.

In one instance, Gillen's work brought disappointment to a film talent scout. After hearing an episode of CBS Workshop, he contacted the network to learn more about the small boy whom he had heard on the program. He lost interest when he was told that the voice he heard was that of Gillen, then age 22.

== Personal life and death ==
Gillen married attorney Vincent Paul Downey on June 15, 1940, in Chicago. Late in 1946 or early in 1947, Gillen decided to stop performing on radio because she was suffering from headaches. Brain specialists determined that a tumor was causing that pain, and they recommended surgery. She died on December 8, 1947, in New York Hospital after an operation.
