= Audrey Gillan =

British journalist and screenwriter

Audrey Gillan is a British journalist and screenwriter.

Gillan began reporting for The Guardian in 1998 after seven years with other news organisations.

== Newspapers ==
Gillan has worked for The Scotsman, The Herald, Scotland on Sunday, the Sunday Telegraph and The Guardian.

== 2003 invasion of Iraq ==
Gillan was embedded with the Household Cavalry in Iraq during the invasion phase of Operation Telic. Referring to a subsequent assignment, The Guardian described Gillan as having been "given unique access to the Territorial Army in southern Iraq". Gillan described her role in Iraq as that of "an independent witness, not working for the government."

== Radio ==
Gillan's six part Falling Tree production, Tara and George, aired on BBC Radio 4 in 2018. A follow-up, Beyond Tara and George, went out in February 2019.

Previous radio credits include the BBC Radio Scotland production Life is Sweeties, about her mother's life selling sweets, and Pioneers and Penguins, when she traveled to the Falkland Islands to mark the 30th anniversary of the 1982 war and recounted how oil, squid and penguins had made the islands rich.

In 2022 she produced and presented a BBC Scotland podcast, Bible John: Creation of a Serial Killer, about a series of notorious murders in Glasgow in 1969 and 1970.

== Education ==
Gillan read English and Politics at Strathclyde University.

== Pre-war reporting on bioterror and Iraq ==
On 15 October 2001, a letter addressed to United States Senator Tom Daschle was opened and found to contain anthrax spores. An article by Gillan dated 16 October stated that, "Iraq is known to have amassed enough weapons of mass destruction to enable them to wipe out the world's population." No source was provided for this statement, but Gillan made passing reference to The New York Times journalist Judith Miller, who had published extensively on biological weapons. On 17 October 2001 Miller and Stephen Engelberg published a high-profile article in The New York Times that used an unidentified source to suggest a possible link between the anthrax attacks and Iraq. That Iraq had large stockpiles of biological weapons had been widely known since attempts in 1998 to convince the Clinton Administration to go to attack Iraq.

=== Possible sources of anthrax terror ===
In addition to attempts to link the anthrax attacks to Iraq, efforts were being made by some to implicate both al-Qaida and another alleged Axis of evil member, North Korea. Gillan wrote, "Intelligence sources believe that Bin Laden operatives have been preparing for spectacular terrorist strikes using biological weapons for a number of years. It is believed that viruses causing deadly diseases such as ebola and salmonella were procured in Russia and that anthrax was obtained from North Korea." Again, the sources were not named.
