= E. Herbert Norman =

Canadian diplomat (1909–1957)

Egerton Herbert Norman
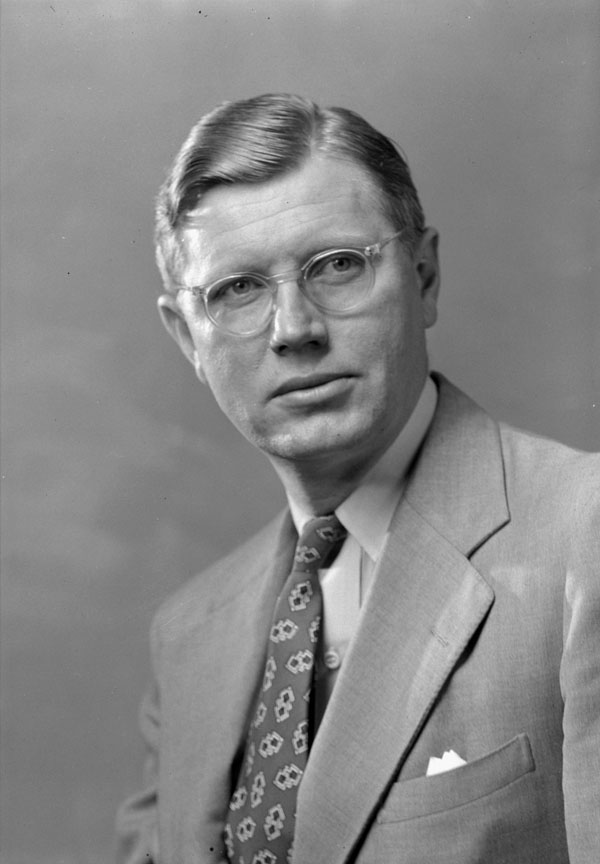
- Norman, c. 1950s
- Born: September 1, 1909; Nagano, Japan
- Died: April 4, 1957 (aged 47); Cairo, Egypt
- Occupations: Canadian diplomat, historian

Egerton Herbert Norman (September 1, 1909 – April 4, 1957) was a Canadian diplomat and historian. Born in Japan to missionary parents, he became a historian of modern Japan before joining the Canadian foreign service. His most influential book was Japan's Emergence as a Modern State (1940) where he argued that persisting feudal class relations were responsible for government oppression at home and the imperialistic expansion that led to World War II in Asia. During the Red Scare of the 1950s Norman was accused of being a communist or even a spy, though investigations found no corroboration and he was defended by Canadian authorities. He committed suicide in 1957.

== Early life and education ==
Born and raised in Karuizawa, Japan where his father, Daniel Norman, was a Canadian Methodist missionary in Nagano province. He studied at Victoria College at the University of Toronto. From 1933 to 1936, he studied at Trinity College, Cambridge. These were the years when socialist students often moved to the left to join the Communist Party, and Norman came under the tutelage of John Cornford, who soon went to Spain and was killed in the Spanish Civil War. However, while his politics were left-leaning, there is a controversy as to whether he became a Communist and, more importantly, whether he was a Soviet spy afterward, as were other Trinity students, such as Guy Burgess. Mark Perkins has concluded that Norman "became heavily involved in the socialist community and left wing student politics. There are numerous reports suggesting that he would spend his free time recruiting new students into the student socialist body.

In 1936, Norman entered the graduate program in Japanese history at Harvard University, where he studied under Serge Elisséeff, a Russian émigrée Japanologist. Norman joined the Canadian foreign service in 1939 and received his doctorate from Harvard in 1940.

His elder brother, Howard, who also became a missionary, worked in Canada during World War II to support Japanese who were placed in internment camps.

== Foreign service ==
His first post was with the Canadian Legation in Tokyo. Following the attack on Pearl Harbor in December 1941, Norman was interned by the Japanese authorities and he was not repatriated to Canada until mid-1942. He continued to work in the Department of External Affairs, heading the Special Intelligence Unit in Ottawa. This Unit prepared biweekly intelligence reports on Japan and the Far East, using mostly decoded messages from the Examination Unit as well as other sources.

During the Allied occupation of Japan after its defeat, Norman served as Canadian representative to the Supreme Commander of the Allied Powers (SCAP) administration and worked under the direction of Douglas MacArthur. He also became the first post-war President of the Asiatic Society of Japan. Using the close relationship he developed with MacArthur, he played a decisive role in the decision of the SCAP in 1946 to ban all Japanese political parties except the Japanese Communist Party (JCP). Alongside his diplomatic activities, Norman remained an active scholar and wrote a number of works on Japanese history, with a clear political leaning to the left. This contributed to the unproven accusation that he was a Communist sympathizer or even a Soviet agent.

== Controversy and suicide ==
Between 1950 and 1952, Norman was accused of being a Communist and possibly a Soviet agent. Allegations centred on his involvement with communist societies during his university years, and suspicion of decisions he helped make during the Japanese occupation. Karl August Wittfogel, in August 1951, named Norman as having been a member of a "communist study group" in 1939. Lester Pearson, Secretary of State for External Affairs, immediately told the Canadian press that "reports" of Norman's leftist tendencies had been fully investigated and had resulted in a "clean bill of health." The Senate subcommittee then summoned another ex-communist to testify, Elizabeth Bentley, who named Pearson himself. Norman then admitted under a harsher interrogation by the Royal Canadian Mounted Police that he had indeed been close to communists in his days in Cambridge, though he denied having been a member of the party.

Pearson, however, continued to have faith in Norman. Norman was made High Commissioner to New Zealand, both to placate American authorities and to isolate him from the stress and scrutiny of American intelligence. In 1955 Pearson offered him the ambassadorship to Egypt. Norman arrived on the eve of the Suez Crisis of late 1956, and played a key role as a neutral between the Egyptian leader Gamal Abdel Nasser and the western powers. As negotiations developed among the Americans, British, Israelis, and Egyptians, some in the American government feared that Nasser was becoming pro-Soviet and that Norman was abetting him. The Senate subcommittee raised Norman's name once again, using confidential files that had been given to them by the Canadian government.

In April 1957, Norman committed suicide by jumping off the roof of an eight-storey apartment building in which Brynolf Eng, the Swedish Minister in Cairo, occupied the top-floor apartment. Norman left three suicide notes asserting his innocence. John Howes suggested that Norman took his life because he was concerned that the repetition of the allegations against him could jeopardize negotiations in the aftermath of the Suez Crisis. The Canadian public at the time was horrified, and the incident caused harm to Canada-U.S. relations.

The circumstances surrounding Norman's death continue to provoke controversy. In 1990, Joe Clark, then Canadian Minister of External Affairs, commissioned Peyton Lyon to review all the Canadian government's files on Norman and "clarify his allegiance to Canada ... and any relationship he may have had with the Soviet Union." Lyon reported that Norman was not a spy; that he was a sympathiser with Communism and the Soviet Union before joining the public service in 1939; that he was never a member of the Communist Party of Canada; and that he did not lie, but had "understated" his degree of commitment to Marxism and his leftist activities. Lyon rejected the conclusions of a book by Professor James Barros, published in 1986, in which Barros had detailed Norman's links to Communist groups.

Norman is buried in the Protestant Cemetery in Rome.

Norman was one of the inspirations for Harry Raymond, the central character in Timothy Findley's play The Stillborn Lover (1993).

== Books by E.H. Norman ==
- Japan's Emergence as a Modern State: Political and Economic Problems of the Meiji Period, International Secretariat of the Institute of Pacific Relations, 1940
- Soldier and Peasant in Japan: The Origins of Conscription, International Secretariat of the Institute of Pacific Relations, 1943
- Ando Shoeki and the Anatomy of Japanese Feudalism, Asiatic Society of Japan, 1949
- Origins of the Modern Japanese State: Selected Writings of E.H. Norman, ed. John W. Dower, Random House, 1975
- Japan's Emergence as a Modern State: Political and Economic Problems of the Meiji Period, 60th Anniversary Edition, ed. Lawrence T. Woods, Vancouver: UBC Press, 2000

== References and further reading ==
- Akami, Tomoko (2002). Internationalizing the Pacific: The United States, Japan, and the Institute of Pacific Relations in War and Peace, 1919-45. London; New York: Routledge. ISBN 978-0415220347.
- Akita, George (1977). "An Examination of EH Norman's Scholarship". Journal of Japanese Studies. 3 (2): 375–419. doi:10.2307/132117. JSTOR 132117.
- Barros, James. No Sense of Evil: Espionage, the Case of Herbert Norman. Toronto: Deneau, 1986.
- Bix, Herbert P. (1978). "The Pitfalls of Scholastic Criticism: A Reply to Norman's Critics". Journal of Japanese Studies. 4 (2): 391–411. doi:10.2307/132031. JSTOR 132031.
- Bowen, Roger W., ed. (1984). E.H. Norman, His Life and Scholarship. Toronto; Buffalo: University of Toronto Press. ISBN 978-0802025050. Consists chiefly of edited papers from a conference held at St. Mary's University in Halifax, Nova Scotia, 18–20 October 1979.
- ——— (1986). Innocence is Not Enough : The Life and Death of Herbert Norman. Vancouver: Douglas & McIntyre. ISBN 978-0888944931.
- English, John (1992). The Worldly Years: The Life of Lester Pearson, Volume II: 1949-1972. Toronto: Vintage Books Canada. ISBN 978-0-307-37539-1.
- Evans, M. Stanton (2007). Blacklisted by History: The Untold Story of Senator Joe McCarthy and His Fight against America's Enemies. New York: Crown Forum. ISBN 9781400081059.
- Lyon, Peyton V. (1991). "The Loyalties of E. Herbert Norman". Labour/Le Travail. 28: 219–259. doi:10.2307/25143512. JSTOR 25143512.
- Maruyama Masao. Translated by Ronald Dore. "An Affection for the Lesser Names: An Appreciation of E. Herbert Norman (in Notes and Comment)." Pacific Affairs, September 1957, 249–53. Reprinted in Bowen (ed.) 1984, pp. 81–86.
- Knight, Amy. "How the Cold War Began." Chapter 9 "Death of a Diplomat." New York: Carroll & Graf, 2005.
- Price, John (2007). "Herbert Norman, the Occupation of Japan, and Canada-U.S. Relations. A Canadian Critique of MacArthur and the Occupation". Japan Focus. 5 (5).
