= Yoshio Shiga (communist) =

Japanese communist politician

- 志賀 義雄
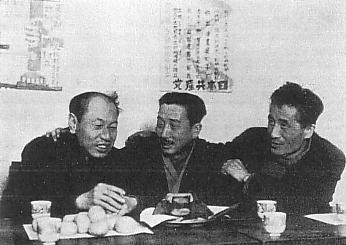
- Yoshio Shiga (right) with JCP members Kyuichi Tokuda (left) and Sanzō Nosaka (center), circa 1945-1946

Member of the House of Representatives
- In office 28 February 1955 – 27 December 1966
- Preceded by: Kiyohide Okano
- Succeeded by: Yasuyuki Okimoto
- Constituency: Osaka 1st
- In office 23 January 1949 – 6 June 1950
- Preceded by: Eizo Kawai
- Succeeded by: Watarō Kanno
- Constituency: Osaka 1st
- In office 11 April 1946 – 31 March 1947
- Preceded by: Constituency established
- Succeeded by: Constituency abolished
- Constituency: Osaka 1st

Personal details
- Born: 12 January 1901 Hagi, Yamaguchi, Japan
- Died: 6 March 1989 (aged 88)
- Party: Communist
- Education: Tokyo Imperial University

Yoshio Shiga (志賀 義雄, Shiga Yoshio; 12 January 1901 – 6 March 1989) was a member of the Japanese Communist Party.

== Biography ==
Yoshio Shiga was born in Hagi, Yamaguchi, on 1 January 1901. His father was one of the first steamship captains in Japan. He was highly interested in the French Revolution in high school and became engaged with socialism after the Rice riots of 1918. After entering a college-preparatory school in 1919, he started to read Marxist literature. He attended Tokyo Imperial University from 1922 to 1925.

After graduating from college Shiga joined Sanzō Nosaka's Industrial Labor Research Institute and enlisted into the army for one year. He was the editor of the magazine Marxism until his arrest in March 1928, remained in prison until 1945. The JCP selected Shiga to be editor-in-chief of the party's newspaper, Akahata.

Shiga served in the House of Representatives from May 1946 to April 1947, and February 1949 to 6 June 1950. During his tenure Shiga was in favour of the Partial Nuclear Test Ban Treaty. He was also the leader of those in the JCP who supported the treaty. Because of his support for the treaty, he and Ichizo Suzuki, another member of the JCP who supported the test ban, were expelled from the party. They later established a pro-Soviet Communist Party known as the Voice of Japan. Shiga died in 1989.

== Popular culture ==
Yoshio Shiga appears in the docu-drama "Nihon no Ichiban Nagai Natsu" (“Japan’s Longest Summer”). Shiga is played by Soichiro Tahara.

== Works ==
- Appeal to the People
- Eighteen Years in Prison (Gokuchu juhachi-nen) by Kyuichi Tokuda and Yoshio Shiga. Published by the Japanese Communist Party Party in 1948.

== See also ==
- Japanese dissidence during the Shōwa period

== Works cited ==
- Swearingen, Rodger; Langer, Paul (1968). Red Flag In Japan: International Communism In Action 1919-1951. Greenwood Publishing Group. ISBN 0837168805.
