= Robert Guillain =

French journalist

Robert Guillain (4 September 1908 – 29 December 1998) was a French journalist who spent most of his career in Asia at times of momentous events, such as the Pacific War. He wrote several books on Asia, especially Japan.

Guillain was considered by his colleagues and many readers as one of the most experienced and knowledgeable Western journalists in and on Asia, especially Japan and China, over the second half of the 20th century.

He spent most of his professional career in Asia as correspondent for the French news agency Agence Havas (since renamed Agence France-Presse) and then for the French daily Le Monde which he joined after the war, in 1947.

During his long presence in Asia, he witnessed and reported on some of the most dramatic and historic developments, from the Second Sino-Japanese War to World War II in Japan including the nuclear bombing of Japan at the end of the war, the decolonization conflicts and processes in India and Vietnam, the Chinese Civil War, the Korean War, the Indochina wars, China's Great Leap Forward and Cultural Revolution economic and political turmoils, and the rebirth and global expansion of the Japanese economy.

Since 1977, a Robert Guillain Reporters au Japon (Robert Guillain Reporters in Japan) Prize is awarded every year to selected journalists by the Association de Presse France-Japon (France-Japan Press Association).

== Foreign correspondent in Asia ==
As a young journalist, he was first assigned as foreign correspondent by the Agence Havas (currently Agence France-Presse) news agency to Shanghai in 1937, at the time of Japan's invasion of China. He was then transferred to Japan in 1938. After the Japanese bombing of Pearl Harbor, he could not return to France until the end of World War II. Guillain interviewed witnesses of the nuclear bomb at Hiroshima.

His book I Saw Tokyo Burning: An Eyewitness Narrative from Pearl Harbor to Hiroshima (originally published in 1947 in French as The Japanese people and the war - a witness account - 1939-1946), recounts his experience in Japan before, during and immediately after the Pacific War, including how war was perceived by the Japanese population, and how the Japanese Government and Military acted and communicated to try to guide national and international perceptions, and what were the initial impact of the Gyokuon-hōsō, in which the Japanese emperor Hirohito announced the surrender of Japan in August 1945.

== Works ==
- Le peuple japonais et la guerre. Choses vues 1939-1946, Paris : Ed. René Julliard, 1947 (later translated and re-published as I Saw Tokyo Burning: An Eyewitness Narrative from Pearl Harbor to Hiroshima).
- Dien-Bien-Phu: La fin des illusions - février-juillet 1954, Arléa-Éditions du Seuil, ISBN 978-2869596689
- Six cent millions de Chinois, Julliard, 1956 (translated in 1957 and re-published as The Blue Ants: 600 Million Chinese under the Red Flag).
- Dans trente ans la Chine, Seuil, 1965
- Japon, troisième grand, Seuil, 1969
- La Guerre au Japon, Stock, 1979
- L’espion qui sauva Moscou, Seuil, 1981
- I Saw Tokyo Burning: An Eyewitness Narrative from Pearl Harbor to Hiroshima, Jove Publications, 1982
- Orient Extrême, Une vie en Asie, Arléa-Le Seuil,(autobiography) 1986, ISBN 2-86959-000-8
- Les Geishas, Arléa, 1988
- Aventure Japon, Arléa-Le Seuil, 1998, ISBN 2-86959-373-2 ISBN 2-86959-617-0
