= List of unsolved murders in the United Kingdom (1980s) =

This is an incomplete list of unsolved murders in the United Kingdom that were committed between 1980 and 1989. The list excludes any murders in Northern Ireland related to The Troubles, or that are related to IRA bombings which occurred in England.

Victims believed to have been killed by the same perpetrator(s) are grouped together below.

== 1980 ==
| Year | Victim(s) | Location of body or bodies | Notes |
|---|---|---|---|
| January 1980 | Mohammed Arif | Attacked in Nelson, Lancashire, died in hospital | 18-year-old Arif was beaten with a stick in Southfield Street, Nelson, on 4 January 1980. Four people interrupted the attack and the assailant then began to move away from the scene, but he went back to strike Arif one more time before running off between some flats. No arrests have taken place over this killing. |
| January 1980 | Leonard McIntosh | Muswell Hill, London | 19-year-old McIntosh was knifed to death at a party in Muswell Hill on 12 January 1980. A man was charged with the musician's murder and the jury at the subsequent trial reached an impasse, but he was cleared at a retrial. This man would later be found guilty of the December 1984 murder of Anthony Smith (knifed to death at another party) and the October 1985 murder of PC Keith Blakelock (attacked in Tottenham by rioters using various weapons), but his conviction for Blakelock's murder was quashed in November 1991. |
| February 1980 | David Thomas | Liverpool | Thomas, a 24-year-old former boxer, was battered over the head with a metal instrument with sharpened edges after leaving a wine bar in Hardman Street, Liverpool, on Friday 1 February 1980 at about 10:30 p.m. His body was found a week later on derelict land off St Bride Street. |
| February 1980 | Tracy Main | Glasgow | Main, 13, was stabbed seven times in her home in a Gorbals tower block when she was off school due to illness on 5 February 1980. Both of her parents also lived there but were at work at the time. A neighbour of theirs – a man in his 40s but with a mental age of eight – was charged but acquitted after the court was made aware that he was not told while under arrest that he had a right to remain silent. |
| February 1980 | Elizabeth McCabe | Dundee | McCabe, a trainee nursery nurse aged 20, was strangled to death and dumped naked in Templeton Woods after parting company with a friend and leaving a nightclub on 11 February 1980. A former taxi driver was charged with murder in 2005 but found not guilty by a majority decision at the conclusion of his trial in 2007. A suspect in the initial murder inquiry, an apparent DNA link to him was later discovered, with the odds of the DNA belonging to someone unrelated to him being 1 in 40 million. Following the verdict, the police said they were not looking for anybody else, although after the rules on double jeopardy were changed in 2011, allowing the possible retrial of a previously acquitted suspect, the case was reviewed again. Similarities between the cases have led to speculation that McCabe's murder is linked to that of Carol Lannen in 1979. |
| February 1980 | Gertrude Gray | Bradford, West Yorkshire | 73-year-old Gray had been stabbed but was still semi-conscious when she was discovered mortally wounded at her residence on 23 February 1980. A man was charged with her murder in July 1996, but legal action against him was discontinued. |
| March 1980 | Doris Rendell | Ealing, London | Rendell, a 54-year-old homeless woman who had started squatting after being discharged from a psychiatric hospital, was found battered to death in a derelict house in Windsor Road, Ealing, on 7 March 1980. |
| April 1980 | Douglas Drake | Leeds | 64-year-old Drake died in hospital in early April 1980 as a result of suffering a brutal but weaponless nighttime assault in York Street, Leeds, on 29 December 1979. His assailant was described as a slim man aged 18 to 25 wearing a dark leather-type jacket and flared trousers. |
| April 1980 | Lillian Wright | Body not found | Wright disappeared from Lowestoft in Suffolk when she was 55, having last been seen in Lovewell Road. A frequenter of the town's bingo hall, it was believed that she left her home on 17 April to visit the then Hippodrome in Battery Green Road, but she did not enter the building that day. Police started treating Wright's disappearance as a no-body homicide in 2004. |
| May 1980 | Jessie Earl | Beachy Head, East Sussex | Earl disappeared from Eastbourne on 15 May 1980, aged 22, and her skeletal remains were found in 1989 in a thicket on nearby Beachy Head. British serial killer Peter Tobin became (and remains) an official suspect in Earl's murder, as he lived about 25 miles (40 km) along the coast from Beachy Head at the time she went missing. The killing is believed to be linked to the disappearance and suspected murder of Louise Kay, in whose case Tobin is also an official suspect. Kay disappeared from Eastbourne in 1988. |
| June 1980 | Patsy Morris | Hounslow Heath, London | 14-year-old Morris was choked to death with a ligature after she left her school during the lunch break. Serial killers Peter Tobin and Levi Bellfield – the latter of whom did not live very far from the victim when she was killed – have both been suspects in her murder even though Bellfield was only 12 at the time. Morris was Bellfield's childhood girlfriend and she was killed a year before his first conviction, for burglary, at age 13. Bellfield has reportedly boasted of killing Morris in prison and police said in 2008 that they would be investigating him for the murder after he allegedly confessed to an associate. |
| August 1980 | Jonathan Lewis | Arundel, West Sussex | 29-year-old Lewis, an antiques dealer, disappeared on 5 August 1980 and was found dead in the River Arun three days later. He had drowned after sustaining head injuries, apparently from a karate blow. Colin Wallace, whose close relationship with Lewis's wife was seen as a motive, was charged with murder in September 1980, convicted of manslaughter in 1981, and paroled in 1986. However, at the Appeal Court in 1996, two pathologists refuted an earlier pathologist's claim that Lewis had been knocked out with a karate blow, and the judges set the manslaughter conviction aside. One of the judges observed that the jury may have viewed the alleged karate blow as evidence of Wallace's culpability because of his SAS background. |
| August 1980 | Kevin Mison | Fulham, London | 18-year-old Mison had his hands tied behind his back, a gag in his mouth and superficial knife wounds on his neck when he was found dead in an empty house in Hartismere Road, Fulham, on 6 August 1980. The gag had caused him to die of suffocation, with an attempt to burn his body then following. Despite no evidence of sexual interference being discovered, the murder was nevertheless thought to have had a sexual motive. A suspect seen in Hartismere Road on the night of the crime was said to have spoken to people in the area who were never traced and never came forward. |
| August 1980 | John Greenwood and Gary Miller | Attacked in Whiston, Merseyside, died at Walton Hospital in Liverpool | Greenwood and Miller were 11 years old when a dog walker found them beaten and hidden under a mattress in a disused quarry in Whiston at 7:20 p.m. on 16 August 1980. They were found at a site which is now Stadt Moers Park, and died later in hospital from head injuries. A local man who knew the boys was acquitted despite revealing knowledge that apparently only the killer and police would have; he has remained the only official suspect ever since and police attempted to charge him again in 2019. This attempt failed, but a statement released on behalf of the Director of Public Prosecutions said: "…in the event that the ongoing police investigation yields sufficient compelling new evidence, he would reconsider his decision." |
| October 1980 | Jenny Ronaldson | Isle of Dogs, London | The body of Ronaldson, a 19-year-old student nurse, was found in the River Thames by a bargeman at the Isle of Dogs on 24 November 1980. She had been beaten, gagged and strangled, and police stated that they believed she had been sexually assaulted too and that the offender may be the type who would strike again. Ronaldson had disappeared a month earlier, having last been seen leaving Guy's Hospital in central London after saying she was going to the street market on Petticoat Lane. Her purse was subsequently discovered near a riverside pub a mile from the area. Theoretical links between Ronaldson's case and killers John Duffy and David Mulcahy were investigated in 2001. |
| November 1980 | Derek Grain | Bristol | 39-year-old Grain's head was hit repeatedly with a sand-filled traffic cone and kicked in the early hours of 1 November 1980. The assault took place in central Bristol, and his body was discovered close to Berkeley Square by a nurse walking to work. Police believed it was possible that there was more than one attacker and were sure that theft was the motive (money was missing from Grain's jacket pocket). |
| November 1980 | Ahmed Mustafa | Manchester | 30-year-old Mustafa was a Libyan studying at Manchester University. He disappeared on 26 November 1980 and was found murdered three days later in a vacated flat never owned or rented by him, and the killing (in which he was stabbed repeatedly) was suspected to have been ordered for political reasons. |
| November 1980 | John Welch | Newcastle | The 45-year-old catering manager was beaten to death in room 101 of the Swallow Hotel in Newcastle on 26 November 1980. Two men were charged in 1990, but the Crown Prosecution Service decided against putting either of them on trial. |
| December 1980 | Jovan Wong | Bromley, London | Wong's body was found on 17 December 1980 in a storeroom above the Bromley High Street jeans shop managed by him. The body had a cut throat and stab wounds, and money had been stolen from the till, too. A teenage former employee was acquitted of Wong's murder in September 1981, but as an adult, he was found guilty in April 1998 of killing his wife by setting fire to their holiday cottage the previous April in an offence said to have been motivated by monetary gain. |
| December 1980 | Eric Carver | Nottingham | 66-year-old Carver was bludgeoned to death while he was asleep at his home in Lenton, Nottingham, about four days before Christmas 1980. A man jailed for murder in 1982 had his conviction quashed in 2006 because appeal judges ruled that lack of evidence against him together with questionable tactics used by police to get him to confess meant that his conviction was not safe. |

== 1981 ==
| Year | Victim(s) | Location of body or bodies | Notes |
|---|---|---|---|
| February 1981 | Henry Carr | West Brompton, London | The 51-year-old former British spy had been stabbed and mutilated with a knife when his body was found at his flat in Cathcart Road on 28 February 1981. A number of sex workers were quizzed over his death. |
| April 1981 | Caroline Harris-Reed | Stockwell, London | Student teacher Harris-Reed was murdered in the flat she was sharing with a 22-year-old nurse. Police issued an artist's impression of the perpetrator, who forced his way into the property before holding the two young women at knifepoint and stabbing Harris-Reed (who was also 22) to death. |
| May 1981 | Anthony Donnelly | Hackney, London | 22-year-old Donnelly was stabbed to death in Glyn Road, Hackney, in the early hours of 8 May 1981. Four black youths were convicted over the attack, despite a witness statement suggesting that each of the assailants was white. (The statement also suggested that Donnelly was targeted by them for mixing with black people.) One of the four youths was convicted of murder, the other three of perverting the course of justice, but appeals resulted in the overturning of all the verdicts in March 1982. |
| May 1981 | James Adams | Bradford, West Yorkshire | 46-year-old Adams received 22 knife wounds in public toilets in Manningham, Bradford, after stopping to use them on his way home from work on 26 May 1981. A trail of the bespectacled killer's own blood was present and went on for about a mile from where he had committed the offence. |
| June 1981 | Dorothy Park | New Pitsligo, Aberdeenshire | 63-year-old Park, a village postmistress, suffocated to death in her flat above the post office in New Pitsligo after being bound and gagged within 15 hours of a neighbour seeing her at about 5:00 p.m. on 17 June 1981. £79 was stolen, but a bank bag containing £4,500 in takings was left untouched. |
| July 1981 | Parveen, Kamran, Aqsa and Imran Khan | Walthamstow, London | Pregnant Parveen Khan, 31, and her children Kamran, 11, Aqsa, 10, and Imran, two, died in an arson attack believed to have had a racist motive. Petrol was squirted through the letterbox and lit during the early hours of 2 July 1981 at their home in Belgrave Road, Walthamstow. |
| July 1981 | Vishal Mehrotra | Rogate, West Sussex | Eight-year-old Mehrotra was last seen by his family on 29 July 1981 in a crowded street near his home in Putney, southwest London. His remains were found fifty miles away at Durleigh Marsh Farm, Rogate, in February 1982. Mehrotra's father said he was called by a man who told him that his son's disappearance was connected to a paedophile ring whose members frequented Elm House guesthouse in Barnes. Police have investigated possible links to notorious paedophile Sidney Cooke and his infamous "Dirty Dozen" paedophile ring. |
| August 1981 | Nude in the Nettles | North Yorkshire | A woman's naked and decomposed body was found dumped in bushes next to a country road near Sutton Bank on 28 August 1981 after police received an anonymous tip-off from a "well-spoken man" who refused to give his name for "national security reasons". |
| September 1981 | Kenneth Jewell | Luton, Bedfordshire | 33-year-old Jewell was found dead with head injuries on a dimly lit pathway near High Town Road, Luton, on 19 September 1981. Police thought he might have been robbed or got into a fight. |
| September 1981 | Jill Matthews | Steyning, West Sussex | 37-year-old Matthews, a homeless woman with schizophrenia, was sexually assaulted and strangled. She went missing on 28 September 1981 and her body was found in woodland not far from Steyning on 14 November. |
| October 1981 | Unnamed baby girl | Weymouth, Dorset | A baby's body was discovered washed up on the beach near to Weymouth Pier's bandstand on 15 October 1981. The baby had been strangled and her body was within a Jersey wine merchant's carrier bag. It is believed that the baby was on a ferry either leaving or entering the port at Weymouth and was thrown from it. Neither the mother nor the father has been found. |
| October 1981 | John McLean | Aberdeen | 51-year-old McLean had been living rough when his battered body was found one morning on wasteland next to a lorry park close to where he had been seen at around 12:20 a.m. that day (24 October 1981). Personal possessions of his were found stuffed down a nearby drain, and this discovery added weight to the theory that the unemployed labourer had been killed by a mugger. |
| November 1981 | Pamela Hastie | Johnstone, Renfrewshire | Hastie, 16, went missing on her way home from school in November 1981. Her body was found in Rannoch Woods, close to her home. A teenager confessed to Hastie's murder and was jailed, but he maintained that he was coerced into confessing. In 2007, the verdict of his trial was ruled unsafe and he was released after spending twenty years in prison. It has been suggested that Hastie could have been a victim of Peter Tobin or Robert Black, both of whom were serial killers. Fifteen months after Hastie's murder, 11-year-old Tracey Waters was murdered in the same town. |
| November 1981 | Sidney Hickling, Susan Ovens and Dolphus Smith | Rushden, Northamptonshire | Hickling, 27, his common-law wife Ovens, 24, and their friend Smith, 55, were travellers who were tortured and then shot through the head in their caravans on Ditchford Lane, a road close to the outskirts of Rushden. Their bodies were found on the morning of 24 November 1981. |

== 1982 ==
| Year | Victim(s) | Location of body or bodies | Notes |
|---|---|---|---|
| January 1982 | Ralph McIntosh | Gullane, East Lothian | Widower McIntosh, 71, was battered to death in his house in Gullane on 25 or 26 January. Very little evidence of theft from the property and nothing suggestive of a break-in there would be discovered. |
| February 1982 | Ali Asghar | Nelson, Lancashire | 27-year-old Asghar was kicked to death and robbed when a group of up to four males approached him and a companion in Colbran Street, Nelson, on 10 February 1982. |
| February 1982 | Sarah Hill | Lees, Greater Manchester | 86-year-old Hill was murdered by an intruder in her house on Thomas Street, Lees, on 12 February 1982. She had lived in the area all her life and worked in nearby cotton mills. Hill was 4 feet 10 inches (1.47 m) tall and frail at the time of her death, relying on neighbours to run errands for her. The intruder beat her about the head and opened some drawers, but police were unable to establish if anything was missing. |
| February 1982 | Elaine Wakefield | Axe Edge, near Buxton, Derbyshire | 20-year-old Wakefield was last seen after leaving the home which she shared with her police officer boyfriend in Buxton on 25 February 1982. Her partially clothed body was found six miles from Buxton two days later close to High Edge Raceway at Axe Edge. She had died from compression to the neck. |
| April 1982 | Julie Keshmiri | Leeds | 27-year-old Keshmiri died after an arson attack on her home on 10 April 1982. |
| May 1982 | Ann Lee and Margaret Johnson | Aldershot, Hampshire | 44-year-old Lee and 66-year-old Johnson were stabbed to death as they exercised their dogs on Aldershot Common on 10 May 1982. A man told police he was behind the double murder and spent 17 years in prison, but appeal judges cleared him after statements concerning police pressure and his history of being a fantasist were heard. The man was additionally described as having "compliant" character traits. |
| June 1982 | Jean Brook | Bedgebury Forest, Kent | Brook, a 46-year-old mother-of-three and delivery driver from Hastings in East Sussex, was battered to death and left in Bedgebury Forest on 10 June 1982. Police have not linked her murder to that of an unidentified woman whose beaten body was found in the same forest in October 1979. |
| June 1982 | Roberto Calvi | Blackfriars Bridge, London | The 62-year-old Italian banker and chairman of Banco Ambrosiano, which collapsed in one of modern Italy's biggest political scandals, was found hanging from scaffolding under Blackfriars Bridge on 18 June 1982. His death was ruled as murder after two coroners' inquests and an independent investigation. Five people were acquitted of Calvi's murder when a trial in Rome ended in June 2007. A book by David Yallop titled In God's Name relates this crime and the 'suiciding' of Calvi's secretary to corruption and possibly the death of Pope John Paul I: Albino Luciani. |
| June 1982 | Nicky Gerard | West Ham, London | Gerard, 32, a former bouncer cleared along with Ronnie Knight of the 1974 gangland murder of Alfredo Zomparelli (which a third defendant was found guilty of), was killed in Mitre Road, West Ham, on 25 June 1982 by two men in balaclavas. He was shot in his car, then clubbed (probably with a shotgun) after getting out of the vehicle before the final round was fired into him at point-blank range. In another case that remains unsolved, a man cleared of Gerard's murder – Tommy Hole – was himself shot dead in London in December 1999. Hole was cleared after a key prosecution witness said he could not unreservedly place him at the scene of the Gerard killing. |
| July 1982 | Dora Pratt | Ipswich, Suffolk | The 76-year-old shopkeeper was struck on the head three times at her premises on Bulstrode Road in Ipswich on 9 January 1982, but did not succumb to her injuries until 6 July. Items having been stolen from the shop at around the time the attack took place suggests theft was the motive for it. |
| July 1982 | Terivia/Tervina Cameron | Sheffield | 59-year-old Cameron was found dead at her flat in Addy Close, Sheffield, after a fire at the property on 8 July 1982. A post-mortem revealed that she had died of strangulation. |
| July 1982 | Keith Church | Attacked in Hoddesdon, Hertfordshire, died in hospital | The 27-year-old artist was knifed on 9 July 1982 while cycling near his home. He died in hospital shortly afterwards and told police before doing so that the attacker, who struck outside Hoddesdon police station, demanded money and was driving a red car. |
| July 1982 | Eileen Scally | Stoke-on-Trent, Staffordshire | On 25 July 1982, 32-year-old Scally waved goodbye to her husband and daughters as they left the family home before going upstairs to her bedroom, where she was strangled whilst taking an afternoon nap. The house was ransacked too and over £200 in cash stolen. Someone was charged with Scally's murder but acquitted at court. |
| August 1982 | Flora McVeigh | Pimlico, London | Prostitute McVeigh, 57, was found dead from compression to the neck in a hotel room on 8 August 1982. The hotel employee who found her told a coroner the following December that a woman with a Scottish accent rang the establishment in September and gave him the name of a man she alleged was the killer. |
| August 1982 | Edmund Simpson | Manchester | 58-year-old Simpson's head was hit repeatedly with a blunt object at his workplace (a bookshop near Manchester Cathedral) and £65 stolen from the premises on 9 August 1982. He died from his injuries on 11 August. An agitated-looking man was seen running away from the area of Simpson's place of work at about the time he was attacked there. |
| August 1982 | Gurcharn Singh Landa (known as "John") | Mapperley, Nottingham | Landa, a 33-year-old father-of-eight, drove his taxi to Peel Street in Nottingham at about 4:00 a.m. on Saturday 14 August to pick up a man who had rung from a telephone box and called himself "Shelton". At 4:05 a.m. a woman living on Cyprus Road – about a mile away from Peel Street – heard a vehicle brake suddenly and, looking out of the window, saw the taxi rocking violently, as though a fight was taking place inside. She called the police and then went to help, but Landa, who had received 87 stab wounds (mostly to the chest) and been robbed of his takings, died not long after their arrival. Eleven people were arrested or interviewed under caution over his murder, but no one was charged. |
| August 1982 | Bernard Warren | Watford, Hertfordshire | 53-year-old Warren's death around 18 August 1982 followed a robbery involving the theft of the Watford resident's wristwatch. An incident on 3 September was suspected to be connected, and in the second incident, a man close in age to Warren was attacked and had £2 stolen. |
| September 1982 | Malcolm Bolt | Bristol | Bolt, 42, had been hit on the head with a blunt weapon when he was reported as having been found in his office on Alma Road, Clifton, on 21 September 1982. He had been living in fear due to enemies he had made through his business relationships, prompting him to start locking and bolting himself into the office where the attack was to occur. A man who prosecutors alleged had fallen out with Bolt over a gold deal the two of them had been planning was acquitted of murder after two trials. |
| November 1982 | Andrew Stevens | Leicester | Ratby man Stevens, 20, was attacked outside a nightclub in Leicester city centre on 31 October 1982. Police believed that the two perpetrators may have been football fans. Stevens was treated at the Leicester Royal Infirmary that night for cuts to his face and then discharged, but he died there several days later after being readmitted because he had fallen unconscious. |
| November 1982 | Patrick O'Nione | Bermondsey, London | 52-year-old O'Nione was shot five times in the head on 30 November 1982 as he walked to his car in Tower Bridge Road, Bermondsey, following a visit to his daughter's nearby wine bar. The murder was believed to have been gang-related. A man arrested over the offence in March 1993 was placed in a chokehold and collapsed after lunging at a police officer, and died in hospital before any charges could be laid. O'Nione had been acquitted at a pre-committal hearing of murdering 39-year-old Peter Hennessey at a hotel in London in December 1979. |
| December 1982 | Esme Hoad | Tonbridge, Kent | 85-year-old Hoad was hit over the head with a blunt object and stabbed in the chest in the hallway of her home on Havelock Road, Tonbridge. Photofits were released of a man and a woman who had been seen paying visits to the house. |

== 1983 ==
| Year | Victim(s) | Location of body or bodies | Notes |
|---|---|---|---|
| January 1983 | George Harding | Birmingham | The body of 75-year-old Harding, a retired postal worker and widower, was discovered in his home on Lily Road, Yardley, Birmingham. He had been hit on the back of the head, tied up, and suffocated, and his wallet, containing £50–£100, was missing. |
| February 1983 | Tracey Waters | Johnstone, Renfrewshire | 11-year-old Waters went missing on the evening of 14 February 1983 after leaving her house to visit a local youth club. Her body was found under a hedge in Shanks Crescent about half a mile from her home; she had been beaten and strangled. Waters' uncle was charged with her murder, but the charge was dropped. He vanished from his home in 2001 to escape vigilante attacks and police believe he may have committed suicide. |
| March 1983 | Wati Suri | Birmingham | 67-year-old Suri was beaten and strangled with a ligature by a burglar or burglars on 8 March 1983 at the house in Edgbaston where she lived with her son and daughter-in-law. Four youths were convicted of her murder in 1984, but the convictions of three of them were overturned in 1985 and the fourth had his overturned in 1994. |
| April 1983 | Mary "Molly" Willmore | Taplow, Buckinghamshire | 74-year-old Willmore's house in Boundary Road, Taplow, was set on fire in the early hours of 2 April 1983. Her body was discovered in the kitchen and had severe head injuries. Willmore's lifestyle was described as "eccentric": she lived alone with 15 cats in just a few rooms of the dilapidated building. Police believed the attack was due to a burglary going wrong. |
| April 1983 | Sheila Anderson | Edinburgh | 27-year-old Anderson was last seen outside Lindean House on Commercial Street in Edinburgh at 11:25 p.m. on 7 April 1983. Her body was found half an hour later on a track at Gypsy Brae, off West Shore Road in Granton. She had been repeatedly run over by a car. Her shoes and handbag were found a week later in a car park in East Lothian. Anderson had been a sex worker and had developed a drug habit after the death of her mother. Police obtained a DNA profile in 2009 which has not yet been matched to anyone. |
| May 1983 | Andrea Troupe | Peckham, London | 16-year-old Troupe was stabbed repeatedly in the neck and heart in Warwick Gardens, Peckham, on the night of 2–3 May 1983. It was not known how the pregnant schoolgirl had come to be in that park, which was approximately a mile from her home. A man convicted of two other murders reportedly admitted to this one to a fellow prisoner but was not interviewed by the police about it. |
| June 1983 | Gary Hutchings | Islington, London | 23-year-old Hutchings was shot dead near his flat in Camden Walk, Islington, on 4 June 1983. Police inquiries found that the killing had followed an argument he had been involved in at a public house. |
| June 1983 | Olive Wilkinson | Cleethorpes, Lincolnshire | Wilkinson was found clubbed to death in the living room of her home in Montague Street, Cleethorpes, on 10 June 1983. As her handbag was missing too, it seemed that theft could have been the motive for the slaying of the 38-year-old mother-of-five. A 63-year-old man was arrested on suspicion of murder in May 2024. |
| July 1983 | Diane Jones | Brightwell, Suffolk | 35-year-old Jones lived with her husband in Coggeshall, Essex. She vanished on the weekend of 23/24 July 1983, and in October her body was found with a fractured skull in an area of Brightwell where someone had been seen taking a rolled-up carpet out of a car three months previously. Jones's husband was arrested in 1983 and again in 1990, but released without charge both times. The husband was always the only suspect, but detectives were not able to obtain enough evidence for a prosecution on either occasion; after he died in 2023, police said that the case was now unlikely to ever be solved. |
| August 1983 | Eila Karjalainen | Oxfordshire | 23-year-old Karjalainen, a Finnish nursing student, was on holiday in England, and probably hitch-hiking, when she was murdered by an unknown perpetrator in the summer of 1983. Karjalainen was last seen in London on 7 August. Her decomposed body was found in Barnham Woods, on the Blenheim Estate at Woodstock, on 25 November. Her rucksack was found five miles away, beside the A40 at Barnard Gate near Oxford. The cause of Karjalainen's death was strangulation. |
| September 1983 | Janice Weston | Cambridgeshire | 36-year-old Weston, a solicitor from London, was found dead in a ditch next to a lay-by of the A1 road in Cambridgeshire on 11 September 1983. Her clothes were still on, and she had suffered repeated blows to the head from a blunt object. Weston appeared to have stopped in the lay-by to change a tyre, and the killer may have been in the car with her for the journey. The car was driven off after her murder and abandoned in Camden Town with her purse and the keys to her two properties left untouched inside. The spare tyre was found attached to the vehicle, but the replaced tyre was never found. A man had ordered a new number plate with the exact number of Weston's car at a garage in Royston 23 miles from the murder site. Weston's 39-year-old husband, to whom she had been married for 15 months and who inherited £200,000 untaxed as a result of her death, was held for 55 hours and the police applied to the Director of Public Prosecutions to charge him, but following an extended deliberation the DPP decided not to pursue a trial. |
| September 1983 | George Murdoch | Aberdeen | Taxi driver Murdoch was found fatally injured on Pitfodels Station Road, Aberdeen, on the evening of 29 September 1983. The 58-year-old had picked up a fare at 8:35 p.m. but never made it to his destination, Culter. A cheese wire was used to attack him and left at the scene. In 2023, police revealed that DNA believed to be the attacker's had been isolated, and said that it was the most significant development in the case to date. |
| October 1983 | Winifred Locke | North Petherton, Somerset | 80-year-old Locke was strangled and sexually assaulted at her sheltered accommodation in North Petherton after her daughter-in-law had left there on 21 October 1983 following a visit to give her her pension and some shopping she had done for her. |
| October 1983 | Stanley Cassidy | Salford, Greater Manchester | Cassidy, 74, was found battered to death at his home in Wingrave House, Amersham Street, on 28 October 1983. A man who denied murder but admitted to burglary was cleared of murder in December 1984. |
| November 1983 | Lloyd Simpson | Hoxton, London | 26-year-old Simpson was shot in the head and stomach as he watched TV in his flat in Shaftesbury Court, Shaftesbury Street, Hoxton, on 5 November 1983. Despite the flat's thin walls, the sound of gunshots apparently did not attract neighbours' attention due to a fireworks display outside the building at that time. Simpson's body was found by his father two days later after he failed to turn up for work at the family's wastepaper business. According to detectives, the murder bore all the hallmarks of a professional killing. A theoretical motive had to do with Simpson's sideline dealings with second-hand cars, but his father strongly disputed this hypothesis. Another hypothesis was that the killer(s) wanted something that was in Simpson's flat (the property was searched thoroughly). |
| November 1983 | Stephen Sylvester | Heathrow Airport, London | The 39-year-old West Indian minicab driver was frenziedly stabbed while on duty in the early hours of 17 November 1983. He was attacked in the car's back seat, where he had got in circumstances that remain unclear, and his body was hidden in the boot. Police found the body when the boot was opened in a car park at Heathrow Airport four days later. Most likely the assailant later killed another taxi driver in the same area: Pardeep Sangha. |
| November 1983 | Hinifan Bibi | Blackburn, West Lothian | 47-year-old Bibi and her 23-year-old son and 21-year-old daughter jumped 30 feet from their flat in Blackburn to escape a nighttime blaze on 27 November 1983. The son and daughter survived the drop, but Bibi herself did not. Teenagers who had been hanging around the area in recent months were thought to have been to blame for this fire as well as ones at other properties there, with the cause of each fire being burning paper pushed through the letterbox. |
| December 1983 | Gary Collins | Brightling, East Sussex | 25-year-old Collins's stabbed and beaten body was discovered in woods in Brightling in March 1984, as was the body of his crossbred collie Trudy, who had been stabbed through the heart. His unlocked grey BMW car had been abandoned at the rail station in nearby Battle on 12 December 1983 (the day he was last seen). The murder of the Hastings man came to be regarded by detectives as possibly a contract killing related to his drug dealing. |
| December 1983 | Robert Cook and John Taylor | Holborn, London | 34-year-old Cook and 48-year-old Taylor were shot at Taylor's flat in Holborn on 31 December 1983. Cook was additionally tortured by having some of his fingers almost severed. The double murder was later suspected to be linked to that of Brian Price and Susan Tetrault, a couple killed at a flat elsewhere in the capital in July 1986. All four victims were reputedly part of the same drug-smuggling ring. |

== 1984 ==
| Year | Victim(s) | Location of body or bodies | Notes |
|---|---|---|---|
| January 1984 | Phyllis Millward | Attacked in Sheerness, died in hospital in Gillingham (both in Kent) | 56-year-old Millward was attacked with a blunt instrument at her ground floor flat in Hope Street, Sheerness, on the night of 12/13 January 1984. No thievery was committed there, and the front door had been forced open. Fresh information led to six men being apprehended in 1992. |
| February 1984 | Colin Maxwell | Streatham, London | 13-year-old Maxwell left his home in Streatham on 19 February 1984 and was never seen again. His skeletal remains were found on 14 June 1986 in the back garden of a house in the district. The cause of death is unknown, although it is believed the teenager was strangled. Prime suspect Albert Newman was cleared of his murder at the Old Bailey in 2004. |
| March 1984 | Pardeep Sangha | By the A30 road close to the southern perimeter fence of Heathrow Airport | Part-time minicab driver Sangha, 31, was stabbed to death with a US Army trench knife while on duty in the early hours of 31 March 1984. His body was found slumped behind the car's passenger seat that day at around 2:00 a.m. Probably the killer intended to hide the body in the boot and then abandon the car at Heathrow Airport, but their plans were thwarted by the vehicle running out of petrol before reaching the airport and their inability to open the boot. It is likely that Sangha's killer was also responsible for the murder of another taxi driver in the same area: Stephen Sylvester. |
| April 1984 | James Doyle Snr, James Doyle Jnr, Andrew Doyle, Tony Doyle, Christina Halleron and Mark Halleron | Glasgow | James Doyle Snr, 53, and his sons James Doyle Jnr, 23, Andrew Doyle, 18, and Tony Doyle, 14, together with Christina Halleron (their 25-year-old sister) and Mark Halleron (her 18-month-old son), died after the flat they were in – a property in Bankend Street, Ruchazie, Glasgow – was set alight using petrol at approximately 2:00 a.m. on 16 April 1984. James Doyle Snr's 51-year-old wife and two other sons were there too but escaped. The murders were regarded as part of the Glasgow ice cream wars because Andrew legitimately sold ice creams from a van and there were people who sought to take over businesses such as his to use them as fronts for criminal activities. Two men were incarcerated for the murders later in 1984, but their convictions were overturned in 2004. |
| April 1984 | WPC Yvonne Fletcher | London | On 17 April 1984, shots were fired into a crowd from two first-floor windows of the Libyan embassy in St James's Square in central London while 25-year-old Fletcher was policing the area during demonstrations there. Fletcher was injured fatally and 11 protesters less severely, and she died at Westminster Hospital. An 11-day siege of the embassy followed, and its staff were then deported. The Libyan government accepted general responsibility for Fletcher's murder in 1999, but no one has ever gone on trial for it. |
| May 1984 | Yvonne Coley | Birmingham | The body of Coley, a 28-year-old sex worker, was discovered in bushes on Cocks Moors Woods Golf Course in Kings Heath on 25 May 1984. She had been strangled with her own bra after being seen getting into a car in Moseley at around midnight. Alun Kyte, the killer of two other sex workers, was suspected of Coley's murder; however, no charges were filed against him in this case. |
| June 1984 | Shelley Morgan | Backwell, Somerset | The US-born 33-year-old mother-of-two disappeared on 11 June 1984 after heading to the Avon Gorge in Bristol to take pictures. Her remains were found on 14 October 1984 in a copse off Long Lane, in Backwell. Morgan was stabbed 14 times in the back in an attack that police believed was sexually motivated, and her clothes, as well as her bag, glasses and Olympus OM20 camera, were stolen and have never been found. |
| July 1984 | Marion Hodge | Body not found | Hodge was a 34-year-old mother-of-two from the Scottish town of Lockerbie who vanished on 6 July 1984, apparently after being dropped off in nearby Dumfries. The Court of Session in Edinburgh formally declared her dead in 1992. Hodge's husband was charged with her murder in December 2023, but medical experts assessed him as unfit for trial. An examination of facts was nevertheless set to begin at the High Court in Glasgow in September 2025, but in May of that year, it was announced that the hearing had been cancelled because the 79-year-old suspect was now deceased. |
| August 1984 | Edna Harvey | Ipswich, Suffolk | 87-year-old Harvey's body was found in her ground-floor flat after neighbours had seen smoke coming out of its front door – smoke from a fire that had been set following her asphyxiation. She may have been killed because a burglary had gone wrong. |
| September 1984 | Mark Billington | Meriden, West Midlands | 15-year-old Billington lived in South Yardley, Birmingham, and was last seen on 1 September 1984 with his blue racing bicycle. His body was found on 11 November, hanging from a tree in remote woodland about seven miles from his home. An inquest returned an open verdict, but the case was revisited and reopened as a murder enquiry after a man living in the area in 1984 – Brian Lunn Field – was convicted in November 2001 of murdering 14-year-old Roy Tutill in 1968. Field is suspected of being responsible for Billington's death. Three men were arrested in 2002 and subsequently released without charge. |
| September 1984 | Lorna Porter | Bellshill, North Lanarkshire | Porter's body was discovered with a cut to the throat near a railway track on 10 September 1984. In 1988, an ex-policeman was convicted of the 18-year-old secretary's murder, but he walked free in 1999 when a "not proven" verdict was delivered following a retrial. (At the time of Porter's death, he was married to a woman who was both a friend of hers and the sister of her fiancé.) It was contended during the 1999 trial that a man lied at the 1988 one by falsely claiming to have witnessed an incident in the garden of the accused the day before Porter was found dead. |
| September 1984 | Mark Yendell | Bristol | On the evening of 10 September 1984, 33-year-old Yendell, a British Rail steward, received fatal blows to the head in the car park of Bristol Temple Meads railway station before being placed on the back seat of his own red Lancia and taken to Welsh Back (an area of dockland between Bristol Bridge and Redcliffe Bridge), where he was dumped into the water. A motive behind the killing has never been clearly established. |
| September 1984 | Elizabeth Sutherland | Culbokie, Ross-shire, Scotland | 36-year-old Sutherland, a mother-of-two, was stabbed to death in her house in Culbokie during the afternoon of 24 September 1984. Her nine-year-old daughter came home from school and found her body a few hours later. Theft was suggested as a motive in spite of no burglary having been committed. A man was convicted of Sutherland's murder in December 1985, but his conviction was quashed by the Appeal Court in 2005. The crime is therefore now officially unsolved, although the police have decided not to hunt for a perpetrator anymore. |
| October 1984 | Barbara Pinder | Battersea, London | 76-year-old Pinder, a professional pianist, was beaten, strangled, and then stabbed 35 times in her flat at 24A Prince of Wales Mansions, Prince of Wales Drive, Battersea, at some point between 26 and 28 October 1984. A motive behind the killing has never been clearly determined. |
| October 1984 | Beverley Trendall | Farman Grove, Northolt, London | 37-year-old Trendall was stabbed through the heart in her flat on 31 October 1984, but her body was not discovered until police forced their way in a month later because her mother was worried about her lack of contact. Her diaries and personal belongings were missing from the scene, and her white Volkswagen Beetle was seen being driven around the area the day after she was killed. Although she was not the type of person who would go back to her flat with a man she did not know, a workmate said that Trendall was heading out to meet a new boyfriend on the night of her death, and she was seen with a mystery man. The case featured on Crimewatch. |
| December 1984 | Lisa Hession | Leigh, Greater Manchester | 14-year-old Hession was attacked and strangled to death on Saturday 8 December 1984 after being snatched as she walked home alone from a party. Her mother reported her missing that night when she had failed to return to their house in Bonnywell Road, Leigh. Police then called and the mother went with them to Leigh Infirmary to identify a body discovered in an alleyway near the residence. Hession's underwear was ripped (suggesting a sexual motive), and she had marks around her neck and a black eye. The case went cold, but advances in DNA profiling meant that the swabbing of men in the Leigh and Wigan area was allowed to take place in 2011. Hession's mother died in 2016. |
| December 1984 | Peter Miller | Great Yarmouth, Norfolk | 24-year-old Miller died from a single stab wound to the chest on 9 December 1984, and was found in his kitchen by his brother. A CS canister believed to have been used by the assailant or the victim during a struggle was also found at the scene. Although he had connections to two men who would kill a man named Derick Tempest in 2009 – James Hall and Andrew Ventham – Miller's murder was not linked to either of them. |

== 1985 ==
| Year | Victim(s) | Location of body or bodies | Notes |
|---|---|---|---|
| January 1985 | Aristos Constantinou | Hampstead Garden Suburb, London | 40-year-old Constantinou, co-founder of the fashion label Ariella, was shot dead in his mansion on The Bishops Avenue ("Billionaires Row"), Hampstead Garden Suburb, on New Year's Day 1985. He was shot with six silver-coloured bullets. Police initially suspected the motive was theft, but a number of family disputes have emerged in the years since Constantinou's death. |
| February 1985 | Louise Goble and Robert Goble Jnr | Hastings, East Sussex | A fire was deliberately started in the early hours of 3 February 1985 at the house of the Goble family, at 38 St Helen's Road in Hastings. Robert Goble Snr and his wife Lee managed to escape with the help of a neighbour, but the couple's two children, 11-year-old Louise and four-year-old Robert, did not survive the attack. A motive has not been established, but there is a theory that the arsonist(s) meant to target a different house but set fire to the Gobles' instead by mistake. |
| February 1985 | Constance "Connie" Aris | Cheltenham, Gloucestershire | 73-year-old Aris was battered to death in her house at 32 Roman Road, Cheltenham. The killer, who was likely known to the widow (since there was no sign of forced entry), appeared to have struck unexpectedly as she sat in a chair and watched TV, and she received a total of five blows to the head from an axe. Aris was last seen when she was returning home from a community centre on the evening of 27 February 1985. Her body was discovered by her son the next day. Despite a massive police hunt, no one was charged with the murder. A possible motive for it was theft (watches, jewellery and Aris's pension book were missing). |
| March 1985 | Pat McCluskey | Birmingham | 52-year-old McCluskey's body was found under a mattress on waste ground in Small Heath, Birmingham, on 17 March 1985. He had been beaten around the head with a brick, his stomach had been slashed and barbed wire had been wrapped around his throat. The Irish builder had last been seen with a ginger-haired man in the Shakespeare pub and had links to the criminal underworld. |
| April 1985 | Jackie Waines | Frampton Cotterell, near Bristol | 35-year-old Jackie Waines, a sex worker and mother-of-three also known as Linda Guest, was stabbed to death on the night of 21/22 April 1985, probably by one of her clients. She was last seen at 11:20 p.m. on Ashley Road in Bristol. One hour later her body was found on Perrinpit Road near Frampton Cotterell. The people who discovered the body also spotted a dark Ford Cortina parked nearby; the car drove off as soon as they emerged. |
| April 1985 | Mary, Mark and Leslie Budworth | Liverpool | Pregnant Mary Budworth and her twin toddler sons Mark and Leslie died at their home in Hindley Walk, Speke, on 22 April 1985. Mary was throttled before the house was set on fire and it was found that her death was from a combination of strangulation, shock and smoke inhalation. Mark and Leslie died from smoke inhalation; three other children who were in the house managed to escape. |
| June 1985 | Sandra Phillips | Swansea | The body of 38-year-old Phillips, a mother-of-four, was found beaten and strangled inside the sex shop she managed, which was locked up. Two brothers were wrongly convicted and spent seven years behind bars before their 1992 release, after which police apologised for investigational failings. An appeal on the programme Crimewatch in the 2000s led to new information but no killer, and in 2009 it was announced that inquiries would cease until and unless there was a fresh lead. When the case was being reinvestigated in the 2000s, a man seen locking the door of the shop at around 11:15 a.m. on the day of the murder (14 June 1985) was identified as the chief suspect. He was described as then being approximately in his late 50s, meaning he would be in his 90s as of the 2020s if still alive. |
| July 1985 | Michael Smith | Clapham Common, London | 25-year-old Smith, an accountant originally from New Zealand, was stabbed 21 times in Clapham Common as he walked home at night on 6 July 1985. Four youths were tried and all admitted attacking him, but the one alleged to have been the person who inflicted the stab wounds claimed they were inflicted by a fifth, mystery assailant. This defendant was found not guilty of murder but guilty of assault occasioning actual bodily harm, while the other three pleaded guilty to assault at the start of the trial. Smith was targeted by the defendants because they mistakenly thought he was homosexual. |
| July 1985 | Shamira, Zahir, Rahim and Alim Kassam | Ilford, London | Pregnant Shamira Kassam, 25, and her sons Zahir, six, Rahim, five, and Alim, 14 months, were killed when their home in Oakwood Gardens, Seven Kings, was set fire to during the early hours of 13 July 1985. Suspected to have been a racially motivated offence, it was the third arson attack on the house within a three-year timespan. |
| July 1985 | Henrietta Osborne | Pimlico, London | The beaten, strangled and stabbed body of the 86-year-old widow was found on her burning bed on 21 July 1985, and a later inspection of the flat suggested it was missing a vase. A man was convicted in 1990 of the manslaughter of both this victim and Barbara Pinder (died in October 1984) after telling the police that he killed them, but the Appeal Court quashed the convictions in 1992 on the grounds that he was a serial false confessor and there was nothing apart from his admissions to link him to either death. |
| August 1985 | Jeffrey McNish | Liverpool | McNish, a 22-year-old from London, was stabbed in the liver while men were beating him with cricket bats at the Toxteth Caribbean Carnival on 10 August 1985. Police claimed that there were people who were shielding his attackers. |
| August 1985 | Dennis Radcliffe | Tottenham, London | Seven men were cleared of the murder of Radcliffe, a 23-year-old fatally stabbed on 25 August 1985 after he had been to a party in Campbell Road, Tottenham. |
| September 1985 | Alexander "Sandy" McClelland | Brighouse, West Yorkshire | 66-year-old McClelland's body was discovered on 7 October 1985 in the boot of a car in the car park between Bethel Street and the Calder and Hebble Navigation. He had been stabbed. McClelland had last been seen on the evening of 12 September near his house in Leeds, and seemed to be in a good mood at the time. The case was re-appealed in 2017. |
| September 1985 | Brian "Little Legs" Clifford | Kennington, London | Career criminal and nightclub owner Clifford, 45, was shot dead in his bedroom in the early hours of 28 September 1985. He had been acquitted in 1979 of the attempted murder of a man shot twice in the head. |
| September/October 1985 | Violet Milsom | Bristol | 62-year-old Milsom was tied up, sexually assaulted and strangled in her flat on Ashley Road, St Pauls, on the night of 30 September/1 October 1985. Her body was severely mutilated and the flat ransacked as well. There was no sign of forced entry, which led to the conclusion that Milsom might have known her assailant and let him in, despite the fact that she used to go to bed very early and not let anyone in after 6:00 p.m. |
| 6 October 1985 | PC Keith Blakelock | London | 40-year-old Blakelock was defending firefighters as they tended to a burning supermarket during the Broadwater Farm riot in Tottenham; he stumbled and was set upon by a mob with bladed weapons. Three men were convicted in 1987, but the convictions were overturned after forensic evidence suggested interview transcripts had been falsified. The officer in charge of the original investigation was cleared of inventing a statement by one of the accused. |
| 9 October 1985 | Philip Wong | Glasgow | 48-year-old Wong was hacked to death in central Glasgow by three men with machetes. It is thought that somebody ordered the killing because Wong, a restaurateur, would not do a deal with a Triad group eager for a share of a Chinese video rental business owned by him. |
| 16 October 1985 | Cyril Martin | Attacked in Maidenhead, died in hospital in Slough (both in Berkshire) | 63-year-old Martin, a homeless father-of-six, was found bludgeoned near the back of a former art college on Marlow Road, Maidenhead, on 21 August 1985. He died eight weeks later. Martin had been beaten with a blunt instrument in a "vicious attack" before being discovered lying in a pool of blood in an outbuilding where he had been sleeping rough. Three people were arrested but not charged. |
| 26 October 1985 | Alison Slade | Tetsworth, Oxfordshire | 17-year-old Slade was seriously injured when people branded "yobs" threw a lump of concrete through the windscreen of the car in which she was travelling in the front passenger seat. This happened as the car passed through Tetsworth, and Slade later died. Four youths were soon interviewed by police. |
| 5 November 1985 | Margaret Greenwood | Houghton-le-Spring, Tyne and Wear | 58-year-old Greenwood was battered to death at her home in Houghton-le-Spring. A boy aged 11 and a man aged 22 – two people believed to have been let in by her because they had fooled her into thinking they were there to collect money for Bonfire Night – were locked up for her murder in 1986, but the boy's conviction was ruled unsafe in 1987 and the man's in 1999 after the Appeal Court had heard evidence of his suggestibility. |
| 6 November 1985 | Phil Nickson | Stoke Newington, London | Nickson, a 32-year-old civil servant, was killed by a blow to the head in Newington Green Road, Stoke Newington, at about 5:20 p.m. on 6 November 1985. An extensive police investigation along with a reconstruction on the BBC programme Crimewatch failed to get the case solved. |
| 16/17 November 1985 | Clara Kirton | Southwark, London | Kirton was a few days shy of her 86th birthday when she was fatally attacked with a broken beer bottle in her Southwark flat. Police are of the opinion that her killer entered her flat to burgle the property and turned on her when she became aware that she had an intruder. |
| 29 November 1985 | Gérard Hoarau | Edgware, London | 34-year-old Hoarau, an exile who had once led an opposition party in the Seychelles, was killed with a submachine gun outside his home on Greencourt Avenue, Edgware. Two men – one aged 77, the other in his 80s – were arrested in 2018 on suspicion of conspiracy to murder. Three people had previously been sentenced in 1986 for perverting the course of justice. |
| 30 November 1985 | Trevor Brindle | Streatham, London | 30-year-old Brindle was hit over the head with an iron bar in his flat on Danbrook Road, Streatham, after returning from a night out. Police charged Brindle's flatmate's boyfriend with his murder despite originally believing the killer to have been a burglar. The flatmate claimed that her boyfriend was at the residence when Brindle arrived home that night, but the boyfriend denied this and was acquitted. |
| December 1985 | Susan Drury | Scunthorpe, Lincolnshire | 24-year-old Drury was discovered dead in her front garden on the morning of Christmas Eve 1985, lying face down and with no obvious signs of assault. It was subsequently found, however, that she had died from forcible asphyxia. |

== 1986 ==
| Year | Victim(s) | Location of body or bodies | Notes |
|---|---|---|---|
| 1986 | Helen Gormeley | Body not found | 64-year-old Gormeley was reported missing in Northamptonshire in 1986, but Humberside Police took over the case and made it into a murder inquiry in 2015. |
| January 1986 | Parvez Akhtar | Bradford, West Yorkshire | 24-year-old Akhtar was murdered after leaving the restaurant he co-owned to take chefs and waitresses home on 12 January 1986. He was strangled to death and then had his throat cut before being left in his car, where a cousin found him. Police have suspected Akhtar's murder to have been ritualistic in nature and to be linked to a feud with another family – a feud said to have begun in Pakistan in the 1950s. |
| January 1986 | Danuta Kaczmarska | Birmingham | Polish GP Kaczmarska was 52 years old when she was found dead in the kitchen of her home on Coniston Close, Hall Green, Birmingham, on 22 January 1986. She had suffered head injuries (probably from a small axe), been gagged with a tea towel and had her body set on fire. Close by were two used champagne glasses. The wire cork cage and foil from the bottle were also found, but the champagne bottle itself was missing. Cash and valuables in the house had been left alone. |
| February 1986 | Rosalia Jones | Luton, Bedfordshire | 24-year-old Jones was murdered at her home on Layham Drive on 14 February 1986. She was found in bed having suffered head injuries and asphyxiation. |
| March 1986 | Kevin Hicks | Body not found | 16-year-old Hicks disappeared on 2 March 1986 after telling his mother he was leaving their home in Addiscombe, Croydon, London, to buy some eggs at a nearby corner shop. He left at about 8:30 p.m., and the last known sighting of him was at about 10:00 p.m. on Shirley Road, walking in the general direction of his home. In 2016 police announced that they were treating Hicks's case as murder. Someone had called the Croydon Advertiser in 1996 to say they knew where his body was, and police have urged this person to come forward. |
| April 1986 | Myra Myers | Hampstead, London | 84-year-old Myers was stabbed 37 times at her flat on Finchley Road, Hampstead, on 22 April 1986. A French neighbour was put on trial after being seen with bloody hands and holding a knife in the road outside the flat. Alleged to have killed Myers because he believed her to be a vampire from whom his girlfriend needed protecting, he claimed in his defence that he was woken up by voices that night, went into the deceased's home, saw her body, and jumped out of a window – cutting himself in the process – because he was afraid the assailant might still be there. The jury cleared him of murder and manslaughter, but the judge was then assured in spite of that that the 20-year-old Frenchman would be spending the night at a private hospital in Roehampton (southwest London) before flying back to France. |
| April 1986 | Peter Thurgood and Lindy Benstead | Rake, West Sussex | 47-year-old Thurgood and 49-year-old Benstead, both from Whitehill in Hampshire, were attacked on 22 April 1986 while in a silver Mazda hire car which was parked in a lay-by near the village of Rake in West Sussex. Thurgood was shot in the head and chest and Benstead was shot in the head. The pair had been conducting an affair, and Benstead's husband was questioned about the murders but had an alibi. |
| 3 May 1986 | Sandra Court | Near Bournemouth, Dorset | Two 15-year-old boys found Court's body in a water-filled ditch at the Avon Causeway after she had attended an office party the night before, celebrating a new job in Spain she was due to start soon. The body was fully clothed, and 27-year-old Court had been killed by strangulation. The suspected killer of Suzy Lamplugh, convicted murderer John Cannan, is also suspected to have killed Court. A pay-and-display parking ticket proves he was in Bournemouth on the night of her murder. |
| May 1986 | Arif Khan | Tipton, West Midlands | Khan, a 28-year-old foundry worker, was found dead in a garage on Coneygree Road on 9 May 1986. The neck and chest of his body had burn marks suggesting that he had been tortured. |
| May 1986 | Fiona Saunders | Church Crookham, Hampshire | The body of Saunders, a 23-year-old mother, was found battered with a hammer and a rolling pin in her home on Army married quarters at Church Crookham, Hampshire, on 12 May 1986. Her husband was away on military exercises at the time. A week earlier, another woman was attacked on the estate by a man with a knife before he escaped. |
| May 1986 | Julie Perigo | Sunderland | 52-year-old Perigo was stabbed to death in her one-bedroom flat on Kidderminster Road, Sunderland. Police discovered her body in the property after forcing entry on 23 May 1986 – a week after she was last seen. Perigo was a sex worker and kept diaries containing names of clients of hers; detectives used these in their investigation, which resulted in three men being arrested and then released. A couple of men who had contact with Perigo around the time of her death were never traced. The case was featured on Crimewatch in July 1986. |
| May 1986 | Richard Griffith | Reading, Berkshire | Griffith, a 20-year-old from Stockwell in London, was stabbed in the heart early on 18 May 1986 at a party on Oxford Road, Reading. Thirteen months later a 23-year-old painter and decorator was acquitted of his murder at Aylesbury Crown Court. |
| May 1986 | Georgina Davis | Salford, Greater Manchester | 71-year-old Davis, a widow and semi-retired nurse who lived alone and was known as Jean to her friends and neighbours, was last seen going into her home on Mildred Street, Higher Broughton, Salford, by a neighbour at around 6:00 p.m. on 20 May 1986. A friend called for her at around 9:00 p.m. that evening to ask if she wanted to go out for a drink, but there was no answer. When she did not arrive for work the next day, her concerned employer visited the house, noticed a broken window and called the police. Davis was found in her bedroom and had died from pressure to the neck. A set of house keys was missing, along with her handbag, a jacket and some Wellington boots. The case was featured on Crimewatch in July 1986. |
| June 1986 | Helena Swann | West Ham, London | 20-year-old Swann, a Ministry of Defence clerk, was found dead in her bedroom on 9 June 1986, strangled with the wire flex of a lamp that was still plugged in. Sexual mutilation had taken place too. A neighbour who was cleared of murder had originally denied ever being in Swann's flat, despite the presence of his palm print there. According to his later version of events, he had noticed that the door to the property was slightly open, entered to investigate, and left in a panic after discovering her corpse inside. |
| June 1986 | Paul Chadeyron | Stockwell, London | 36-year-old Chadeyron was kicked or kneed in the groin and stabbed twice in the heart outside his home on Hackford Road, Stockwell, on 29 June 1986, possibly by a would-be mugger who was incensed that the victim had no money on him. Chadeyron was a solicitor with an office on nearby Brixton Road. |
| July 1986 | Brian Price and Susan Tetrault | Clapham, London | 44-year-old Price and his 36-year-old partner Tetrault were beaten to death with an axe before their bodies were discovered at her flat in Clapham on 13 July 1986. A man was charged with their murders and acquitted. He was an Australian in whose home £1,000, a ring and a contacts book belonging to Price had been found, and who is said to have teamed up with Price to have heroin imported from Turkey. The two men had been in prison together after Price and Tetrault had been sentenced in 1983 for their roles in an operation involving a yacht being used to smuggle cannabis into the UK from Morocco. |
| July 1986 | Desmond Oliver | Notting Hill, London | 23-year-old Oliver was stabbed to death two days after being released from prison, to which he was sentenced for armed robbery in 1982. His body was found outside the Pig & Whistle pub on Bramley Road, Notting Hill, on 24 July 1986, but police could not be sure that was the scene of the attack. A man whose sister Oliver was alleged to have punched on the day of his release was charged with his murder, but the suspect said he was visiting his girlfriend at the time of the stabbing and was acquitted. |
| July 1986 | Suzy Lamplugh | Body not found | 25-year-old Lamplugh was an estate agent who went missing in Fulham, west London, on 28 July 1986. Her family signed legal papers for her to be officially declared dead, presumed murdered, seven years later. Although the Crown Prosecution Service ultimately decided that there was insufficient evidence to charge him, police announced in November 2002 that convicted murderer John Cannan had been interviewed twice over Lamplugh's disappearance. Cannan had been released from a prison near Fulham three days before she vanished. |
| August 1986 | Lorna Hayles | Tasman Road, Clapham, London | Unemployed 28-year-old Hayles from Jamaica was found dead in her flat on 29 August 1986 after a neighbour reported seeing a swarm of flies by her window. She was found in her underclothes in her bedroom, and is thought to have died four weeks earlier. At the front of Hayles's neck were two puncture wounds inflicted with the murder weapon (a carving fork), and wounds on her hands indicated that she tried to defend herself from her attacker. A man was charged with murder after fingerprints from the flat turned out to match his, but the case against him was dropped on the grounds of insufficient evidence. |
| August 1986 | Diane Sindall | Birkenhead, Merseyside | 21-year-old Sindall, a florist and part-time pub barmaid, was sexually assaulted, beaten to death and left in an alleyway in Birkenhead during the early hours of 2 August 1986. She had been walking alone in the area because her van had run out of petrol. A man was convicted of murder in 1987, but his conviction was quashed in 2025 after it had been proven that DNA in semen recovered from the crime scene did not match his profile. |
| August 1986 | Che Keng Fung | Holloway, London | 66-year-old Fung was tied up and beaten to death at his home in Sussex Way, Holloway, on 11 August 1986, and jewellery and luncheon vouchers were stolen. The perpetrator(s) likely also killed Thomas Walker at his home in nearby Caledonian Road a month later. |
| August 1986 | John Malthouse | Cambridge | 56-year-old Malthouse was of no fixed abode. On 22 August 1986, three days after he had arrived in the city, his body was found in the toilets at Victoria Avenue, Midsummer Common, Cambridge. He had been the subject of an extremely violent assault. |
| August 1986 | Michael Collins | Stratford, London | Collins, a 38-year-old gang boss, was set upon in the Moonlight pub on Broadway, Stratford, on 25 August 1986, and bled to death after having an artery severed while being stabbed in the legs and buttocks. Police thought, however, that his death was unintentional and that the aim of the offenders, who apparently consisted of four men, was to frighten rather than kill him. Two men were acquitted. A connection was suspected between Collins's murder and that in neighbouring West Ham five days later of 47-year-old Peter Morris. |
| August 1986 | Frank Moody | Attacked in Bermondsey, London, died in hospital | The 27-year-old pub doorman was shot in what was apparently a gangland incident while on duty at a pub called The Willows on 23 August 1986. Death from his injuries occurred five days later. |
| August 1986 | Peter Morris | West Ham, London | Morris, a 47-year-old club boss, was killed with an axe and at least two other men were severely wounded when they were chased out of a pub and had shots fired at them on 30 August 1986. The pub was known as The Telegraph and located on Church Street, West Ham. Three men extradited from Spain to face charges over Morris's murder were released after the prosecution offered no evidence. |
| August 1986 | Mabel Crandell | Herne Bay, Kent | Crandell, 89, was killed at her bungalow on 30 or 31 August 1986. Neck and facial injuries she had when discovered in the burning building early on 1 September would appear to the pathologist to have been caused by kicking and stamping. A man and his wife went to the police in November 1989 and told them that her ex-husband turned up at their residence on 31 August 1986 and confessed to the crime before returning to the victim's property to set it alight, but his 1991 conviction was overturned in 2003 after three experts testified during his appeal hearing that it was unlikely that Crandell was murdered at the time the couple said he said she was. |
| September 1986 | Thomas Walker | Holloway, London | 60-year-old Walker was tied to a chair, beaten to death and robbed of his wallet at his maisonette in Caledonian Road, Holloway. Whoever committed the acts may also have killed Che Keng Fung at his home in the same district a month earlier. |
| October 1986 | Terry Burns | Westminster, London | On 4 October 1986, 19-year-old Burns was cornered, punched and kicked on stairs at the Embankment tube station after he and a 20-year-old friend were pursued by a group of suspected Millwall F.C. supporters. Both were stabbed too: Burns six times (including in the heart) and his friend twice, but the latter managed to get away from the attackers and survive. Two men were charged with Burns's murder and one of them was additionally charged with his friend's attempted murder, but their trial in 1987 was terminated because none of the Crown witnesses actually saw anyone stab Burns. |
| October 1986 | William "Bill" Smith | Mirfield, West Yorkshire | Smith, 56, was murdered on the evening of 25 October 1986. He had been walking along a path between Mirfield Memorial Park and the canal known as the Calder and Hebble Navigation. Smith's body was found at the bottom of an embankment next to the canal; he had been asphyxiated. Police made a new appeal for information on the 30th anniversary of his death. |
| November 1986 | John Gaspa | Camden Town, London | 41-year-old Gaspa was shot in his flat in Julian Court, Camden Road, and found dead in the property on 10 November. Speculation followed that the murder was over money he owed due to a gambling habit. |
| November 1986 | Narmalan Selvanaygan, Gnanharan Arthimoorty and Karunharan Arthimoorty | East Ham, London | 23-year-old Narmalan Selvanaygan, 20-year-old Gnanharan Arthimoorty and 21-year-old Karunharan Arthimoorty were Tamils killed in a petrol bomb attack at a property on Burges Road, East Ham, on 14 November 1986. Two fellow Tamils' convictions for murder and arson were quashed in 1994 when concerns had been expressed about police methods used to obtain confessions from the men. |
| November 1986 | Ann Ballantine | Edinburgh | Ballantine was a 20-year-old woman whose body was found wrapped in cloth in a canal. She had been throttled to death and then stored for up to two months before being dumped there. |
| December 1986 | John Dobson | Body not found | 34-year-old Dobson disappeared from the campus of Lancaster University on 1 December 1986, and his case was featured on Crimewatch in January 1994. On the day of his disappearance, Dobson was given a lift to the university by another student. They had an arrangement in which Dobson would be driven in by the other man and contribute towards the cost of the petrol. The other man said that he and Dobson talked on that journey but that Dobson was quieter than usual. Two hours after arriving at the university, Dobson went to see a lecturer about some work, but the lecturer said they should speak in greater detail later that afternoon. Dobson could not commit to any time and said he hoped that he would be able to come back, but he never did. He did not have a money or drug problem and there was no sexual scandal to do with him. |
| December 1986 | Linda Cook | Portsmouth, Hampshire | 24-year-old Cook, a former barmaid, was raped, stamped on and throttled on waste ground off Lake Road, Portsmouth, on 9 December 1986. Police believed that the killing could be linked to a spate of increasingly violent sex attacks in the Landport and Buckland areas over the previous two years, apparently committed by an unidentified "baby-faced" ginger man dubbed the "Beast of Buckland" in the press. Footprint evidence showed that Cook's killer wore a shoe with the word "Flash" imprinted on the sole, and the case was dubbed the "Cinderella Murder". Investigations found that less than 7,000 pairs of shoes with the Flash logo had been sold in Britain, with only 133 sold in Portsmouth, many to naval personnel of the nearby naval base. An off-duty sailor was sentenced to life in 1988 but released in 2003 when DNA evidence proved he was not the killer. Police enquiries had originally focused on a key sighting of an agitated man in his early 20s who had hailed a taxi 400 yards from the murder site shortly after the killing. The taxi driver reported the man as asking to go to North End Junction and having a signet ring on his right forefinger. Police announced in 2007 that they were reviewing the case with a view to taking advantage of further advancements in DNA testing. |
| December 1986 | Nigel Bostock | Banks, near Southport, Lancashire | Bostock, a 31-year-old shoe shop owner, was found dead five days before Christmas 1986 in the semi-detached bungalow he lived in by himself. He was half in and half out of the bathtub, and around his neck was a ligature. It was thought that up to three other people were at the bungalow on the night of Bostock's death, but none of them has ever been traced or come forward. Police received an anonymous letter with information about the murder in 2003, but it did not lead to a breakthrough. |

== 1987 ==
| Year | Victim(s) | Location of body or bodies | Notes |
|---|---|---|---|
| January 1987 | Edmund Owusu | Hammersmith, London | Owusu, 46, was shot twice at a kiosk in a car park in Sussex Place, Hammersmith, whilst at work there as an attendant on the evening of 17 January 1987. Much but not all of the money in the kiosk was taken as well – money thought to have amounted to less than £100. Two suspects were seen running towards King Street after the shots were fired. |
| January 1987 | Marina Monti | Shepherd's Bush, London | 27-year-old Monti was strangled and her body left on waste ground in Shepherd's Bush towards the end of January 1987. |
| January 1987 | Rachael Applewhaite | Chelsea, London | 23-year-old Applewhaite's body was found in Sumner Place in Chelsea the day after Marina Monti's was in Shepherd's Bush, but investigators eventually ruled out a link between the deaths of the two sex workers. Applewhaite had been beaten and stamped on. A Mexican who worked at his country's embassy in London handed himself in to the police after finding out from Crimewatch that they were interested in speaking to a man whose description matched his, but they did not charge him with either woman's murder. |
| January 1987 | William Barnard | London | Barnard was a 65-year-old Cricklewood man who died of a heart attack on 29 January after being assaulted in Neasden. The offenders (two youths) wanted money off him, but he was not carrying any. |
| February 1987 | Alvin Burke | Shepherd's Bush, London | On the afternoon of 22 February 1987, 27-year-old Burke was stabbed 54 times and kicked in an attack that started in the foyer of a tower block and continued in the car park. His girlfriend had a flat in the tower block and he was on his way to see her when he encountered his assailant. Theories that the murder was a case of mistaken identity or a contract killing over a drug deal were suggested, as was a motive to do with the multiple women Burke was seeing at the time. |
| March 1987 | Daniel Morgan | Sydenham, London | Morgan was found dead with an axe embedded in his head in the car park of the Golden Lion pub on 10 March 1987. There are suggestions that police corruption is linked to the death of the 37-year-old private investigator. |
| March 1987 | Helen Fleet | Weston-super-Mare, Somerset | 66-year-old Fleet was beaten, stabbed and strangled in an apparently motiveless attack while out walking her dogs in Weston Woods, on the outskirts of Weston-super-Mare, on 28 March 1987. |
| April 1987 | May Richards | Walkden, Greater Manchester | Richards, 89, was discovered lifeless behind her front door on 21 April 1987. She had been tied to a chair and died from a heart attack, but it could not be established whether any items were missing, and the property showed no signs of forced entry. A female pedlar who never came forward and whom detectives were unsuccessful in tracing had been seen peering through windows there earlier on 21 April. |
| May 1987 | Edward Roberts | Croydon, London | 32-year-old Roberts, a scrap metal dealer from West Wickham in southeast London, was shot five times – twice in the head – outside a pub on Sumner Road, Croydon, on 28 May 1987. A man was tried. Although the man, whose fingerprints had been discovered on a newspaper in a stolen van found near the crime scene, had olive skin and this aspect of his appearance – together with his age and height – matched reported descriptions of the perpetrator, the defendant's inability to grow stubble did not tally with eyewitness accounts of a gunman with facial hair, and the judge halted proceedings. Police said afterwards that they were not looking for anyone else when it came to the gunman but would continue to seek out the person who had ordered the shooting. |
| July 1987 | Rosemary Allen | Liverpool | 37-year-old Rosemary Allen, also spelled Rose Marie Allen, was found stabbed to death outside her husband's flat in Parkway, Toxteth, on 27 July 1987. The husband was tried, but the judge ruled there was insufficient evidence for him to be convicted. Semen was found on Allen's blood-covered body, but it was not known when she last had sex. The murder weapon was a casserole dish that belonged to the husband, and it was found at the scene. The husband was alleged to have told a fellow prisoner while on remand: "It is the perfect murder; no witness, no forensics, no way they can get me." |
| August 1987 | Ali Adhami | Attacked in Chelsea, London, died in hospital | 52-year-old Adhami was a Palestinian and a satirical cartoonist for an Arab magazine. He was shot behind his left ear near his office in Chelsea on 22 July 1987, and died at Charing Cross Hospital in Hammersmith on 29 August. |
| August 1987 | Michael Galvin | Attacked in Notting Hill, London, died in hospital | 23-year-old Galvin was stabbed at the Notting Hill Carnival on 30 August 1987 as he tried to stop a youth stealing a can of Coca-Cola from his stall. The conviction of a man jailed for murder was quashed following a claim by a police informer that he had lied under oath due to pressure from police officers for him to do so. |
| September 1987 | Fitzroy Johnson | Attacked in Brixton, London, died in hospital | 27-year-old Johnson died on 4 September 1987 after being shot in the head in Coldharbour Lane, Brixton, two days earlier. He was Jamaican by birth. |
| September 1987 | Simon Dale | Heath, Herefordshire | 68-year-old Dale, a near-blind former architect, was found dead on 13 September 1987 at Heath House, an isolated 17th century mansion close to Herefordshire's border with Shropshire. He had been bludgeoned to death up to two days previously. Dale's ex-wife, Baroness de Stempel (née Susan Wilberforce), stood trial for murder in July 1989 (earlier charges of murder against two of the Baroness's children, Marcus and Sophia Wilberforce, had been dropped); she was found not guilty. No one else has ever been charged with the slaying. The investigation coincidentally revealed a fraud committed by the Baroness against her late aunt, Lady Illingworth. Police investigating the fraud conducted a search of the grounds of Heath House for 30 gold bars said to be there and to have a total value of around £12 million, but none were found. |
| October 1987 | Phillip Saunders | Cardiff | 52-year-old Saunders was beaten with a spade in the garden of his home in Anstee Court, Canton, on the evening of 12 October 1987. He died in hospital five days later. Saunders ran a newsagent's kiosk at Cardiff Central bus station and was robbed of his day's takings during the attack. Three men, known as the Cardiff Newsagent Three, were jailed for his murder, but their convictions were quashed in 1999. |
| October 1987 | Elsa Hannaway | Manchester | 37-year-old Hannaway was beaten, raped and left for dead in Whitworth Park in Rusholme, Manchester, after visiting the West Indian Sports and Social Club and the Big Western pub in Moss Side one night. A woman who got out of a taxi in the early hours of 30 October 1987 told an inquest that she saw a woman arguing and struggling with a Rastafarian man on a footpath in that park. Police think they were Hannaway and her killer. Next to her body was a Sekonda watch believed to have been his. |
| November 1987 | Cyril Fensome, Florence Pennell and Stacey Darlington | Northampton | 63-year-old Fensome and 60-year-old Pennell died when petrol poured through the letterbox was ignited. The third victim of the blaze, seven-year-old Darlington (Pennell's granddaughter), died later in hospital. |
| December 1987 | Michael Brown | Rotherhithe, London | Brown, 34, left Lower Road's Dreadnought pub on 5 December 1987 and had two barrels' worth of bullets fired at him from a car as he waited at a nearby bus stop. |
| December 1987 | Roland Carmagnole | Liverpool | Carmagnole, a 28-year-old student, was beaten to death with a plank of wood on Scotland Road, Liverpool, on 12 December 1987. The case was featured on Crimewatch in 2001, which resulted in new information surfacing. A man was found not guilty of Carmagnole's murder in March 2006. |
| December 1987 | Geoffrey Gilbert | Manchester | The murder of 43-year-old Gilbert, found stabbed to death at his flat in Gorton, Manchester, on 19 December 1987, was thought by police to have been perpetrated due to homophobia on the part of the attacker. |
| December 1987 | Alice and Edna Rowley | Birmingham | Stepsisters Alice and Edna Rowley ran a corner shop together for about 50 years on Greswolde Road, Sparkhill, Birmingham. On 23 December 1987, 87-year-old Alice and 75-year-old Edna were found murdered in their flat adjoining the shop – Alice in the living room (she had been throttled with a ligature) and Edna in her bedroom (she had been suffocated). Although there were no signs of forced entry, the cash drawer was empty and a radio-cassette player, boxes of chocolates, a bottle of Tia Maria and a brown leather suitcase were missing. A neighbour told police that he had seen a scruffy-looking middle-aged man knocking on the internal glass door of the shop on the evening of 22 December, but no further leads emerged. |

== 1988 ==
| Year | Victim(s) | Location of body or bodies | Notes |
|---|---|---|---|
| January 1988 | Anthony Gardner | Manchester | 26-year-old Gardner, a petty criminal from Moss Side, was shot in the chest outside a shebeen near his home on 11 January 1988. Gangster Anthony Johnson was suspected of being the perpetrator, and he was himself unlawfully shot dead just over three years after Gardner was. Johnson's murder is unsolved too. |
| January 1988 | Yana Jones | Walworth, London | 26-year-old Jones was found dead in her flat in Rutley Close, Walworth, on 16 January 1988. She had been stabbed three times in the neck and face but had no defensive injuries, and there were no signs of a break-in, suggesting she had known her murderer(s) and let them in. £300 was missing from the flat. Police said witnesses appeared unwilling to help them. |
| February 1988 | John Lennon | Forest Gate, London | 41-year-old Lennon was found dead with his pockets turned out in St Antony's Road on 20 February 1988. He had died from massive bleeding into the brain following an assault. |
| February 1988 | Kate Simpson | Stockton-on-Tees, County Durham | A woman visiting the widowed 94-year-old's semi-detached house to deliver groceries on 27 February 1988 found her dead in her living room with a knife sticking out of her chest. Three men were sentenced for murder, but attempts to get the convictions against them quashed met with success. The person who stabbed Simpson was probably one of two or three distraction burglars and might not have been planning to go as far as killing someone. |
| March 1988 | Donna Healey | Leeds | Sex worker Healey disappeared after being seen by family the day before her 18th birthday, which was in March 1988. Her body was discovered in a Chapel Allerton park in January 1991, but it was not identified until 2003. In a state of mummification when it was found, it would later be revealed that the body was stored somewhere cool and dry for a considerable amount of time, and the police think that whoever was storing it finally got rid of it because having it at home was no longer viable. |
| March 1988 | Debbie Linsley | Victoria Station, London | Linsley was found murdered in a carriage of a Network SouthEast train at Victoria Station on 23 March 1988. She had died from multiple stab wounds to the heart. Linsley, a 26-year-old hotel manager living and working in Edinburgh, had got into an old-fashioned compartment of the 14:16 train from Petts Wood to London Victoria stations after visiting her parents and brother in Bromley. Screams were heard between Brixton and London Victoria. The killer left traces of his blood at the scene, but the murder weapon, thought to have been a knife with a blade length of between 13 and 19 centimetres, was not found. A £20,000 reward for information leading to his arrest was offered in 2013. Linsley's murder led to Network SouthEast reconfiguring the interiors of its trains and removing the compartments from most workings. |
| March 1988 | Carol Baldwin | Northampton | A jury took several hours to find a 13-year-old girl not guilty of killing 13-year-old Baldwin in a park in Northampton on 26 March 1988. The girl was alleged to have stabbed Baldwin for calling her a name, but in court she insisted that she was not in the park when the stabbing took place and that her murder confession to the police was false and due to coercion. |
| March 1988 | Florence Mills | South Ferriby, Lincolnshire | A man out walking his dog on 19 April 1989 discovered a washed-up human head on the bank of the River Humber at South Ferriby, and the head was found to have been battered with a blunt instrument. The woman to whom the body part belonged was 61 and living in the nearby town of Scunthorpe the last time someone saw her, and was reported missing after failing to turn up to a prearranged meeting with her daughter on 31 March 1988. |
| April 1988 | Inga Maria Hauser | Ballypatrick Forest, near Ballycastle, County Antrim, Northern Ireland | Hauser, 18, a German tourist, was found dead with a broken neck in a remote part of Ballypatrick Forest on 20 April 1988 – two weeks after arriving in Northern Ireland on a ferry from Scotland. Police believe the area around where she was found has residents with information that could assist in solving her case, which has already been progressed by developments in DNA technology. |
| April 1988 | Abdur Rashid | Epping Forest, Essex | 46-year-old Rashid was fatally battered about the head on 26/27 April 1988, after which his body had petrol poured over it and was set alight in Epping Forest. Though no motive is known, the idea that he might have been targeted because of his religion (he had formerly been a mullah at the East London Mosque) cannot be discounted. |
| April 1988 | John Lewis | Attacked in Bermondsey, London, died in hospital | 66-year-old Lewis was kicked repeatedly after going to sleep on a park bench on 7 August 1987. He was known as Scouse and was 5 feet 4 inches (1.63 m) tall. A witness said the assailant was wearing working boots with steel-capped toes, and his bloody footprints were left on a path. Lewis died on 28 April 1988 after slipping into a coma. A man was tried but acquitted when it was found that he owned no boots that matched those used in the attack. |
| May 1988 | Joan Macan | Ashridge, near Berkhamsted, Hertfordshire | Macan was bludgeoned to death after disturbing burglars at her cottage on 6 May 1988 (her 81st birthday). A 47-year-old man appeared before magistrates in 1994 to stand accused of her murder, but no conviction for it followed that hearing. |
| June 1988 | Jack Christian | South Witham, Lincolnshire | 75-year-old Christian was battered to death at his house in Great Close, South Witham, on 8 or 9 June 1988. His son was acquitted of murder in May 1990 after it was revealed that traces of blood found on his trousers – blood matching his father's group – could have got on them as a result of a pet Yorkshire terrier sniffing a pool of blood and then sneezing near them. |
| June 1988 | Sheila Farrow | Stockport, Greater Manchester | 49-year-old Farrow was found beaten to death in a mill yard in Stockport on 17 June 1988. Security cameras filmed her leaving a nearby covered mall with an unknown man in the early hours of that day. He was white, had spiky hair and wore black shoes, a silver-grey suit with flecks and an open-neck shirt. Farrow was a mother-of-eight and her murderer has never been found. |
| June 1988 | Marie Wilks | Close to the section of the M50 motorway on the Gloucestershire/Worcestershire border | Wilks, aged 22 and seven months pregnant, was driving a Morris Marina when it broke down on the M50 motorway on 18 June 1988. Leaving her 13-month-old son and 11-year-old sister in the car, Wilks walked approximately 700 yards to use an emergency telephone to call for help. At some point during the call, she was abducted. Wilks was found dead two days later, three miles from the location of the telephone (which had been found hanging down by its cord). She had been stabbed in the neck. An artist's impression of a suspect resulted in the arrest and subsequent trial of Eddie Browning, a nightclub bouncer who had apparently asked his father what the best route from south Wales to Scotland was. Police were able to eliminate all the 479 other drivers of silver/grey Renault cars in the country with the same first two characters on their number plates as a witness had reported the suspect's car as having, indicating that only Browning could have been responsible. Browning was convicted of murder in November 1989 but released in May 1994 after the Court of Appeal had ruled that the conviction was unsafe due to non-disclosure of a video of a police officer supposedly under partial hypnosis. In May 2018, he died aged 65. Reviews of the Wilks case have failed to uncover any other evidence or suspects. |
| June 1988 | Noel Smith | Limehouse, London | 40-year-old Smith, a Welsh-born London taxi driver, was stabbed in the neck and chest in a frenzied attack while driving a passenger through Limehouse on 19 June 1988. The attack caused him to crash the vehicle into a wall. Witnesses saw a man running from the scene. He was white, about 20 years old, about 5 feet 9 inches (1.75 m) tall, and had brown hair. Smith was the third taxi driver to be murdered in London in the space of three months, and his murder was linked to a few other taxi murders across the country – namely those of John Landa in August 1982, Derek Brann on 6 November 1988, and Sarfraz Ahmed on 15 November 1988. The weapon Smith was killed with was never found. |
| June 1988 | Louise Kay | Body not found | Although her body has never been found and few clues exist as to her fate, the disappearance of 18-year-old Kay has been investigated by police as a suspected murder. Kay was last seen in the early hours of 24 June 1988, when she dropped off a friend in Eastbourne (East Sussex), said she was going to sleep in her car on Beachy Head that night, and drove off alone. Neither she nor her car has been seen since. The case was featured on Crimewatch. In the late 2000s, serial killer Peter Tobin became the prime suspect in Kay's murder after it was discovered that he was working in a hotel in Eastbourne at the time and sold a small hand-painted car after her disappearance. Kay was also said to have met an unknown Scottish man who gave her money for petrol a few days before she went missing. In 2010, police searched two of Tobin's former homes in Brighton but failed to find her body. Kay's disappearance was featured in the 2018 series of The Investigator: A British Crime Story, in which the lead DSI of Operation Anagram, the police unit set up to investigate Tobin's crimes, stated that he believed Tobin killed her. Her case is believed to be linked to the murder of Jessie Earl, who disappeared from Eastbourne in 1980 and whose remains were found on Beachy Head in 1989. |
| June 1988 | Kenneth Challenger (a.k.a. Kenny Roberts) and Richard Duddie | Kingston upon Thames, London | 44-year-old Challenger and 48-year-old Duddie died in a fire at the house they and other vagrants were using as a squat on 27 June 1988. An expert who examined the house afterwards concluded that three separate fires were started there deliberately, merging into one as they spread. A woman in her 50s was jailed for Challenger and Duddie's murders, but the Court of Appeal quashed her convictions 10 years later, in 1999. The men were sharing the squat with her at the time of the blaze. |
| July 1988 | Brian Hayward | Paddington, London | A surveyor reprimanded by Hayward for substandard work and abusing a female colleague was unanimously cleared of murder in July 1989. The surveyor's defence was that his incorrect claim that he was opening up a gym at the time of the killing was a mistake rather than a lie, and that two friends who testified against him gave perjured evidence because £25,000 in reward money was on offer. 51-year-old Hayward was shot dead on 4 July 1988 in an underground car park accessed from Burwood Place in Paddington, and was the head of the estate agency department in which the surveyor worked. |
| July 1988 | Diana Maw | Ealing, London | 36-year-old Maw died almost instantly after a crossbow bolt severed her spinal cord whilst she was on the landing outside her flat in Woodfield Road, Ealing, on 20 July 1988. Her handbag was stolen too and found abandoned on a footpath behind the flat a month later. A man described as being 19 to 21 years old and 5 feet 8 inches (1.73 m) tall was apparently seen carrying a crossbow in the street. A woman whose ex-boyfriend was said to have started seeing Maw in February 1988 was tried for murder, but the charge was dropped due to insufficient evidence. The ex-boyfriend's house was then set alight, but the charge against her for this was also dropped. The woman admitted following her ex-boyfriend and Maw around and was alleged at her trial to have made anonymous phone calls to Maw. Maw, who was planning to move in with the woman's ex-boyfriend, had her briefcase stolen from outside her home a few weeks before the murder as well. |
| July 1988 | Hugh Hannah | Glasgow | 44-year-old Hannah was knifed to death after he opened the door to his flat on Fettercairn Avenue, Drumchapel, Glasgow, during the early hours of 24 July 1988. |
| August 1988 | Percy Francis | Rushden, Northamptonshire | Because no signs of forced entry were discovered at 70-year-old Francis's bungalow, whoever battered and stabbed him at the Rushden property on 1 August 1988 is likely to have been welcomed into it by him. Nothing was found to have been stolen either. |
| August 1988 | Samuel Williamson | Bournemouth, Dorset | 58-year-old Williamson was strangled on 10 August 1988 and his body was left in Cotlands Road. The extraction of a DNA profile from matter from under Williamson's fingernails and the presence of a hair and fingerprints on items from the crime scene led to a 54-year-old man being charged in 2005, but he was acquitted of murder and manslaughter at his trial. |
| August 1988 | Elena Dimitri | Hoxton, London | 20-year-old Dimitri was stabbed twice in the neck and once just above the left breast in her flat in Stanway Street, Hoxton, on 14 August 1988. Nothing was stolen from the flat, she was not sexually assaulted and there were no signs of forced entry. Dimitri was found lightly dressed in a chair following her death and was thought to have let her killer in willingly. Her boyfriend said he entered the flat and saw a knifeman who then fled, and someone whom he identified as that knifeman was tried but acquitted after he claimed he had an alibi. Dimitri was a heroin addict and her previous boyfriend was in prison at the time of the murder. The man who was tried lived with this previous boyfriend's sister and when he was searched he was found to have on him a knife that could have been from Dimitri's flat and could have been the murder weapon. The man admitted knowing her. |
| August 1988 | Michael Williams | Highgate, London | Williams was last seen by a colleague on the London Underground late at night on 26 August 1988. A dog walker found the civil servant's body on a path next to Highgate Wood early the following morning, and possessions he had on him the night before (including his watch and ring) were now missing, it was soon discovered. The cause of death was a blow to the throat probably inflicted with a karate chop. Williams was a 42-year-old married bisexual, and police could not rule out that the attack was motivated by homophobia. |
| August 1988 | Wayne Lomas | Bristol | Lomas's body was found encased in a concrete slab at a terraced house in Southville in October 1993. He had vanished on 30 August 1988 at the age of 31 and was described in newspaper reports as a "hard nut" during the initial search for the car dealer and moneylender with criminal connections. |
| September 1988 | Lee Boxell | Body not found | Boxell was last seen on 10 September 1988 on the High Street in Sutton, south London. In 2014, three men were arrested on suspicion of murder, indecency with children and conspiracy to pervert the course of justice, and a woman on suspicion of indecency with children and conspiracy to pervert the course of justice. None were charged. The police believe that 15-year-old Boxell was killed after witnessing a sexual assault on another person at an informal youth club. |
| September 1988 | John Ward | Attacked in Manor Park, London, died in hospital | 23-year-old Ward received seven stab wounds in the toilets at The Avenue – a pub on Church Road, Manor Park – after five men with knives confronted him and his brother. He died two days later, on 12 September. A man found not guilty of murder or violent disorder admitted leaving the establishment at the same time as the assailants but denied that he was involved in the incident himself. His defence was that he saw them exit the toilets while he was having a drink there and left at that point because he did not wish to get caught up in any trouble. |
| September 1988 | David Short | Broadstairs, Kent | 36-year-old Short had his face sprayed with CS gas and then his head struck twice with an unknown object at the doorstep of his Broadstairs home on 22 September 1988. The victim was said to have struggled with debt, but hard evidence that he was killed for failing to pay up was not found. |
| September 1988 | Albert Smith | Enfield, London | 60-year-old Smith was found throttled to death in his house in Carterhatch Road, Enfield, on 23 September 1988. A man who was one of a group of builders working on Smith's home a few days before his murder was tried but acquitted when the judge determined that there was insufficient evidence against him. The only significant evidence against him was a claim that he confessed to the murder in a pub. |
| September 1988 | Ray Anstey | Plymouth, Devon | 53-year-old Anstey was stabbed several times in the chest at the Pennycross Sports and Social Club in Plymouth. He was probably locking up the building he was the steward of when he was attacked. The fruit machines at the club were emptied and the phone wires ripped out, and Anstey's expensive ring, wallet, keys and lighter were later found to be missing. A witness saw two men getting into a dark brown estate car, possibly a Mark 3 Ford Cortina, at about 12:10 a.m. on 30 September 1988. Anstey's case featured on Crimewatch. |
| October 1988 | Laurence Winstanley | Baitings Reservoir, West Yorkshire | 24-year-old Winstanley, a car mechanic, was last seen at his local pub in Oldham, Greater Manchester, on 2 October 1988. His body was found in Baitings Reservoir almost a year later, on 26 September 1989. He had been shot, set on fire, wrapped in a curtain and weighed down with a pickaxe head. A man who has never been traced sold Winstanley's car to a scrap dealer in the Oldham area a couple of days after his disappearance. |
| October 1988 | Linda Donaldson | Lowton, Greater Manchester | 31-year-old Donaldson was a sex worker from Liverpool. Her body was found in a ditch on Winwick Lane, Lowton, near Leigh, on 18 October 1988. She had been stabbed elsewhere before being mutilated and washed after death, and her clothing was missing. Police stated in 2018 that they would be conducting fresh interviews about her death. It has been suggested that Donaldson's murder could be connected to the murders of Julie Finley and Maria Requena. Police have investigated prostitute killer David Smith as a suspect in both Donaldson and Requena's murders. |
| October 1988 | James Durrant | Surbiton, London | Durrant, 74, was murdered on 26 October 1988 in his suburban house on Cranes Park Avenue, Surbiton. He was a retired solicitor who had spent the earlier part of that evening attending a Masonic function and having dinner at a pub in central London, and it was believed that his attacker might have been with him as he entered his home after travelling back to Surbiton by train. The fatal injury was a head wound sustained when Durrant was hit a single time with an object resembling a baseball bat. |
| November 1988 | Harry Howell | Blackpool, Lancashire | 74-year-old Howell, a former mechanic, was last seen outside his home at Ibbison Court, off Central Drive, Blackpool, on 5 November 1988. His body was found by a window cleaner 17 days later, slumped in a chair in his living room. He had been bludgeoned with a heavy weapon, and police thought he had died on the night he was last seen. Burglary is believed to have been the motive behind Howell's murder: Thousands of pounds in cash and a gold watch were missing, and Howell had let slip at his local pub that he kept his life savings at home. His murder was featured on the BBC's Crimewatch the following year. |
| November 1988 | Derek Brann | By the M20 in Kent | Although the inside of 48-year-old Brann's taxi was soaked with blood when it was found in Seabrook (a coastal village near his home town of Folkestone), Kent, on 6 November 1988, Brann himself was nowhere to be seen, but he was found dead with 33 stab wounds some miles from there a fortnight later. Theft was the presumed motive of the killer(s) because £50 was missing. |
| December 1988 | John Heron | Attacked at Waterloo Station, London, died in hospital | 34-year-old Heron was stabbed in the back while queueing for information at London Waterloo station on the evening of 9 December 1988. The killer had wrongly accused him of jumping the queue, and was described as being white, between 30 and 40 years old, between 5 feet 6 inches (1.68 m) and 5 feet 9 inches (1.75 m) tall, of medium build, and with a long thin face and dark straggly greasy brown collar-length hair. He was believed to have been wearing a light grey jacket and looked scruffy. Police concluded he was probably Scottish and probably being shielded by people in Scotland. |
| December 1988 | Lionel Webb | Stoke Newington, London | 38-year-old Webb was a London-based estate agent who had been involved in a foiled plot with four other men to rob a Harborne (West Midlands) bank's security van in 1986. He was shot dead in his Stoke Newington office on 11 December 1988, and drugs were discovered on the premises when they were being searched following the killing. |
| December 1988 | Peter Hurburgh | Fickleshole, Surrey | 57-year-old Hurburgh was beaten and had a fatal heart attack when, along with another man, he was dragged out of his parked car in a field near a pub in Fickleshole during the early hours of 16 December 1988. Those responsible then went on to target people in other parts of Surrey. A man in Oxted suffered a cut to his arm and two people in Fetcham were tied up and gagged during house robberies in those places, but nobody else actually died. Three men ("the M25 Three") convicted in 1990 of Hurburgh's murder and the other offences were freed in 2000 when the Appeal Court ruled that irregularities made their convictions unsafe. However, an appeal judge said when reluctantly releasing the three: "In our view the case against all three appellants was formidable. The evidence against Rowe was overwhelming... For the better understanding of those who have listened to this judgment and of those who may report it hereafter, this is not a finding of innocence, far from it." |

== 1989 ==
| Year | Victim(s) | Location of body or bodies | Notes |
|---|---|---|---|
| January 1989 | Michael Fahey | Bristol | Fahey, 33, was found to be dead on the corner of Ashley Road and Picton Street, Bristol, on 13 January 1989 after being hit on the head with a blunt instrument the night before. Whether the vagrant died there or at a different location was indeterminable. |
| January 1989 | Frederick and Miriam Dunkley | Wembley, London | 63-year-old Frederick Dunkley and his 59-year-old wife Miriam were battered to death with a hammer in their house in Clifford Road, Wembley, on 23 January 1989. The property was then set on fire, and they were found dead in the garage after the fire had been discovered at 6:00 p.m. They had only returned home at 5:20 p.m., meaning they must have been murdered in those 40 minutes. The table was found to have been laid out for a meal, nothing had been stolen, and there was no sign of forced entry or any interference with the house. The Dunkleys' unemployed son was put on trial for their murders, with it being said that he had killed them after they had refused to lend him money and excluded him from their will in favour of his own son. The pair's estate was worth £250,000. However, the case against him was circumstantial and the timings would have made it difficult for him to carry out the murders, and he was acquitted. After this, the police said that the case was closed and they were not looking for anyone else. |
| January 1989 | Mary McManus | Peterborough, Cambridgeshire | 66-year-old McManus was found deceased in her home on Queens Road, Fletton, on 28 January 1989. She had been battered, bitten, stabbed in the chest and sexually assaulted. McManus's ex-lodger was tried twice for her murder and convicted at the second trial, but the Appeal Court later overturned his conviction. |
| February 1989 | Jeanette Kempton | Wangford, Suffolk | 31-year-old Kempton was last seen at the Loughborough Hotel in Brixton, south London, at 7:15 p.m. on 2 February 1989. She lived in Brixton with her family and is not thought to have had any connections to Suffolk, where her body was found on 18 February on the Earl of Stradbroke's estate at Wangford, just off the A12. Kempton had been strangled, and her coat, one shoe, some jewellery, her purse, and a wreath she had bought for a funeral were missing. Police had five suspects in her murder at one stage, including her ex-husband. The case was featured on Crimewatch in May 1989. |
| February 1989 | James "Jimmy" Hassard | Caol, near Fort William, Scotland | The badly beaten body of Hassard, 47, was found in a car park in the Highland village of Caol in the early hours of Saturday, 18 February 1989. He had been drinking at the nearby Lochaber Bar between about 8:00 p.m. on Friday, 17 February and 1:00 a.m. on Saturday. Despite a lengthy police inquiry, no one has ever been caught. In 2010, the Northern Constabulary said they were conducting a review of the case in the hope that some new evidence would come to light and ultimately resolve it. |
| March 1989 | Patrick Byrne | South Norwood, London | 45-year-old Byrne was battered with a wooden plank in Robson Road, South Norwood, on 11 March 1989. Witnesses described the culprit as a white man aged between 20 and 28. It was also reported that Byrne was followed into some underground toilets by a young man he scuffled with when they came out of there, and that Byrne may have torn the man's jacket. This man was said to have then found a piece of wood and chased Byrne before beating him to death. A man walked into a police station and confessed to Byrne's murder in 1996, but he was acquitted at trial after it was heard that there were discrepancies between his account and what actually happened and that he was suffering from depression at the time. |
| March 1989 | Cyril Davies | Swansea | A 27-year-old man was acquitted in March 1990 of the murder of 51-year-old Davies, who was found battered to death in his Swansea home on 22 March 1989 after visiting a gay haunt in the city three days earlier. |
| April 1989 | Saifuddin Figa Hussein | Sheffield | 36-year-old Hussein was a vagrant murdered in a stairwell of a car park in Blonk Street, Sheffield, on 10 April 1989. Injuries suggested he was kicked to death, and his easygoing nature suggested the attack was an act of violence for the sake of violence. |
| April 1989 | Peter Smith | Glasgow | 45-year-old Smith was stabbed in the heart near toilets in central Glasgow on 11 April 1989. The toilets were used as a gay meeting place. Two men were charged with Smith's murder, but one of them had the charge dropped when he agreed to testify against the other suspect, who was convicted in August 1989 but had his conviction quashed in July 2006 after it was accepted that police statements showing that a key witness was unreliable should not have been kept from the 1989 trial's defence team. |
| June 1989 | Tina Bell | Billingham, County Durham | 18-year-old Bell went missing soon after leaving a flat above a Billingham fruit shop in early June. Not until over 10 months later, when her skull, collarbone and shoulder blade had been found on wasteland near ICI's Cassel Works, was it confirmed that she had been murdered. Tests done on the skull indicated that the killer had tried to dissolve Bell's body in a chemical of some sort. |
| July 1989 | Martin Broom | Boreham, near Chelmsford, Essex | Broom, 29, was beaten to death with a hammer at his home in Sussex Close, Boreham, on 22 July 1989. The murder weapon and a bloodied wrench were found at the scene and nothing appeared to have been stolen. Essex Police made a new appeal for information in August 2019. |
| July 1989 | George Thorley | Bristol | Thorley remained alive for up to three days after a fatal assault in Bristol. Although the 45-year-old homeless former serviceman told people at the resettlement centre where he was staying that the assault occurred in Gloucester, police piecing together his last movements found a witness who said he looked fine as he left a Bristol pub within hours of arriving in the city from Gloucester on 27 July 1989, and another witness who said he had a swollen black eye and other facial injuries on 28 July. Thorley died in hospital on 30 July. |
| August 1989 | Andrew Maddocks | Bickerstaffe, Lancashire | 22-year-old Maddocks was dumped in a septic tank after being garrotted and beaten around the head. His body was found in the tank, which was in the grounds of a restaurant where he lived and worked as the head chef, on 12 August 1989, and drowning was given as the cause of his death. |
| September 1989 | Trevor Metcalfe | Redcar, North Yorkshire | Metcalfe's body was found at Dormanstown recreation ground on 16 September 1989; he had been beaten and suffered a brain haemorrhage. An anonymous letter from someone claiming to have more information about the killing of the 25-year-old was sent to police in September 1998. |
| September 1989 | Louis/Lewis Raggett | Attacked in Ash, Surrey; died at Cambridge Military Hospital in Aldershot, Hampshire | 57-year-old Raggett was the landlord of many bedsits in the Aldershot area, and it was thought that a tenant falling foul of him for rent arrears may have had something to do with him being stabbed and beaten on 23 September 1989 as he returned to his house at nighttime. The only person who has been indicted over Raggett's murder, however, is his wife, who was with him when the two assailants turned up on a motorcycle. She was accused of hiring hitmen to kill him and ensuring that neither of her two large dogs would be in a place where it could interfere with their mission, but the jury at her trial found her not guilty. |
| October 1989 | Ricky Haywood | Southampton | Police believe that when 36-year-old Haywood was shot five times in the flat above his Southampton jewellery shop on 16 October 1989, it was probably by a hired killer acting on behalf of someone Haywood had got on the wrong side of. A £100,000 reward for information leading to a conviction for his murder was still on offer as of October 2009. |
| November 1989 | William Youens | Gillingham, Kent | 51-year-old Youens, a drug dealer from Chatham, was found hacked to death yards from his parked red Transit van on the evening of 7 November 1989. The van's lights were still on and the radio was playing. |
| November 1989 | Carmel Gamble | Stroud, Gloucestershire | Firefighters called to a blaze at a holiday cottage in Rodborough on 12 November 1989 (Remembrance Sunday) found the 43-year-old woman's remains inside. It was later determined that she had died not as a result of the fire, but as a result of her head being battered. Police would still like to speak to a man seen arguing with Gamble in Stroud High Street a week before the murder. |
| November/December 1989 | John Lane | Limehouse, London | Lane, a 44-year-old member of a cocaine-smuggling gang, was shot in the back and left under rubble on a building site in Limehouse in late November or early December 1989. Investigating officers thought the killing was to do with debt or a double-cross. A newspaper reported the following October that police were linking Lane's death and several others to a gang branded "the new Krays". |
| December 1989 | Clifford Howes | Blacknest, Hampshire | Petrol was poured through the wooden doors of a country pub's cellar and a homemade wick was lit to start a fire there during the night of 4–5 December 1989. Though the flame on the wick went out before it had burnt down enough of it to reach the petrol, a huge explosion was nonetheless triggered by fumes from the petrol causing an automatic dehumidifier in the cellar to come on and spark in the process. The explosion destroyed the building, killing 49-year-old pub chef Howes and seriously injuring the bar manager, and a likely motive is something that investigators have never been able to come up with. |
| December 1989 | Ian Murray Erskine | Upware, Cambridgeshire | The body of Erskine, 44, was found in the River Cam at Upware on 25 March 1990. Erskine had last been seen on 15 December 1989 at his workplace, the Bank of England, in the City of London. It is not known if he returned to his home at 5 Norland Square, Notting Hill, that evening. Following his disappearance, Erskine's credit card was used to make a number of cash withdrawals from his account, hire a car, and purchase a watch and a five-day return ticket to the Netherlands. His body was found wrapped in plastic bags and the cause of his death could not be determined. Police suspected Erskine's murder was related to his homosexuality. |
| December 1989 | Keith Burgess | Bristol | 38-year-old Burgess was found brutally murdered at his flat on Duchess Road, Clifton, on 17 December 1989. He had been attacked with a hammer and stabbed. Burgess had last been seen at the Alma Tavern pub at lunchtime that day. It was believed he may have invited the attacker into his home, and people told of having seen a man of scruffy appearance hanging around there. |
| December 1989 | Terry Gooderham and Maxine Arnold | Epping Forest, Essex | The couple were shot dead in Gooderham's Mercedes three days before Christmas after leaving their flat in Walthamstow when they had sat down for an evening meal. Gooderham was 38 and Arnold was 32. It has been suggested that Gooderham was murdered for fear that he would blow the whistle over a scam he had found out about in his job as a stocktaker, and that Arnold was murdered too because she was in the wrong place at the wrong time. |

== See also ==
- List of people who disappeared mysteriously
- The Disappeared (Northern Ireland)
- List of bombings during the Troubles
- Chris Clark, British author who writes and produces documentaries about unsolved crimes
- David Smith, convicted killer suspected of being responsible for unsolved murders
