= Killing of Marian Beattie =

1973 killing in Northern Ireland

- Location: 54.440292°N 7.003959°W; Hadden's Quarry, near Aughnacloy, County Tyrone, Northern Ireland
- Date: 31 March 1973; Approximately 1:00 am
- Victim: Marian Beattie

On 31 March 1973, Marian Beattie, an 18‑year‑old Catholic woman from Portadown, County Armagh, Northern Ireland, was found dead at the bottom of Hadden's Quarry near Aughnacloy, County Tyrone. She had last been seen shortly after 1:00 am leaving a dance with a young man. Her body was discovered several hours later in the quarry close to the venue. Despite extensive investigation at the time and repeated appeals in the decades since, her killing remains unsolved.

== Background ==
Marian Beattie was from Portadown, County Armagh, Northern Ireland, and was the fifth of seven children in a Catholic family. She was described by her family as a "brilliant sister" and a "special person who would have gone out of her way to help anyone out".

== Killing ==
On the evening of 30 March 1973, Beattie attended a Save the Children charity dance at Hadden's Garage near Aughnacloy, County Tyrone, accompanied by her older brother Isadore (a member of the performing band, Tuxedo Junction) and her best friend, Nuala.

Beattie was last seen leaving the dance shortly after 1:00 am on 31 March, with a young man described as having long blond hair. Her body was discovered several hours later at the bottom of Hadden's Quarry, which was approximately 80 to 100 feet deep. She was partially clothed and had sustained injuries consistent with a fall. Investigators also found a piece of metal near her body, which was believed to have been used to strike her. The buttons from her blouse were stacked neatly beside her, while spent matches were also lying nearby, leading police to believe the killer may have used them for light in the dark quarry.

=== Case review ===
In February 2022, the Police Ombudsman for Northern Ireland published a report identifying significant failings in the original RUC investigation. These included poor record‑keeping, the failure to retain items that might have yielded DNA evidence, and the failure to pursue key investigative leads. Following the report, the case was transferred to the Legacy Investigation Branch of the Police Service of Northern Ireland (PSNI) in 2023 for further review.

On 22 May 2025, the Legacy Investigation Branch issued a renewed appeal for information regarding the murder. Anyone who had attended the dance at Hadden's Garage in 1973 was urged to come forward, and it was emphasised that even small details could help further the investigation. Police appealed specifically to those who might have seen Beattie dancing or speaking with anyone at the event, those who saw her leaving the venue, or anyone who noticed someone returning home later that night in a "distressed" state "or with dirt on their clothes".

In June 2025, the Police Ombudsman released a further report expanding on concerns previously raised about the original investigation. It identified organisational and procedural shortcomings, including missed lines of inquiry, unexamined inconsistencies in suspect accounts, and limited engagement with Beattie's family, recording only eight points of contact over five decades. The report also disclosed that 13 individuals had been considered suspects, including three with alleged links to loyalist paramilitary groups and two who had served as police officers. The Ombudsman recommended that the PSNI commission an independent review. Beattie's family welcomed the findings, stating that they believed they knew who was responsible and expressing concern that the individual may have been protected due to connections within loyalist organisations.

In October 2025, Beattie's family met with the PSNI chief constable to discuss the handling of the case. Her brother Gerard said, "We would've liked an apology but we didn't get it," adding that the family had been "continually let down by the police". The PSNI acknowledged the family's ongoing pain and affirmed its commitment to helping them obtain answers. Days later, the family claimed that the man they believe murdered Beattie – who had been convicted of indecent assault in April 1974 – was protected by members of the loyalist Glenanne gang. By March 2026, the PSNI confirmed that its legacy detectives were continuing to investigate the case, and a further appeal for information was issued.

=== Arrest ===
On 2 July 2026, a man in his 70s was arrested in connection with Beattie's killing and released on bail the same day.

== Media coverage ==
Beattie's killing was featured in the Nolan True Crime podcast in 2019, the BBC Northern Ireland series Murder in the Badlands in 2022, and the Irish-language true crime series Marú inár Measc on TG4 in 2025.

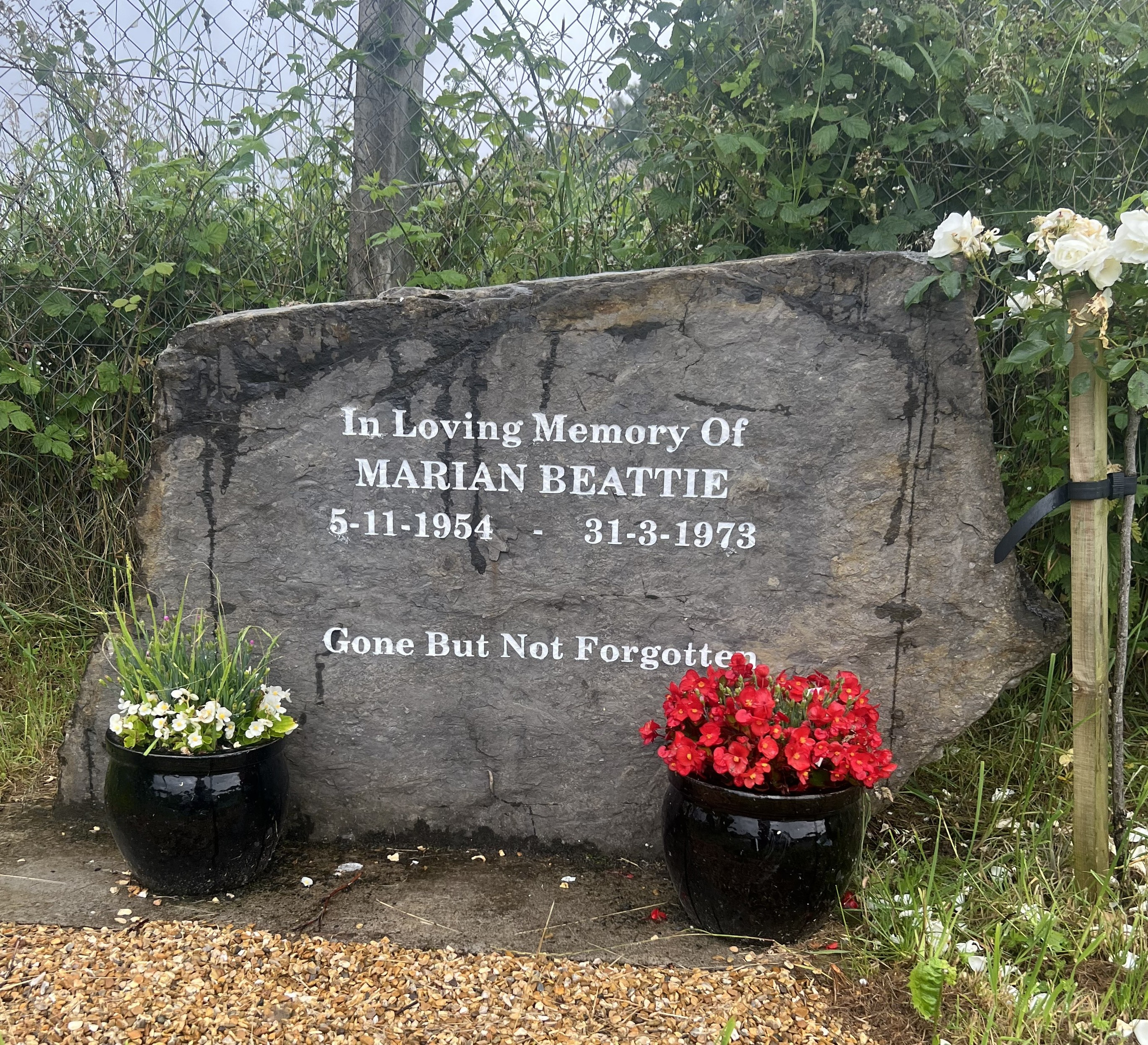
Beattie's memorial stone near the former Hadden's Quarry, outside Aughnacloy

== Legacy ==
A memorial stone for Beattie was unveiled near the former quarry on 1 April 2023, marking the 50th anniversary of her death. The service was attended by family members and members of the local community.

== See also ==
- List of unsolved murders (1900–1979)
- Killing of Inga Maria Hauser
