= Disappearance of Patrick Warren and David Spencer =

1996 missing persons case, in Solihull in England

Patrick Warren
- Born: 4 January 1985
- Disappeared: 27 December 1996 (age 11); Solihull, West Midlands, England
- Status: Missing for 29 years, 7 months and 16 days
- Height: 4 ft 10 in (147 cm)

David Spencer
- Born: 14 December 1983
- Disappeared: 27 December 1996 (age 13); Solihull, West Midlands, England
- Status: Missing for 29 years, 7 months and 16 days
- Height: 4 ft 7 in (140 cm)

Patrick Warren (born 1985) and David Spencer (b. 1983) were two English schoolboys who disappeared on 27 December 1996 in the town of Solihull, near Birmingham. Although initially treated by the police as runaways, they are now presumed deceased. Despite a BBC Crimewatch special report on the boys, along with numerous appeals from both their families, the case remains unsolved.

Brian Lunn Field, convicted paedophile and sex offender, emerged as the prime suspect in the case after his 2001 conviction for the abduction, rape and murder of 14-year-old Roy Tutill in 1968. Field lived in Solihull in 1996 and is known to have been driving around in a white van in the vicinity of the boys' last known location on the night of their disappearance, while under the influence of alcohol. He had previously been convicted in 1986 of abducting two boys in his car and attempting to rape them. Police interviewed Field in prison on multiple occasions about the boys' disappearance and suspected him of killing them, but did not have sufficient evidence to charge him. He died in prison in February 2024.

== Disappearance ==
On the evening of Boxing Day 1996, best friends Patrick Warren and David Spencer left their Chelmsley Wood residences to play outside. Patrick left on his brand-new bicycle, which had been a Christmas present, while David was on foot. The boys had been spotted by a police officer earlier that afternoon playing with another group of children in Meriden Park, where they had been warned by the officer not to play on the frozen pond. After returning home, they told their parents of their plans to visit one of Patrick's brothers that evening. Derek Warren, another of Patrick's brothers, went looking for the boys the next day when he found out that they had not arrived.

The last known sighting of the boys was just after midnight by a petrol station attendant who gave them a packet of biscuits. Patrick's brand-new red Apollo bicycle was found abandoned behind the petrol station near the bins, although the police did not realise that it was his until several weeks later. The petrol station attendant said she saw the boys walking toward the local shopping centre.

== Investigation ==
The police initially treated the boys' disappearance as a normal missing persons inquiry, but despite no confirmed sightings of them after Boxing Day, senior officers told the media that there was no reason to suppose that they had come to any harm. Professor David Wilson, a criminologist who studied the police's initial response to the boys' disappearance, concluded that David and Patrick's working-class background affected how their case was handled:

"If it had been two boys from [middle class] Solihull that went missing, that case would've been treated initially very differently. And it's about that word we're never allowed to use, class — this was about a class judgement that was made which was prepared to see them as runaways, as opposed to vulnerable."

The boys' disappearance received little media attention beyond the local press, in what has been cited as an example of 'missing white girl syndrome'. However, the boys' faces were among the first to appear on milk cartons in a groundbreaking campaign launched by the National Missing Persons Helpline in April 1997. Just days after the boys disappeared, 17-year-old Nicola Dixon was found raped and murdered in a graveyard eight miles away in Sutton Coldfield. Though her killer was found and convicted, the police say that police resources and media attention between Christmas 1996 and New Years Day 1997 was dominated by the Dixon case.

On the tenth anniversary of their disappearance, the boys were the subject of a BBC Crimewatch special appeal for information, which drew no fresh leads. In 2003, West Midlands Police publicly announced that they had arrested a 37-year-old man in connection with the disappearances; he was later released on bail and has never been charged. Following a second Crimewatch appeal, fresh new leads were announced by the police.

In 2006, the police announced they were "closer than ever" to solving the mystery of what happened to the boys but despite renewed hope from the families, no one has ever been charged with their abduction.

In 2016, a fresh appeal for information was launched. DCI Caroline Marsh of West Midlands Police stated her belief that both boys were deceased, and said that the force would never close the case until it learned what had happened to them.

In 2023, West Midlands Police released a statement that “This very sad case has been reviewed several times and a current review is still in progress. We continue to ask anyone with information regarding the boys’ disappearance and who has not yet contacted us, to please do so. We will always act upon new information."

== Brian Lunn Field as a prime suspect ==
"I don't believe in coincidences. You've got a man who's got a previous conviction for abducting children, abducting two children together, he's in the vicinity of where two boys go missing. Ultimately, for me, that makes him a very good suspect for the boys. In my view, I've never seen a better suspect for the abduction of those boys than Brian Field."

— Graham Hill, 2021. Hill has interviewed Field on numerous occasions for West Midlands Police, and was the interviewer to whom Field confessed the murder of Roy Tutill in 2001.

Field became the prime suspect in the case after his conviction in 2001 for the abduction, rape and murder of Roy Tutill in Surrey in 1968. After Field's conviction it was reported that police were already investigating him for Warren and Spencer's disappearance in 1996, alongside the murder of another boy committed in Solihull in 1984.

Warren and Spencer were found to have last been seen close to Field's home at the time in Solihull. Field had worked as a self-employed gardener in the area for a number of local families, had access to open ground in the area, and was a regular drinker in pubs close to the boys' homes. He had also worked as a gardener for the family of the boy murdered in 1984. Field had received six previous convictions for sexual offences against boys, including a 1986 conviction for abducting two boys, aged 13 and 16, in his car with the intent of raping them. After offering the boys a lift he threatened them with a wheel brace and told them to remove their clothes, but the boys were able to escape after jumping from the moving car. Field remains the only person in British criminal history to have been convicted of such a crime.

Police interviewed Field in prison in 2006 about the disappearance of Warren and Spencer, suspecting he may have killed them. It was thought he had lured the boys from outside the shop they were last seen visiting, killed them and then buried their bodies. Field denied involvement and there was insufficient evidence to charge him. Officers dug up land in 2006 that he used as a dumping ground at Old Damson Lane in Solihull but did not find anything.

It has since been ascertained by West Midlands Police that Field was driving round the area of the boys' last sighting in a van on the night of their disappearance, and that he was doing so under the influence of alcohol. This was notable as Field was known to have turned violent when drunk and that he committed most of his crimes while intoxicated. Field himself said after confessing to Tutill's murder that alcohol was a trigger for him wanting to commit criminal acts. Evidence also existed which indicated that Field had been seen speaking to the boys days before their disappearance, suggesting that he may have groomed them in the lead-up to their last sighting. This could explain why no one heard screams or a struggle on the night of the boys' disappearance, as they may have already known Field and got into his vehicle willingly.

In 2021, criminologist David Wilson released a documentary as part of his Footsteps of Killers series on the subject of Warren and Spencer's disappearance, in which he spoke to Graham Hill, the detective that got Field to confess to Tutill's murder in 2001. Hill interviewed Field a number of times about the boys' disappearance for West Midlands Police, and said that he believed Field was responsible for their murder.

Field died in prison in February 2024 aged 87.

== 2021 documentary and dig ==
External videos
- YouTube videos
- In the Footsteps of Killlers Series 1 Episode 1

After the release of Wilson's In the Footsteps of Killers documentary in 2021, locals organised a dig of a field off Damson Wood Lane in Solihull after a tip-off was received from a man who said he had seen a man digging there at the time of the boys' disappearance. The now-adult brother of David Spencer helped organise the search.

== See also ==
- List of people who disappeared
- Murder of Roy Tutill – 1968 murder that suspect Brian Lunn Field was convicted of in 2001
- Murder of Lindsay Rimer – unsolved 1994 case in which a 13-year-old girl disappeared from Yorkshire and was found one year later in a nearby canal
- Disappearance of Suzy Lamplugh – one of Britain's most famous disappearance cases
