= Disappearance of Lee Boxell =

Unsolved 1988 disappearance of 15-year-old

Lee Boxell
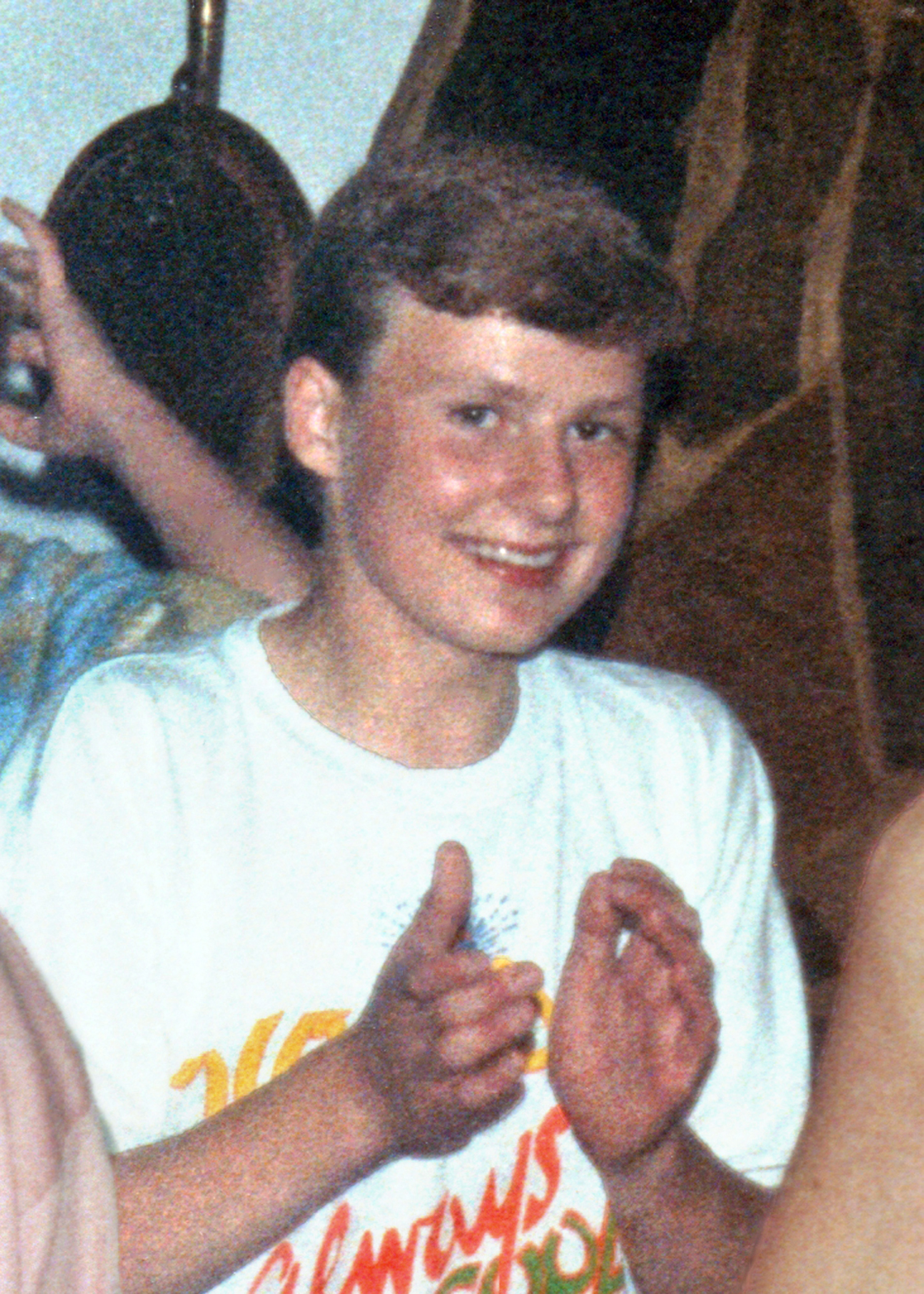
- Boxell in 1987
- Born: Lee Darren Boxell; 16 February 1973; Surrey, England
- Disappeared: 10 September 1988 (aged 15); Sutton, England
- Status: Missing for 38 years, 1 month and 26 days
- Parents: Peter Boxell (father); Christine Boxell (mother)

Lee Darren Boxell is an English missing person who was last seen on 10 September 1988, after spending the morning with a friend in the Sutton area of London. He was 15 years old. He had mentioned the possibility of attending a football match at Selhurst Park. No confirmed sightings have been reported since, and his whereabouts remain unknown.

In later investigations, police suggested that Boxell may have died while attempting to intervene in an incident of sexual abuse at an unofficial youth club held at St Dunstan’s Church in Cheam. The venue was later linked to historic abuse, and renewed appeals prompted further witness testimony and excavation efforts. The case remains open and unsolved.

== Disappearance ==
Locations
1 Selhurst Park
2 ASDA Sutton High Street, Sutton (formerly Tesco)
3 St Dunstan's Church, Cheam

On the morning of Saturday, 10 September 1988, Boxell left his home in Cheam, in the London Borough of Sutton, to meet a friend at 11 am in the nearby town of Sutton. They spent a couple of hours window shopping and parted at 1 pm. As he was leaving, Boxell said he might go to Selhurst Park to watch the Charlton Athletic F.C. v Millwall F.C. match.

Despite extensive appeals on both the BBC's Crimewatch and at Selhurst Park and other football stadiums, no confirmed sightings of Boxell have been reported at any of the grounds. A witness did come forward to say they had spotted him outside a Tesco on Sutton High Street (now an Asda) at 2:20 pm. This made it unlikely that he could have reached any of the football grounds in time for a 3 pm kick-off. He has not been seen since.

== Subsequent events ==
From 2012 onwards, investigators developed a theory that Boxell might have attended an unofficial youth club in the annexe of St Dunstan's Church in Cheam, known as "The Shed", which had previously been unknown to the police. Following extensive inquiries, officers found that paedophiles were operating in the area at the time Boxell disappeared. William Lambert, the St Dunstan's graveyard digger who ran The Shed, was jailed for 11 years in 2011, when he was aged 75, after sexually abusing four girls who attended the club. Between June and September 2012, the police excavated part of the St Dunstan's graveyard. Digs resumed in April 2013.

In 2013, to coincide with what would have been Boxell's 40th birthday, Crimewatch featured another appeal for information, working on the theory that Boxell had attended The Shed on the day he disappeared. Following the appeal, an allegation of sexual abuse was reported for the first time, and police began working on the theory that "Lee may have died after intervening to try to stop sexual abuse at a youth club in Cheam".

In 2018, a Scotland Yard spokesman confirmed that cold case detectives had interviewed a potential witness, and new information was being investigated that could lead to Boxell's remains being found. The following year, Boxell was featured in a missing person campaign promoted by Italian football club AS Roma.

== Potential suspects ==
In 2001, links were suggested between Boxell's disappearance and the late Brian Lunn Field, a paedophile and serial sex offender who had recently been arrested for the 1968 murder of Roy Tutill. Tutill's body was found in woodland three days after his disappearance. He had been abducted from a street in Chessington, less than four miles from Sutton, where Boxell was last seen. Boxell's mother dismissed a link, stating that she believe Field was in prison from 1987 to 1990. However, this is inaccurate, as although Field was convicted at the start of June 1986 of the abduction of two boys in his car and given a four-year sentence, he only served half his sentence and was released in 1988 (the same year Boxell disappeared). Field is also suspected by police of being responsible for the abduction and murder of Patrick Warren and David Spencer, two boys who vanished from Solihull, West Midlands, in 1996 while Field was driving around in a van in the vicinity of where they were last seen. These boys have also never been found.

== See also ==
- List of people who disappeared mysteriously (1980s)
- Disappearance of Patrick Warren and David Spencer – the disappearance of two schoolboys in 1996 which is suspected to be the work of Brian Lunn Field, who has been linked to Boxell's disappearance
- Murder of Roy Tutill – involved the abduction of a 14-year-old schoolboy from the street less than 4 miles away from where Boxell was last seen, carried out by Brian Lunn Field who has also been linked to Boxell's disappearance
- Murder of Lindsay Rimer – unsolved 1994 case of a British child who disappeared from Yorkshire and was found one year later in a nearby canal
- Disappearance of Kevin Hicks - 1986 disappearance of a 16 year old boy from Croydon.
