= Disappearance of Kevin Hicks =

1986 unsolved disappearance in the UK

Kevin Hicks
- Born: 9 February 1970
- Disappeared: 2 March 1986 (aged 16); Addiscombe, Croydon, London
- Status: Missing for 40 years, 8 months and 7 days
- Occupation: Schoolboy

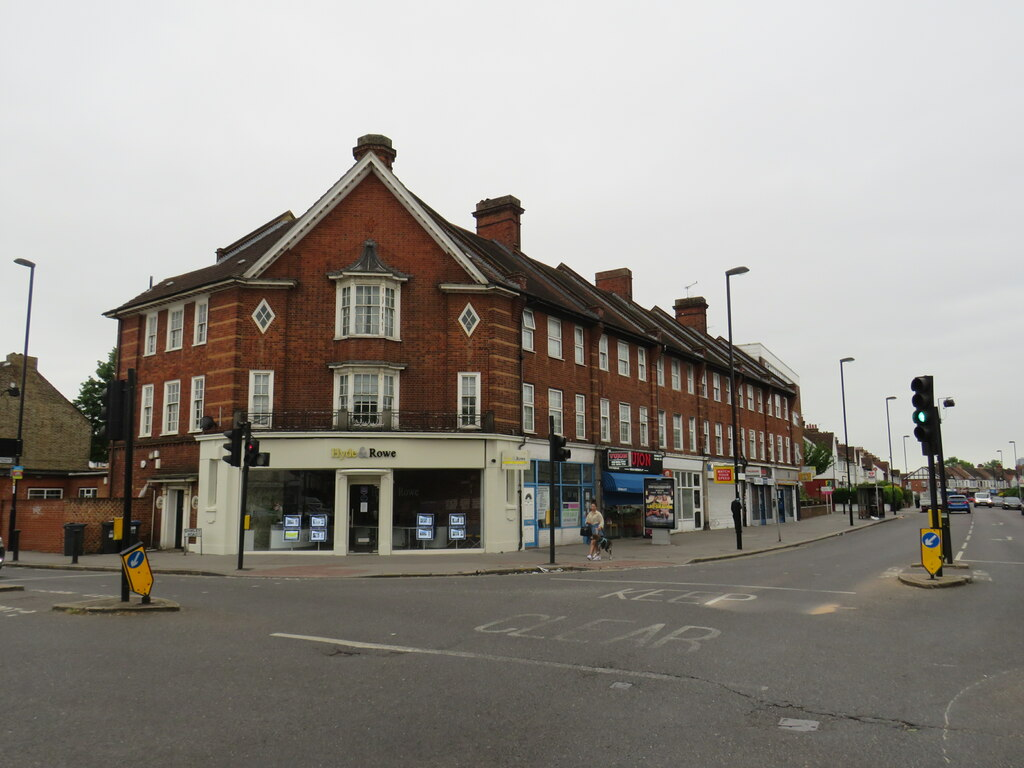
Parade of shops in Addiscombe, near Croydon - junction of Shirley Road and Lower Addiscombe Road

Locations
1 Shirley Road at the junction of Lower Addiscombe Road
2 10-10:15 sighting reported as by The Cricketers, 107 Addiscombe Road

Kevin Hicks (born 1970) is a British schoolboy who disappeared from Addiscombe, Croydon, on 2 March 1986. In 2016, the Metropolitan Police reclassified the case as a murder investigation.

== Disappearance ==
On 2 March 1986, Hicks left his home at 8:30 PM to buy eggs for a school project. He was last seen at 10:00 PM on Shirley Road, walking toward his home.

Following a 2016 review of the case, the Metropolitan Police reclassified the disappearance as a murder investigation and offered a £20,000 reward. Hicks' sister Alexandra supported the appeal, stating, "Someone somewhere knows something. It is time to let go of that secret."

== Investigation ==
In 2016, detectives revealed that Hicks may have been "groomed" by an adult prior to his disappearance and that his trip to the shops may have been a ruse to meet someone. A £20,000 reward remains in place for information.

== Aftermath ==
Hicks' parents, Derek and Terry, both died without discovering the truth behind their son's disappearance. Terry died of a brain tumor in October 1994, just days after making a televised appeal for information. Derek died in 2004, having lived in the same family home for 18 years in the hope that Kevin might return. Since their deaths, Kevin's sister Alexandra has been the sole family representative in the search for answers.

== See also ==
- Disappearance of Martin Allen – Unsolved 1979 case of 15-year-old who disappeared from London
- Disappearance of Lee Boxell – Unsolved 1988 disappearance of 15-year-old
- List of people who disappeared mysteriously (1980s)
- List of unsolved murders in the United Kingdom (1980s)
