= Killing of Inga Maria Hauser =

1988 unsolved killing in Northern Ireland

- Born: 28 May 1969
- Died: c. 6 April 1988 (aged 18)
- Body discovered: Ballypatrick Forest, near Ballycastle, County Antrim, Northern Ireland

On 6 April 1988, Inga Maria Hauser, an 18‑year‑old German backpacker, boarded the evening Galloway Princess ferry from Stranraer, Scotland, to Larne, Northern Ireland. She disappeared after the crossing, and her body was found two weeks later in a secluded part of Ballypatrick Forest, near Ballycastle, County Antrim.

The investigation recovered a male DNA profile that has never been identified, and extensive enquiries over many years included arrests, interviews and a large DNA screening, but no charges were brought. A memorial was later placed at the site where her body was found, and her killing was featured in the 2022 BBC Northern Ireland series Murder in the Badlands. An inquest was announced in 2024.

== Background ==
Inga Maria Hauser was born on 28 May 1969 in Munich, Germany, and was the younger daughter of Josef and Almut Hauser. She had an elder sister, Friederike. Before her death, Hauser had travelled through England and Scotland. Her journey included visits to London, Bath, Liverpool and Preston, before she continued north to Inverness and Glasgow, and then to Stranraer. Her diary records that she planned to go to Dublin after arriving in Larne, County Antrim, Northern Ireland, and then travel on to Wales to visit a friend. She had been sending postcards home during her trip.

== Disappearance and discovery ==
Locations of Hauser's last sighting and the forest where she was found, 40.8 miles apart
1 Port of Larne
2 Ballypatrick Forest

On 6 April 1988, Hauser boarded the 7 pm Galloway Princess ferry from Stranraer to Larne. She was last seen during the crossing. Her final diary entry, written during the journey, included the lines "Wonder where I stay tonight" and "Need more money." She was wearing baseball boots, a long flowing skirt, a jacket that may have been denim, and was carrying a large blue rucksack. A smaller bag was attached to the top of the rucksack, marked with a distinctive United States Air Force badge. Hauser's family became concerned when no further postcards arrived, and her friend in Wales later reported that she had not appeared for her planned visit. On 20 April, her body was found face down and partially clothed by a farmer in a secluded part of Ballypatrick Forest near Ballycastle. She died from a brain haemorrhage resulting from severe head and neck injuries. Police later said Hauser had been subjected to a "vicious and ruthless assault". A retired chief superintendent who was one of the first at the scene said he believed the attack had been sexually motivated and that she had died while trying to defend herself.

== Investigation ==
A male DNA profile was recovered from the crime scene but has never been identified, and police also sought to trace several women after a female profile from Hauser's body matched entries on the UK genetic database. One of the UK's largest DNA screenings, involving about 2,000 samples, was also carried out but did not produce a definitive match. A man living east of Ballymoney was reported to have had facial scratches soon after the killing, prompting local concern about possible involvement.

In May 2018, two men were arrested in Loughguile on suspicion of murder, and later released on bail. One of the men was released unconditionally in December 2018. In the same year, detectives said they believed a number of people may have been involved in the killing or in efforts to conceal it. A 60‑year‑old man, who had been one of those arrested in 2018, was questioned again in February 2019, while a 57‑year‑old woman was investigated for allegedly withholding information. Police sent a file on both suspects to the Public Prosecution Service in June 2019, and in July 2020 the PPS said the evidence "did not provide a reasonable prospect of conviction for any offence". In March 2026, two people came forward with information.

== Aftermath ==
Hauser's father died from cancer in 2006. A memorial stone was unveiled at Ballypatrick Forest in April 2018. Her mother died in 2019 after a long illness. In 2022, Hauser's killing was featured in the BBC Northern Ireland series Murder in the Badlands, and was later streamed on Netflix. Singer Keeley Moss has written a number of songs about Hauser and runs a blog about her.

== Inquest ==
In November 2024, an inquest into Hauser's killing was confirmed. In January 2025, a court hearing was told that an inquest into Hauser's death seemed to have been opened in September 1990. Coroner Joe McCrisken said it appeared to have ended without taking evidence or issuing a verdict, stating that the papers "simply can't be found". In May 2026, a pre‑inquest review hearing was told that two people previously interviewed in the case would be asked whether they wished to take part in the inquest.

== See also ==
- List of unsolved murders in the United Kingdom (1980s)
- Killing of Marian Beattie
