= Meriden Park =

Public park in Chelmsley Wood, West Midlands, England

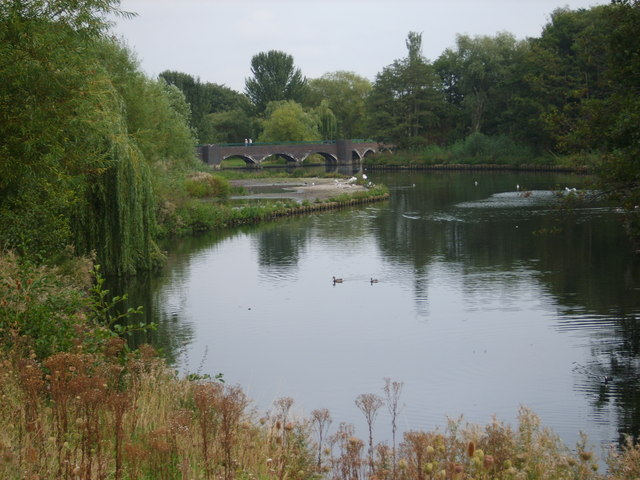
- The lake and footbridge at Meriden Park
- Interactive map of Meriden Park
- Location: Chelmsley Wood, West Midlands
- Nearest city: Birmingham
- Coordinates: 52°28′58″N 1°44′14″W
- Operator: Solihull Council
- Website: www.solihull.gov.uk/Resident/Leisure-parks/parks-and-open-spaces/parks/meriden-park

Meriden Park is a public park located in Chelmsley Wood, near Birmingham, UK.

The park has a large natural lake, natural woodland, a children's play area, a skate park and a football pitch.

It hosts a number of community events throughout the year.

Meriden Adventure Playground, sited in the park and operated by an independent charity, is one of the leading adventure play facilities in the country. It offers free, open access play to 0 - 16 year olds Tuesday to Friday after school and all day during holidays. Under fives must be accompanied.
