= Murder of Roy Tutill =

1968 murder of a schoolboy

Roy Tutill
- Born: Roy Linzee Tutill; 1954; Surrey, England, UK
- Died: 23 April 1968 (14 years); Leatherhead, Surrey, England, UK
- Cause of death: Strangulation
- Body discovered: Cherkley Court, Mickleham, Surrey, UK
- Parent(s): Dennis and Hilary Tutill

The murder of Roy Tutill occurred on 23 April 1968 in Surrey, England, United Kingdom. The victim was a 14-year-old schoolboy who was raped and murdered on his way home from school. The murder went unsolved for 33 years, until Brian Lunn Field confessed to the crime after DNA evidence surfaced in 2001. It was the oldest cold case to be solved in the United Kingdom until the unrelated conviction of David Burgess for the 1966 murder of Yolande Waddington in 2012.

== Murder ==
Roy Tutill, known as "Tuts" to his friends, disappeared on 23 April 1968 on his way from Kingston Grammar School in Kingston upon Thames, Greater London, to his home in Brockham. He left school at 3:30 p.m. and boarded a bus with his friends. To save on bus fare to buy a new bicycle, he then decided to hitchhike the rest of the way home, something he did regularly. Tutill was last seen in Chessington, trying to hail a car.

Tutill's parents, Dennis and Hilary, notified Surrey Police when he failed to arrive home that evening. The police took a missing person's report, but did not begin investigating until the following day. The body of the schoolboy was found by a policeman three days later outside the gates of Cherkley Court, in Mickleham. He had been strangled and sexually assaulted.

== Investigation ==
The only information police learned was that a bus driver had seen a schoolboy talking to a driver of a silver-grey Austin Westminster Mark II car. The driver was described as a "short, stocky man with whitish-grey hair." The same car had been reported seen near where the body was dumped. Samples taken from Tutill's body and clothing were analysed at the time, but provided no evidence except that the suspect was of either 'A' or 'O' blood group.

Scotland Yard was called in to assist in the investigation, but there were no breaks in the case. The investigation remained open and was regularly reviewed. Detectives, however, held the belief that the perpetrator was a repeat offender and the murder was not a random act. In the 1970s, investigators travelled to Scotland to interview a man named Brian Lunn Field from Solihull, West Midlands, who had been sentenced to two years in prison for the attempted abduction and indecent assault of a 14-year-old boy in Aberdeen.

In December 1996, a partial DNA sample was recovered from samples taken from Tutill's trousers, which had been kept in a freezer. In the late 1990s, a national review was held to investigate unsolved murders and see if any could be traced to current convicts or other crimes. Investigators in the Tutill case became aware of assaults of two young boys in Scotland. They were not able to locate Field, who had last been heard of in the 1980s.

In 2000, a match was made of the DNA sample from the Tutill case that was matched to Field, who had DNA taken when arrested for drunk driving in September 1999 in Birmingham. Field had been working as a gardener and not paying any taxes. Surrey Police set up surveillance on Field in Birmingham. His criminal record included a 1969 fine for gross indecency, the 1970s assault in Aberdeen, and two sentences in the 1980s of four years each for two counts of unlawful sex with underage boys and falsely imprisoning two teenage boys.

== Arrest and confession ==
On 21 February 2001, police arrested Field at his flat in Birmingham. He was held in police custody during which time his detention was extended for more than the initial 24 hours in order to assist the investigation. Field denied knowing Tutill or having anything to do with his death, and while admitting to his historic sexual offences against boys said he had put that behaviour behind him. Just before Field was put into his cell for a third night he had been asked to submit DNA samples.

Field could not sleep that night, and the following day he confessed in detail to the abduction, rape and murder of Tutill. He said he had seen the boy get off a bus and thumb for a lift, and that he had picked him up. He then drove the boy to a layby where he anally raped him over the front seat and, when he finished, panicked. Field drove to a second layby and strangled Tutill by wrapping a rope around his neck twice. He kept the boy's body in his car's boot for several days before dumping him in woodland.

== Sentence ==
On 15 November 2001, 65-year-old Field was sentenced to life in prison for the murder of Tutill. He pleaded guilty to murder, but not sexual assault. Tutill's parents did not live to see his murderer sentenced. Until Field was convicted, Tutill's murder had been the only unsolved child murder case in Surrey.

Field died in prison in February 2024, aged 87.

== See also ==
- List of solved missing person cases (1950–1969)
- Disappearance of Patrick Warren and David Spencer – another case that is believed to be the work of Field
- Disappearance of Lee Boxell – another case that has been linked to Field. Schoolboy Lee Boxell vanished from the street in Sutton in 1988, less than four miles from where Tutill was abducted
