= 2019 in Scotland =

- Centuries: 19th; 20th; 21st
- Decades: 1990s; 2000s; 2010s; 2020s
- See also: List of years in Scotland; Timeline of Scottish history 2019 in: The UK • England • Wales • Elsewhere; Scottish football: 2018–19 • 2019–20; 2019 in Scottish television

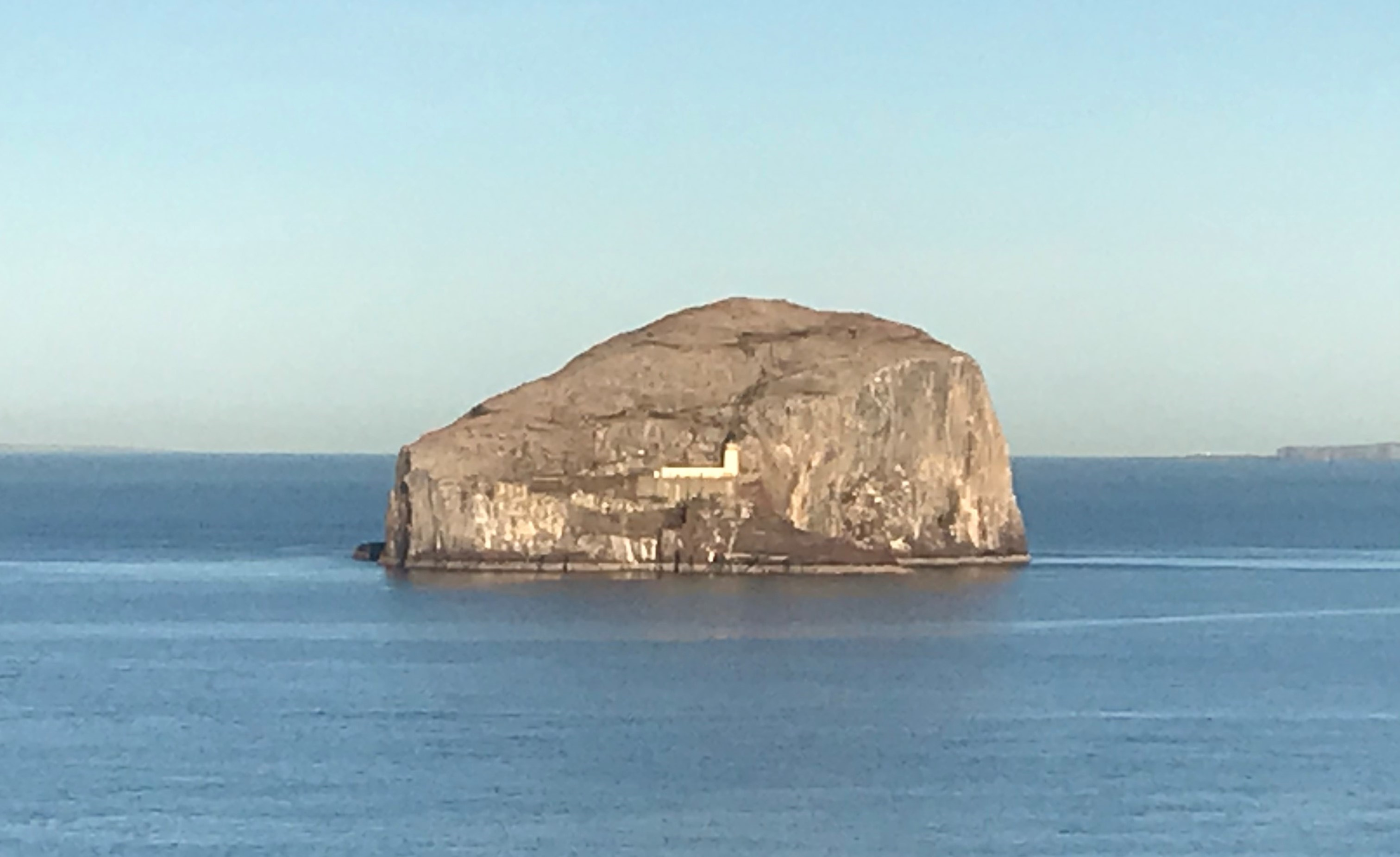
Bass Rock, 2019

Events from the year 2019 in Scotland.

== Incumbents ==
- First Minister – Nicola Sturgeon
- Secretary of State for Scotland
  - David Mundell (until 24 July 2019)
  - Alister Jack

== Events ==
- 2 January – Abellio ScotRail announces average rail fare increases of 2.8%, lower than the average 3.1% increase announced for England and Wales.
- 24 January – Former Scottish First Minister Alex Salmond is arrested and charged with multiple counts of sexual assault and two charges of attempted rape.
- 19 February – The youth was found guilty through a unanimous verdict for the abduction, rape and murder of six-year-old Alesha MacPhail on the 2 July 2018. Lord Matthews described the events as "committing some of the most wicked and evil crimes this court has ever heard of in decades of dealing with depravity." The judge also agreed to reverse the naming restriction due to the ‘unique’ nature of the case - the first in Scottish history - and the defendant is named as 16-year-old Aaron Campbell.
- 24 February – The new BBC Scotland channel has five of the top ten most-watched programmes across Scotland on its Sunday launch night.
- 19 March – Scotland's unemployment rate is reported to have fallen to a new record low of 3.4% between November and January, well below the UK average of 3.9%.
- 20 March – The Scottish economy grew by 0.3% in the final three months of 2018 compared to a figure of 0.2% for the UK as a whole.
- 21 March – Aaron Campbell was sentenced to life imprisonment with a minimum term of 27 years for the murder of six-year-old Alesha MacPhail. Lord Matthews said Campbell's crime had caused "revulsion and disbelief" and described Campbell as a "cold, callous, calculating, remorseless and dangerous individual".
- 29 March – The final episode of the popular sitcom Still Game is broadcast on BBC Scotland.
- 1 April – New legislation known as Frank's Law – extending free personal care to under-65s living with disabilities and degenerative conditions – has come into effect.
- 23 May – 2019 European Parliament election in the United Kingdom is held. Results are announced on 27 May after the polls close in all EU member states. In the Scotland constituency, the Scottish National Party wins the popular vote with 594,553 votes and has the highest share of the vote with 37.8%, finishing in sixth place overall and returning 3 MEPs.
- 6 June – Natalie McGarry, former SNP MP for Glasgow East is jailed for 18 months having earlier pleaded guilty to charges of embezzlement. In total, she stole more than £25,000, including donations for a local food bank, spending the funds on rent and a holiday in Spain.
- 16–28 July – Scotland hosted the 2019 UEFA Women's Under-19 Championship.
- 12 October – Plastic-stemmed cotton buds are prohibited in Scotland.
- 3 November – Scottish Conservative MP Ross Thomson announces he will not stand for re-election following claims by Scottish Labour MP Paul Sweeney of 'groping' in the Palace of Westminster.
- 12 December – At the 2019 UK general election, the Scottish National Party wins a landslide in Scotland, winning 48 of the 59 seats. Their victory is not as large as it was in 2015, but the Scottish Lib Dems replace Scottish Labour as the third party, pushing Labour into fourth place with one seat. Jo Swinson, Leader of the Liberal Democrats, loses her East Dunbartonshire UK Parliament constituency seat to Amy Callaghan of the Scottish National Party by 150 votes.
- 18 December – Michael Matheson, Scottish Government Cabinet Secretary for Transport, Infrastructure and Connectivity, announces that it will exercise a break clause in the Abellio ScotRail railway passenger service franchise in March 2022.
- 28 December – Highest ever maximum temperature for December in the UK, 18.7 °C, recorded at Achfary in the Highlands.

== Deaths ==
- 1 January – Freddie Glidden, 91, footballer (Hearts, Dumbarton).
- 19 January – Ted McKenna, 68, drummer (The Sensational Alex Harvey Band).
- 22 January – Andrew Fairlie, 55, chef.
- 24 January – Hugh McIlvanney, 84, sports writer (The Sunday Times).
- 10 March – Angus Sinclair, 73, serial killer.
- 16 November – John Campbell Brown, 72, Astronomer Royal for Scotland (since 1995).

== See also ==
- 2019 in England
- 2019 in Northern Ireland
- 2019 in Wales
