= Murder of Carol Lannen =

Unsolved 1979 murder in Scotland

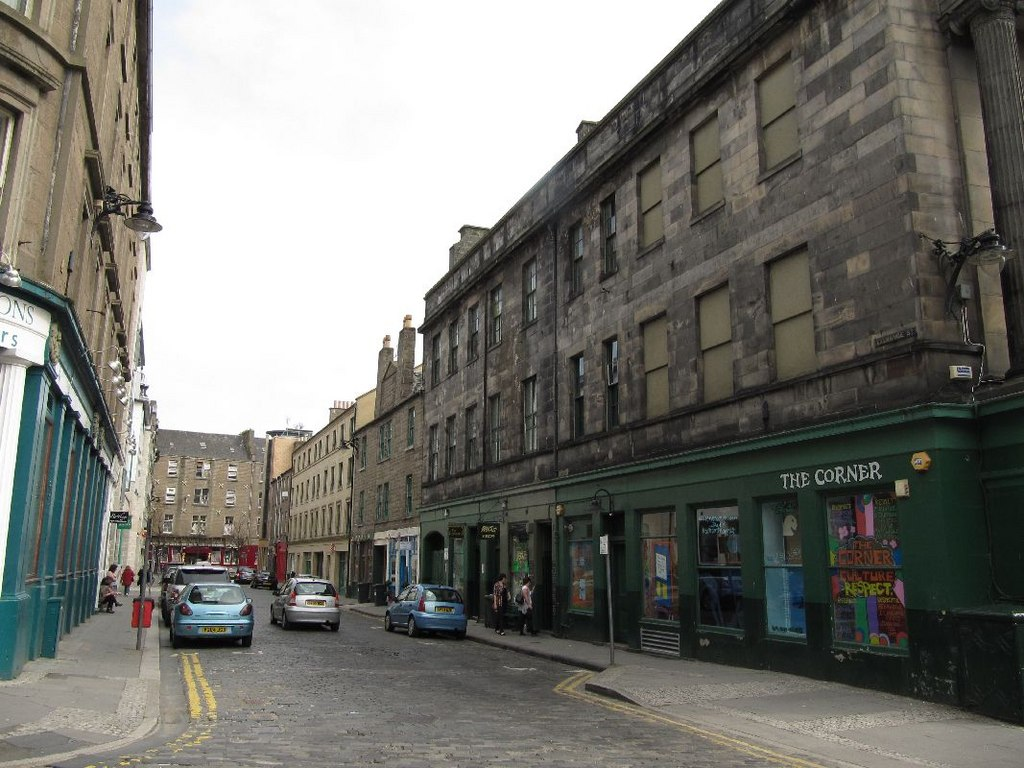
- Lannen (left) and Exchange Street, Dundee, (right) where Lannen disappeared from

- The locations where Lannen and McCabe were last seen in Dundee, and the locations they were both found dead
- Date: 20 March 1979
- Attack type: Strangulation
- Deaths: 1
- Accused: Angus Sinclair; Andrew Hunter

Police photofit of the taxi driver seen with Carol Lannen before she disappeared

The murder of Carol Lannen took place in 1979 with her body found in Templeton Woods near Dundee, Scotland. Only 11 months later Elizabeth McCabe was found dead only 150 yards away at the same entrance in the same forest.

== Background ==
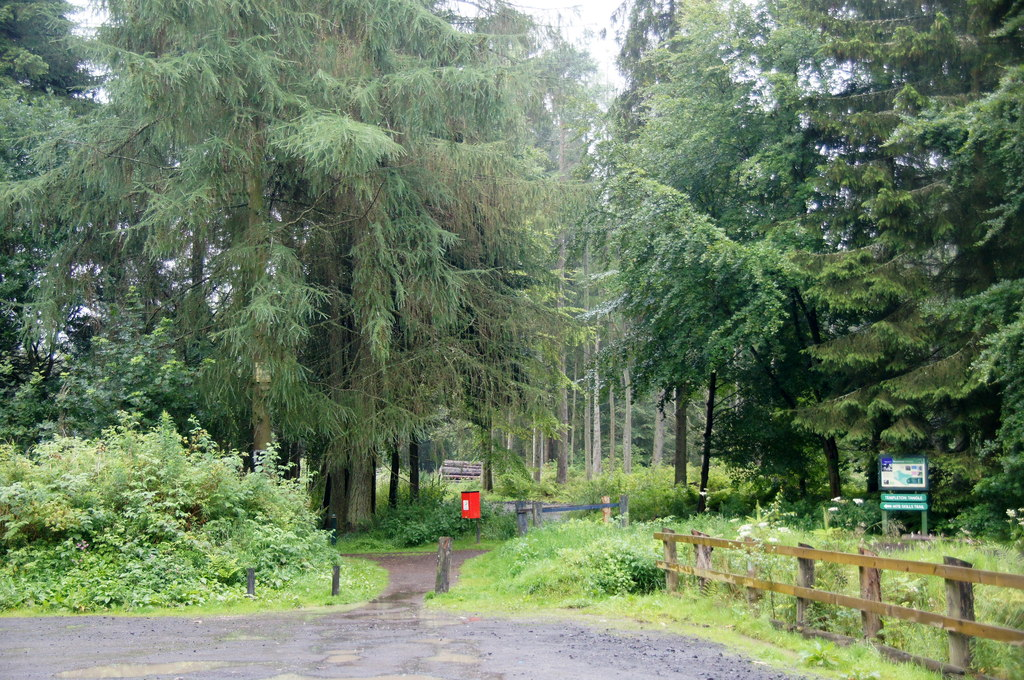
the entrance to Templeton Woods where Lannen's body was found.

18-year-old Dundee prostitute Carol Lannen was found in Templeton Woods in March 1979 after last being seen getting into what was believed to be a Ford Cortina estate car taxi in Exchange Street, the city's red light district, at 8pm on 20 March 1979. She had earlier been picked up from her home in Hill Street and taken by taxi to the centre of the city by Commercial Street, but this taxi driver was never traced. Just like McCabe, she was strangled to death and found naked, and taxi drivers were also the key focus of the Lannen murder inquiry. Both had also last been seen in the centre of the city. The murder led to fears that there was a serial killer at large in the city at the time, and the two cases became known as the "Templeton Woods murders". However, investigators at the time were said to be keeping an open mind on whether the same person killed both women.

11 days after Lannen was found dead, her handbag was mysteriously found at a remote location on the banks of the River Don in Aberdeenshire, 85 miles away from Dundee. Police therefore believe that the killer had a connection to this area.

== Cold case inquiries ==
In 1996, Tayside Police ordered a new review to take place of the murders of Carol Lannen and Elizabeth McCabe, following the reopening of the Bible John case in Glasgow.

In 2004, detectives from three police forces in Scotland announced that there were "strong links" between the then-unsolved murders of seven young women, including the murders of Lannen and McCabe and the World's End murders. These murders were investigated under Operation Trinity, and serial killer Angus Sinclair was identified as the prime suspect in all of the murders. Sinclair was subsequently convicted of the World's End Murders on DNA evidence and remains the prime suspect in three of the other murders: that of Anna Kenny, Hilda McAuley and Agnes Cooney in Glasgow during 1977. However, it was discovered that Sinclair definitely could not have committed the murders of Lannen and McCabe, since prison records show that he was imprisoned when both of the murders occurred.

In 2004, police linked to the murders of Lannen and McCabe together with five murders across Scotland as part of Operation Trinity, although police subsequently announced that the Templeton Woods murders were not linked to the other five cases and said in 2005 that there was no evidence to link the murders of Lannen and McCabe at that stage.

Investigators subsequently ruled out a link between the Templeton Woods murders and the five other cases, and also ruled out a link between the murders of Lannen and McCabe themselves.

== Media ==
External videos
- In the Footsteps of Killers series 2 episode 1

In 2004, both the Lannen and McCabe cases featured on the STV documentary series Unsolved, which focused on some of Scotland's most notorious unsolved murders. In 2023, Channel 4 documentary In the Footsteps of Killers concurred with author of The Law Killers Alexander McGregor, that convicted wife murderer (who later died in prison) Andrew Hunter worked with Lannen and may have murdered her as he had strangled his second wife. Hunter also drove a red Ford Cortina.
