= Murder of Elizabeth McCabe =

1980 murder case in Scotland

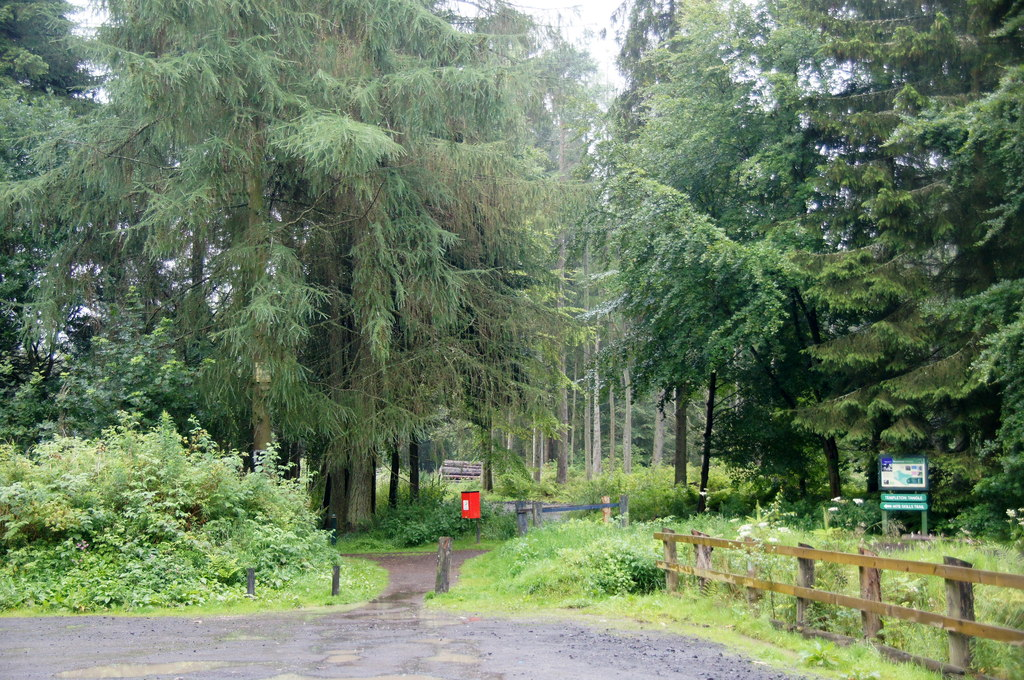
- McCabe (left) and the entrance to Templeton Woods (right) where McCabe (and Lannen's) body was found
- Date: 11 February 1980
- Time: Approx. 1:00am
- Location: Templeton Woods, Dundee (location body found); 56.49495°N 3.04012°W
- Cause: Strangulation
- Accused: Angus Sinclair; Vincent Simpson

Murder of Elizabeth McCabe (Dundee City council area)

The February 1980 murder of Elizabeth McCabe in Dundee, Scotland is one of Scotland's most notorious unsolved murders, and led to one of Scotland's largest manhunts. McCabe had disappeared after a night out at Teazer's Disco in Dundee city centre, and was found strangled to death two weeks later in Templeton Woods on the outskirts of the city. This was only 11 months after another woman, 18-year-old Carol Lannen, had been found dead only 150 yards away in the same woods, leading to the killings being labelled the Templeton Woods murders in the press and causing many to fear that there was a serial killer at large in the city at the time, although police have not linked the murders.

The case was re-opened with advances in DNA profiling in 2004, and was briefly one of seven cases officially linked to serial killer Angus Sinclair as part of an inquiry named Operation Trinity, before Sinclair was conclusively eliminated from the cases. However, a taxi driver and criminal who had been a suspect in the original McCabe inquiry and who admitted to being a "peeping Tom" in Templeton Woods was tried for the murder in 2007, after it was heard that DNA was found on exhibits that had only a 1 in 40 million chance of belonging to anyone else. He also admitted being in the woods that night. However, he was found not guilty by a majority decision at the conclusion of the trial. Afterwards, police said they were not looking for anyone else in connection with the murder.

In 2004, both the Lannen and McCabe cases featured on the STV documentary series Unsolved, which focused on some of Scotland's most notorious unsolved murders.

== Murder ==
Elizabeth McCabe was a 20-year-old trainee nursery nurse who was described as quiet and shy. She rarely drank or went on nights out, until about three or four months before her murder. On Sunday 10 February 1980 she left her home in Lyndhurst Avenue, Lochee for a night out with friends. They went to several pubs but eventually ended up at Teazer's Disco in Union Street, Dundee. Her friend Sandra Niven said McCabe had been crying in the disco toilet that night because she thought no one liked her. Niven said that at the end of the night at around 12:30 am the pair became separated as they were leaving, and she had expected to find McCabe at the entrance of the nightclub waiting for her but she was not. Niven looked for her and checked a nearby taxi rank, but couldn't find her friend and assumed she had gone off on her own. Her mother later said that she would normally have taken a bus or a taxi home after a night out.

Three months before this, McCabe had got into a car that she had mistaken for a taxi after a night out. She had been mistaken for a prostitute by a man who had approached her for sex shortly before she disappeared, something which she had joked about with Niven the very weekend she vanished from the nightclub.

McCabe failed to return home that night and her parents were immediately concerned, since it was out of character for her and as she had work the next day. 24 hours later her mother reported her missing, in the mistaken belief that she had to wait this amount of time before she could do so. It was believed that McCabe had attempted to get home by taking a taxi, since at that time of night she would not have been able to get to her home in Lochee by any other means.

16 days after she disappeared, McCabe's naked dead body was found in a small clearing in Templeton Woods on the outskirts of the city by two men hunting rabbits with their dogs. She was found with a dark blue jumper draped over her shoulders. A pile of branches had been placed on top of her in an attempt to conceal the body. A post-mortem revealed that McCabe had died from asphyxia caused by compression of her neck. A professor who was asked to review the evidence again when the case was re-opened in 2005 concluded that her death would have been quite sudden due to vagal inhibition in her neck, and that she had possibly been killed during a struggle or during a sex act.

Between the time McCabe disappeared and late February, some of McCabe's clothing was found at Coupar Angus Road in the city, near the Kingsway. Two months after the murder, on 2 April 1980, McCabe's jewellery and a photo belonging to her were also found in Cobden Street. Some weeks later her shoes were also found in this location.

== Investigation ==
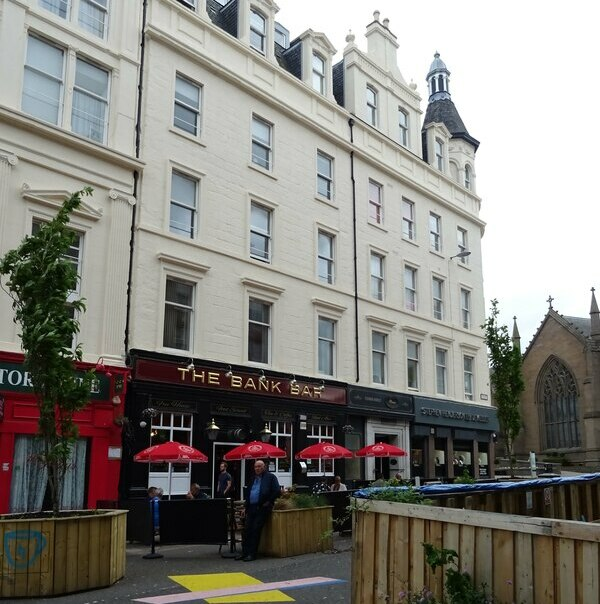
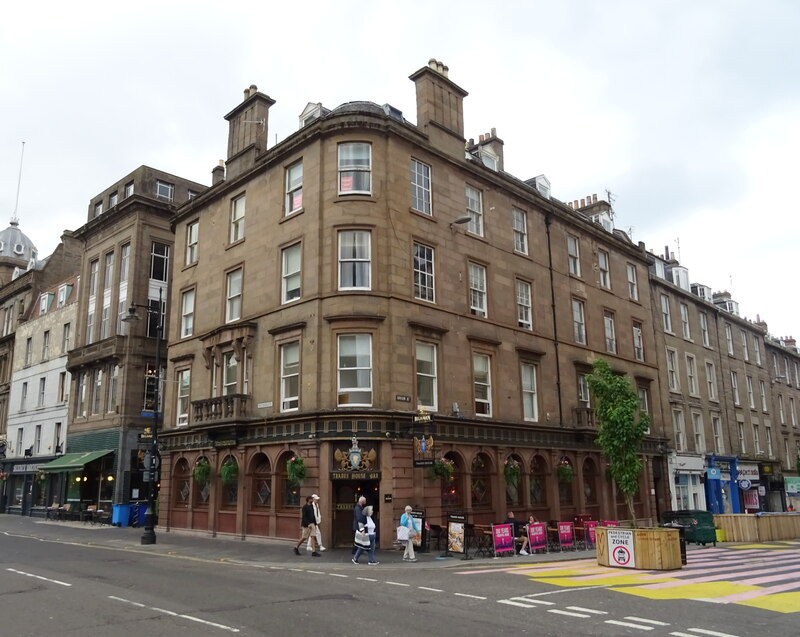
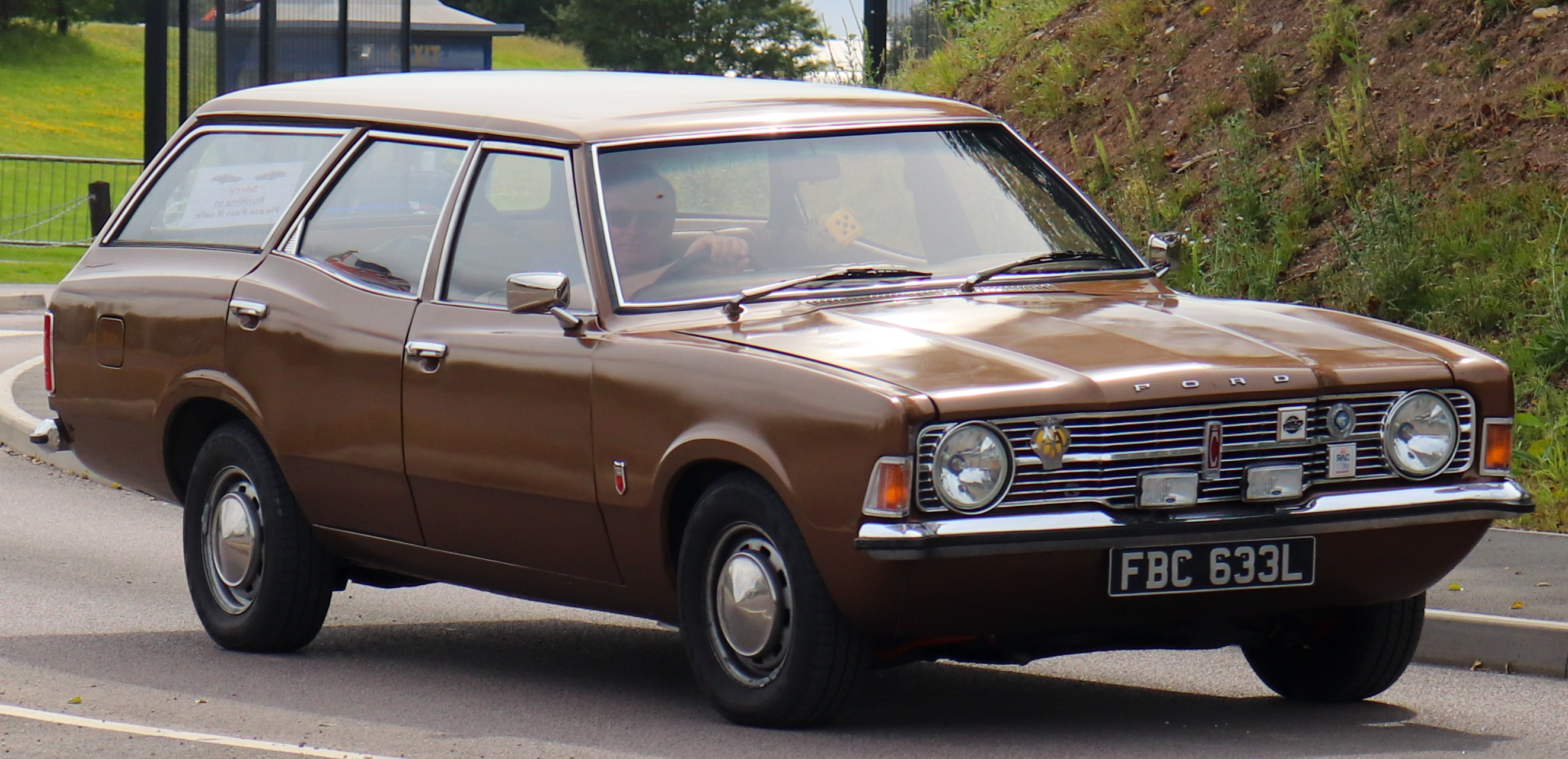
McCabe vanished after leaving the Teazer's club in Union Street (now the Bank Bar, seen in the first image). It is opposite what is now the Trades House Bar (second image). Ford Cortina estate mark III was sighted but was one of the most common cars at the time.

Two witnesses reported seeing a Ford Cortina with a taxi sign on it emerge from a road which led to Templeton Woods on the night McCabe disappeared. They reported that the driver appeared to be alone in the car with the interior lights on, and that he appeared to be driving with his wrists, as if he had dirty hands and didn't want to touch the steering wheel. The two witnesses reported that this was the taxi of Vincent Simpson, who ran a local taxi company in Newtyle near Dundee. He drove a Ford Cortina taxi at that time. As a result, Simpson was questioned by police, and admitted being in the woods on the night McCabe disappeared, claiming he had taken his dog for a walk there at about 10:00 p.m. and saying he had returned to the woods after midnight on his way to collect a fare in Dundee. He claimed in a statement that he had gone back to try to steal from a car he had seen in the woods before. Simpson had a criminal record dating back to when he was a child and was a heavy gambling addict. When shown a picture of McCabe he claimed he did not recognise her. He protested that he did not have any convictions for violence or sexual crimes, but in an interview on 3 March 1980 he admitted to being a "peeping tom" who used binoculars to spy on courting couples in Templeton Woods. He also reportedly admitted to other "unpleasant and embarrassing" things in interviews.

Despite a large and widely publicised manhunt for the killer, police failed to charge anyone with the murder of McCabe and late into 1980 the investigation was wound down, but left open.

== Cold case inquiries ==
In 1996, Tayside Police ordered a new review to take place of the murders of Elizabeth McCabe and Carol Lannen, following the reopening of the Bible John case in Glasgow. In 2004, detectives from three police forces in Scotland announced that there were "strong links" between the then-unsolved murders of seven young women, including the murders of McCabe and Lannen and the World's End murders. These murders were investigated under Operation Trinity, and serial killer Angus Sinclair was identified as the prime suspect in all of the murders. Sinclair was subsequently convicted of the World's End Murders on DNA evidence and remains the prime suspect in three of the other murders: that of Anna Kenny, Hilda McAuley and Agnes Cooney in Glasgow during 1977. However, it was discovered that Sinclair definitely could not have committed the murders of Lannen and McCabe, since prison records show that he was imprisoned when both of the murders occurred.

Investigators subsequently ruled out a link between the Templeton Woods murders and the five other cases, and also ruled out a link between the murders of Lannen and McCabe themselves.

The reinvestigations of 2004 led to the McCabe case being re-opened, and with advancements in DNA profiling (which had not yet been discovered at the time of the murder), items in the McCabe murder case were sent for DNA analysis in 2004. New public appeals were also made, which led to two notable calls from the public regarding the concerning behaviour of an unknown taxi driver who operated in the area at the time in 1980. In 2005 police arrested Vincent Simpson, the taxi driver who had been a suspect in the original investigation, at his home in Camberley, Surrey. He was charged with the murder in 2005 and sent for trial in 2007.

== Trial of Vincent Simpson ==
Vincent Simpson
- Simpson in 2013
- Born: 1945 or 1946 (age 79-80); Camberley, Surrey
- Other name: Vinny
- Occupation: Window cleaner
- Known for: Acquittal for one of Scotland's most notorious unsolved murders
- Spouse: Gillian Simpson
- Children: 3
- Convictions: Acquitted of McCabe murder, previous convictions for larceny (1967), going equipped to steal (1970), theft (1974), burglary and theft (1977), fraud and making false statement to police (1981)
- Comments: Found not guilty of McCabe murder, 2007

Simpson's trial began in October 2007 in Edinburgh. Simpson had several previous convictions, mostly for dishonesty and petty crime, having been convicted of larceny in 1967, going equipped to steal in 1970, theft in 1974, burglary and theft in 1977, and fraud and making a false statement to police in 1981. However, the jury did not hear of these previous convictions as Scottish law prevents previous convictions being heard in court. The defence had attempted to get the case against Simpson thrown out in the early stages, but were unsuccessful. They had claimed he could not receive a fair trial due to the fact that some witnesses from the time had either died or could not be traced and because some documents and items were missing, while also saying that prosecuting him would "breach his human rights". The judge rejected these claims, saying that while the passage of time since the murder had caused some disadvantage, he was not convinced that any trial would not be fair. Simpson also faced two other charges of breach of the peace, on the grounds that he had approached women in Dundee at around the same time as the murder and caused them distress and alarm.

At the trial it was heard that DNA found on the jumper draped over McCabe where she was dumped very likely came from Simpson.

Swabs taken from three different parts of the jumper all matched the DNA profile of Simpson. The chances of the DNA found on the right hand side of the jumper's neck coming from someone other than Simpson were estimated at 1 in 320,000. The chances of the DNA from the back of the jumper coming from anyone other than Simpson were 1 in 105,000. A hair found on the black plastic sheeting used to transfer McCabe's body to the mortuary in 1980 was also found to match Simpson's DNA, with the test indicating the chances of it not belonging to him were 1 in 1,300.

Together, the combined odds of the DNA coming from someone unrelated to Simpson were 1 in 40 million, and Jonathan Whittaker who conducted the DNA tests testified under oath: "In my opinion, these DNA profile results provide extremely strong support for the assertion that the DNA recovered from the hair and blue jumper has originated from Vincent Simpson". On the DNA from the jumper's neck, Whittaker said: "This result is of particular significance since the DNA profile result is what I would expect to find if Vincent Simpson had grabbed the jumper in the area of the neck, thus transferring his DNA to this area".

Simpson, who was described as always smartly dressed and well-groomed, refused to give evidence at the trial. However, his defence argued that the DNA evidence must have been contaminated. The defence alleged that the fact that the hair found that matched Simpson's DNA had not been found in an earlier examination of the sheet in 2003 was significant. The defence claimed the DNA also was tainted because there were (at that time) only around three labs in the world that were advanced enough to carry out the techniques used to analyse the evidence, meaning it was difficult to check the results. The defence asserted that police had wrongly focused on taxi drivers, claiming that they had done so because they feared that McCabe's killer had also killed Carol Lannen and that police wrongly feared a serial killer was on the loose (police had actually never linked the murders and had previously said that there was no apparent connection).

Detectives denied at trial that they had ignored other possible suspects, saying that "the investigation was led by the evidence" and "there comes a time when the evidence points to an individual, not police bias". Simpson himself claimed to have an alibi, saying he was either at home, ferrying fares around the Dundee area or at a local casino when the murder happened. However, police revealed that they had questioned the casino doorman at the time and the man told them he hadn't remembered seeing Simpson that night, and the casino doorman also testified at trial that Simpson had in fact phoned to pressurise him into claiming to police that he had been there at 1am that night. The doorman responded to Simpson by saying that he could not do so as he did not know him and could not remember seeing him. At trial the detectives on the case denied there had been contamination, with retired Detective Inspector Ian Kennedy saying that police took every step to ensure this didn't happen. On a video shown to the jury of detectives examining evidence, Kennedy said that "my recollection of that exercise was that we took every possible step to make sure there was no chance of contamination". He added that contamination was also not necessarily a problem, if the source of the contamination was known.

The jury were shown a video of Simpson in a police interview after he was arrested, in which he said that the DNA evidence was "tainted" but replied when he was asked if he was accusing police of planting evidence: "It doesn't happen, does it?"

At the end of the trial, the judge told the jury that they must not convict Simpson on the basis of DNA evidence alone. Subsequently, the jury found 61-year-old Simpson not guilty by a majority verdict in December 2007.

McCabe's mother and other family members had attended the trial almost every day and were reported to have been distressed by the verdict, with Ally Reid of Tayside Police commenting: "Elizabeth's family are understandably disappointed at today's verdict... they understand and support the reasons behind the re-investigation of Elizabeth's death, and appreciate the efforts of those involved in bringing the matter to court". Detective Chief Inspector Ewen West said that he was disappointed for the McCabe family at the verdict.

== Aftermath ==
The BBC reported after that the trial that "There now seems little hope of closure for the McCabe family, or for Templeton Woods to shed its association with unsolved murder." Despite the defence questioning the reliability of the DNA evidence, the Crown publicly defended the decision to prosecute Simpson and said that there was sufficient evidence to prosecute him. After the verdict, police said that they were not looking for anyone else in the case.

Tayside Police continued to separately appeal for information on the murder of Carol Lannen in 2008, with police believing members of the public hold information key to solving the case.

After the law on double jeopardy was changed in Scotland in 2011, allowing previously acquitted suspects to be re-tried if new evidence materialised, the McCabe case was subject to a new review. In 2013, Simpson, who had returned to living in Camberley and working as a window cleaner, spoke to the Daily Record, saying he did not fear the new investigation into the murder and saying "the cold case will go on and on. The police have got no avenues to go down". He also revealed that he had been back at the court he was cleared at to watch trials from the public gallery.

In 2020, a senior investigator on the McCabe case told STV News that the murders of McCabe and Lannen could still be solved, although police said that there was no plan to re-investigate the case.

== Notoriety of case ==
The BBC described the McCabe case in 2007 as one of Scotland's most notorious unsolved murders. The murders of Carol Lannen and Elizabeth McCabe started one of Scotland's biggest ever manhunts. In 2004 the Templeton Woods murders were the subject of an episode of the documentary series Unsolved, which investigated some of Scotland's most high-profile unsolved murders at that time. The trial of Simpson made front-page news in Scotland. In 2023, both cases were the subjects of Series 2, Episode 1 of In the Footsteps of Killers on Channel 4.
