= Murder of Renee and Andrew MacRae =

1976 solved Scottish missing persons case

Renee MacRae
- Born: Christina Catherine MacDonald; February 1940; Inverness, Scotland, UK
- Died: c. 12 November 1976 (aged 36)
- Spouse: Gordon MacRae (estranged at the time of death)
- Children: Gordon, Jr.; Andrew

Renee MacRae (born Christina Catherine MacDonald, February 1940) was a Scottish woman who disappeared on 12 November 1976, together with her 3-year-old son Andrew. Their case was the United Kingdom's longest-running missing persons case, and within Scotland is as notorious as Glasgow's Bible John murders. In September 2022, William (Bill) MacDowell was found guilty of the murder of MacRae and her son. Their bodies have never been found.

== Disappearance ==
Renee MacRae lived in Inverness and was married to Gordon MacRae, though the couple were separated. She had two sons, 9-year-old Gordon and 3-year-old Andrew. On Friday 12 November 1976 MacRae left her home in Cradlehall with both her sons. She dropped elder son Gordon at her estranged husband's house and turned south on to the A9, in the direction of Perth, apparently to visit her sister in Kilmarnock. Neither MacRae nor Andrew have ever been seen again. Later the same night, twelve miles away, a train driver spotted MacRae's burning BMW in an isolated lay-by on the A9. When the police reached the vehicle, it was charred and empty apart from a rug stained with blood matching MacRae's blood type.

Despite an extensive search, no further trace of Renee and Andrew MacRae was found, and it was concluded that they had been murdered and their bodies hidden. Witnesses on the A9 reported seeing a man dragging something they thought was a dead sheep not far from the car. MacRae was reported to have been wearing a sheepskin coat when she disappeared. Reports also placed a man with a pushchair near Dalmagarry quarry.

As police investigated, it became apparent that MacRae's personal life was not straightforward. Around 1971, unbeknownst to her husband, MacRae began to have an affair with William (Bill) MacDowell, who was married with two children and worked for Gordon MacRae as an accountant and company secretary. Nobody knew about the affair except Valerie Steventon, MacRae's best friend. Steventon revealed that MacRae had not been planning to visit her sister that night, but had intended to travel to Perthshire to visit MacDowell, Andrew's biological father. MacRae had first confided to her friend about her conducting an affair in the spring of 1973, when she had been pregnant with Andrew. According to Steventon, "Renee was completely besotted by Bill", and he had told her that he had a job with Texaco in Shetland and had found a house where they could live. According to Steventon, however, these details "turned out to be a pack of lies." MacDowell admitted their affair but denied any involvement in their disappearance. Eight days following, he was interviewed by journalist Stuart Lindsay and claimed that MacRae had called him twice since she went missing. When asked why he had not told the police this, he replied that it had "slipped his mind".

== Investigation ==
The revelation of MacRae's four-year affair with MacDowell led senior officers to admit that the case was "mired in a sea of deceit and untruthfulness from its start." Detective Sergeant John Cathcart coordinated the search and after eight months he had a breakthrough. While excavating Dalmagarry quarry he was hit by a stench after removing a layer of topsoil. Convinced it was a sign of corpses, Cathcart continued digging, but was told by a superior officer to stop as the bulldozer they were using had to go back to the contractors due to short funds.

The inquiry was wound down two years later. However, a 2004 Grampian Television documentary, Unsolved, screened throughout Scotland, renewed interest in the case and the investigation was reopened. In 2004, Chief Constable Ian Latimer launched a cold case review, which led to £122,000 being spent on an excavation of Dalmagarry quarry in August. Over the course of three weeks, 20,000 tons of earth from the quarry had been excavated and 2,000 trees were removed. All that was found were two crisp packets, some men's clothing and rabbit bones. As of August 2006, £250,000 has been spent re-investigating the case.

In recent years speculation has focused on the bodies having been buried under the A9, which was in the middle of a major programme of upgrading at the time of the disappearance. However, a spokeswoman for Northern Constabulary said that after studying aerial photographs taken by the Royal Air Force during the construction of the A9, they were satisfied the bodies were not buried under the road.

On 2 October 2018 it was reported that Leanach quarry, near to Culloden Battlefield, was being searched by Police Scotland in relation to the case.

During the investigation, police investigated a total of 123 possible sightings of Renee or Andrew, including a similar woman and child seen with a man with a handlebar moustache. All of these were followed up on and eliminated.

== Suspect ==
Northern Constabulary named a suspect in a report to the Crown Office and Procurator Fiscal Service in October 2006, but the Crown Office declared there was insufficient evidence to go to court. MacDowell had always been reluctant to speak to the media in the decades since the disappearance, but broke his silence in a 2004 interview and insisted that he did not kill MacRae. A week after the disappearance, MacDowell walked into Inverness police headquarters to make a voluntary statement, but his wife dragged him out of the building and nothing was said ever again.

More than forty years after the disappearance, further details emerged of a suspect who had fled to the US the day after being interviewed by police. James Taylor claimed that his late friend Sandy Thompson, a senior officer who worked closely with MacRae's contacts and had carried out fieldwork investigating the case, had been sure MacRae was murdered and buried on the A9 near a flyover. Taylor reported his concerns to Police Scotland following an appeal for information to mark the 40th anniversary of the case, claiming that Thompson spoke to a foreman in the roads department who had said someone had dug up a section of the road on the day Renee disappeared. There was one man he spoke to about the road and he showed him the evidence they had gathered. Taylor recalled: "Sandy said he knew right away when the man looked at it that the woman was dead, that was where she was buried and this man knew far more about it than he was telling." The man fled to the US the next day before returning to Scotland after the case had gone cold.

In September 2019, William MacDowell was charged with the murders of Renee and Andrew MacRae and of attempting to pervert the course of justice. Statements were read from witnesses in the case who had since died, including a man named Dennis Tyronney, who had told police that MacDowell had offered him £500 to kill Renee and Andrew MacRae in an acid attack. The trial also heard that MacDowell had removed and burnt the boot floor from his Volvo two days after the disappearance. In September 2022 he was found guilty of both murders and was sentenced to a minimum of 30 years in prison. However, he died on 15 February 2023, less than six months into his sentence, without ever admitting to the murders.

Fixed cameras in the court had recorded the proceedings, and a BBC documentary film in two parts, totalling 2 hours, was broadcast on BBC Scotland and then on BBC2 in the last weeks of August and the early weeks of September 2023.

== See also ==
- Lists of solved missing person cases
- Murder of George Murdoch – high-profile unsolved Scottish murder that like the McRae case was featured on the STV programme Unsolved in 2004
- Murder of Francis Jegou – high-profile UK unsolved murder also in 1976
