= Hugh Matthews =

Hugh Matthews may refer to:

- Hugh Matthews (politician) (born 1947), member of the Georgia House of Representatives
- Hugh Matthews, Lord Matthews (born 1953), Scottish judge
