= Traquair (disambiguation) =

Traquair is a village in Scotland.

Traquair may also refer to:

- Isla Traquair (b. 1980), Scottish television host
- Phoebe Anna Traquair (1852–1936), Irish-born artist
- Ramsay Traquair (1840–1912), Scottish palaeontologist
- Ramsay Traquair (architect) (1874–1952), Scottish architect

== See also ==
- Earl of Traquair
- Traquair House
