= Murder of Alistair Wilson =

Unsolved murder from 2004

Alistair Wilson
- Publicity photo of Alistair Wilson
- Born: c. 1974
- Died: 28 November 2004 (age 30); Nairn, Scotland
- Cause of death: Murder by shooting
- Known for: Victim of unsolved, targeted murder

Alistair Wilson was a banker aged 30 living in Nairn, Scotland who was shot dead at his doorstep on 28 November 2004. The ensuing murder inquiry was one of the largest ever carried out in Scotland and the crime remains unsolved. The apparent lack of motive and other unexplained elements of the murder have led to it being described as 'Scotland's most mysterious unsolved crime' and 'one of the most baffling cases of modern times', and it has attracted ongoing press coverage.

== Background ==
Wilson occupied a house in Crescent Road in Nairn with his wife Veronica and two young children while Veronica's father lived in the top floor flat. At the time of the murder, Alistair was the business manager at the local Bank of Scotland branch.

== Crime ==
Locations
1 Crescent Road, Nairn, Scotland - where Wilson was living at the time and where he was murdered.

At around 7pm on 28 November 2004, the doorbell of the Wilsons' house was rung and Veronica answered the door. An unidentified man wearing a baseball cap, dark blue jacket and dark jeans stood on the doorstep. He asked for Alistair Wilson by name and Wilson went to speak to him. A few minutes later he returned to his wife carrying an empty blue envelope with the name Paul on the front. Confused, he went back to the door, at which point Veronica Wilson heard three gunshots and, on going to the door, discovered her husband had been shot. He died in hospital later that evening.

In October 2020, The Guardian reported that Alistair's son Andrew was appealing for information about his father's murder. The police had revealed the type of firearm used, a 1930s 0.25 calibre Haenel pocket pistol and wanted help in identifying any user of such a pistol.

In April 2022, Police Scotland announced that Wilson's involvement in a local planning dispute around a hotel decking area opposite his house was a likely motive for his murder. They said that the hotelier was not a suspect and that the killers were likely customers or builders involved in the construction of the decking area. In 2023, Police Scotland announced that they believed two people had carried out the shooting and that one of them was likely a local they have identified who has spent time in prison for drugs offences.

== See also ==
- Murders of Harry and Megan Tooze – similar apparently motiveless shootings in the UK in 1993 which are also unsolved
- Murder of George Murdoch – another notorious unsolved Scottish murder that like Wilson's featured on the STV programme Unsolved
- Murder of Sheila Anderson – case which has been similarly described as 'one of Scotland's most notorious unsolved murders'
