= Lorna Dawson =

Forensic soil scientist and expert witness

Dame Lorna Dawson DBE FRSE FRSB FRSGS FRSA
- Occupations: professor of soil forensics, and expert witness in courts
- Employer: James Hutton Institute
- Known for: giving expert soil forensic evidence in major cases e.g. World's End murders
- Awards: Pride of Britain and Soil Forensic Expert Witness of the Year Award
- Honours: CBE FRSE

Dame Lorna Anne Dawson is British scientist who is a professor and head of soil forensics at the James Hutton Institute, Scotland, who is an Expert witness, a Chartered Scientist, and registered expert with the National Crime Agency. She won the award of Soil Forensic Expert Witness of the Year in the Corporate INTL 2021 Global Awards for her forensic research solving major criminal cases, including the World's End pub murders. She had won a special Pride of Britain Award by The Daily Mirror in 2017, for her role in solving long standing criminal cases, and her science communications. She is a Fellow of the Royal Society of Edinburgh, Commander of the Order of the British Empire, with international academic recognition.

== Education and early career ==
Dawson has a BA in Geography (honours) from the University of Edinburgh (1979) and a Ph.D. in Soil Sciences (University of Aberdeen, 1984). She has an Expert Witness Certificate in Criminal and Civil Law (Cardiff University, 2011, 2012, updated 2017). She worked at the Macaulay Land Use Research Institute with increasing responsibility, until it merged to form Hutton Institute 2011.

== Career ==
=== Criminal evidence ===
Dawson was expert witness in the 2014 re-trial of the World's End pub murders of teenagers, Christine Eadie and Helen Scott, found Angus Sinclair, guilty when soil samples (taken in 1977) from Helen Scott's bare feet, were studied using her techniques, after the law on 'double jeopardy' in Scotland had changed. Her expert evidence on soil from the accused boots was critical in the Emma Faulds murder trial. Dawson was also sent samples to be examined in relation to the missing toddler Ben Needham, 26 years after he was lost in Greece. Her expertise was brought in to the re-opening of the case on the 60 year old disappearance of schoolgirl Moira Anderson. Dawson has advised and reported on more than 150 cases, written more than 100 expert witness reports and presented evidence in 13 courts, in the UK and abroad.

=== Research ===
She is a Fellow of the British Society of Soil Science (BSSS), and has conducted online events (2021); a Chartered Soil Scientist, keynote speaker in 2020 at the first BSSS Annual Conference for United Nations Soil Day. Dawson was a council member of the Institute of Professional Soil Scientists (2009-2013) and was a member of the Science and Technology Facilities Council, Science in Society panel (2007-2011). Dawson has developed techniques on soil organo-mineral markers in forensic investigations with police authorities and European research collaborators. She is involved in international Geoforensics network as treasurer and is a member of the ENFSI (European Network of Forensic Science Institutes) Animals, Plants, Soils Traces working group. She serves on the Technical Committee of the University of Messina, Rome, where she teaches a Masters in Forensic Geology.

As head of soil forensics, she now has thirty years experience, including crime scene research and forensic evidence, and leads a team studying botany, mycology, palynology, mineralogy, organic and isotope chemistry, plant DNA and statistics. Dawson has published extensively on the subject of soil forensics and soil-plant interactions, with more than 100 peer-reviewed publications, books, and book chapters. She is also an expert advisor to the National Crime Agency, and has worked with numerous police forces in Scotland, England, Wales, Ireland, Brazil, Belize, and Australia .

She serves on SEFARI Scottish Environment, Food and Agriculture Research Institutes research consortium, conducting research under the Scottish Government Strategic Research Programme 2016-2021 on agriculture, environment, food and land. There she is leading a programme on Climate and the Environment, focussing on understanding impact on soils, biodiversity and ecosystems and considering adaptation and resilience, and part of the organisations gateway team for external engagement.

Dawson was elected a Fellow of the Royal Society of Edinburgh in 2019, and is a Commander of the Order of the British Empire.

=== Expert advisor ===
Dawson is an honorary professor in Forensic Science at Robert Gordon University, Aberdeen, as well as lecturing at the universities of Aberdeen, Strathclyde and Edinburgh. She was a member of the General Committee of the British Science Association from 2013. And she works on the Soil Quality Expert Advisory Group of Environment Protection Scotland. In 2016, she was a co-convenor of the international Symposium “Forensic Soil Science and Geology in South Africa, and also convened major international conferences.

Dawson's leadership on the Royal Society of Edinburgh Food, Farming and Countryside Scotland Inquiry, produced a report which concluded 'Farmers and farming groups are very much part of the solution to the issues of climate change and biodiversity loss'. And her conclusions are summarised from a virtual tour of Scottish agriculture and biodiversity, for delegates to 2021 UN Climate Change conference (COP26).

She continues to push at improving the science of forensic evidence from soils and promotes practical database collaboration.

== Bibliography: science communication and popular media ==
Dawson's up to date bibliography is published by the Hutton Institute.

Her research published output is also available on GoogleScholar.

In 2010, she co-edited and contributed chapters to the textbook Criminal and Environmental Soil Forensics.

Dawson has been involved in television documentaries Catching History's Criminals: The Forensics Story (2015) and Britain's Most Evil Killers (2017) and media interviews. She took an academic sabbatical to advise the BBC on programmes, such as Countryfile, Vera and Silent Witness.

Dawson began her TedX talk by saying 'You could say that soil is in my blood' referencing a childhood accident on her family farm. A BBC radio interview explained how she began a career in soil science, partly as she was a student at the time of the World's End murders. She has encouraged students to follow her into what she sees as a 'cool job'.

Dawson was the inspiration for a character (Professor Lee-Ann Inglis) in one of crime writer Ian Rankin's novels, In a House of Lies.

== Honours ==
Dawson was given a special recognition in the 2017 Pride of Britain awards: '“Soil sleuth” who has pioneered forensic techniques that have helped solve more than 100 crimes, and put some of the UK’s most notorious killers behind bars.' Dawson was made a CBE in the Queen's birthday honours list of 2018, and elected Fellow of the Royal Society of Edinburgh.

== See also ==
- Spanish wikipedia which provided material for this article https://es.wikipedia.org/wiki/Lorna_Dawson
- Disappearance of Ben Needham
- World's End Murders
- Forensic geology
