= Disappearance of Ben Needham =

English missing person case

Ben Needham
- Born: 29 October 1989; Boston, Lincolnshire, England
- Disappeared: 24 July 1991 (aged 1); Kos, Greece
- Status: Missing for 35 years, 1 month and 27 days

On 24 July 1991, Ben Needham (born 29 October 1989), a 21-month-old English child, disappeared on the Greek island of Kos. After initial searches failed to locate him, he was believed to have been kidnapped. Despite numerous claims of sightings, his whereabouts remain unknown.

In October 2012, South Yorkshire Police began to follow a line of inquiry which suggested that Ben had been accidentally killed and buried in a mound of rubble by an excavator driver working in a field adjoining the house where he was last seen. Extensive excavation of the rubble was undertaken by British and Hellenic Police. One item of particular interest to the police was a Dinky toy car, which they hoped to recover and believed could be "key to discovering his fate." The search failed to detect any human remains or items belonging to Ben.

In September 2016, the police returned to Kos to carry out further excavations. Although no remains were found, a yellow Dinky car, believed to have been Ben's, was recovered. Detective Inspector Jon Cousins, heading the inquiry, said: "It is my professional belief that Ben Needham died as a result of an accident near to the farmhouse in Iraklis where he was last seen playing. The recovery of this item, and its location, further adds to my belief that material was removed from the farmhouse on or shortly after the day that Ben disappeared." In November 2018, British police said that blood found on the aforementioned toy car was not Ben's.

== Disappearance ==
Ben Needham was staying with his family on the Greek island of Kos, where his maternal grandparents had a home in the village of Iraklis, near Kos town.

On 24 July 1991, Ben had been left in the care of his grandparents, Eddie and Christine Needham, while his mother went to work at a local hotel. Ben had been coming in and out of a farmhouse the family were renovating when, at approximately 2:30pm, the adults realised he had disappeared.

The family first searched the area for Ben, assuming he had wandered off, or that the boy's teenage uncle, Stephen, had taken him out on his moped. When no trace of the boy was found, the police were notified. They initially questioned the Needhams, viewing them as suspects, which delayed notification of airports and docks. Over the following 11 days, searches of the area were carried out by Hellenic Police, Hellenic Army and fire brigade personnel. Nikolaos Dakouras, the island's chief of police, said: "We now believe we have searched every possible part of that area, and the boy is not there. It leaves us with a great mystery. We have no theories. We have no solutions." Following a request from UK Prime Minister John Major, the Hellenic Army undertook further searches of the island in January 1993.

== Alleged sightings ==
There have been more than 300 reported sightings of boys matching Ben's description, both on the Greek mainland and on Greek islands. Most were reported shortly after his disappearance during 1991 to 1992. In December 1995, Stratos Bakirtzis, a private investigator, found a blond boy, aged around six years old, living with a Romani family in a camp located in Salonika, Greece. Bakirtzis told Greek TV network ANT1 that the child said he had been "given to the gypsies because his parents did not want him." Police from Veria took the boy into custody and determined he was not Ben Needham. Ioannis Panousis, Veria's chief of police, said the child's birth certificate was authentic and that the child's natural father was currently serving a prison sentence and had left him in the care of the Romani couple.

In November 1998, a British tourist, John Cookson, saw a blond boy of about ten playing on a beach in Rhodes. Cookson said that the child was known as 'the blond one' by his friends and was the only fair-haired child in the group of dark-haired Greek children. Suspicious, he took photographs of the children and used the pretext of tousling the boy's hair to acquire a hair sample for DNA analysis. However, DNA testing proved the boy was not Needham, and the Greek boy's family also provided infant photographs to prove he was their child.

In 2003, private investigator Ian Crosby launched a website to draw attention to Ben's case. In October that year, Crosby made a visit to Kos with Ben's uncle, Danny, followed by further visits to meet Greek police. A holidaymaker who had visited Turkey in 1999 sent Crosby a photograph depicting a number of Turkish village children, including a blond boy who resembled the age progression photo of how Ben might look aged 13.

The Needham family believed that Ben was kidnapped with the intention of selling him for adoption, or that he was taken by child traffickers. Carol Sarler, writing in The Times in 2007, said: "I have repeatedly asked police and press, British and Greek, for a single example to support this rumour. There is none. Those of us who properly investigated Ben's disappearance are certain he was not [abducted]; put bluntly, a child less than 2, toddling unsupervised for five hours on a baking, remote, inhospitable hillside that is still largely unsearched, is easy prey to the lonely accident."

=== Age progression images ===
In September 1992, South Yorkshire Police used E-FIT software to produce an image of how Needham might appear at age three. The picture was reproduced on posters which were displayed at airports around the Greek islands. It was thought to be the first time that E-FIT had been used to age a person's appearance. Further age progression images were created and distributed in March 2000, June 2003, October 2007 and September 2016.

== Police forensic excavations ==
=== October 2012 ===
In October 2012, police from the United Kingdom travelled to Greece to search an area that they believed might contain Ben Needham's remains. On 19 October, Greek police, assisted by a team of specialist search advisors from South Yorkshire Police, began an operation to examine the grounds of the property from which Ben disappeared.

The operation, involving geophysical survey equipment, forensic archaeologists and human remains detection (HRD) dogs, was triggered by a police line of inquiry into whether Ben had been accidentally buried as a result of an excavator driver dumping building rubble nearby. The operation did not detect any trace of the child.

=== September 2016 ===
In September 2016, police informed Kerry Needham that they had learned that a man from Kos had said that Konstantinos Barkas, a digger operator, now deceased, had told him that Ben had died in an accident, and that Barkas had hidden the body in building waste. On 16 September police began a search for remains, in a different area from the one searched nearly four years earlier. Excavation work ended on 16 October. More than 800 tonnes of soil had been dug up, with any items of interest sent back to the UK for forensic analysis. DI Cousins said that one item which was found "close to an item dated to 1991" had been identified by the Needham family as being in Ben's possession at the time he went missing. Cousins said: "My team and I know that machinery, including a large digger, was used to clear an area of land on 24 July 1991, behind the farmhouse that was being renovated by the Needhams. It is my professional belief that Ben Needham died as a result of an accident near the farmhouse in Iraklis where he was last seen playing. The recovery of this item, and its location, further adds to my belief that material was removed from the farmhouse on or shortly after the day that Ben disappeared."

=== 2017 findings ===
In July 2017, South Yorkshire Police announced that traces of blood were found on a fragment of a sandal, as well as soil from inside a toy car, both items believed to belong to Ben. The head of the British soil forensics group, Lorna Dawson, said her team discovered a genetic "profile indicative of human blood decomposition" on the piece of sandal and that the next step is to extract DNA from the fragment to determine whom the blood belongs to. According to Inspector Jon Cousins, these findings further strengthen the theory according to which Ben was killed the day he disappeared and is buried in Kos. However, it was reported in November 2018 that the blood on the toy car was not a match for Needham.

== In the media ==
The disappearance of Ben Needham has been the subject of several television documentaries:

- "The Lost Boy" – part of the Cutting Edge series, first broadcast in the UK by Channel Four on 10 March 1997.
- "Ben Needham: Somebody Knows" – part of the Real Crime series, first broadcast in the UK by ITV on 20 June 2001.
- "Ben Needham and Katrice Lee" (S01E01) – part of the Missing Children: Lorraine Kelly Investigates series, first broadcast in the UK by Sky Real Lives on 12 August 2009.
- "Unsolved Disappearances" (S02E05) – part of the Top 10 Secrets and Mysteries TV programme.

== See also ==
- Disappearance of Madeleine McCann
- List of people who disappeared mysteriously (2000–present)
