= Templeton Woods murders =

Pair of murders in 1979 and 1980 in Scotland

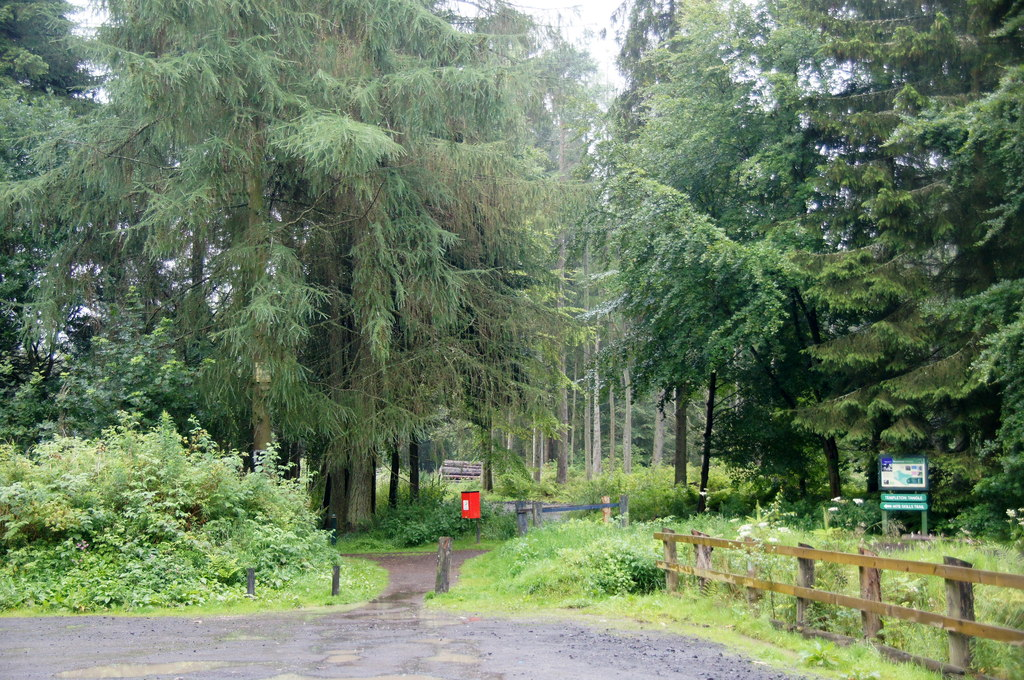
- Entrance to Templeton Woods where Carol Lannen and Elizabeth McCabe's bodies were found

- The locations where McCabe and Lannen were last seen in Dundee, and the locations they were both found dead
- Date: 20 March 1979 (Lannen); 11 February 1980 (McCabe)
- Accused: Angus Sinclair (both); Andrew Hunter (Lannen separately); Vincent Simpson (McCabe separately)

The Templeton Woods murders are the collective name coined by the press for the Murder of Carol Lannen in 1979 and Murder of Elizabeth McCabe in 1980 in Dundee, Scotland. Templeton Woods was where both bodies were discovered eleven months apart and both women disappeared from the centre of Dundee at nighttime, also eleven months apart. At times during investigation, police and media have believed the cases to be linked to one another, and at other times, believed the cases to be not linked.

== Cold case inquiries ==
In 1996, Tayside Police ordered a new review to take place of the murders of Carol Lannen and Elizabeth McCabe, following the reopening of the Bible John case in Glasgow.

In 2004, detectives from three police forces in Scotland announced that there were "strong links" between the then-unsolved murders of seven young women, including the murders of Lannen and McCabe and the World's End murders. These murders were investigated under Operation Trinity, and serial killer Angus Sinclair was identified as the prime suspect in all of the murders. Sinclair was subsequently convicted of the World's End Murders on DNA evidence and remains the prime suspect in three of the other murders: that of Anna Kenny, Hilda McAuley and Agnes Cooney in Glasgow during 1977. However, it was discovered that Sinclair definitely could not have committed the murders of Lannen and McCabe, since prison records show that he was imprisoned when both of the murders occurred.

In 2004, police linked to the murders of Lannen and McCabe together with five murders across Scotland as part of Operation Trinity, although police subsequently announced that the Templeton Woods murders were not linked to the other five cases and said in 2005 that there was no evidence to link the murders of Lannen and McCabe at that stage.

Investigators subsequently ruled out a link between the Templeton Woods murders and the five other cases, and also ruled out a link between the murders of Lannen and McCabe themselves.

== Media ==
External videos
- In the Footsteps of Killers series 2 episode 1

In 2004, both the Lannen and McCabe cases featured on the STV documentary series Unsolved, which focused on some of Scotland's most notorious unsolved murders.

In 2023, Channel 4 documentary In the Footsteps of Killers concurred with author of The Law Killers Alexander McGregor, that convicted wife murderer (who later died in prison) Andrew Hunter worked with Lannen and may have murdered her as he had strangled his second wife. Hunter also drove a red Ford Cortina.
