= Sandra Brown (campaigner) =

Scottish campaigner (born 1949)

Sandra Brown, OBE (born 7 January 1949) is a Scottish campaigner and leading expert on child protection issues. She has also achieved wide recognition as a writer, broadcaster and actress.

== Biography ==
The daughter of Mary and Alexander Gartshore, Brown was brought up in Coatbridge, Lanarkshire, Scotland.

Brown was educated at Coatbridge High School, Hamilton College and the Open University which awarded her an Honours degree in 1978 and a Masters in Education in 1996. She has worked as a primary school deputy headteacher and as a senior lecturer. She now runs her own business, Potential Plus, providing personnel training for companies and organisations. She has been married to her husband, Ronnie, for many years. They live in Edinburgh and have a son, a daughter and three grandchildren.

As well as campaigning against child sexual abuse, Brown has run a helpline for victims of workplace bullying in Scotland.

== Moira McCall Anderson ==
Brown has believed, for many years, that, in February 1957, her bus driver father, an alleged philanderer and paedophile, participated in the abduction and murder of a missing local schoolchild, Moira McCall Anderson.

She campaigned to bring her father to justice, but her efforts were thwarted in 2006, when he died.

=== Moira Anderson Foundation ===
In memory of the missing child, she spearheaded in 2000 the founding of a charitable organisation, the Moira Anderson Foundation (MAF).

Since its inception the Foundation has assisted more than 500 families who have been afflicted by child sexual abuse, violence, bullying and related problems. Despite research by Brown and others, Moira McCall Anderson's disappearance remains unsolved.

On 23 February 2007, the fiftieth anniversary of her disappearance, a memorial service was held for Moira at Airdrie Baptist Church, Lanarkshire. The service also commemorated other missing people and victims of child sexual abuse.

== Media appearances ==
Now prominent as a spokesperson on child protection issues, Brown makes frequent appearances in the Scottish newspapers and in the UK media. Notable broadcasts on BBC Radio Four include The Choice (radio series) (interviewed by Michael Buerk) and Woman's Hour (interviewed by Martha Kearney).

The unsolved case of Moira McCall Anderson has been the subject of three television documentaries - Cutting Edge and Unsolved, and the Zone Reality Show Psychic Private Eyes.

== Writings ==
=== One Of Our Ain ===
Brown has written a theatre play, recounting her childhood and the unexplained disappearance of the schoolchild - One Of Our Ain. This one-woman show, presented by Brown herself, has been staged at the Soho Theatre, London, Oran Mor Theatre, Glasgow and during the Edinburgh Festival Fringe 2006.

=== Where There Is Evil ===
Brown has written a best-selling book about her Lanarkshire childhood and the mystery of the schoolchild's disappearance - Where There Is Evil (Pan Macmillan Ltd, ISBN 0-330-44871-4). The book has sold over 100,000 copies internationally, and ensures that the missing child's memory remains vivid in the public imagination. It also highlights the need for on-going vigilance and wider awareness of child protection issues.

As of June 2013, Brown is co-writing a feature film screenplay adaptation of her life story & book, Where There Is Evil, with London screenwriter, Amanda Duke.

== Awards ==
- In 2002, Brown was voted runner-up Scottish Citizen of the Year, by readers of The Scotsman newspaper.
- In 2005, Brown was voted Scotswoman of the Year by readers of the Glasgow Evening Times.
- In December 2006, Brown was made an Officer of the Order of the British Empire (OBE), for services to child protection. The award was conferred by The Prince of Wales, at an investiture at Buckingham Palace.

== Press coverage ==
- Has confession solved a murder?
- Sins of the father
- Scotswoman of the Year 2005
- Sandra Brown interviewed on BBC Woman's Hour
- Family and friends in special tribute to murdered Moira
- Sandra Brown reveals movie based on life of Moira Anderson in works
