= Matthew Clarke, Lord Clarke =

The Right Honourable Lord Clarke

Senator of the College of Justice
- In office 2000–2016
- Nominated by: Donald Dewar; As First Minister
- Appointed by: Elizabeth II

Personal details
- Born: Matthew Gerard Clarke
- Education: University of Glasgow
- Profession: Advocate

Matthew Gerard Clarke, Lord Clarke, PC was a Senator of the College of Justice, a judge of the Supreme Courts of Scotland, sitting in the High Court of Justiciary and the Inner House of the Court of Session.

== Early life ==
Matthew Gerard Clarke was educated at Holy Cross High School Hamilton, and studied at the University of Glasgow (M.A., LL.B.). He was admitted as a solicitor in 1972, and lectured in the School of Law of the University of Edinburgh from 1972 to 1978, when he was admitted to the Faculty of Advocates. He was Standing Junior Counsel to the Scottish Home and Health Department from 1983 to 1989, in which year he was appointed Queen's Counsel. He served as a Judge of the Courts of Appeal of Jersey and Guernsey from 1995 to 2000.

He was a member of the Consumer Credit Licensing Appeal Tribunal from 1976 to 2000, of the Estate Agents Tribunals from 1980 to 2000, and of the Trademarks Tribunal from 1995 to 2000, and was part-time Chairman of the Industrial Tribunals from 1987 to 2000. He was a member of the UK Delegation to the Council of the Bars and Law Societies of Europe from 1989 to 1999, serving as its Leader from 1992 to 1996 He was appointed an Honorary Fellow of the Europa Institute at the University of Edinburgh in 1995.

=== Publications ===
Lord Clarke was the Scottish Editor of Sweet & Maxwell's Encyclopaedia of Consumer Law (1980), and has contributed to other publications, including:

- Corporate Law: the European dimension (1991)
- Butterworth's EC Legal Systems (1992)
- Green's Guide to European Laws in Scotland (1995)
- McPhail, Sheriff Court Practice (1999)
- A True European: essays for Judge David Edward (2004)
- Court of Session Practice (2005)

== The Bench ==
Clarke was appointed a Senator of the College of Justice, a judge of the Court of Session and High Court of Justiciary, the Supreme Courts of Scotland, in 2000, taking the judicial title, Lord Clarke. In 2007, Lord Clarke's decision to throw out the charges in the case of the World's End murders provoked a statement in the Scottish Parliament by Lord Advocate Elish Angiolini, resulting in a public dispute between her and the Lord Justice General, Lord Hamilton. Lord Clarke was principal commercial judge in the Court of Session before being promoted to the Inner House of the Court of Session in 2008, being at the time sworn to the Privy Council. He was a member of the Lands Valuation Appeal Court.

He sat on the Bench of the UK Supreme Court during the illness of Lord Rodger of Earlsferry, along with Lord Reed.

== See also ==
- List of Senators of the College of Justice
