= Isla Traquair =

Scottish television host (born 1980)

- Born: Isla Fiona Traquair; 1 January 1980 (age 46); Aberdeen
- Education: Westhill Academy, Aberdeen, Scotland
- Occupations: Journalist; Newsreader; TV presenter
- Notable credit(s): ITV News; 5 News; Buy.o.logic
- Website: Official Website

Isla Traquair (born 1 January 1980) is a Scottish television host, producer and journalist. She has worked with STV, Channel 5, and ITN. She is currently based between the UK and North America where she is the host of the TV show Buy.o.logic on the Oprah Winfrey Network.

== Early life ==
Traquair was born in Aberdeen on New Year's Day 1980 to parents Ian Traquair, a software developer, and Maureen Traquair, a school teacher. She has 3 brothers. She is the great-great-granddaughter of Phoebe Anna Traquair (1852–1936), a Scottish artist.

At the age of 15, Traquair began working one day a week at a press agency fitting it in around her studies. During this work placement, Traquair wrote a front-page story in a national paper about job losses due to the beef crisis.

== Newspaper journalism ==
In 1996, after cutting short her final year at school, Traquair was selected from hundreds of entrants to take part in an in-house training scheme with Aberdeen Journals. She remained with the newspaper group for nearly five years; for the last two she was the crime and court reporter for local Aberdeenshire broadsheet The Press and Journal.

== Television career ==
=== In Scotland ===
Traquair joined Grampian Television (now STV North) in early 2001 as a reporter, presenter and producer for North Tonight, Grampian Headlines, Grampian News and North Today.

Traquair's interest in crime also led to STV North and Central's TV series Unsolved which looked into Scotland's most intriguing murder mysteries. Traquair was involved in all three series, writing and producing the final series. The series sold worldwide.

=== ITV and Five News ===
After joining ITV News in November 2006, Traquair left to join Five News as a news correspondent and presenter. In June 2008, it was announced that she and Matt Barbet would stand-in for Natasha Kaplinsky during her maternity leave. Traquair continued to be the anchor of the 7:00 pm news programme after Kaplinsky's return. After Traquair left Five News, the slot was taken over by a chat show.

== Personal life ==
Traquair separated from her husband in 2007 and later divorced. A male neighbour was convicted of stalking Traquair in July 2022.
