= Double Jeopardy (Scotland) Act 2011 =

Act of the Scottish Parliament

- Act of the Scottish Parliament
- Scottish Parliament
- Long title: An Act of the Scottish Parliament to make provision as to the circumstances in which a person convicted or acquitted of an offence may be prosecuted anew; and for connected purposes.
- Citation: 2011 asp 16
- Introduced by: Kenny MacAskill, Cabinet Secretary for Justice
- Territorial extent: Scotland

Dates
- Royal assent: 27 April 2011
- Commencement: 28 November 2011 (Note: The Double Jeopardy (Scotland) Act 2011 (Commencement and Transitional Provisions) Order 2011 (SSI 2011/365).)

Other legislation
- Amends: Criminal Procedure (Scotland) Act 1995

Status: Current legislation

Text of statute as originally enacted

Revised text of statute as amended

Text of the Double Jeopardy (Scotland) Act 2011 as in force today (including any amendments) within the United Kingdom, from legislation.gov.uk.

The Double Jeopardy (Scotland) Act 2011 (asp 16) is an act of the Scottish Parliament which received Royal Assent on 27 April 2011. and came into force on 28 November 2011.

== Background ==
Following the acquittal of Angus Sinclair for the World's End Murders in 2007, on 20 November 2007 the then Cabinet Secretary for Justice Kenny MacAskill MSP instructed the Scottish Law Commission to consider the law relating to several issues arising from the trial and make recommendations for reform. One of these issues was "the principle of double jeopardy, and whether there should be exceptions to it".

In December 2009 the Scottish Law Commission published its report on the principle of double jeopardy. The commission recommended that the principle be retained in Scottish Law and also "The general rule against double jeopardy should be reformed and restated in statute". The commission further recommended that exceptions to the rule be created in three circumstances:

- Where the acquittal is tainted by offences against the course of justice such as (but not limited to) bribery, perverting the course of justice and subornation of perjury. The commission concluded that perjury in itself should not be suitable grounds to order a retrial.
- Where the previously acquitted has made a credible admission of guilt.
- Where new evidence which was not and could not with ordinary diligence have been available at the trial has been found. The commission recommended that this only be permitted where the new evidence "substantially strengthens the case against the accused" and that if a reasonable jury had heard the evidence at the trial that this would have made it highly likely that the accused be convicted.

The commission addressed the issue of retrospectivity, recommending that any exceptions to the rule of double jeopardy only apply to cases heard after any legislation created to create the exceptions is passed. This recommendation was not followed by the Scottish Government and the Double Jeopardy (Scotland) Bill introduced on 7 October 2010 included provisions to apply the proposed legislation retrospectively. Almost all of the other recommendations made by the Commission made it into the bill.

== Provisions ==
The act creates a statutory basis for the rule against trying a person twice for the same crime (known as double jeopardy). The act also creates three narrow exceptions to this rule.

There must be new and compelling evidence that was not available during the first trial.

The act only applies to murder, rape and certain other serious sexual crimes and culpable homicide.
