= Hugh Matthews, Lord Matthews =

Scottish judge

The Right Honourable Lord Matthews PC KC

Senator of the College of Justice
- Incumbent
- Assumed office 2007
- Nominated by: Alex Salmond as First Minister
- Appointed by: Elizabeth II
- Preceded by: Lord Dawson

Personal details
- Born: Hugh Matthews; 4 December 1953 (age 72)
- Education: University of Glasgow
- Profession: Advocate

Hugh Matthews, Lord Matthews (born 4 December 1953) is a Senator of the College of Justice, a judge of Scotland's Supreme Courts.

== Early life ==
Matthews was educated at St Columba's Primary School and St Joseph's Academy, both Roman Catholic state schools in Kilmarnock, East Ayrshire. He studied at the School of Law of the University of Glasgow (LL.B. Hons.), and was admitted to the Faculty of Advocates in 1979.

== Legal career ==
Matthews served as Standing Junior Counsel to the Department of Employment from 1984 to 1988, and as an Advocate Depute from 1988 to 1993, having been appointed Queen's Counsel in 1992. He was appointed a Temporary Sheriff in 1993, and in 1997 became a full-time Sheriff of Glasgow and Strathkelvin. In 2004, whilst still serving as a Sheriff, he was appointed a Temporary High Court Judge, and in 2007 was raised fully to the Bench of the Supreme Courts of Scotland, as Lord Matthews.

He sits in the High Court of Justiciary and the Outer House of the Court of Session. In 2014 he was the judge in the second trial in the World's End murders case in which he is famous for sentencing Angus Sinclair to life imprisonment with a minimum term of 37 years, which is to date the longest sentence ever passed by a Scottish court. In 2019 he was the judge in the murder of Alesha MacPhail case who sentenced Aaron Campbell to life imprisonment with a minimum of 27 years. Also in 2019 he sentenced Edward Cairney and Avril Jones to life in prison with a minimum of 14 years for the Murder of Margaret Fleming.

On 20 July 2021, it was announced that Lord Matthews had been appointed to the Second Division of the Inner House of the Court of Session with effect from 1 August 2021. The appointment was made by the Lord President of the Court of Session and Lord Justice Clerk and consented to by the Cabinet Secretary for Justice in order to allow court business to be dealt with efficiently and effectively.

In July 2022 he was appointed as a member of the Privy Council.

== Personal life ==
Lord Matthews married Lindsay Wilson in 2000. His interests include ancient history, golf, football, animal husbandry, astronomy and the theatre.

== See also ==
- List of Senators of the College of Justice
