= Murder of George Murdoch =

Notorious Scottish unsolved murder

George Murdoch
- Murdoch, c. 1983
- Born: 1924 or 1925; Aberdeen, Scotland
- Died: 29 September 1983 (age 58); Pitfodels Station Road, Aberdeen, Scotland
- Cause of death: Murder by strangulation with a cheese wire
- Occupation: Taxi driver
- Known for: Victim of one of Scotland's most notorious unsolved murders
- Spouse: Jessie Murdoch (died 2004)

Locations
1 Pitfodels Station Road on the city outskirts

George Murdoch (1924 or 1925 – 29 September 1983) was an Aberdeen taxi driver who, on 29 September 1983, was the victim of a notorious and brutal unsolved murder dubbed the 'Cheese Wire Murder'. Having picked up a passenger in his 20s or 30s on Aberdeen's Queen's Road, Murdoch was taken to Pitfodels Station Road on the city outskirts and attacked in brutal circumstances with a cheese wire. Two teenagers witnessed the man being strangled to death in the street and alerted the police, but help was unable to arrive in time. The killer stole Murdoch's fare money and wallet, but the victim only had £21 on him and it is not known whether robbery was the motive. The murder is one of Aberdeen and Scotland's most notorious unsolved crimes and was said at the time to have "shocked the nation". In September 2022, police appealed for information on a man seen in Aberdeen's Wilson's Sports Bar in 2015, saying he was in his 60s or 70s and wearing an Iron Maiden T-shirt. Police say they believed he has information which could help solve the case and ask him to come forward.

== Background ==
Murdoch was born and raised in Aberdeen and was described as a likeable individual who was "just an ordinary working man". His nephew described him as "kind and gentle - the nicest of guys". He enjoyed keeping pigeons and boating. He had been happily married for 37 years to wife Jessie, although in the late 1970s had been made redundant from his job at a factory. To make ends meet he took up work as a taxi driver, although he didn't particularly like the job and his wife worried about his safety on night shifts. He insisted to his wife that she didn't need to worry and said that if anyone ever tried to attack and rob him he would never fight them and would just hand over the money.

== Murder ==
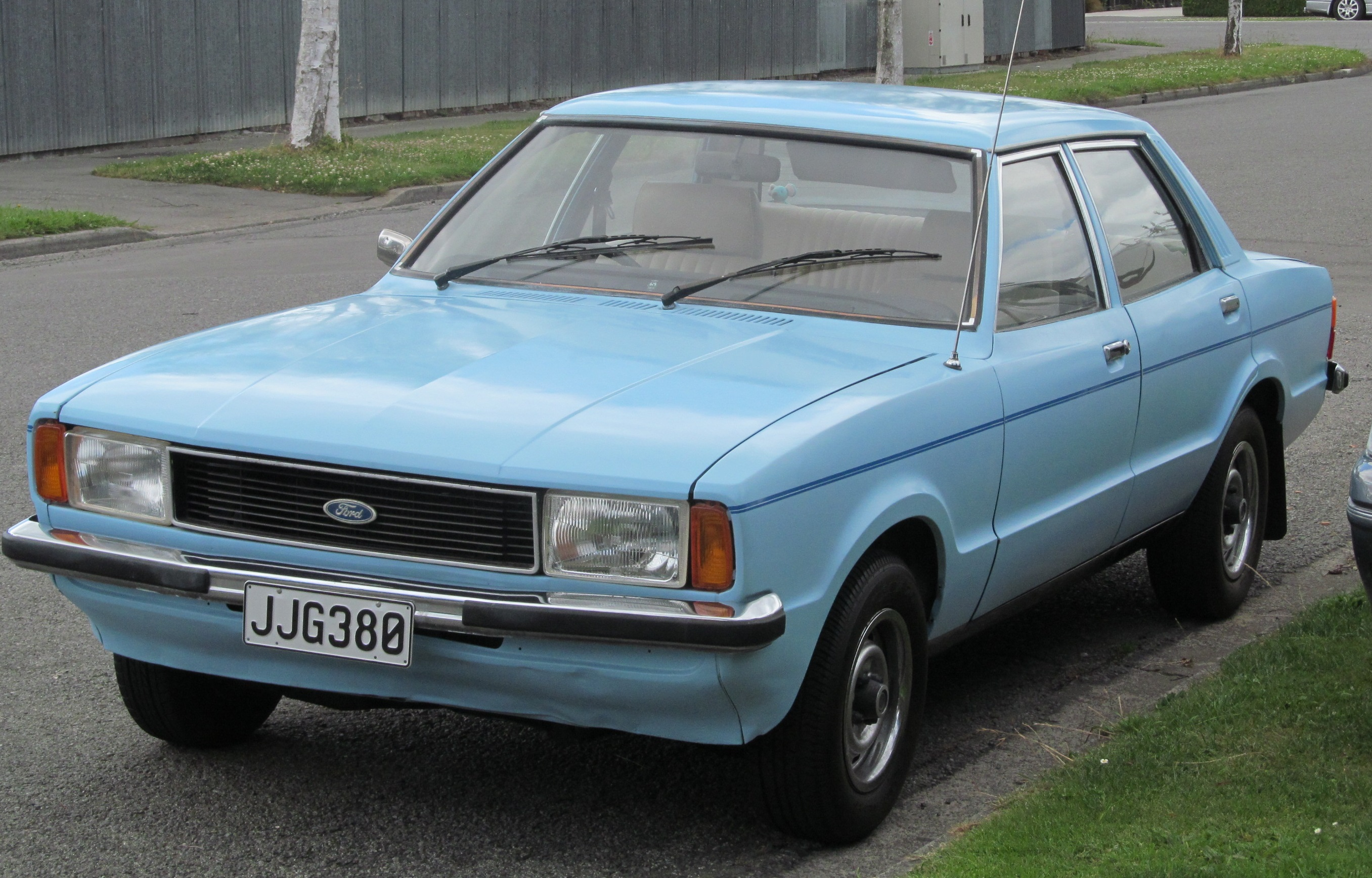
Murdoch was driving a light blue Ford Cortina taxi that night, similar to this vehicle.

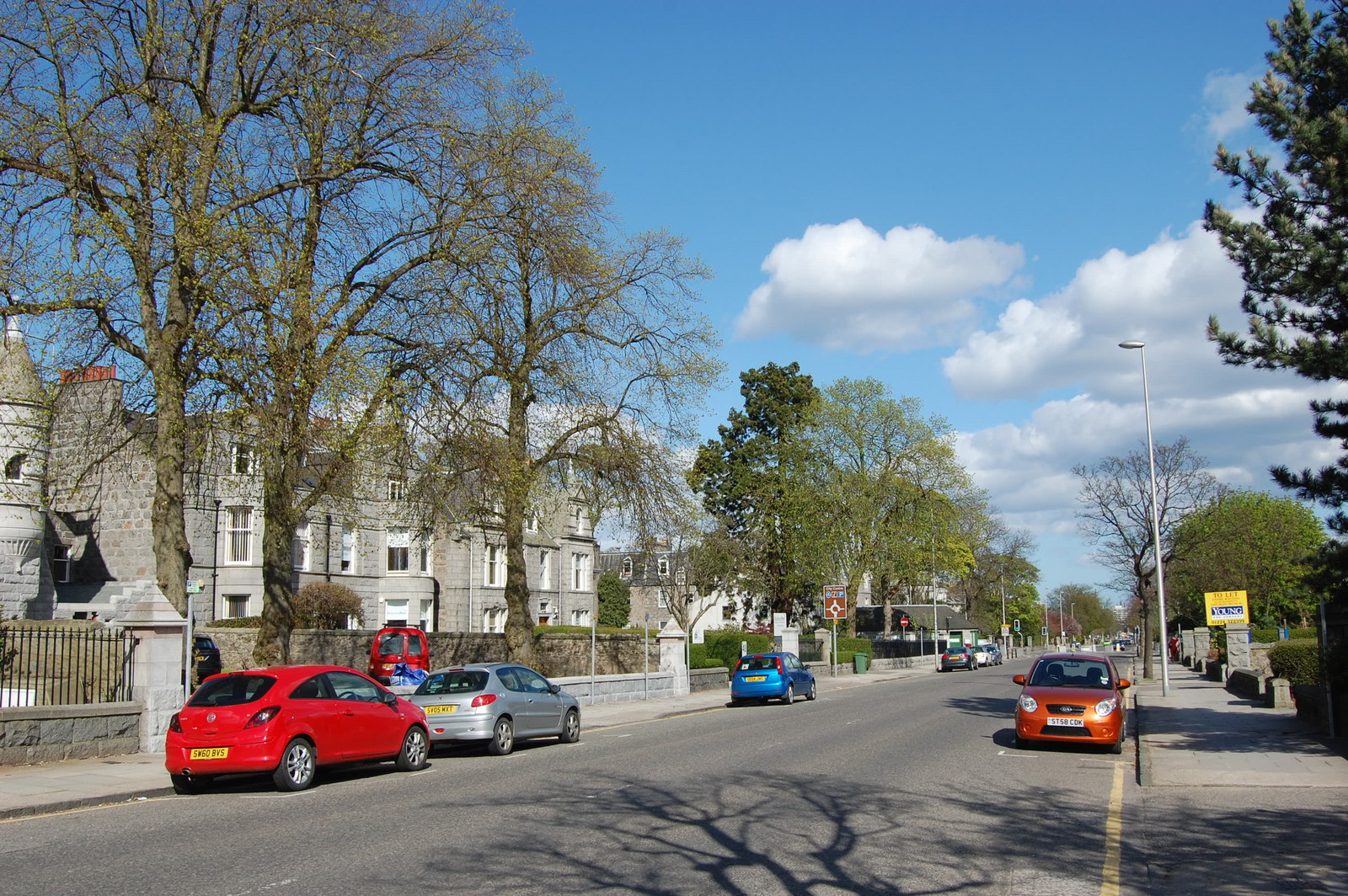
Queen's Road in Aberdeen, where Murdoch picked up the passenger who would kill him

On Thursday 29 September 1983, 58-year-old Murdoch was working an evening shift. At around 8:30 pm, his Ford Cortina car was seen parked in the busy Queen's Road in Aberdeen as he picked up a fare in his taxi. His taxi had been flagged down by a man in his 20s. Murdoch radioed through to the taxi control room that he and his fare were heading to Culter on the western outskirts of the city. After driving 2 miles (3 km) in his taxi towards Culter, he turned onto Pitfodels Station Road, just on the outskirts of the city in Braeside, where his vehicle stopped. Murdoch was then brutally attacked by his passenger, who used a cheese wire as a garotte. As the pair struggled, they spilled out onto the road, where two boys passing on their bikes witnessed Murdoch being strangled. Murdoch was desperately calling for help and the two boys raced to call the police, but the police did not arrive in time and the attacker killed Murdoch. The murder weapon, the cheese wire, was found at the scene.

The murder made headline news nationally and was said to have "sent shockwaves" across Aberdeen and "shocked the nation". The murderer was dubbed the "cheese wire killer". The callousness of the killer was noted, with him having brought a cheese wire out with him that night, presumably to attack someone, and having killed a man who always said he would never try and fight a potential robber. Murdoch's wife Jessie never recovered after the murder and her health declined, fearing that the killer was going to come back for her. She died on 24 March 2004, not knowing who killed her husband.

== Murder inquiry ==
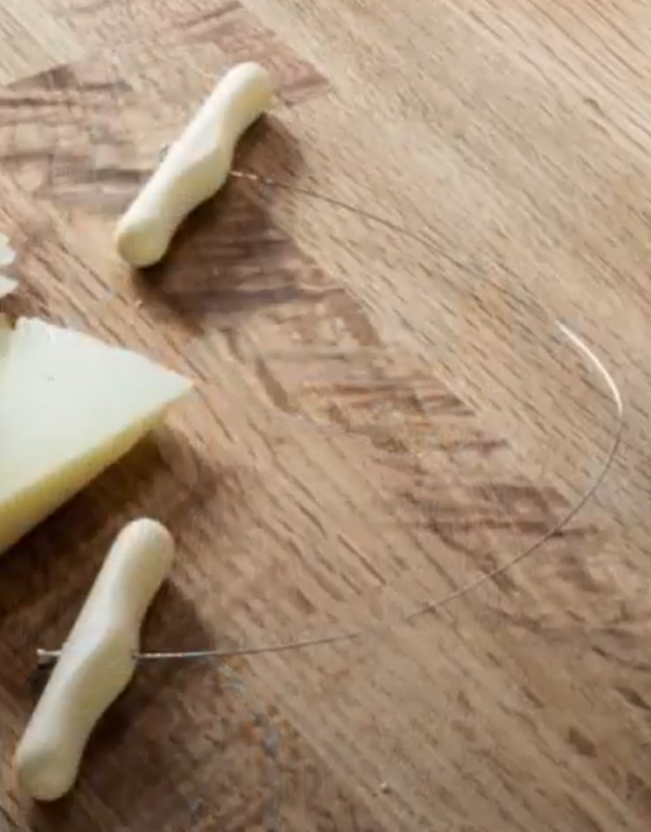
An example of a cheese wire, the weapon the killer used to kill Murdoch

The police launched a massive manhunt to find the murderer at the time, visiting 10,000 homes and taking 8,000 statements. The killer was described as between 20 and 30 years old, and was wearing dark clothing which police said could have been bloodstained after the attack. He was said to be 5 ft 7 in (1.70 m) tall, clean-shaven, thin and with short dark hair. He would have taken the cheese wire out with him that night, indicating it may have been a premediated murder. Murdoch's wallet and his fares had been stolen by the killer. Murdoch had only between £21 and £35 on him and police could not say for certain if robbery had been the motive for the murder.

Appeals were made for anyone in the Queen's Road area of the city between 8:15 and 8:45 pm that night to come forward. A sighting of a man with blood on his hands was made shortly after the murder at the local "Mr Chips" takeaway on the Great Western Road. The sighting was reported by the employee who had served him, but the blood-stained man was never traced. The man was wearing dark clothing, with dark hair and in his early 20s, which fitted the description of the killer. He had several scratches to his face, and a bruised eye and was asking for plasters to apply to his cut hand. This man would likely be in his mid to late 50s in 2022.

In the early 1980s, Aberdeen was rapidly changing due to the sudden growth of the oil industry, and this industry had brought with it many transient people to Aberdeen from outside the area. Police considered this when attempting to find the killer.

== Cold case investigations ==
"Closure to a family is like gold dust, something that you crave for, that you need. Even after 38 years, a family care. We've always cared. We always will."

— Murdoch's nephew, pleading for people to come forward to give his family closure, 2022

In 2022, the family of Murdoch and a local newspaper came together to offer a £20,000 reward for information leading to the capture of the killer. The case featured on Crimewatch Live on 14 March 2022, which led to new leads. Dozens of people came forward with new information, and Crimewatch Live released a statement saying "The George Murdoch case has clearly struck a chord". Murdoch's nephew pleaded for people to come forward to give the family closure, saying: "Closure to a family is like gold dust, something that you crave for, that you need. Even after 38 years, a family care. We've always cared. We always will".

In September 2022, police revealed they wanted to trace a man seen in Wilson's Sports Bar in Aberdeen in 2015 wearing an Iron Maiden T-shirt, saying that they believed he may be able to help with the inquiry. He was described as being small, stocky in his 60s or 70s and local to Aberdeen. The lead detective on the case, James Callander, said: "Following last year's appeal we now have information about a man we would like to speak to as we believe he may be able to assist with our investigation into the murder of George. We continue to receive information about what may have happened to George, which is very encouraging and I would like to thank the public for this. The public's continued assistance and support is vital in order to bring this inquiry to a conclusion and provide much-needed closure to George's family."

In September 2023, police revealed that they had isolated what is believed to be the DNA profile of the male killer, which has been described as the "most significant development in the case to date". Police appeal for anyone to come forward not just with names of those they may suspect were responsible, but also if they suspect they may be related to the offender, saying: "We're looking at sons and daughters who maybe had suspicions over the years that their father was responsible to come forward. We can take a simple DNA swab and we can compare that to give peace of mind to the family to say your father isn't responsible". The investigation team revealed that the DNA had been successfully used to eliminate most people that have come into the murder inquiry over its forty years. As of September 2023, there is a £50,000 reward for information on the case.

== Lasting notoriety ==
The case was featured on the STV documentary series Unsolved in 2004. The series focused on Scotland's most infamous unsolved murders.

Murdoch's murder was featured on STV News at Six on 28 September 2018 after a new appeal was made on the murder.

On the episode of Crimewatch Live which appealed for information on Murdoch's case on 14 March 2022, Murdoch's murder was described as having become one of the most notorious unsolved cases in the north-east of Scotland and one of Aberdeen's "darkest episodes".

The case was featured on Forensics: Murder Case, which aired on 21 July 2025 on 5.
