= Unsolved (British TV programme) =

- Also known as: Unsolved: Getting Away with Murder
- Genre: Crime documentary
- Presented by: Alex Norton (Main series); Isla Traquair (Update specials)
- Country of origin: Scotland
- No. of series: 3
- No. of episodes: 22 (1 special)

Production
- Production companies: Grampian Television (STV Studios)

Original release
- Network: Grampian Television (now STV North); Scottish Television (now STV Central)
- Release: 8 January 2004 – 30 November 2006

Unsolved (originally known as Unsolved: Getting Away with Murder) is a British regional crime documentary television programme produced by Grampian Television (now STV North) that aired in Scotland. The programme aired from 8 January 2004 to 30 November 2006.

== Background ==
The series investigated some of the most baffling and intriguing murders in Northern and Central Scotland, where the killers have never been caught and in some cases, the bodies never found. The series was presented by Taggart star Alex Norton, with series producer and former North Tonight presenter Isla Traquair hosting a special update programme at the end of both series. The programme was the brainchild of Producer Donald John Macdonald and made by Grampian TV in Aberdeen. The show was created in order to help the police find out more information from the public on unsolved murders. Both series of Unsolved generated a huge public response and in some cases, led to a breakthrough. The show was a contributory factor in police deciding to dig up a quarry as part of the investigation into the murder of Renee MacRae and her son Andrew, and while their bodies were never found, Northern Constabulary filed a report to the procurator fiscal naming the person responsible.

== Developments ==
A number of unsolved cases aired on this programme, have since been solved since the original broadcast.

An hour-long special was aired on 10 December 2008 following the conviction of Peter Tobin for the murder of Vicky Hamilton. It was only because of the police investigation of the murder of Tobin's final victim Angelika Kluk, that led police to trace his history; they discovered that he was living in Bathgate at the time Vicky vanished in 1991. A more significant development that emerged in the years following the series was the possible link between Tobin and Bible John. It was speculated that Tobin was in fact, the unidentified man known only as Bible John who murdered three women in the late-1960s. David Wilson, a Professor of Criminology at Birmingham University has spearheaded the thesis that both men are the same individual. Wilson states: "I didn't set out to prove Tobin was Bible John but I would stake my professional reputation on it."

Former Black Watch sniper Michael Ross, who was 15 at the time of the crime was sentenced to a minimum of 25 years for the 1994 murder of Shamsuddin Mahmood in 2008.

In January 2013, forensic experts exhumed a grave in a Coatbridge cemetery in the hope of finding the remains of Moira Anderson who vanished in 1957. No remains were found and it looks unlikely that it will ever be solved. However, child sex abuse campaigner Sandra Brown has always maintained that her own father, Alexander Gartshore, a convicted child sex offender and former bus driver who died in 2006, had abducted and killed Moira after she boarded his bus on her way to a nearby Co-op. She said in an interview with the BBC: "My dad was definitely a paedophile – and we're talking about the kind in the same mould as Jimmy Savile."

In March 2013, John Docherty was charged with the 1986 murder of Elaine Doyle. In August 2014, he was sentenced to a minimum of 21 years in prison.

In May 2019, Zhi Min Chen now 44, was found guilty of the murder of Tracey Wylde in 1997. He was arrested after fingerprints taken from him, following an unrelated assault which connected him to the crime.

In September 2022, William MacDowell was found guilty of the murder of Renee MacRae and her son Andrew. He was sentenced to a minimum of 30 years in prison.

In March 2023, Brenda Page's ex-husband, Christopher Harrisson, was found guilty of her murder 45 years after her death.

In December 2023, Robert O'Brien, 45, Andrew Kelly, 44, and Donna Marie Brand, 44, were convicted of Caroline Glachan's murder. All three had been teenagers at the time the crime was committed.

== Episodes ==
Series	Episode	Name	Air Date
1	1	Renee MacRae and her son Andrew	8 January 2004
1	2	Shamsudden Mahmood	15 January 2004
1	3	Brenda Page	22 January 2004
1	4	Templeton Woods murders	29 January 2004
1	5	George Murdoch	5 February 2004
1	6	Sandy Drummond	12 February 2004
1	7	Series one overview	19 February 2004
2	8	Alistair Wilson	3 November 2005
2	9	Robert Higgins	10 November 2005
2	10	Alexander Blue	17 November 2005
2	11	Caroline Glachan	1 December 2005
2	12	Shona Stevens	8 December 2005
2	13	Helen Puttock/Bible John	15 December 2005
2	14	Series two overview	22 December 2005
3	15	Moira Anderson	19 October 2006
3	16	Elaine Doyle	26 October 2006
3	17	Tracey Wylde	2 November 2006
3	18	Willie McRae	9 November 2006
3	19	Vicky Hamilton	16 November 2006
3	20	Annie Davies	23 November 2006
3	21	Series three overview	30 November 2006
3	22	One hour special	10 December 2008
