= World's End Murders =

Crime in Edinburgh, Scotland, in 1977

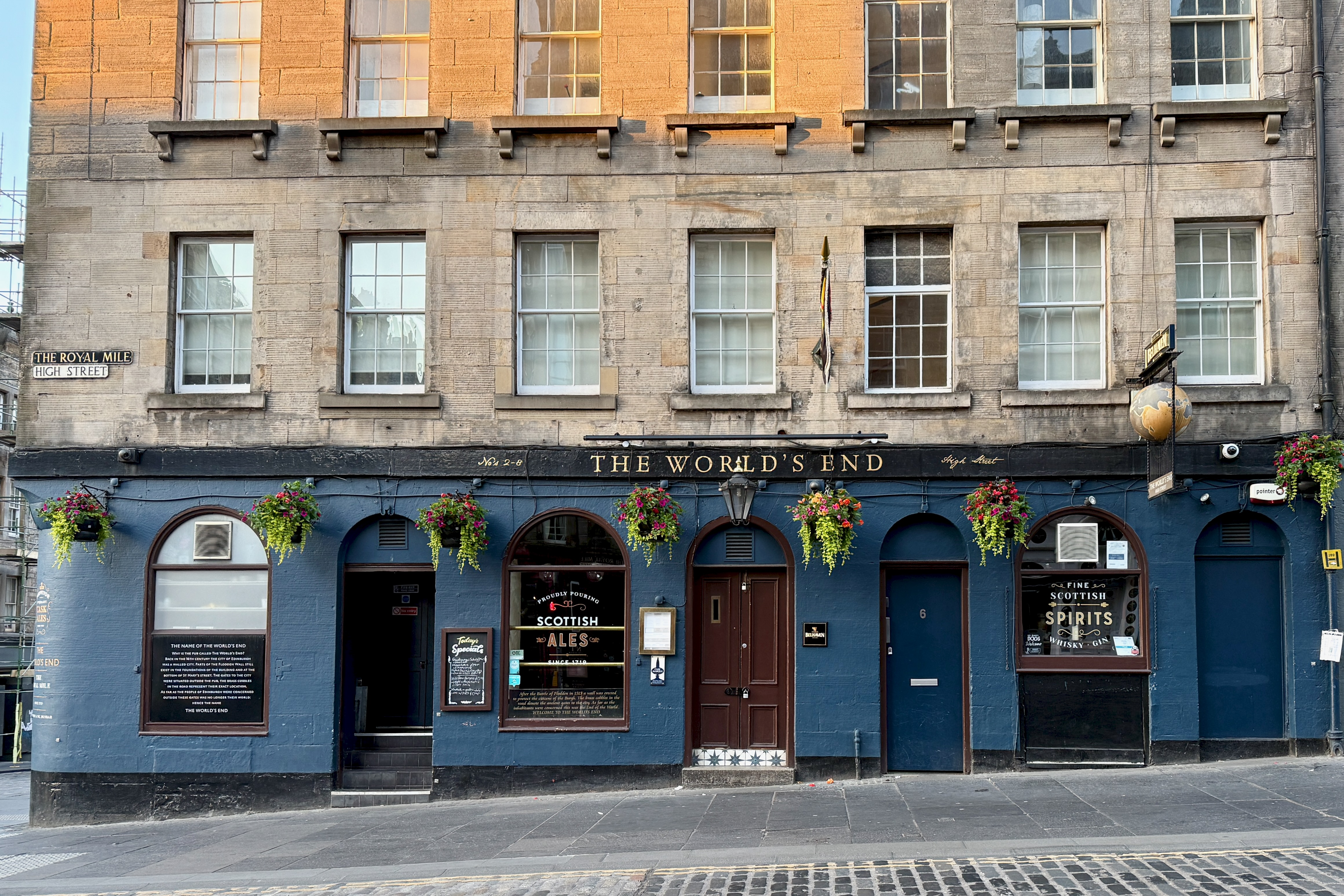
The World's End pub on High Street, Edinburgh, from which the case gets its name

The World's End Murders is the colloquial name given to the murder of two girls, Christine Eadie, 17, and Helen Scott, 17, in Edinburgh, in October 1977. The case is so named because both victims were last seen alive leaving The World's End pub in Edinburgh's Old Town. The only person to stand trial accused of the murders, Angus Robertson Sinclair, was acquitted in 2007 in controversial circumstances. Following the amendment of the law of double jeopardy, which would have prevented his retrial, Sinclair was retried in October 2014 and convicted of both murders on 14 November 2014. He was sentenced to life imprisonment with a minimum term of 37 years, the longest sentence by a Scottish court, meaning he would have been 106 years old when he was eligible for a potential release on parole. He died at HM Prison Glenochil aged 73 on 11 March 2019. His death was the same day the that BBC's Crimewatch Roadshow programme profiled the murders.

In addition to the murders of Eadie and Scott, Sinclair also pleaded guilty to the culpable homicide of his eight-year-old neighbour Catherine Reehill in Glasgow in 1961 when he was 16, and was given another life sentence in 2001 for the murder of 17-year-old Mary Gallacher on a footpath in Glasgow in 1978. He is believed to have also killed four other women between 1977 and 1978, all within a seven-month period of the murders of Eadie and Scott.

== Background ==
On the night of 15 October 1977, Christine Eadie and Helen Scott, both seventeen, were seen leaving The World's End pub, located at High Street on the Royal Mile, at closing time. The following day, Eadie's naked body was discovered in Gosford Bay, East Lothian, by a couple walking in the dunes. Scott's body was found unclothed six miles away from Eadie's, in a corn-stubble field. Both girls had been beaten, gagged, tied up, raped and strangled. No attempt had been made to conceal their bodies.

In late 1977, Lothian and Borders Police conducted a high-profile criminal investigation, collating a list of over 500 suspects and taking over 13,000 statements from members of the public. Despite their efforts, they were unable to identify a culprit. The case commanded widespread attention in the Scottish media at the time, and a photo-booth picture of the two girls was used by police in their appeals for information.

At the time, the media reported that several witnesses had told police they had seen Helen Scott and Christine Eadie sitting near the public telephone in the bar, talking with two men. Neither of these men were traced or have presented themselves to the police. Speculation that the killings had been the work of two men was heightened when it was revealed that the knots used to tie the girls' hands behind their backs were of different types.

In May 1978, Lothian and Borders Police announced that they were scaling down the investigation.

=== Cold case review ===
In 1997, Lothian and Borders Police's cold case unit instructed further forensic work to be undertaken in the case, reflecting improvements in DNA profiling technology since the murders occurred. This resulted in the isolation of a DNA profile of a male, found on both girls. The DNA of the original 500 suspects was analysed and compared to the new sample, but there was no match.

On 8 October 2003, following the broadcast of a reconstruction on the BBC's Crimewatch programme, the incident team at Lothian and Borders Police received a phone call from a man who claimed he was walking near Gosford Bay on the night of the murders, and that he saw a suspicious vehicle. He said it was a works van and it was being driven erratically. The man did not come forward with this information during the initial investigation. It was revealed that immediately following the Crimewatch broadcast in 2003, police had received 130 calls from witnesses who had not previously made themselves known to the investigation.

On 15 October 2003, it was reported in the press that Lothian and Borders Police had enlisted the help of the Forensic Science Service (FSS) to try to determine the identity of the person whom the unknown DNA sample belonged to. The unknown sample partially matched over 200 profiles in the National DNA Database.

On 25 November 2004, Angus Robertson Sinclair (7 June 1945 – 11 March 2019), a man who lived in Edinburgh at the time of the murders, was detained under section 14 of the Criminal Procedure (Scotland) Act 1995 in connection with the murders. Mouth swabs were taken for analysis.

On 31 March 2005, Sinclair was arrested and charged by Lothian and Borders Police. On 1 April 2005, he appeared on petition, in private at Edinburgh Sheriff Court, charged with the murder and rape of the two girls in October 1977. He made no plea or declaration at this time and was remanded in custody.

== HM Advocate v Sinclair (2007) ==
HM Advocate v Sinclair (2007)
- Court: High Court of Justiciary
- Full case name: Her Majesty's Advocate v Angus Robertson Sinclair
- Decided: 10 September 2007

Court membership
- Judge sitting: Lord Clarke

=== Trial ===
On 27 August 2007, the trial of Angus Sinclair began in Court 3 at the High Court of Justiciary in Edinburgh. The presiding judge was Lord Clarke. The prosecution was led by advocate depute Alan Mackay, and the defence by Edgar Prais, QC.

The indictment alleged that on the night of 15–16 October 1977, Sinclair and Gordon Hamilton (Sinclair's brother-in-law who had since died) persuaded or forced the girls into a motor vehicle and held them against their will, in St Mary's Street, near The World's End pub. It was alleged that he then drove Christine Eadie to Gosford Bay, Aberlady, and there or elsewhere attacked, stripped and gagged her with her underwear, and tied her wrists, before raping her and then killing her by restricting her breathing. He was further accused of raping and murdering Scott in the same way and driving her to a road near Haddington, and in a field there or elsewhere in Edinburgh and East Lothian attacking her.

Sinclair pleaded not guilty to rape and murder. At the commencement of the trial date Sinclair lodged two special defences, one of consent and one of incrimination, stating that any sexual activity between him and the two girls had been consensual and that if they had come to any harm, the person responsible was Gordon Hamilton.

The jury of nine women and six men began hearing evidence on 28 August 2007. No eyewitness evidence was led; the Crown case was wholly circumstantial.

On 3 September 2007, the advocate depute led evidence from Detective Constable Carol Craig, who noted that Angus Sinclair owned a Toyota Hiace caravanette at the time of the murders, that he had since destroyed. As a result, she confirmed that police were unable to carry out forensic tests on any of the fabrics or seat upholstery inside the vehicle.

On 4 September 2007, a forensic scientist, Martin Fairley, gave evidence that semen obtained from a vaginal swab of Eadie, and semen obtained from a vaginal swab of Scott shared the same DNA profile.

On 7 September 2007, another forensic scientist, Jonathan Whitaker, gave evidence that semen-matching swabs taken from Angus Sinclair were found mixed with cells with the same DNA profile as Helen Scott, on a coat belonging to Helen Scott. He also told the court how brothers and sisters of Sinclair's dead brother-in-law, Gordon Hamilton, had provided samples for DNA testing, and that the results of these tests had been compared with the semen found in the bodies of the victims. He explained that the results obtained are what he would expect if semen found in the victims had come from a brother of the surviving Hamiltons. Whitaker was the final witness in the Crown case.

=== No case to answer submission ===
On the afternoon of 7 September 2007, senior counsel for the defence, Edgar Prais, QC, made a submission under section 97 of the Criminal Procedure (Scotland) Act 1995, that Sinclair had no case to answer in respect of the charges libelled, due to an insufficiency of evidence. In particular, he contended that the Crown had failed to lead evidence that Angus Sinclair had been involved in acting with force or violence against the girls and that the advocate depute had not led evidence to prove that any sexual encounter between the panel and the girls had not been consensual.

On 10 September 2007, following legal arguments on the matter, the trial judge Lord Clarke upheld the defence submission of no case to answer and formally acquitted Sinclair before putting it to the jury.

=== Aftermath ===
Following the conclusion of the trial it was revealed that Angus Sinclair was already a convicted murderer and serial sex offender, and was serving two life sentences at HMP Peterhead when his case was brought forward in the World's End Murders. It was also revealed that Sinclair had previously completed a prison sentence for culpable homicide.

Sinclair's first conviction occurred in 1961, at age 16, when he pleaded guilty and was convicted of the culpable homicide of seven-year-old Catherine Reehill and served six years in prison. Sinclair sexually assaulted and strangled her in his family home. In 1982, five years after the World's End Murders, he pleaded guilty to 11 of 13 charges libelling various rapes and indecent assaults committed against young girls, and was sentenced to life imprisonment. In June 2001, still in prison, he went to trial and was given another life sentence for the murder of 17-year-old Mary Gallacher on a footpath near the Barnhill railway station in Glasgow in November 1978, thirteen months after the World's End Murders. The teenager had been dragged into bushes, sexually assaulted, had her throat cut and a ligature tied around her neck. Again Sinclair failed to accept any responsibility for the crime and denied all knowledge, despite being found guilty by a majority verdict and faced with the reality that the chances of a DNA sample matching anyone other than Sinclair, were "a billion to one." Sinclair was only caught for the 1978 murder after a cold case review by Strathclyde Police revealed the presence of new DNA evidence not uncovered during the initial investigation.

News of the verdict drew widespread comment and criticism in the Scottish press. Such was the level of public and media interest in the outcome of the case, on 13 September 2007 the Presiding Officer of the Scottish Parliament took the unusual step of allowing the then Lord Advocate, Elish Angiolini, to address the Scottish Parliament on the matter. The Lord Advocate read a prepared statement to the chamber setting out the narrative of the Crown case and explaining her reasoning for deciding to prosecute. She is recorded in the official transcript of her address as saying that she was "disappointed" with the result, and that she "was of the clear opinion that the evidence that was made available to the court was sufficient to put before the jury to allow it the opportunity to decide on the case against Sinclair".

In response, on 26 September 2007, the then Lord Justice General, Lord Hamilton, took the unprecedented move of publicly criticising the Lord Advocate's decision to address the Scottish Parliament on the case. In an open letter, Lord Hamilton wrote, "the plain implication from your statements is that you were publicly asserting that the decision of the trial judge was wrong" and explained that her actions could be seen to "undermine public confidence in the judiciary".

In the following weeks, several eminent former Scottish judges became involved in the debate. On 28 September 2007, former Solicitor General and retired Senator of the College of Justice, Lord McCluskey, gave an interview to The Herald stating that he believed Lord Hamilton had no grounds to accuse Elish Angiolini of threatening the independence of the judiciary. He is quoted as saying, "He's quite wrong. What he fails to see is that it is sometimes essential for a minister to comment upon a case. It happens all the time in parliament".

Another retired Senator of the College of Justice, Lord Coulsfield, gave an interview on BBC Scotland's Sunday Live programme, stating that "The real issue here is whether a decision of the magnitude that Lord Clarke had to take should always be taken by a single judge".

=== Legal consequences ===
The furore surrounding the outcome of the case led to a far-reaching and systematic review of Scottish criminal procedure. On 20 November 2007, the Cabinet Secretary for Justice, Kenny MacAskill, MSP, referred several issues arising out of HMA v Sinclair to the Scottish Law Commission for investigation.

On 31 July 2008, the Scottish Law Commission published its first report, on the issue of Crown appeals. On 2 December 2008, the Commission published its second report, on the issue of double jeopardy. The commission published its final report, on the admissibility of bad character and similar fact evidence in criminal trials, in late 2012.

On 30 June 2010, the Scottish Parliament passed the Criminal Justice and Licensing (Scotland) Act 2010. Following on from the recommendations of the Scottish Law Commission, sections 73–76 of the act make provisions for Crown rights of appeal against certain decisions taken by a trial judge sitting in solemn proceedings (before a judge and jury). Amongst other things, it provides a mechanism for Crown appeals against rulings on no case to answer submissions. On 28 March 2011, sections 73–76 of the Criminal Justice and Licensing (Scotland) Act 2010 came into force.

On 22 March 2011, in direct response to the Scottish Law Commission's findings on the issue of double jeopardy, the Scottish Parliament passed the Double Jeopardy (Scotland) Act 2011. The act makes various provisions for circumstances when a person convicted or acquitted of an offence can be prosecuted anew.

== HM Advocate v Sinclair (2014) ==
HM Advocate v Sinclair (2014)
- Court: High Court of Justiciary
- Full case name: Her Majesty's Advocate v Angus Robertson Sinclair
- Decided: 14 November 2014

Case history
- Prior action: HM Advocate v Sinclair (2007)
- Related action: Double Jeopardy (Scotland) Act 2011

Court membership
- Judge sitting: Lord Matthews

On 14 March 2012, the Crown Office issued a press statement saying that the Procurator Fiscal had instructed Lothian and Borders Police to re-open the investigation into the murders of Christine Eadie and Helen Scott, following the introduction of the Double Jeopardy (Scotland) Act 2011.

Three judges set aside eight days of court time in October 2013 to hear a bid from prosecutors pressing for Sinclair to stand trial for the second time. On 15 April 2014, the Crown was granted permission to bring a new prosecution against Angus Sinclair.

The trial commenced on 13 October 2014 at the High Court of Justiciary sitting in Livingston, West Lothian. The prosecutor was Frank Mulholland, the Lord Advocate, and the judge was Lord Matthews. At one stage the jury visited the scene of the murders in East Lothian. Forensic soil specialist, professor Lorna Dawson examined soil samples taken in 1977 from Helen Scott's bare feet, which was pertinent to the evidence. On 14 November 2014, Sinclair was found guilty of the murders of Helen Scott and Christine Eadie on 15 October 1977. Following the conviction, Lord Matthews sentenced Sinclair to life imprisonment with a minimum term of 37 years. This means he would have been 106 years old before being considered for parole. He died in prison in March 2019.

== See also ==
- Chris Clark (writer), author of Gone Fishing: The Unsolved Crimes of Angus Sinclair, a 2021 book alleging links between Sinclair and a number of unsolved murders
- Templeton Woods murders – Pair of murders in 1979 and 1980 in Scotland
- Murders of John Greenwood and Gary Miller, UK unsolved 1980 case which has led to calls for further "double jeopardy" reform
- Murder of Sheila Anderson, another infamous Edinburgh murder, in 1983, which has similarly been described as one of Scotland's most notorious unsolved murders

== Cited works and further reading ==
- Wood, Tom; Johnton, David (2014). The World's End Murders: The Final Verdict. Edinburgh: Birlinn Limited. ISBN 978-1-780-27210-8.
- Clark, Chris; Lloyd, Adam (21 September 2021). Gone Fishing: The Unsolved Crimes of Angus Sinclair. Mango Books. ISBN 978-1-914277-22-1.
