= Murder of Jessie Earl =

Unsolved death in 1980

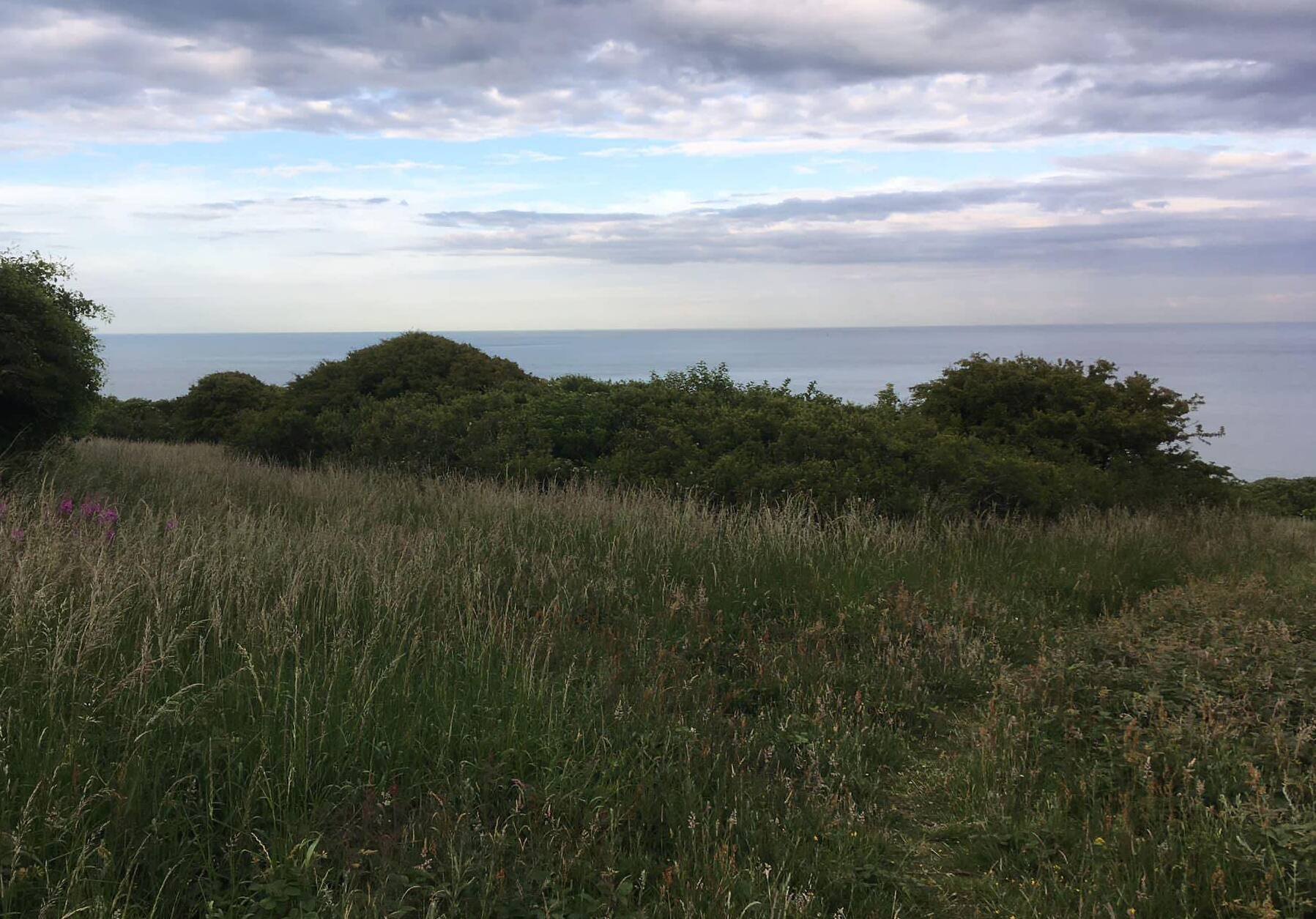
- The thicket in which Earl was found dead in 1989
- Date: Between 15 and 18 May 1980
- Location: Beachy Head, Eastbourne; 50.749022°N 0.258050°E
- Cause: Unknown, but as a result of the intentional actions of a third party

Death of Jessie Earl (East Sussex)

Jessie Earl (16 December 1957 – between 15 and 18 May 1980) was a 22-year-old student who disappeared from Eastbourne, England in May 1980. It was not until 1989 that her remains were discovered in thick undergrowth on Beachy Head, where she would regularly take walks.

The inquest into her death was criticised and attracted considerable controversy in the long term after it was concluded that there was "insufficient evidence" to determine whether she had been murdered, despite the fact that she had been found with her bra tied around her wrists and without any of her other clothes or belongings. Her parents insisted she must have been murdered, but the inquest into her death recorded an open verdict, leading to the key forensic evidence being destroyed in 1997 since the case had not been classed as murder. Despite this, in 2000 Sussex Police opened a murder investigation after further forensic, scene, witness and pathology inquiries, saying that they believed she was murdered.

In 2020 her parents requested that the Attorney General open a new inquest into her death so as to formally re-classify her death as murder. This request was approved in December 2021, and a second inquest in May 2022 overturned the open verdict and concluded that she had been murdered. It was further noted that she had most likely been tied with her bra to a tree she was found next to, and that she had "possibly" been sexually assaulted. The coroner said that her parents had been "victims of substantial injustice".

Serial killer and sex offender Peter Tobin, who lived in the area at the time, has been a suspect in Earl's murder and the case was investigated as part of Operation Anagram, which had been set up in the late 2000s to investigate links between Tobin and unsolved murders. Earl's disappearance and murder is linked to the disappearance of another young woman from Beachy Head in 1988. Eighteen-year-old Louise Kay vanished after saying she was going to sleep in her car on Beachy Head in June 1988 and neither she nor her car have ever been seen again. Earl's body was found on Beachy Head less than a year later. Tobin is also the prime suspect in Kay's presumed murder.

== Background ==
Jessie Victoria Earl was born to Valerie and John Earl, and was described as "strong and independent". She was an art student, studying at the Eastbourne College of Art and Design (now East Sussex College). She enjoyed writing about and being amongst nature, and liked walking on the Sussex coast. Her favourite place to walk was on Beachy Head and she would enjoy reading there.

== Disappearance ==
On Thursday 15 May 1980, Earl rang home from a phone box on the seafront at Eastbourne. She wanted to tell her mother that she would see her on Friday. When Earl failed to arrive on Friday, her parents were not overly concerned. They were simply worried that she had not phoned them to tell them that she had changed her plans. She always notified them when she did.

The next day, 17 May, Jessie's mother Valerie caught the train to Eastbourne to find out what had happened. Upon opening the door to Jessie's bedsit in Upperton Gardens, she immediately felt there was something wrong. There were dirty dishes on the table, a book and Jessie's reading glasses on the floor, and her purse on the bed. It appeared that the room had been abandoned, as if she had briefly left for a short while but not returned. Friends said that they hadn't seen her since Wednesday. There was nothing in Earl's diary which gave any indication of why she had gone missing. Earl was 22 at the time.

Police sniffer dogs searched the area and Jessie's bedsit was searched for clues, while missing person posters were distributed. After three weeks, Sussex police flew a helicopter over the South Downs, using a thermal scanner in the hope of finding something. After police found no trace of her, the investigation was scaled down. Jessie's parents continued to campaign and made appearances on the BBC's Wogan chat show and on Crimewatch to appeal for information.

== Discovery of body ==
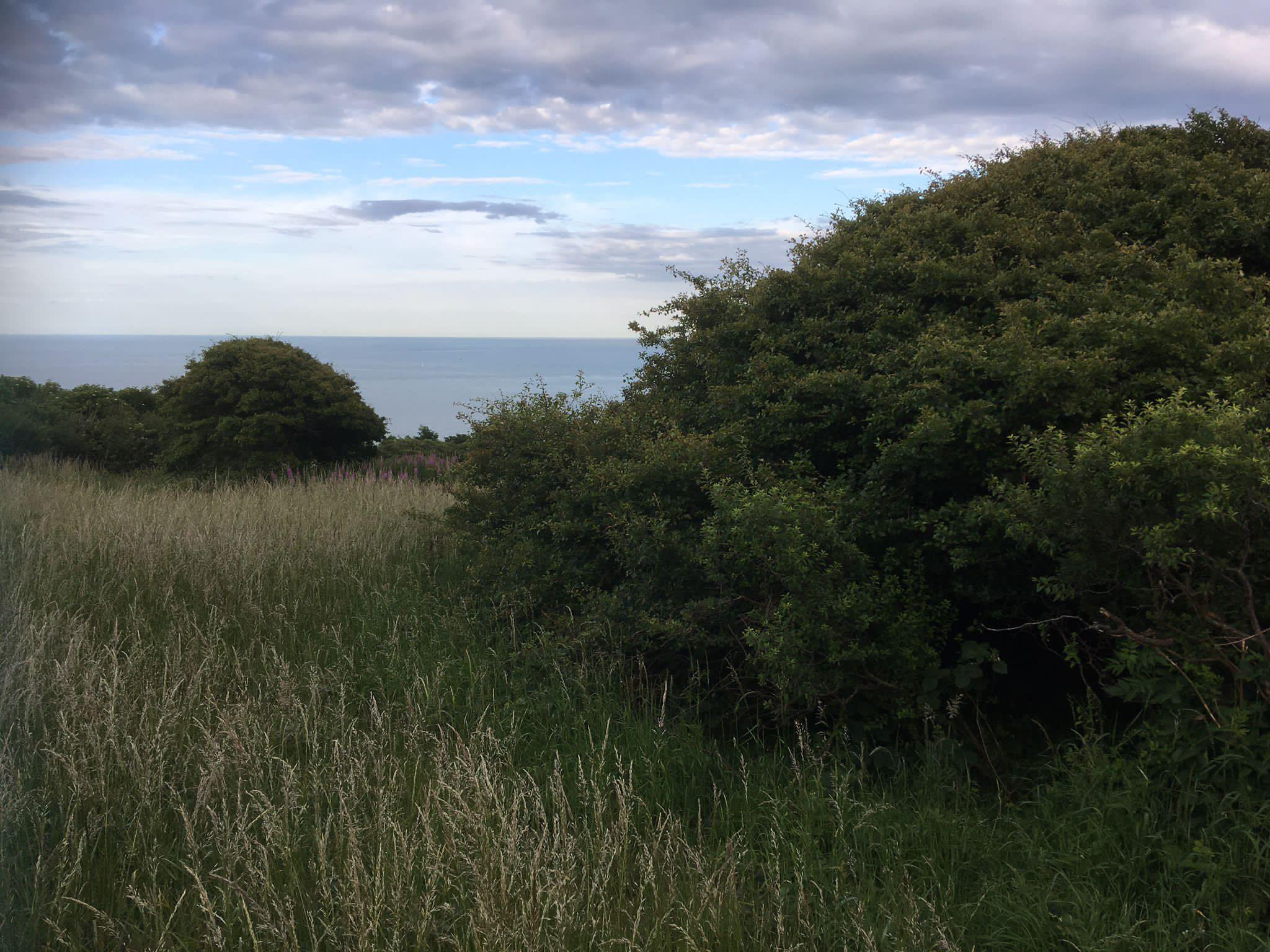
Earl's body was found in the thicket (right of image).

Earl's body was located in 1989. An eight-year-old girl had been flying a kite on Beachy Head before losing control of it in the wind. The kite got caught in an overgrown thicket, and when the child's father waded into the shrubland to retrieve it, he discovered a skeleton, which was Earl's remains. The only piece of clothing police found was a bra, tied around Earl's wrists. Apart from this, she had been naked. Her silver ring, watch, leather bag and her asthma inhaler were missing.

Forensics were only able to establish that Earl had died at the scene. Officers cleared an area of 20 square metres around where she had been found, and this was then excavated and the soil minutely examined for evidence. A volunteer team of metal detectors led by an archaeologist searched the cliffs and found items such as jewellery and belt buckles, although they didn't help the investigation.

At the 2022 inquest into Earl's death, it was revealed that Earl had "probably" been tied to a tree with her bra, since most of her bones were found by a tree and the bra had been "found very close to the base of the tree". The inquest subsequently concluded that she had "possibly" been sexually assaulted.

=== Initial inquest ===
Four months after the discovery of the body, a coroner recorded an open verdict at the inquest. The reason cited for the open verdict was that there was a "lack of evidence" that might have proved a cause of death. However, Earl's parents insisted she would never have run off and must have been killed. A police report in 1980 had previously concluded that Earl must have committed suicide due to "pressure of exams" and "depression over a number of allergies she suffered", and a second inquest in 2022 would later highlight this as being a reason why the case had not been seriously investigated.

== 2000 murder inquiry ==
In 2000, after forensic, scene, witness, and pathology inquiries, the police recorded her death as murder. A murder inquiry was launched, with the detective chief inspector leading the investigation commenting "We believe that Jessie was murdered." However, because Earl's death had never been officially classed as a murder, the key forensic evidence had been destroyed by police in 1997. This included the bra and the earth on which Earl had been found, which had been stored afterwards. This meant that when the murder inquiry was opened in 2000, the evidence could not be analysed using modern forensic techniques. The lead investigator of the 2000 inquiry, DCI Steve Dennis, has said that this was a significant mistake.

== Peter Tobin as a suspect ==
Scrubland at the top of Beachy Head with Eastbourne beyond

A new suspect emerged in the late 2000s, serial killer and sex offender Peter Tobin. Tobin had killed 23-year-old Angelika Kluk in Glasgow in 2006, but was subsequently linked to two missing persons cases from 1991 after police suspected he was responsible for numerous other murders. The two young women's bodies were later found buried at his former home in Margate. Police set up Operation Anagram after his 2006 murder, with the aim of tracing Tobin's past movements and investigating whether he could be linked to unsolved murders. The case of Jessie Earl was one of the main cases that Operation Anagram reinvestigated.

Tobin had lived in the area at the time of her murder, and Earl fitted in with the kind of victims Tobin attacked. Earl was known to have been nervous about a man she had met while previously out walking, and had reportedly described meeting a middle-aged Scottish man near the same spot her body was found. In the 2022 inquest into her death it was discovered that one of her last conversations with her mother had been about meeting this man on Beachy Head, when she also commented "I wish men would be prepared to be just friends."

Tobin could also be specifically placed in Eastbourne at the time, as he was discovered to have had links to Holy Trinity Church in Eastbourne, and it is believed he worked as a handyman at the church, as a Scot named Peter was known to be working there in 1980. Shortly after the discovery of Earl's body became public knowledge in 1989, Tobin hurriedly moved with his wife and child a great distance to Bathgate, Scotland, without prior informing his wife of these plans, which suggested he had an underlying reason to suddenly leave the area. This was notably similar to how Tobin had suddenly moved a long way from Bathgate to Margate in 1991, shortly after he had murdered 15-year-old Vicky Hamilton in Bathgate, which showed that he had a habit of moving across the country to avoid being detected for crimes he had committed. This was further suggested to be the case in Earl's murder as Tobin was found to have checked into a hospital in Glasgow a few days after she was killed, which again fitted his habit of moving as far away as possible after committing a murder. When Earl was found, her bra had also been used to tie her hands, and Tobin was known to have tied Vicky Hamilton's hands with her bra when he murdered her.

In Mark Williams-Thomas's book Hunting Killers, he stated that although Tobin buried his known murder victims, he also carried out merely opportunistic crimes like Earl's case appeared to be. In 1994 he trapped two neighbouring 14-year-old girls in his flat before turning on the gas taps and leaving them for dead, indicating he carried out disorganised, random attacks and could have done so on Earl as he walked past her on Beachy Head.

As part of Operation Anagram, police took DNA samples from Earl's parents and from her clothing, hoping to find a match with Tobin's clothes or possessions. However, police were unable to find enough evidence to charge Tobin with Earl's murder. A DNA link between Tobin and Earl's body could not be established through modern forensic techniques due to the key forensic evidence being destroyed by police in 1997.

=== Louise Kay links ===
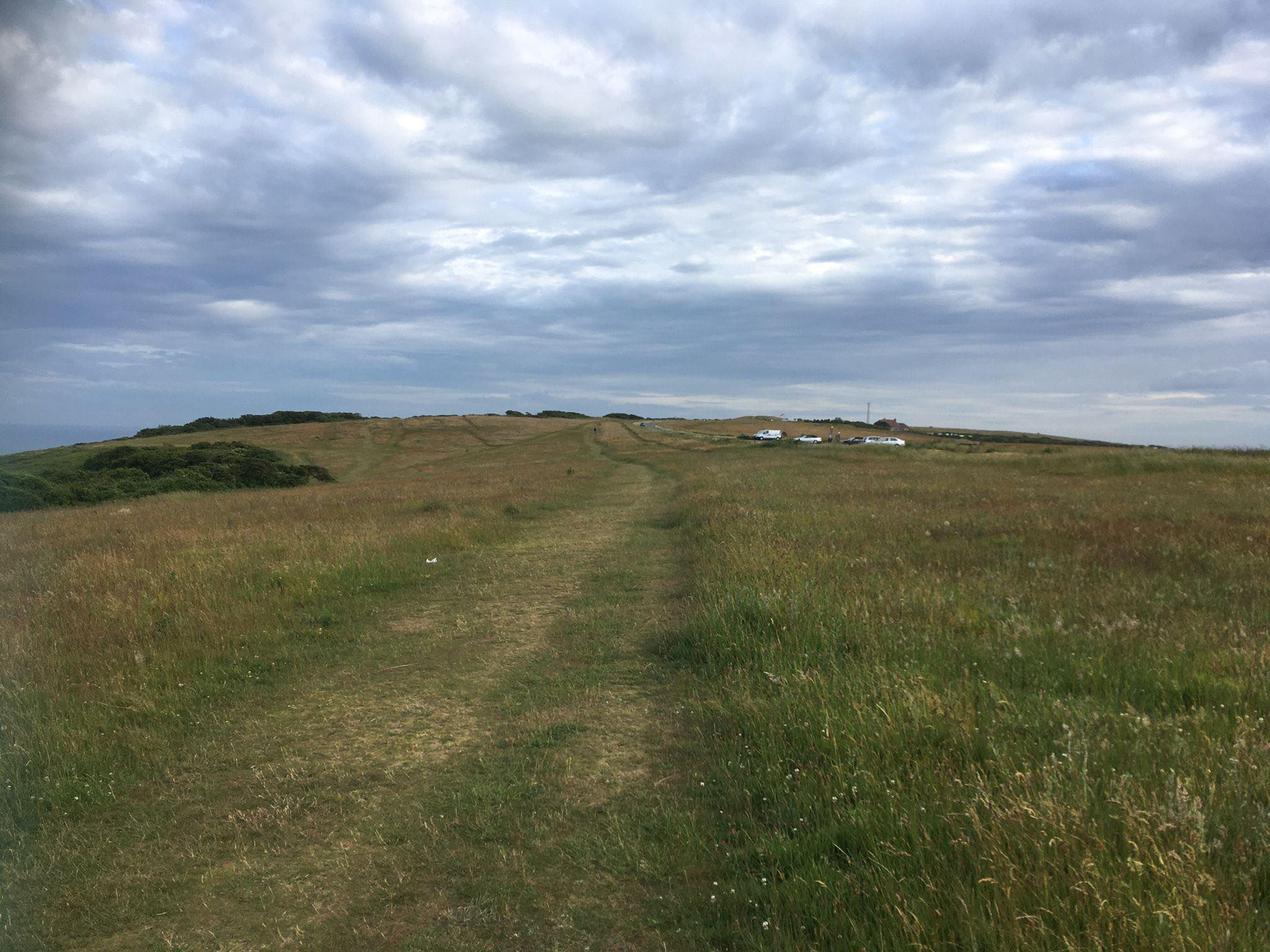
The top of Beachy Head, looking from near the spot Earl's body was found.

Apparently linked to Earl's murder and a similar case Operation Anagram investigated was the disappearance of 18-year-old Louise Kay from the same town of Eastbourne in 1988, a case which bore notable similarities to Earl's murder. Not only had both young women last been seen in Eastbourne, but Kay's last known location was also at Beachy Head, where Earl's remains would be found only a year later. Kay had been out with friends the evening she disappeared and ended the night by dropping her friend off by car at her house in Eastbourne, saying she was going to spend the night sleeping in her car on Beachy Head as she often did. Kay has never been found.

As with Earl, Operation Anagram established that Tobin was also living in the area at the time of Kay's disappearance, and it was discovered that he was working in a hotel in Eastbourne. Kay's distinctive Ford Fiesta, which was gold with a white door, that she was driving that night disappeared with her and has never been found, and Anagram established that Tobin was selling a small hand-painted car after Kay's disappearance. Kay had also met an unknown Scottish man in Eastbourne a few days before she vanished, who had given her money to buy petrol. Some of Tobin's former homes in Brighton were searched in 2010 in the belief that Kay may have been buried there, although she was not found.

In 2018, investigative reporter Mark Williams-Thomas released a documentary as part of his The Investigator: A British Crime Story series, in which he asserted that the cases of Earl and Kay were likely linked and that both women were victims of Tobin. In criminologist David Wilson's 2012 episode of Killers Behind Bars: The Untold Story that centred on Tobin's involvement in Earl's murder, Kay was also briefly brought up. Operation Anagram's lead officer, Detective Superintendent David Swindle, told Williams-Thomas in the 2018 The Investigator documentary that he believes Tobin murdered Kay.

== Subsequent developments ==
In 2018, Sussex Police stated that they had "no evidence implicating Tobin or any other named or known individual" in Earl's murder. By this point they had no open lines of enquiry, but they were reviewing the case every two years. Earl's parents believe that Peter Tobin could be responsible for her murder. In 2022, police gathered DNA from Earl's parents and checked it against "trophies" and other evidence collected by David Fuller, a double killer who had recently been convicted of killing two women in Tunbridge Wells in 1987. However, no links were found.

=== New inquest and re-classification of case as murder ===
"A third-party perpetrator used the brassiere to restrain Jessie by the wrists and had intentionally killed her by means unknown."

— James Healey-Pratt, the coroner who conducted the second inquest on Earl's case in 2022 which formally classified Earl's death as murder

Earl's parents asked the Attorney General to open a new inquest in June 2020. They stated that her body had been found naked and that they had "always known it was murder." In November 2020, the Solicitor General gave permission to appeal the verdict for a fresh inquest. The Rt Hon Michael Ellis QC MP said "I have concluded the initial investigation was insufficient and further lines of inquiry should have been pursued. It is in the interest of justice the application for a new inquest be heard by the High Court." In December 2021, the request for a new inquest was approved by the High Court.

The second inquest into Earl's murder opened in May 2022, and formally concluded that her death was as a result of unlawful killing by murder. The hearing heard that Earl was "probably" tied to a tree and "possibly" sexually assaulted. An officer who had been involved in the initial investigation testified that she "never had any doubt" Earl had been murdered. The coroner, James Healey-Pratt, criticised the original police investigation and highlighted a number of flaws, pointing to the fact that a police report made when she disappeared in 1980 concluded she must have committed suicide due to "pressure of exams" and "depression over a number of allergies" she suffered. Healey-Pratt said that such assumptions would have led to "less resources being expended" on investigating the missing person's case, and stated that "In other words, it would have a chilling effect on police efforts to investigate the disappearance of Jessie." The coroner concluded that the report treating her death as suicide was "wrong and contrary to evidence". He further highlighted one of the last conversations Jessie had with her mother in May 1980, in which Jessie described meeting a middle-aged man during one of her regular walks near Beachy Head. She had told her mother after the incident "I wish men would be prepared to be just friends." Concluding, the coroner said that Earl's parents had been the victims of "substantial injustice".

=== Sussex Police response ===
Sussex Police's chief constable Jo Shiner responded to the result of the new inquest by stating that she fully accepted the "historic failures of Sussex Police in this case" and accepting that "the police investigations in 1980 and 1989 were inadequate, with some aspects wholly inadequate." She commented that the investigation into the case remained open and she committed to "ensuring any new lines of enquiry are effectively investigated".

== Documentaries ==
Jessie Earl's death is investigated in a 2012 episode of criminologist David Wilson's Killers Behind Bars: The Untold Story. Wilson concluded that Tobin was likely responsible for Earl's murder. Earl's case also features as part of a 2018 episode of investigative journalist Mark Williams-Thomas's documentary series The Investigator: A British Crime Story. Williams-Thomas concluded that Earl's death could be linked to Tobin and that it was linked to the disappearance of Louise Kay from Eastbourne in 1988. In September 2018, The Telegraph newspaper published a 17-minute mini-documentary on the case, which was released on YouTube.

== See also ==
- Death of Helen Bailey, similarly controversial 1975 case
- Murder of Patsy Morris
- List of solved missing person cases (1980s)
- John Bodkin Adams, another serial killer who was living in Eastbourne at the time
- Murder of Lindsay Rimer, similar unsolved 1994 case in which a girl who disappeared from Yorkshire was found a year later in a nearby canal

== Sources ==
- Williams-Thomas, Mark (2019). "Victims of a Serial Killer?". Hunting Killers: Britain's top crime investigator reveals how he solves the unsolvable. UK: Bantam Press. ISBN 9781473564190.
- Wilson, David; Harrison, Paul (2010). "Cold Cases". The Lost British Serial Killer: Closing the Case on Peter Tobin and Bible John. London: Sphere. pp. 222–224. ISBN 978-0-751-54232-5.
