= I Dreamed a Dream (disambiguation) =

"I Dreamed a Dream" is a song from the musical Les Misérables.

I Dreamed a Dream may also refer to:

- I Dreamed a Dream (album), an album by Susan Boyle
- I Dreamed a Dream (musical), a jukebox musical by Alan McHugh and Elaine C. Smith, based on the life of Susan Boyle
- I Dreamed a Dream: The Susan Boyle Story, a television program

== See also ==
- Dream a Dream, a 2000 album by Charlotte Church
