= Syco Entertainment =

British entertainment company

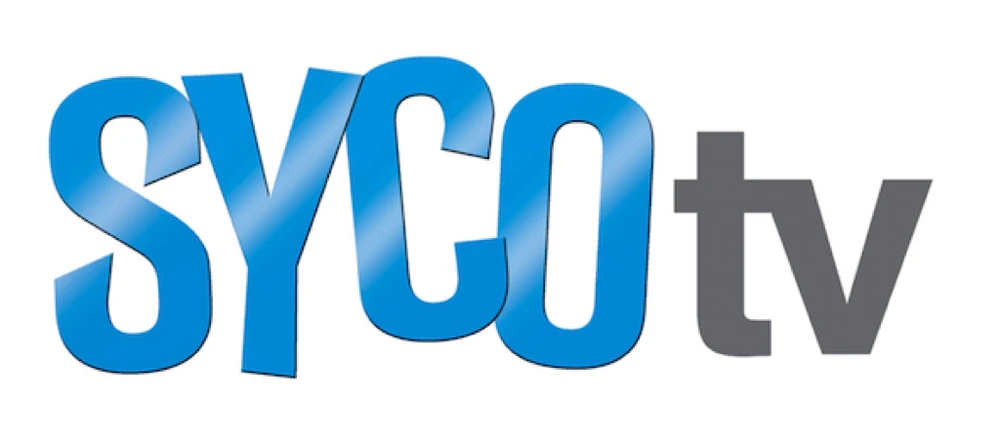
- Logo used from 2003 to 2013
- Type: Private
- Industry: Entertainment
- Predecessor: S Records; Syco Television
- Founded: 2005; 21 years ago
- Founders: Simon Cowell; Sony Music
- Headquarters: London, England, U.K.
- Area served: Worldwide
- Key people: Nigel Hall (Global Head of TV)
- Products: Television programs
- Owner: Simon Cowell; Sony Music Entertainment UK (2009–2020)

Syco Entertainment, formerly Syco Music, Syco Television and Syco Film, is a British media entertainment and production company, headquartered in London, founded and owned by British entrepreneur and record executive Simon Cowell. The company focuses on TV production. The company was formed in 2005 through Sony Music Entertainment entering a joint venture by purchasing Cowell's shares of his record label S Records and television company Syco Television. In 2009, Sony and Cowell entered a joint venture agreement that covered the joint ownership of Syco's television formats, which include the Got Talent and The X Factor franchises. Until 2020, the company operated television and music projects with Sony Music labels around the world and television production company Fremantle. It employs a staff of more than 50 in offices in London and Los Angeles, and manages a string of television and music brands through partnerships with the label Sony Music and the television production company.

Retail billionaire Sir Philip Green, a close friend of Cowell, served as an advisor to the company until 2018. Through its divisions: Music, Film and TV, Syco has produced the Got Talent and The X Factor franchises which encompassed local versions in numerous countries and have launched the careers of One Direction, Leona Lewis, Little Mix, Susan Boyle and Fifth Harmony amongst others. Syco have also been instrumental in the careers of artists not originating from its franchises, including Il Divo and Westlife. It has also produced films such as One Direction: This Is Us (2013) and The X Factor parody musical, I Can't Sing! (2014). In July 2020, Cowell bought Sony Music's stake in Syco Entertainment, with exception for Syco Music. The record label and its artists and back catalogue were retained by Sony Music and subsequently absorbed. TV rights and assets were transferred to the newly created Syco Entertainment Ltd, which is owned 100% by Cowell.

== Formation and history ==
Cowell founded S Records whilst employed by BMG back in 2004. The label oversaw music by Robson & Jerome, Five, Westlife and Teletubbies. A year later, BMG, now named Sony BMG, bought Cowell's share in both Syco Music and Syco Television. In 2010, a new company was formed as a 50/50 partnership between Cowell and Sony Music, keeping the name Syco but titled as Syco Entertainment. In 2015, it was announced that the Syco Entertainment joint venture would be extended for a further 6 years. Retail Billionaire Sir Philip Green, a close friend of Cowell, served as an advisor to the company until 2018.

It was initially divided into three units: Syco Music, Syco Television and Syco Film. A few years later in July 2020, it was announced that Cowell had agreed to buy out Sony Music's stake in the company, with Sony Music retaining the company's artist roster and catalogue.

== Operations ==
Syco's television operations were founded originally as Syco Television, primarily operating in the UK and US with key franchises The X Factor and Got Talent. It was launched by Simon Cowell in 2003. Following Cowell's purchase of Sony Music Entertainment's stake in the business in 2020, Cowell went on to expand his existing TV arrangements with NBCUniversal in 2021. The new deal will see a range of non-scripted series for the streaming service Peacock developed (though this does not include Walk the Line). As part of the deal, Cowell will appear as a judge on AGT: Extreme, a spin-off from America's Got Talent.

=== The X Factor ===
The X Factor, which launched in September 2004, was one of the most popular television shows in the UK. Syco and Fremantle Media launched The X Factor USA in September 2011, which averaged 12 million viewers and a 4.0 rating in the adults 18–49 demographic in its first season, leading FOX to nightly wins on Wednesdays and Thursdays and topping all other fall season reality competition.

Internationally, The X Factor is produced individually in 41 countries including major markets like France, the Netherlands, Indonesia and Australia. Additionally, The X Factor USA is screened in 166 countries around the world.

=== Got Talent ===
Britain's Got Talent consistently tops UK ratings when it is broadcast in April, May and June. In 2009, nearly 20 million people (approximately one third of the UK population) tuned into the series 3 final to see Diversity crowned winners.

America's Got Talent matched a series high 4.6 rating amongst adults 18–49 in the summer of 2011 for its sixth season. Since launching in 2006, America's Got Talent has consistently been the most watched show of the summer in the US and topped the ratings in the key adults 18–49 demographic.

=== Other projects ===
Syco produces other shows outside its key brands. In 2011, ITV series Red or Black? was met with mixed reaction. Syco were also behind American Inventor which ran for two seasons on ABC and the unsuccessful Celebrity Duets on Fox. In addition to its major formats, Syco also produces entertainment specials. This includes I Dreamed a Dream: The Susan Boyle Story, which broke ratings records in the US on TV Guide network and scored 10 million viewers on ITV in the UK. In 2013, Syco and Optomen launched ITV series Food Glorious Food, which aired on Wednesday evenings in the UK.

Syco Entertainment were the executive producers of the film One Direction: This Is Us from director Morgan Spurlock and One Direction: Where We Are from director Paul Dugdale, which follows the life of pop sensations One Direction. The band had come third in the 2010 UK X Factor series, before being signed to Syco.

In January 2013, Syco set up a new London-based television division called Over The Top Productions. This production company was run by Syco's Global Head of Television, Nigel Hall, and would be responsible for formats such as ITV's Rolling In It.

In July 2016, The Investigator: A British Crime Story was a co-production between Syco & ITV which was broadcast for four consecutive weeks on ITV at 9pm. The series was inspired by Simons Cowell's interest in the crime series Making a Murderer, and The Jinx. The Investigator: A British Crime Story was broadcast globally via Netflix until 21 August 2021. The series looked in to the murder of Carole Packman who disappeared from her family home in Bournemouth in June 1985. Carole's husband, Russell Causley was convicted of her murder in 1996 and again in 2004 following a successful appeal.

=== You Generation ===
In March 2013, Syco in partnership with YouTube, launched The You Generation channel which is listed as the 'world's first global audition'.

=== La Banda ===
In May 2014, Syco and Univision announced an upcoming TV show called La Banda which will focus on searching contestants from Hispanic America to find the "ultimate Latino boy band" with the winner receiving a recording contract for Sony Music Latin and Syco.

=== I Can't Sing! ===
2014 saw Syco launch I Can't Sing!, a parody musical based on The X Factor. After technical issues and poor critical reception, the show was pulled from the West End of London less than two months after it opened. Cowell later said of the venture that occasionally things did not work out and that they had been too ambitious trying to launch a new show in the West End.

== Shows produced ==
=== Current productions ===
- America's Got Talent (2006–present)
- Romania Got Talent (2011–present)

=== Former productions ===
- American Inventor (2006–2007)
- Britain's Got Talent (2007–2025)
- America's Got Talent: The Champions (2019–2020)
- America's Got Talent: Extreme (2022)
- America's Got Talent: All-Stars (2023)
- America's Got Talent: Fantasy League (2024)
- Britain's Got More Talent (2007–2019)
- Britain's Got Talent: The Champions (2019)
- The X Factor (2004–2018)
- The Xtra Factor (also called The Xtra Factor Live) (2004–2016)
- The X Factor: Battle of the Stars (2006)
- The X Factor: Celebrity (2019)
- The X Factor: The Band (2019)
- Celebrity Duets (2006)
- Grease Is the Word (2007)
- I Dreamed a Dream: The Susan Boyle Story (2009)
- Red or Black? (2011–2012)
- That Dog Can Dance (2012)
- Food Glorious Food (2013)
- The You Generation (2013–2014)
- La Banda (2015–2016)
- Planet's Got Talent (2015–2016)
- Your Song (2017)
- The Greatest Dancer (2019–2020)
- Walk the Line (2021)
- X Factor Romania (2011–2018: 2020–2021: 2025)

=== Screen and stage ===
- One Direction: This Is Us (2013)
- I Can't Sing! The X Factor Musical (2014)
- One Direction: Where We Are (2014)

== See also ==
- Syco Music - spun out from Syco Entertainment in July 2020.
- The Investigator: A British Crime Story (2016–2018)
- Murder of Carole Packman
