= The Investigator: A British Crime Story =

- Genre: Documentary
- Created by: Simon Cowell
- Directed by: Hugh Ballantyne; Adam Wimpenny
- Starring: Mark Williams-Thomas
- Country of origin: United Kingdom
- Original language: English
- No. of series: 2
- No. of episodes: 7

Production
- Executive producers: Luke Dolan; Alexander Gardiner; Nigel Hall; Michael Jochnowitz; Simon Cowell
- Producer: Adam Morane-Griffiths
- Editors: Phil Bowman; Damien Knight
- Running time: 50 minutes
- Production company: Syco Entertainment

Original release
- Network: ITV
- Release: 14 July 2016 – 19 April 2018

The Investigator: A British Crime Story is a British television crime documentary series, created and produced by Simon Cowell, and presented by Mark Williams-Thomas. The series, broadcast on ITV, is often described as "Britain's answer to Making a Murderer", and was inspired by Cowell's viewing of the documentary series The Jinx.

The first series, comprising four episodes, first broadcast in July and August 2016, focused on the murder of Carole Packman, who disappeared in 1985. The second series, comprising three episodes, first broadcast in April 2018 and looks into a number of unsolved disappearances and murders that could be linked to convicted serial killers Peter Tobin and Angus Sinclair.

The series also features a number of dramatised scenes filmed to portray key events in each of the cases featured, drawing inspiration from the reconstructive element of Crimewatch. The series was broadcast on Netflix internationally until the 21st August 2021.

== Production ==
With help from fellow investigators, Williams-Thomas re-investigates each of the cases featured by speaking with relatives of the victims, eye-witnesses and police officers involved with the original investigation. Notably, Williams-Thomas' re-investigation of the Carole Packman murder unearthed enough significant new information to warrant Dorset Police to re-open the case and appoint a new SIO to undertake a full review.

Similarly, in the second series, Williams-Thomas' interviewed eyewitnesses involved with the cases of three women whom police suspect Angus Sinclair may have murdered, and for the first time, following new evidence uncovered by Williams-Thomas, multiple witnesses were able to place Sinclair's vehicle at the scenes of crime.

== Cast ==
- Mark Williams-Thomas as Himself

=== Series 1 (2016) ===
- Rick Warden as Russell Causley
- Tanya Winsor as Carole Packman
- Frances Millar as Patricia Causley
- Alice Harding as Sam Gillingham
- Jason Allen as DC Paul Donnell
- David France as Anthony Hackett-Jones

=== Series 2 (2018) ===
- David Bannerman as Peter Tobin
- Billy Machin as Young Peter Tobin
- Polly Lewis as Margaret Moutney
- Eve Perry as Louise Kay
- Danielle Bird as Jessie Earl

== Episodes ==
=== Series 1 (2016) ===
No. overall	Title	British air date	UK viewers (million)
1	"Episode 1"	14 July 2016	3.65
Williams-Thomas looks into the disappearance of Carole Packman, a housewife, and mother who vanished in June 1985 just days after visiting a solicitor to petition for divorce from her husband, Russell. Having been convicted of her murder despite the lack of any physical evidence or a body, Russell has served more than twenty years in jail, and in that time, has refused to make contact with his daughter, Sam. Williams-Thomas offers to help Sam find the answers that she is desperately seeking about what really happened to her mother and makes a surprising discovery involving a possible sighting just months after she disappeared.
2	"Episode 2"	21 July 2016	3.74
Williams-Thomas heads to Canada to investigate reports that someone using Carole's name began working in the Canadian Aerospace industry less than twelve months after her disappearance. He discovers that Russell's mistress, Patricia, applied for a work permit under Carole's name and was later deported back to the United Kingdom after being caught out by Canadian immigration officials. Williams-Thomas also investigates Russell's attempt to fake his own death at sea in 1993 to claim on a life insurance policy.
3	"Episode 3"	28 July 2016	3.06
Williams-Thomas speaks with officers involved in the original police investigation and uncovers evidence which suggests that Patricia posed as Carole on more than one occasion, even going as far as forging her signature to sign over Carole's half of the family home to Russell. Williams-Thomas speaks with Carole's grandson, Neil, who has obtained letters sent by Russell from prison which offer a full confession to the murder, and tests out a theory that police have seemingly dismissed.
4	"Episode 4"	4 August 2016	3.32
Williams-Thomas enlists the help of an archaeologist to undertake an excavation in the garden of the family home in an attempt to determine whether or not Russell's claims of burning his wife's body are true. Williams-Thomas also meets with former crown prosecutor Nazir Afzal to find out if there is significant evidence for the police to charge Patricia with fraud.

=== Series 2 (2018) ===
No. overall	Title	British air date	UK viewers (million)
5	"Episode 1"	5 April 2018	3.08
Williams-Thomas reinvestigates the disappearance of Louise Kay, who disappeared after a night out in her hometown of Eastbourne in 1988. Williams-Thomas links her disappearance to serial killer Peter Tobin, who was living and working in Eastbourne at the time. He also investigates the disappearance and murder of Jessie Earl and tries to identify other possible victims that could be linked to Tobin.
6	"Episode 2"	12 April 2018	N/A
Williams-Thomas heads to Glasgow to investigate the murders of three young women in 1977: Anna Kenny, Hilda McCauley, and Agnes Cooney. Williams-Thomas investigates possible links to convicted murder Angus Sinclair, currently in prison after being convicted of raping and murdering two women at an Edinburgh pub, The World's End. After uncovering significant new evidence linking Sinclair to the murders, Williams-Thomas speaks to a number of eyewitnesses interviewed in the original investigation, one of whom identifies Sinclair as the man she saw walking away from one of the murder sites forty years ago.
7	"Episode 3"	19 April 2018	N/A
Williams-Thomas' investigation into Angus Sinclair takes an interesting turn when he looks into the murder of Frances Barker, whose killing bears all the hallmarks of Sinclair's MO. Thomas Ross-Young, a prolific sex-offender, was convicted of the murder, but Williams-Thomas looks into the possibility that Sinclair and Ross-Young were acquainted and could have worked together.

== See also ==
- Chris Clark, another investigative journalist who has created documentaries on unsolved crimes in the UK
- Murder of Helen Gorrie, unsolved case that was mentioned in an episode of The Investigator
