= Peter Tobin =

Scottish serial killer (1946–2022)

- Police mugshot of Tobin, 2006
- Born: Peter Britton Tobin; 27 August 1946; Johnstone, Renfrewshire, Scotland
- Died: 8 October 2022 (aged 76); Edinburgh, Scotland
- Other names: Up to 40 aliases, including: Peter Wilson; James Kelly; Paul Semple; John Tobin; Peter Proban; Pat McLaughlin
- Occupation: Handyman
- Spouses: Margaret Mountney (m. 1969; div. 1971) Sylvia Jefferies (m. 1973; div. 1976) Cathy Wilson (m. 1989; div. 1993)
- Children: 3
- Convictions: Burglary, forgery, murder, rape
- Penalty: Life imprisonment (whole life order)

Details
- Victims: 3+
- Span of crimes: 10 February 1991 – 26 September 2006
- Imprisoned at: HM Prison Edinburgh

Peter Britton Tobin (27 August 1946 – 8 October 2022) was a Scottish serial killer and sex offender who served a whole life order for three murders committed between 1991 and 2006. Police also investigated Tobin over the deaths and disappearances of other young women and girls.

Tobin served ten years in prison for the rape, buggery and indecent assault of two girls in 1993, following which he was released in 2004. Three years later he was sentenced to life with a minimum of twenty-one years for the rape and murder of Angelika Kluk in Glasgow in 2006. The remains of two teenagers who went missing in 1991 were later found at his former home in Margate, Kent. Tobin was convicted of the murder of Vicky Hamilton in December 2008, resulting in his minimum sentence being increased to thirty years, and of the murder of Dinah McNicol in December 2009. Tobin spent his entire sentence at HM Prison Edinburgh.

Tobin was diagnosed as a psychopath by a senior psychologist following his third conviction. There has been speculation that Tobin might be connected with the unsolved Bible John murders of the late 1960s, but police eventually eliminated him from the investigation.

== Early and personal life ==
Peter Britton Tobin was born in Johnstone, Renfrewshire, Scotland, on 27 August 1946, the youngest of eight children to Daniel and Marjorie Tobin. He had four older sisters and three older brothers. Tobin was a difficult child and in 1953, when he was seven years old, he was sent to an approved school. He reportedly joined the French Foreign Legion but later deserted. Tobin later served a sentence in a borstal and in 1970 was convicted and imprisoned in England for burglary and forgery. Tobin moved to Brighton, Sussex, England, where he married his seventeen-year-old girlfriend, Margaret Mountney, a clerk and typist, in August 1969. The couple separated after a year and Mountney divorced Tobin in 1971. In 1973, Tobin married a nurse, thirty-year-old Sylvia Jefferies. The couple had a son named Ian later that year and a daughter named Claire in 1975; she died soon after birth. This second marriage lasted until 1976, when Sylvia left with their son.

Tobin had a relationship with Cathy Wilson; the couple married in 1989, with a son named Daniel born later that year. In 1990, they moved to Bathgate, West Lothian, Scotland. Wilson left Tobin in 1990 and moved back to Portsmouth, Hampshire, England, where she had grown up. All three wives later gave similar accounts of falling for a charming, well-dressed psychopath who turned violent and displayed sadistic behavior during their marriages. In May 1991, Tobin moved to Margate, Kent, and, in 1993, to Havant, Hampshire, to be near his son.

== Convictions ==
=== Rape, buggery and indecent assault of two girls ===
On 4 August 1993, Tobin attacked two fourteen-year-old girls at his flat in Leigh Park in Havant, after they went to visit a neighbour who was not at home. They stopped at Tobin's flat and asked if they could wait there. After holding them at knife-point and forcing them to drink strong cider and vodka, Tobin sexually assaulted and raped the girls, stabbing one of them whilst his younger son was present. He then turned on the gas cooker without lighting it and left the girls for dead, but both survived the attack.

To avoid arrest, Tobin went into hiding and joined the Jesus Fellowship, a religious sect in Coventry, under a false name. He was later captured in Brighton after his blue Austin Metro car was discovered there. On 18 May 1994, at Winchester Crown Court, Tobin entered a plea of guilty and received a fourteen-year prison sentence. In 2004, Tobin, aged 58, was released from prison and returned to Paisley in Renfrewshire.

=== Angelika Kluk murder ===
In September 2006, Tobin was working as a church handyman at St Patrick's Church in Anderston, Glasgow. He had assumed the name "Pat McLaughlin" to avoid detection, as he was still on the Violent and Sex Offender Register following his 1994 convictions. An arrest warrant had been issued for Tobin in November 2005 after he moved from Paisley without notifying police, but he was not discovered until he became a suspect in the murder of twenty-three-year-old Angelika Kluk at the church. In May 2007, Tobin received a further thirty-month sentence for breaching the terms of the register.

Kluk, a student from Poland, was staying at the presbytery of St Patrick's Church, where she worked as a cleaner to help finance her Scandinavian studies course at the University of Gdańsk. She was last seen alive in the company of Tobin on 24 September and is thought to have been attacked by him in the garage attached to the presbytery. Kluk was beaten, raped and stabbed, and her body was concealed in an underground chamber beneath the floor near the confessional of the church. Forensic evidence suggested that she was still alive when she was placed under the floorboards. The investigation was led by Detective Superintendent David Swindle of Strathclyde Police. Police found her body on 29 September, and Tobin was arrested in London shortly afterwards. He had been admitted to hospital under a false name and with a fictitious complaint.

A six-week trial took place at the High Court of Justiciary in Edinburgh, between 23 March and 4 May 2007. The trial judge was Lord Menzies, the prosecution was led by Advocate Depute Dorothy Bain and the defence by Donald Findlay QC. Tobin was found guilty of raping and murdering Kluk and was sentenced to life imprisonment, to serve a minimum of twenty-one years. In sentencing Tobin, Judge Lord Menzies described him as "an evil man."

=== Vicky Hamilton murder ===
In June 2007, Tobin's former house in Bathgate was searched in connection with the disappearance of fifteen-year-old Vicky Hamilton, who was last seen on 10 February 1991 as she waited for a bus home to Redding, near Falkirk. Tobin is believed to have left Bathgate for Margate a few weeks after her disappearance. On 21 July 2007, Lothian and Borders Police announced that they had arrested a man but did not release his identity.

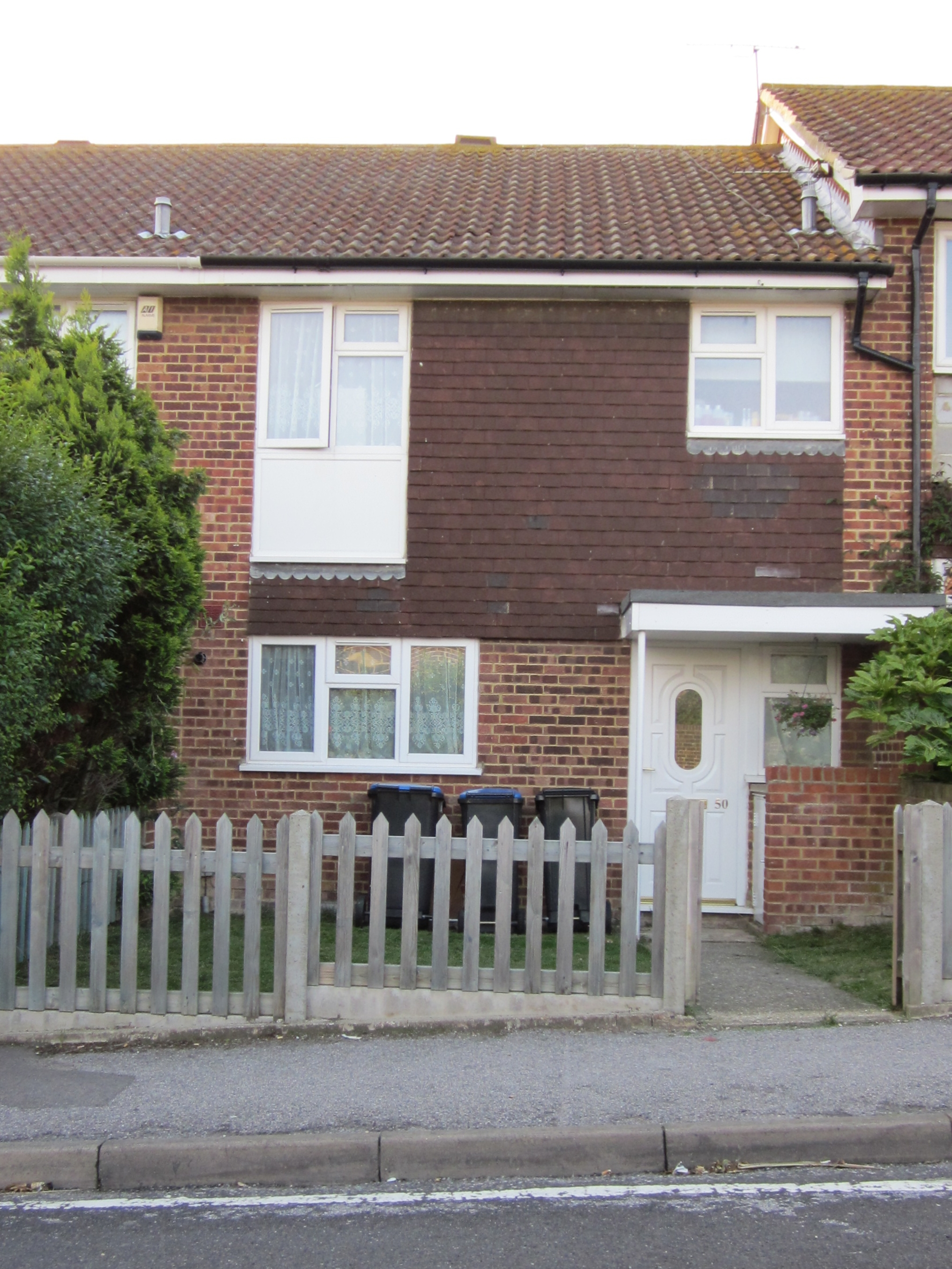
Tobin's house at 50 Irvine Drive, Margate. The bodies of Hamilton and McNicol were found in the garden.

The investigation later led to a forensic search of a house in Southsea in early October 2007, where Tobin is believed to have lived shortly after leaving Bathgate. On 14 November 2007, Lothian and Borders Police confirmed that human remains found in the back garden of 50 Irvine Drive, a house in Margate occupied by Tobin in 1991, were those of Hamilton.

In November 2008, Tobin was tried at the High Court in Dundee for Hamilton's murder. He was again defended by Findlay, while the prosecution was led by the Solicitor General for Scotland, Frank Mulholland QC. The prosecution case went beyond the circumstantial evidence of Tobin having lived at the two houses in Bathgate and Margate in 1991 and included eyewitness testimony of suspicious behaviour by Tobin in Bathgate; evidence to destroy his alibi; and DNA and fingerprints left on a dagger found in his former house, on Hamilton's purse and on the sheeting in which her body was wrapped.

After a month-long trial, Tobin was convicted of Hamilton's murder on 2 December 2008. When sentencing Tobin to life imprisonment, the judge said:

You stand convicted of the truly evil abduction and murder of a vulnerable young girl in 1991 and thereafter of attempting to defeat the ends of justice in various ways over an extended period... Yet again you have shown yourself to be unfit to live in a decent society. It is hard for me to convey the loathing and revulsion that ordinary people will feel for what you have done... I fix the minimum period which you must spend in custody at 30 years. Had it been open to me I would have made that period run consecutive to the 21-year custodial period that you are already serving.

On 11 December 2008, Tobin gave notice to court officials that he intended to appeal. The appeal was dropped in March 2009.

=== Dinah McNicol murder ===
Dinah McNicol, an eighteen-year-old sixth former from Tillingham, Essex, was last seen alive on 5 August 1991, hitchhiking home with a male friend from a music festival at Liphook in Hampshire. While hitchhiking, they accepted a lift from a man. McNicol's friend was dropped off at Junction 8 of the M25, near Reigate, while McNicol stayed in the car with the driver. She was never seen again. After her disappearance, regular withdrawals were made from her building society account at cash machines in Hampshire and Sussex. This was out of character for McNicol, who had told friends and family that she intended to use the money to travel or further her education.

In late 2007, Essex Police reopened the investigation into McNicol's disappearance, following new leads. On 16 November 2007, a second body was found at 50 Irvine Drive in Margate, later confirmed by police to be that of McNicol. On 1 September 2008, the Crown Prosecution Service served a summons on Tobin's solicitors, accusing him of her murder. This new trial began in June 2009 but was postponed and the jury discharged in the following month after the judge ruled that Tobin was not fit to stand trial pending surgery.

The case resumed on 14 December 2009 at Chelmsford Crown Court. On 16 December, after the defence had offered no evidence, a jury found Tobin guilty of McNicol's murder after deliberating for less than fifteen minutes, and Tobin subsequently received his third life sentence.

== Operation Anagram ==
Operation Anagram was a nationwide police investigation into Tobin's life and movements. The investigation started in 2006, after his first murder conviction, led by Detective Superintendent Swindle of Strathclyde Police, and increased in intensity in December 2009 after Tobin's third conviction. It aimed to prove Tobin's possible involvement in thirteen unsolved murders, including the three victims of the unidentified serial killer Bible John. Through the HOLMES 2 database, police forces across the UK were involved in the operation, investigating the possibility of Tobin's connection to dozens of murders and disappearances of teenage girls and young women. Tobin is reported to have claimed forty-eight victims in boasts made in prison.

Swindle, speaking after Tobin's 2006 conviction for the murder of Kluk, said that his age and modus operandi caused speculation that he may be a serial killer, as did interviews with Tobin. Anagram led to the discovery of the bodies of Hamilton and McNicol. It is believed that as of December 2009, detectives across the UK were following up on up to 1,400 lines of inquiry. As part of their renewed inquiries, police were especially interested in tracing the owners of jewelry items found at his residences. In 2009, police released photographs of the thirty-two pieces of jewelry that they found which were in Tobin's possession between 1991 and 2006, which authorities believed to be mementoes Tobin collected of his crimes. In July 2010, it was reported that officers working on Anagram had narrowed their review down to nine unsolved murders and disappearances. The operation was wound down in June 2011, having failed to identify any more victims.

=== Louise Kay investigation ===
Tobin was linked to the disappearance of eighteen-year-old Louise Kay from Beachy Head in Eastbourne in 1988. Kay was never seen again after telling a friend she was going to sleep in her car at Beachy Head after an evening with friends, something she had done previously. Neither Kay nor her gold Ford Fiesta car with a white door have ever been seen since. Operation Anagram established that Tobin was working in a hotel in Eastbourne at the time Kay disappeared, and learned that he was selling a small hand-painted car after she vanished. Tobin had a history dealing cars for an auction company, and also had links to scrapyards. It is thought Tobin could have re-painted Kay's car and then sold it on to hide his crime. Kay had met a mysterious 'Scottish man' shortly before she disappeared, and it was known that he had given Kay money for petrol for her car. Kay's case was featured on the BBC's Crimewatch in 1994.

Swindle stated in 2018 that he believes that Tobin killed Kay. Detectives investigated whether he was responsible but could never prove his involvement. At the time of the disappearance, Tobin owned the property 22 Windlesham Road in Brighton; the house and its garden have never been searched for remains. Operation Anagram ordered the search of two houses that Tobin had owned in Brighton in relation to the search for Kay but did not search the Windlesham Road property. Former police officer and investigator Mark Williams-Thomas stated in a documentary in 2018, part of his The Investigator: A British Crime Story series, that he believes the body of Kay is still buried in the garden of the property.

=== Jessie Earl investigation ===
The murder of 22-year-old Jessie Earl in 1980 was also reinvestigated by Operation Anagram. Earl had also disappeared from Eastbourne, and her skeleton was found in 1989 concealed in dense shrubland on Beachy Head, a place she would often take walks and the same place from which Kay had vanished in 1988. Earl's bra had been tied around her hands to restrain her. As with Kay, Tobin lived in the area and possibly worked as a handyman at Eastbourne's Holy Trinity Church at the time she disappeared.

Earl was known to have been nervous about a man she had met while previously out walking, and had described meeting a middle-aged Scottish man near the same spot where her body was found. Shortly after the discovery of Earl's body became public knowledge in 1989, Tobin abruptly moved to Bathgate with his wife and child, suggesting he had an underlying reason to suddenly leave the area. This was similar to how Tobin had suddenly moved to Margate in 1991, shortly after he had murdered Vicky Hamilton in Bathgate. This was further suggested to be the case in Earl's murder, as Tobin was found to have checked into a hospital in Glasgow a few days after she was killed, again fitting his habit of moving as far away as possible after committing a murder.

In 2012, criminologist David Wilson produced a documentary as part of his Killers Behind Bars: The Untold Story series, in which he made the case that Earl was a likely victim of Tobin. In Williams-Thomas's 2018 documentary on Louise Kay, he also supported the theory that Tobin could be responsible for Earl's death after linking her case to Kay's disappearance.

=== Other links investigated ===
Operation Anagram also investigated and in some cases disproved links between Tobin and other murders and disappearances, including:

- 13-year-old April Fabb, who disappeared on 8 April 1969 while cycling between Metton and Roughton in Norfolk, and has not been seen since. Although the case has also been linked to Robert Black, Black had no known links to Norfolk, whereas Tobin is known to have regularly holidayed in the region, often taking trips on bank holidays. Fabb vanished the day after the Easter Monday bank holiday. The date of her disappearance falls within the first and second Bible John murders. In 2009, Norfolk Police said that they had found no evidence to link Tobin to Fabb's disappearance or to any other unsolved case in the county.
- 37-year-old housewife and nurse Dorothea Meechan disappeared on her way home to Kirlandneuk Crescent on 28 February 1971, having attended a family party. She was found six weeks later raped and strangled and her nude body partially buried in the vicinity of a bridge spanning railway tracks between Clark Street and McClue Avenue in Renfrew, where Tobin grew up. Meechan's clothes and handbag were missing. Richard Coubrough, who died in 2008 at age 74, was found guilty of Meechan's murder on 2 July 1971. However, Coubrough denied committing the crime and always protested his innocence in the case. Tobin's former neighbours in the area were interviewed by police in 2008.
- The decapitated body of an unknown woman, believed to have been killed in early August, was found wrapped in a sheet near Swaffham, Norfolk, on 27 August 1974. The woman was never identified, but the sheet she was wrapped in was found to have been one of only six sheets sold by a Scottish company between 1962 and 1968, a period when Tobin was known to be living in Glasgow. Tobin had also used plastic sheeting to wrap up or hide the bodies of his established victims; he was known to have previously used a knife to dismember victims such as with Vicky Hamilton, and Dinah McNicol's legs had been bound in a similar way to the unknown victim's. After Tobin's convictions, the body was exhumed in a failed attempt to identify the woman or the killer. Norfolk Police say there are no links between Tobin and Norfolk cases, and police are working on the theory that the woman was a sex worker nicknamed "The Duchess" who went missing in 1974.
- 21-year-old Pamela Exall vanished on 30 August 1974 after going for a late-night walk on a beach near Snettisham. Because Tobin holidayed in Norfolk, police contacted his former wives to attempt to establish when and where he had visited the area, but police found no links and have ruled out a connection to Exall's disappearance or any other case in Norfolk. Jewellery recovered from Tobin's possession by Operation Anagram is thought to be similar to what Exall was wearing when she disappeared.
- On 30 March 1979, 17-year-old Yvette Anne Watson went missing from the David Rice Hospital mental health unit in Norwich where she was being treated for depression. She has not been seen since. In 2009, Norfolk Police said it had investigated the possibility that Watson may have been a victim of Tobin, but found no links. However, excerpts from Watson's diary include an entry on 20 March 1978, a year before she vanished, which made a reference to a "Mr Tobin."
- On 26 February 1980, 20-year-old Elizabeth McCabe was found strangled to death in Templeton Woods, Dundee. Her murder was included in a list of cases that Mark Williams-Thomas believed Tobin could not be ruled out from on a 2018 episode of his documentary series The Investigator: A British Crime Story. McCabe's case and that of 18-year-old Carol Lannen, who was found dead in March 1979 only 150 yards from where McCabe had been discovered a year before, was investigated by police as part of an investigation into murders committed by Angus Sinclair.
- 14-year-old Patricia "Patsy" Morris vanished on 16 June 1980 during a lunch break from her school in Feltham and was later found strangled to death in bushes nearby. In 2011, there was media speculation that her murder could be linked to Tobin, and Morris' father said he believed Tobin could be responsible. Although Morris' murder was reportedly re-investigated by Anagram, the case was subsequently linked to Levi Bellfield, as Morris was his childhood girlfriend at the time and he allegedly confessed to her murder in 2008.
- On 4 November 1981, the bludgeoned and strangled body of 16-year-old Pamela Hastie was found in Rannoch Woods in Johnstone, Renfrewshire. As she made her way through Rannoch Woods near her home, Pamela's attacker strangled her with a length of twine after striking her on the head with a piece of wood and dragging her into bushes. Hastie had been raped. Links to Tobin were investigated as Johnstone was Tobin's birthplace.
- At 9:00 a.m. on 11 September 1983, the fully clothed body of an unidentified white female was found in a ditch adjacent to a lay-by on the northbound carriageway of the A1 road, south of the Brampton Hut roundabout in Cambridgeshire. The body, which had several head wounds caused by a blunt object, was identified as that of Janice Weston, a 36-year-old solicitor from London and partner of a well-established firm based at Lincoln's Inn. Weston was last seen alive at her office the previous day. Her bloodstained silver Alfa Romeo was found four days later.
- 18-year-old mother of one, Nicola Payne disappeared on 14 December 1991 while walking to her parents' house in Coventry. In 2010, there was media speculation that Tobin was responsible for Payne's presumed murder. Tobin was known to have spent time in Coventry in the early nineties when hiding with a religious sect while on the run from police. Mark Williams-Thomas, who has been heavily involved in the Payne case, included Payne on a list of unsolved murders that he thought Tobin could not be ruled out from in a 2018 episode of his documentary series The Investigator: A British Crime Story, but subsequently stated that he does not believe that Tobin was responsible for her murder.
- 15-year-old Helen Gorrie left her house on 30 July 1992 at night to meet a man called "John" and was later found murdered in a nearby community centre in Horndean in Hampshire. She had been strangled and smothered with her own clothing. Gorrie's murder was included on Williams-Thomas's list of cases; he felt Tobin could not be ruled out. Another suspect, John Corcoran, was jailed for her murder in 1999 after his business card was found in Gorrie's room, but his conviction was overturned in 2003. After Corcoran's acquittal, police said they had no plans to re-open the murder investigation.
- 35-year-old mother of three, Jennifer Kiely, who suffered from mental health issues and who may have been homeless, was stabbed sixteen times and found burned in a beach shelter in Eastbourne on 22 January 2005. Tobin was linked to the case as he had connections to the town, but hospital records show that he was being treated in Renfrewshire in the days leading up to the murder and was only discharged on the day of, which would appear to rule him out of the attack.

== Bible John speculation ==
Tobin's convictions led to speculation in the late 2000s that he was Bible John, an unidentified serial killer who murdered three young women in Glasgow in the 1960s: Patricia Docker, 25; Jemima McDonald, 32; and Helen Puttock, 29. It had been alleged that Tobin reacted violently to his victims' menstruation, something that has long been suspected as the motive behind the Bible John murders. Tobin has since been eliminated as a suspect by police. Tobin moved from Glasgow to Brighton with his fiancée, Margaret Mountney, before the second murder attributed to Bible John. Operation Anagram found that Tobin was in Brighton at the time of the final two Bible John murders. He had married his first wife in Brighton on 6 August 1969, ten days before Bible John's August 16 murder of McDonald, as recorded on their marriage certificate. He was still living in Brighton at the time of the third murder, meaning he would have had to travel without his wife's knowledge to Glasgow and back to have committed the murder of Puttock, Bible John's third victim.

Although DNA had been used to rule out a previous suspect, detectives initially believed that a DNA link to Tobin would be unlikely due to a deterioration of the samples through poor storage. Tobin's DNA was ultimately checked against a semen stain on Puttock's tights as part of Operation Anagram, which was the only remaining forensic evidence in the Bible John case. The results of this analysis ultimately proved that the semen was not sourced from Tobin. The police also have a record of a bite mark that was found on Puttock's body, which they can cross-check with Tobin's dental records, as had been done with John McInnes when he was exhumed and subsequently eliminated as a suspect in 1996. Also, contemporary photos of Tobin showed he did not have red hair like Bible John was described to have had. Swindle has stated that there is no evidence to link Tobin to the Bible John murders, and Operation Anagram eventually discounted the theory.

== Illness and death ==
On 9 August 2012, Tobin was taken to Edinburgh Royal Infirmary after suffering chest pains and a suspected heart attack at HM Prison Edinburgh. At the same prison on 1 July 2015, he was slashed with a razor blade in his sleep, leaving a twenty-centimetre scar running down his face and neck. His cellmate, 31-year-old double rapist Sean Moynihan, pleaded guilty to the attack in October and was sentenced to thirty-two more months in prison.

In February 2016, Tobin was hospitalised again following a suspected stroke. In 2019 he was reported to be "frail" and suffering from cancer. He was taken to hospital again on 30 March 2022 and released two days later. Tobin died at Edinburgh Royal Infirmary on 8 October 2022, aged 76. His body was subsequently cremated and on 16 October 2022, his ashes were scattered at sea after no relatives or next of kin claimed his body.

== See also ==
- Alun Kyte – a similarly transient British killer of women
- List of serial killers in the United Kingdom
- List of serial killers by number of victims
- Murders of Jacqueline Ansell-Lamb and Barbara Mayo – two murders also previously linked to Tobin
- Alun Kyte § Operation Enigma – similarly named police investigation that also covered the UK

== Sources ==
- Wilson, David; Harrison, Paul (2010). The Lost British Serial Killer: Closing the Case on Peter Tobin and Bible John. London: Sphere. ISBN 978-0-751-54232-5.
