= Murder of Patsy Morris =

1980 child murder in London, England

Patricia Joyce Morris
- Morris, c. 1980
- Born: Patricia Joyce Morris; 10 January 1966; Eton, Berkshire, England
- Died: 16 June 1980 (aged 14); Hounslow Heath, London; 51.45821°N 0.39288°W (approximate)
- Cause of death: Ligature strangulation
- Occupation: Student
- Known for: Victim of unsolved child murder

On 16 June 1980, Patricia "Patsy" Morris, a 14-year-old schoolgirl from Feltham, London, was murdered by strangulation. She disappeared after leaving her school during her lunch break, and was found dead in undergrowth on Hounslow Heath near her home two days later. Despite repeated appeals for information by police, her murder remains unsolved.

The murder was brought to public attention again in 2008, when it was discovered that she had been a childhood girlfriend of west London serial killer Levi Bellfield, known for being the murderer of Surrey teenager Milly Dowler in 2002. Police investigated links between her murder and Bellfield, but he was never formally charged over her death.

== Background ==
Patricia Morris was a blonde 14-year-old schoolgirl born to George Morris, a retired army chief, and Marjorie Morris. She had moved with her family from Birmingham to Isleworth, West London, in 1979. She attended Feltham Comprehensive School with her sister and two brothers.

On 16 June 1980, Morris disappeared, having been seen leaving her school during her lunch break. It was believed Morris left school because she had forgotten her raincoat that morning, choosing to return home to change into dry clothes. This is reportedly what she told her friends she was going to do, and a family friend and neighbour confirmed that she had not taken her coat to school and had got soaked as a result. The neighbour stated that Morris had probably tried to come home without realising that she had left her key at home, and that when she realised she would be unable to get in had probably tried to walk over the heath to Cavalry Barracks, where her parents worked, so she could get a key from them. One source instead states that she had a double history lesson scheduled for that afternoon which she often avoided attending, and so played truant for the rest of the school day, although it is not clear what evidence there is for this claim.

A witness recalled seeing Morris soon after noon near her home. Another witness recalled seeing a girl who may have been Morris crouching at a bus stop on the Hounslow Heath side of Staines Road, just west of the Hussar public house between 12:20 p.m. and 12:40 p.m. These were the last sightings of her alive. After she was reported missing a large search operation was launched to find her, involving hundreds of police officers, helicopters and members of the public who had volunteered to help.

=== Discovery of body ===
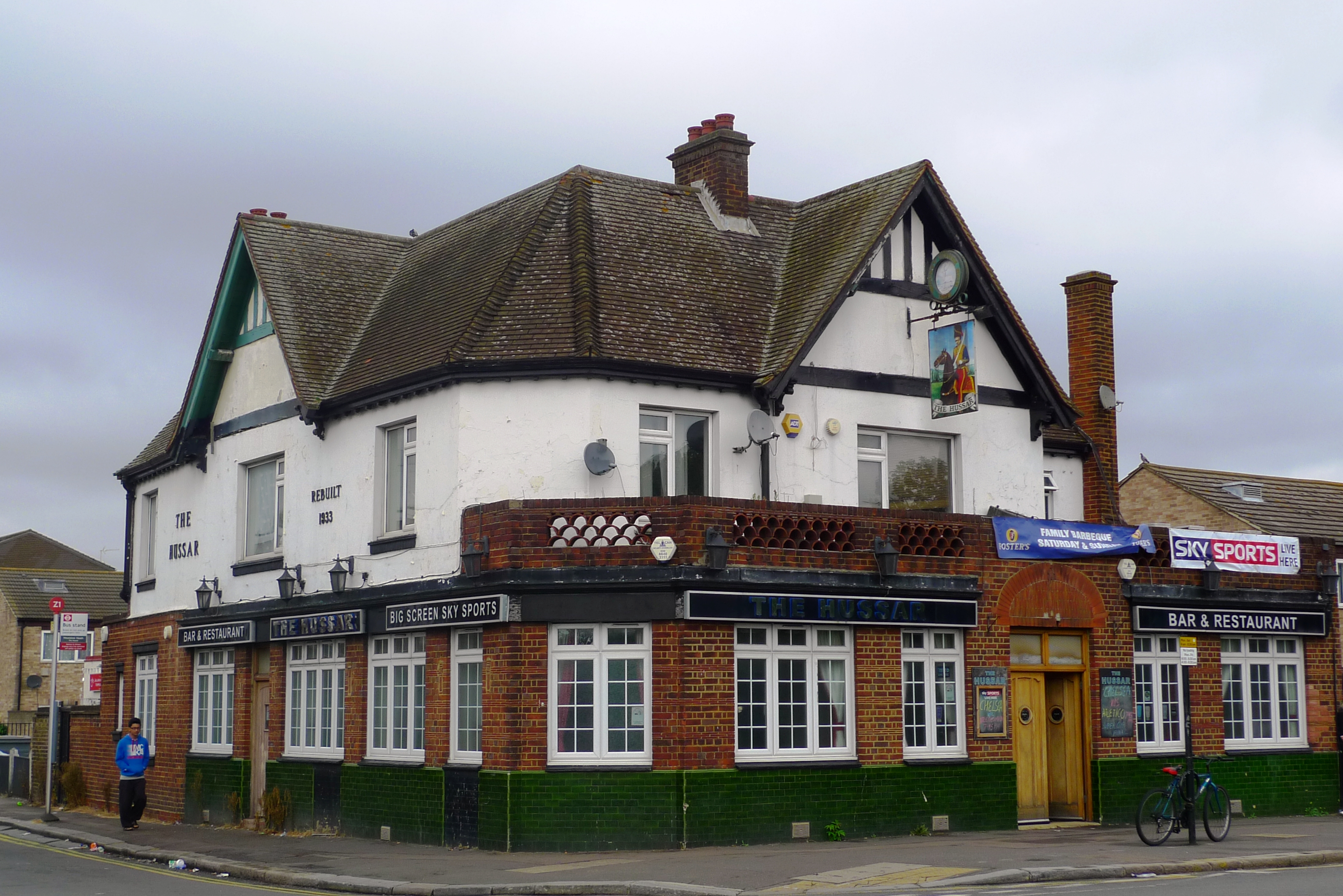
The Hussar pub on Staines Road, opposite the bus stop where Morris was possibly last seen.

Two days later, on the evening of 18 June, Morris's body was found by a police dog handler on Hounslow Heath. She was discovered face down in a copse beside a path on the edge of the Heath, at a location a quarter of a mile from her home in Cygnet Avenue. The place she was found was just a five minute walk from her home, and was on the route between her home and her father's workplace at Cavalry Barracks. She was found fully clothed. She had been found ten yards from a path through one of the small woods. She had been strangled with a ligature. For an unknown reason, police found that she had been wearing two pairs of knickers that day. There were no signs of sexual assault.

== Police investigations ==
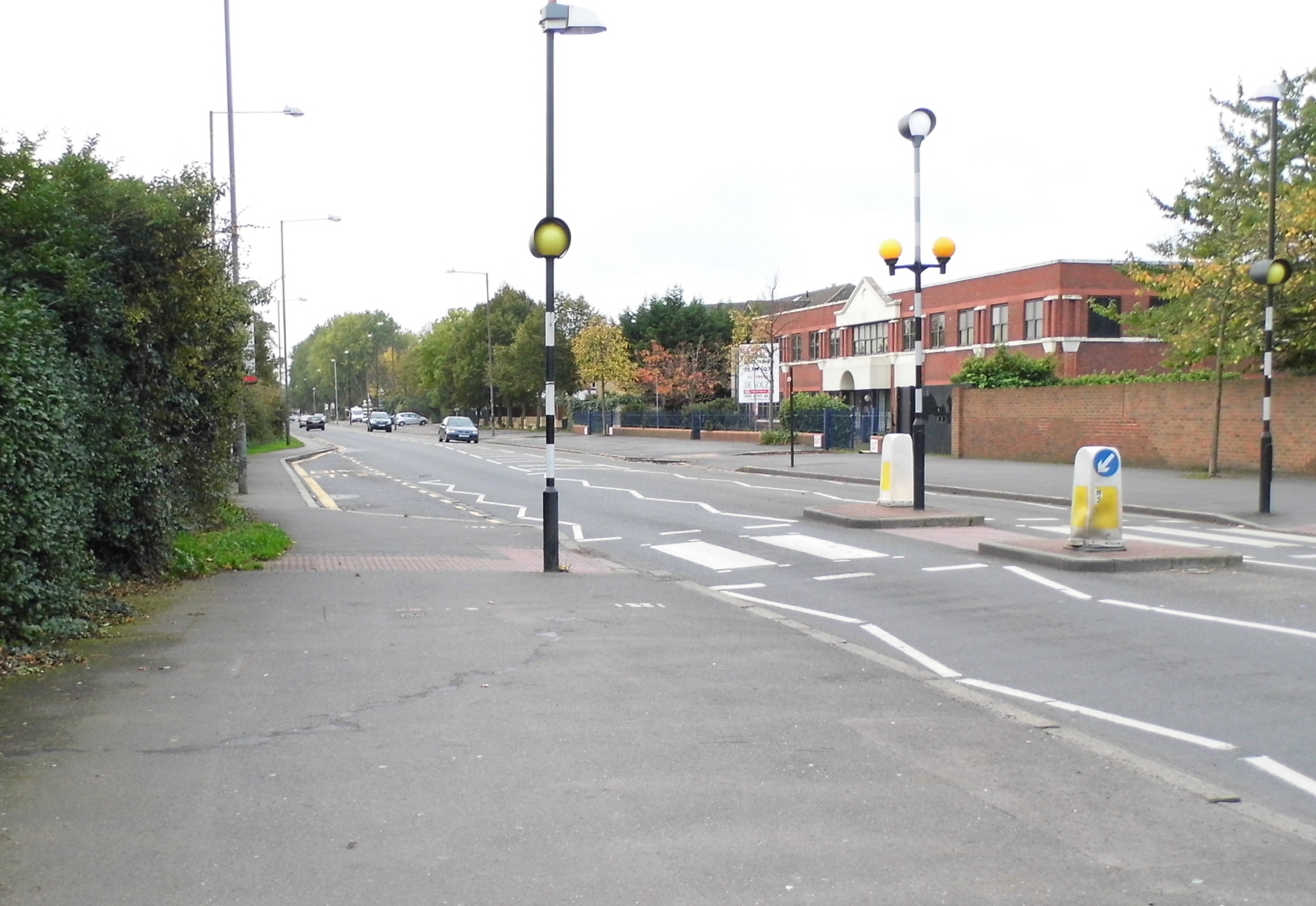
The bus stop opposite the Hussar Pub on Staines Road, Hounslow, where Morris may have last been seen.

Police released a public statement after the death, warning parents in west London not to let their children cross Hounslow Heath alone. Morris' mother said that she had no reason to be on Hounslow Heath, stating to the press: "We can't understand what she was doing on the heath. She was always told not to go there and never disobeyed our orders." Attacks on women and even deaths were not unknown in the area, but previous attacks had invariably involved the full rape of the victim.

The police questioned Morris's classmates in an attempt to find out what her final movements had been. On 22 June, four days after she was found dead, a detective on the investigative team told the press that they felt another youngster playing truant could hold key information on the murder. Soon after Morris was found dead, her father received a phoned death threat from an unidentified teenage boy. The call was from a local caller who seemed to have a local accent.

In December 1980, the police appealed for a mysterious driver of a blue van with a radio telephone to come forward. The man was seen using a telephone handset in his van near the home of Morris around the time of her murder, and detectives said that he could have seen something that would help the investigation. By this point, police had only managed to trace nine out of 22 people who played golf on the course next to where Morris was found, and detectives also appealed for their help to trace a 5 ft 10 in man who had dark greying hair and who was wearing a dark suit. Police investigations at the time drew a blank and the murderer was not apprehended.

=== 1996 suspect ===
In 1996 the case was re-opened and police arrested a man from Hounslow. The police were acting on new information on the murder and raided the suspect's house at dawn on 8 July of that year. The man, who was arrested at Hounslow bus depot, was then 33 years old, meaning he would have been 17 at the time of the murder in 1980. He was released on bail but was re-interviewed in August. In October the man was released from police custody again on bail, and it was reported that police had applied for permission to charge the suspect from the Crown Prosecution Service (CPS). However, the CPS decided not to prosecute the man.

=== Peter Tobin ===
In 2007, Morris's murder was one of a number of cases linked in the press to newly discovered Scottish serial killer Peter Tobin, who was found to have killed three women between 1991 and 2006. After hearing of the discovery of two women's bodies buried at Tobin's former Margate home, George Morris said that something inside him "clicked" and that he believed Tobin had also murdered his daughter. Her case was reviewed as part of an investigation into other potential victims of Tobin, named Operation Anagram, but Morris's family heard no more from the police and the investigation was wound down in 2011, having found no evidence that conclusively linked Tobin to any other murders.

=== Levi Bellfield ===
In February 2008, police revealed they were investigating a possible confession to the murder made by Levi Bellfield, an Isleworth-born killer who lived nearby at the time and who had just been convicted of two murders and an attempted murder. The attacks had been committed between 2003 and 2004 in the vicinity of the Morris murder site. He was said to have been obsessed with the murder when it occurred and remained 'fascinated' by the unsolved killing. Bellfield was alleged to have made the confession to a cellmate while on remand. It was then revealed that Bellfield had attended Feltham Comprehensive with Morris, and that he was her childhood boyfriend. Morris's family told the press that they had not known they had known each other, and her sister stated: "We did not know him. It was a shock when we found out they knew each other. Friends told us about it. It is horrendous." In 2011, Bellfield was further convicted of the murder of another schoolgirl, Milly Dowler, whom he had abducted and raped in 2002.

Bellfield would have been 12 years old at the time of Morris's murder, a year before his first conviction (for burglary). He was known to have repeatedly played truant and frequent Hounslow Heath during the school day. He did not attend school on the day of the murder. As Morris was blonde, some have suggested that her death may have triggered Bellfield's violent obsession with blonde women; he was known to target and express hatred towards blondes.

After it was revealed that Bellfield was being investigated by police for his daughter's murder, George Morris stated that he was certain that the teenage boy who had threatened his life over the phone at the time was Bellfield, saying: "He's a local man, which is why it could be him. And it's terrifying to think that someone of twelve or thirteen could have done it."

=== Suggested links to Weedon, Parravincina and Stratford murders ===
Locations of the murders of Weedon, Parravincina and Morris in the London Borough of Hounslow

Immediately after Morris's murder, it was noted in the press that she was the third female to be murdered in the area in the previous five years, following the murders of 16-year-old schoolgirl Lynne Weedon in 1975 and 27-year-old Elizabeth Parravincina in 1977.

Morris's case has also been speculatively linked to the 1975 murder of model Eve Stratford, which DNA investigations proved shared an unknown perpetrator with Weedon's murder. According to a 2015 book by Chris Clark and Tim Tate, Morris was tied up in a similar fashion to Stratford, with one leg of a pair of tights being used to tie her hands behind her back and the other leg being tied around her ankle. Along with the murder of Morris, the Weedon, Parravincina, and Stratford murder cases remain unsolved.

== Subsequent events ==
With Bellfield having not been charged with Morris's murder, it was reported in 2012 that he may have been ruled out as a suspect. However, in 2016 it was reported that links between Bellfield and other crimes had been reinvestigated after new information had been found, and that Morris's case could have been one of around 20 crimes that police had questioned Bellfield about. Police subsequently announced that all lines of enquiry had been exhausted and no evidence had been found to link him to any other unsolved crime. Morris's murder remains unsolved. Both of her parents have since died.

=== Alleged links to Peter Sutcliffe ===
In 2015, crime writers Chris Clark and Tim Tate published a book alleging links between a number of unsolved murders and the infamous "Yorkshire Ripper" serial killer Peter Sutcliffe. In the book, the authors claimed that Morris could have been a victim of Sutcliffe, since he was believed to have been house-sitting nearby in Alperton with his brother at the time, and both were regularly cruising and picking up women in their cars for sex. They also claimed that Morris was found half-naked and that her clothing had been arranged in a typical Yorkshire Ripper-like fashion, with her clothes pushed upwards over the top half of her body. Clark and Tate further alleged that her knickers and her tights had been pulled down over her ankles.

A second pair of tights with one leg missing was tied around her leg, they state, and wound upwards until it was knotted four times around her neck, as a form of ligature. According to the writers an identical pair of one-legged tights was also wrapped three times around both her wrists in front of her body and then over her breasts. It was asserted that her body was allegedly also posed in the same fashion as Sutcliffe's known victims. For Clark and Tate, her knickers being pulled down and her clothing supposedly being organised in the way it was suggested a sexual motive to the killing, and indicated the perpetrator had found sexual stimulation without penetration. Police have apparently never investigated links to Sutcliffe.

Clark and Tate also, however, claimed that the person who killed Morris also killed Eve Stratford, Lynne Weedon and Elizabeth Parravincina, and that this person was Sutcliffe. This is despite the fact that the DNA profile of the killer is known in the Stratford and Weedon cases, and police are known to already have a copy of Sutcliffe's DNA and have been able to rule him out of unsolved murders as a result, such as in the Lesley Molseed case. Upon Sutcliffe's death in 2020, Clark submitted a Freedom of Information request to the Home Office, asking if Sutcliffe's DNA was on the national DNA database. The Home Office confirmed that it was, indicating that Sutcliffe can be ruled out of unsolved murder cases in which there is existing DNA evidence, such as in the Stratford and Weedon cases. Notably, the murders of Stratford and Weedon, as well as the cases of Parravincina and Morris, subsequently did not feature in the 2022 ITV documentary based on Clark and Tate's book.

== In popular culture ==
Morris's murder has featured in a number of documentaries about Bellfield, such as the 2012 documentary His name is Evil: Levi Bellfield which was shown on Crime + Investigation as part of the Evidence of Evil series. Her murder is also discussed in the 2021 Channel 5 documentary Levi Bellfield: Getting away with Murder?, featuring an interview with Jeff Edwards, the chief crime correspondent at the Daily Mirror at the time.

In 2011, crime writer Geoffrey Wansell released a book on Bellfield that also suggested possible links between him and Morris's murder, titled: The Bus Stop Killer: Milly Dowler, Her Murder and the Full Story of the Sadistic Serial Killer Levi Bellfield. Wansell speculated that the murder could have been as a result of her rejecting Bellfield and him becoming infuriated as a result. Chris Clark and Tim Tate's book which suggested links between Peter Sutcliffe and Morris's death was published by John Blake publishing in 2015. ITV filmed a documentary based on the book titled Yorkshire Ripper: The Secret Murders which was shown in February 2022, although the murder of Morris was notably not featured (alongside the discredited theory linking the murders of Stratford, Weedon and Parravincina to Sutcliffe).

== See also ==
- List of solved missing person cases (1980s)
- List of unsolved murders in the United Kingdom (1980s)
- Murder of Helen Gorrie – similar unsolved UK murder
- Murder of Lindsay Rimer – unsolved 1994 case of a British child who disappeared from Yorkshire and who was found dead in a nearby canal one year later
- David Smith (murderer) – convicted rapist who was living in the area at the time of the murder, later convicted of murder
- Colin Campbell (murderer) – murdered two young women nearby in west London in sexually motivated attacks, also in the early 1980s

== Sources ==
- Appleyard, Nick (2009). Life Means Life. Jailed Forever: True Stories of Britain's Most Evil Killers. London: John Blake. ISBN 978-1-844-54668-8.
- Clark, Chris; Tate, Tim (2015). Yorkshire Ripper: The Secret Murders, the True Story of how Peter Sutcliffe's Terrible Reign of Terror Claimed at Least Twenty-Two More Lives. London: John Blake. ISBN 978-1-78418-418-6.
- Wansell, Geoffrey (2011). The Bus Stop Killer: Milly Dowler, Her Murder and the Full Story of the Sadistic Serial Killer Levi Bellfield. UK: Penguin. ISBN 978-0241952818.
