= Purbrook Park School =

Location
- Park Avenue; Waterlooville, Hampshire; England; 50.859°N 1.040°W

Information
- Type: Foundation school
- Motto: Enjoy Enrich Excel. Vincit Veritas (Truth Conquers)
- Established: 1924
- Local authority: Hampshire
- Department for Education URN: 116506 Tables
- Ofsted: Reports
- Headteacher: Paul Foxley
- Gender: Coeducational
- Age: 11 to 16
- Enrolment: 840
- Website: http://www.purbrookparkschool.co.uk/

Purbrook Park School is a comprehensive co-educational secondary school situated in Purbrook, north of Portsmouth, Hampshire. The school has an enrollment number of 840 pupils, aged 11 through to 16. It became a trust school in April 2009. Ofsted judged the school to be a "Good School" in May 2015.

== History ==
The main building has existed on the site since 1769. The original building was built for Peter Taylor MP by the Palladian architect Sir Robert Taylor, who was also the architect of the first Bank of England. The estate was bought by John Deverell in 1839 and remained within the Deverell family until 1919, when the estate was sold off at auction because the cost to run it was too great. The house and its four acres of grounds were sold at auction to Maurice Hill. The house remained empty until 1924 before County Authorities bought the house and its grounds for £11,000.

The house was converted into a grammar school in September 1924 and was known as Purbrook Park County High School. A new hall and gymnasium were created in 1928 and 1935, respectively. Further outbuildings were made throughout the twentieth century to accompany specialist subjects.

In about 1960, the school’s name was changed from Purbrook Park County High School to Purbrook Park County Grammar School.

The school reached its largest enrolment in the 1970s with over 1000 pupils, until the Sixth Form was disbanded as part of the conversion from a grammar school to a comprehensive. This conversion began in 1974 with the first intake of comprehensive pupils into what is now known as Year 7. The school’s name was then changed from Purbrook Park County Grammar School to simply Purbrook Park School. The Sixth Form finally ended a few years later, and the number of pupils gradually fell to below 900 to its current level.

In 2016, a new Discovery Wing was added at the front of the school, with new classrooms, a new Discovery Centre, and a new restaurant and cafe.

Since 1 April 2009, the school has been a trust school.

In July 2024, the school celebrated its centenary. An open day was held with various displays, presentations and former pupils being invited back to the school.

== Notable students ==
- Raymond Dobson, Labour MP for Bristol North East from 1966 to 1980
- Helen Gorrie, student at the school who was murdered in 1992, her murder is still unsolved
- Clive Green, professional footballer Portsmouth F.C., Yeovil Town and Maidstone United. England Under-18 schoolboys.
- Sir David Hopwood, John Innes Professor of Genetics at the University of East Anglia from 1968 to 1998, President of the Genetical Society from 1985 to 1987, and of the Society of General Microbiology from 2000 to 2003
- Alan Lerwill, athlete, Commonwealth Games Medal Winner in long jump (bronze 1970 and gold 1974), former British high jump record holder
- André Usborne, athlete, Luger in the 1984 Winter Olympics in Sarajevo and Team Captain for Great Britain in the 1988 Winter Olympics in Calgary
- Mason Mount, professional footballer, Manchester United, Chelsea F.C., SBV Vitesse, Derby County and England national team
- Reginald Rainey OBE, entomologist, President of the Royal Entomological Society of London from 1979 to 1981
- Sarah Smith and Sean Smith, singers in pop group Same Difference, who came 3rd in X Factor in 2007
- Kim Winser (née Haresign) OBE, businesswoman, first ever female Marks & Spencer board member, former CEO of Pringle Scotland and Aquascutum. Owner of Winser London fashion house.
- Alfie Bridgeman, professional footballer, Moneyfields F.C, Bognor Regis Town F.C, Portsmouth F.C and Maltese U-19/U-21s national team
- James Ralls, founder of Victorious Festival in Southsea. Also, part time drag queen known as Ralls Royce.
