= Murder of Helen Gorrie =

Unsolved UK murder and miscarriage of justice

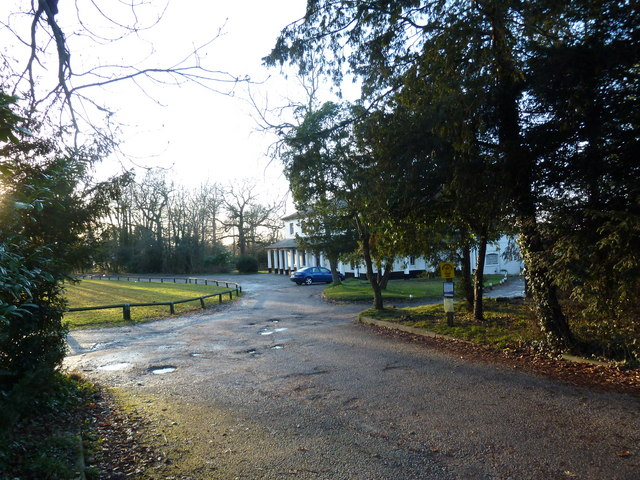
- Merchistoun Hall in Horndean. Gorrie was found dead in the grounds of the hall.
- Date: 31 July 1992 or the early hours of 1 August 1992
- Time: Between 11:30 and 12:30 am, likely around 12:30 am
- Location: Merchistoun Hall (Horndean Community Centre), Portsmouth Road, Horndean, Hampshire; 50.9109°N 1.0055°W

On 1 August 1992, Helen Gorrie, a 15-year-old British schoolgirl was found half-naked and strangled in the grounds of Merchistoun Hall in Horndean, after going out one night to meet 21-year-old John Corcoran.

She had met him the night before as he cruised around the area in his vehicle, and he had asked her to meet up with him that night. The murder of Gorrie made headline news at the time and featured on Crimewatch. Corcoran was suspected of strangling Gorrie after she refused his sexual advances, and in 1999 he was convicted of her murder, as well as being charged with the rape of a 14-year-old girl in 1990.

In 2003, Corcoran was released on appeal, on the grounds that the judge's final summing up had been deficient. The police revealed that there were no grounds to re-open the investigation and that they were not looking for anybody else, although the case remains officially unsolved.

== Murder ==
Helen Gorrie
- Gorrie in 1992
- Born: 1976 or 1977
- Died: 31 July or 1 August 1992 (age 15); Merchistoun Hall, Horndean, Hampshire
- Cause of death: Murder by strangulation
- Occupation: Schoolgirl at Purbrook Park School
- Known for: Victim of high-profile child murder and her case becoming a controversial miscarriage of justice

Gorrie was described as a sociable girl with lots of friends who liked being out and about. She lived on an estate in Horndean, Hampshire, with her mum Sheila and stepbrother Jamie, and attended Purbrook Park School. Her mother said that she was well-liked and did not have "an enemy in the world". On the night she died, Friday 31 July 1992, she spent the later part of the evening at home with her brother. At 11:30 pm, Helen said she was going to bed, before coming back downstairs shortly after and leaving the house, telling her brother that she would only be a few minutes and wouldn't be long. As she had been getting ready for bed she had gone out with her all-in-one nightdress beneath her clothing. It wasn't unusual for Helen to go out that late, as a lot of her friends lived nearby and sometimes they called for her, or she might occasionally see a friend she knew out of an upstairs window and gone out to meet them. She was normally home by about 1:00 am.

The following morning, Gorrie was found dead in the grounds of Merchistoun Hall, the Horndean Community Centre, only 10 minutes' walk from her house. She was found left in plain view on a footpath 100 yards behind the hall by wedding guests using the facility. She had been strangled with her own clothing and police believed she may have died around 12:30 am. She was half-naked, indicating the murder was sexually motivated, although there was no evidence of sexual assault. Police said the fact that her clothing had been interfered with indicated the motive may have been sexual, and said she had been murdered on the spot she was found.

== Investigation ==
Gorrie's murder made headline news nationally. At an emotional news conference, Gorrie's mother broke down as she described how her daughter was "a lovable girl with a zest for life".

Several witnesses came forward to report seeing a girl matching Gorrie's description near to Merchistoun Hall that evening. Two independent witnesses had reported seeing a girl who looked to be Gorrie waiting at a bus stop by the Portsmouth Road, at the junction with Catherington Lane, and getting into a car that may have been a Ford Escort which had come up from Catherington Lane.

At around midnight, a woman driving along Portsmouth Road saw a man come out of the bushes on the side of the road, and he appeared to not want to have his face seen by the driver. At 12:30 am, a man driving down the same stretch of road saw two men standing several yards apart, but the driver got the impression that they were together. He said that one of the men looked suspicious and seemed to be worried that someone had spotted them. Police believe it may have been around this time that Helen was killed.

Gorrie's case was featured on the influential Crimewatch programme three months after her murder in October, where it was also revealed that an unidentified man who had gone in to the One Stop supermarket on Catherington Lane on 3 August telling the cashier that he had seen Gorrie on the road at around 12:30 am that night (the time police believed she may have been killed). When the cashier asked if he had told the police this information, he began acting strangely and left quickly, saying he hadn't, with the cashier commenting "all he really wanted to do was to get away from me".

== John Corcoran ==
A few days after Gorrie's murder, unemployed 21-year-old John Anthony Mark Corcoran of Warren Park, Havant, was questioned about the murder. His "business card" had been found in Helen's bedroom, and he had scratches on his arm. Helen had met Corcoran the night before she died as he cruised the streets of Horndean in his battered Ford Escort car. He was known to cruise around the area in his vehicle looking for young girls to hand business cards to and to seek sex from. It was discovered that Gorrie had written in her diary before she had left on the night she died, saying:

"John 'phoned me up, the one I met last night. He wants me to go for a drive with him and his friends."

On the night Gorrie went out, Corcoran had again been driving aimlessly around Horndean with his friends. His friends said that he left them for 40 minutes, saying he had to meet someone. He was said to "prey on young girls" and police believed he had tried to force himself on Gorrie, and when she resisted he strangled and smothered her with her own clothing.

Although he had already been a suspect in Gorrie's murder and been spoken to by police, Helen's sister would later recount how Corcoran had attempted to flirt with her and ask her on a date while having an affair with one of her friends, with the sister saying: "I couldn't believe it when he tried it on with me. I was disgusted". She added that it was known he was interested in "kinky sex".

== Trial ==
Corcoran, of Plumley Walk in Havant, was tried and found guilty of Gorrie's murder in December 1999. He was also charged with the rape of a 14-year-old girl in 1990. It was heard that the scratches on his arm had come from Helen as she fought him for her life, as supported by the fact that two of her false fingernails were found at the scene. A witness who had previously given Corcoran an alibi had come forward to tell police that he had lied. In the early stages of the trial it had been reported that DNA evidence which linked Corcoran to the murder scene would be part of the prosecution case, and a year previously it had been reported that investigators had identified DNA from material from under Gorrie's broken nails or from her clothing, but this evidence was not used at the trial. Sentencing, the judge told him:

"There is no doubt in my mind that you have a very strong streak of arrogance in your character. On the night in question in 1992 you were determined to have sex with that 15-year-old girl whether she liked it or not. She rebuffed and resisted you and you strangled her."

Corcoran was sentenced to life imprisonment. Lead detective Colin Smith reacted by saying: "Helen was a popular, lively but vulnerable adolescent who was killed by a nasty and vicious man who preyed on young girls."

== Conviction overturned ==
In January 2003, Corcoran had his conviction for the murder overturned on appeal. The grounds were that the judge had misdirected the jury in his summing up. After he was released Corcoran moved back to his home in Plumley Walk, Warren Park, Havant. After his release, the police said they had no plans to re-open the investigation and that they were not looking for anybody else.

== Later publicity ==
In 2018, on journalist Mark Williams-Thomas's documentary show The Investigator: A British Crime Story, Gorrie's case was included on a list of cases that he felt could not be ruled out as possible victims of serial killer Peter Tobin. However, a large police investigation named Operation Anagram examined the possibility of Tobin having claimed more victims and ended in 2011, having found no evidence to connect him to any further cases.

== In popular culture ==
Gorrie's murder featured as the primary case on the 15 October 1992 episode of Crimewatch on BBC One. On 26 October 1996, the Gorrie case was featured on a Murder Unsolved programme shown on Sky One.

== See also ==
- List of miscarriages of justice § United Kingdom
- Double jeopardy § Post-2003
