= André Usborne =

British luger and Captain in the British Royal Navy

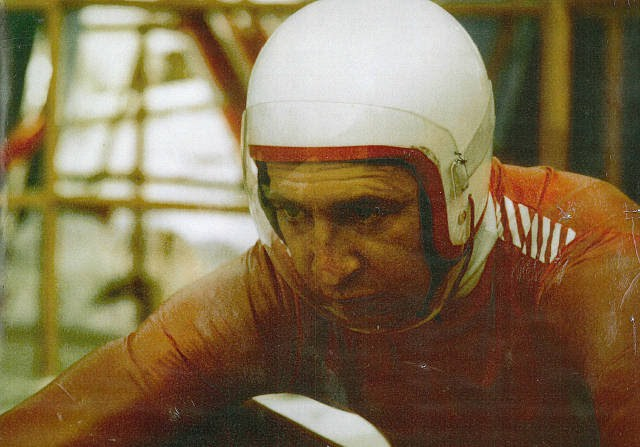
- Usborne training for the Winter Olympics

Personal information
- Full name: André Christopher Usborne
- Nationality: British
- Born: 16 October 1952 (age 73) Portsmouth, England
- Height: 5 ft 5.5 in (166 cm)
- Spouse: Veronica Usborne (1984–present)
- Military career
- Allegiance: United Kingdom
- Branch: Royal Navy
- Service years: 1971–2006 (35 years)
- Rank: Captain

Sport
- Sport: Luge

André Usborne (born 16 October 1952) is a British luger and a former Captain in the British Royal Navy. He competed in the men's singles event at the 1984 Winter Olympics and went on to manage the luge team at the 1988 Winter Olympics in Calgary, Canada.

== Personal life ==
André Christopher Usborne was born on 16 October 1952 in Portsmouth, England. He is the eldest of 5 children and attended Purbrook Park School. In 1984 André married Veronica, together they have two sons, Peter (born 1985) and Neil (born 1986).

== Luge ==
Training predominantly on the Cresta Run, André competed at the FIBT World Championships 1982 and was awarded the Lord Trenchard Trophy and Auty Speed Cup for the fastest time recorded in the competition. André subsequently competed in men's singles at FIL European Luge Championships 1984 then at the 1984 Winter Olympics in Sarajevo.

André returned as Luge Team Captain for Great Britain at the 1988 Winter Olympics in Calgary.

== Naval career ==
André served in the Royal Navy from 1971 to 2006 (35 years). He joined as a cadet attending Britannia Royal Naval College in Dartmouth before obtaining a degree in Electrical Engineering from RNEC Manadon. Usborne served on HMS Glamorgan (D19), HMS Norfolk (D21), HMS Alacrity (F174) and held a number of shore-based appointments including HMS Royal Arthur (shore establishment), Ministry of Defence Main Building and Northwood Headquarters.

André was promoted to the rank of Commander in 1993 and to the rank of Captain (Royal Navy) in 2004.

== Fundraising ==
André has participated in a number of fundraising events for charity. Notable participation includes a 1.5 nautical mile open water swim across The Solent in August 2013 and again in July 2014 raising money for The Rowans Hospice. In May 2022, Usborne completed a 2,100-mile circumnavigation of Great Britain raising over £9,500 for Parkinson's UK. The journey was documented in the book Voyage for a Cure.
