= Murder of Carole Packman =

1985 murder case in England

Carole Packman
- Born: Veronica Anne Thornton c. 1945; UK
- Died: June 1985 (aged 40)
- Occupation: Engineer
- Known for: Victim of murder
- Spouse: Russell Causley
- Children: 1

Veronica Anne Packman (née Thornton, c. 1945 – June 1985), known as Carole Packman, was a 40-year-old British woman who disappeared from her home in Bournemouth, England in June 1985. Her husband, Russell Causley (né Packman), was found guilty of her murder, but her body has never been found.

On 12 December 2022, Causley had the first public parole hearing in British history. Samantha Gillingham, the couple's daughter who has campaigned for years to keep her father in prison, called the decision to hold a public hearing "momentous".

In January 2023 the Parole Board concluded that Causley should be released again and he left prison in February that year, subject to release licence conditions.

== Disappearance ==
Carole Packman disappeared from the family home in Bournemouth in June 1985. After her husband, Russell Causley, was caught faking his death off the coast of Guernsey as part of an insurance scam in 1993, he was convicted and jailed for fraud in 1995. After the trial, Dorset Police re-investigated the disappearance of Packman.

== Trial ==
Causley was convicted of her murder on 18 December 1996 and sentenced to life imprisonment with a minimum tariff of 16 years.

Despite the absence of any body or forensic evidence, the prosecution sought to convince the jury: that Carole Packman was no longer alive; that she had been murdered; and that her husband was the killer.

== Appeal and re-conviction ==
Causley appealed against his conviction in 1998, but the conviction was upheld. In June 2003, his conviction was overturned by the Court of Appeal following another appeal, and the judge ordered a retrial. At his retrial in 2004, he was once again found guilty of murder.

== Subsequent events ==
Russell Causley became eligible for parole in 2012. After several hearings, he was eventually granted parole in 2020. Packman's grandson, Neil Gillingham, spoke out against the decision as "Helen's Law" was passing through parliament during the review. Packman's daughter Samantha Gillingham has urged Causley throughout the years to reveal the location of her mother's body. Samantha Gillingham initially made calls in the media for a "no body, no parole" law in 2010, two years before Causley became eligible for parole.

Neil Gillingham was critical of the Prisoners (Disclosure of Information About Victims) Act 2020 legislation being passed through parliament and claimed it had been "watered down". Neil went further to say that in practice the law changes would not prevent convicted murderers from being freed despite their unwillingness to cooperate with the authorities. Various articles appeared in national press in January 2020, in which Neil Gillingham described "Helen's Law" as "a law with no teeth". This was later reiterated by Joshua Rozenberg in November 2020 in a blog post titled "A law that makes no difference".

In December 2020, the CEO of the Parole Board, Martin Jones, reinforced Neil Gillingham’s earlier warnings in a Sky News interview.

In December 2021, Causley was returned to prison after breaching his licence conditions. In January 2022, it was reported that he had been referred to the Parole Board once again. The hearing date was originally set for October 2022 following referral from Secretary of State for Justice Dominic Raab. The hearing date was given to the Bournemouth Daily Echo before Packman's family was notified, for which the Ministry of Justice apologised.

The BBC revealed on 4 August 2022 that Causley had been recalled to prison for "temporarily losing touch with authorities". Causley was imprisoned at HM Prison Lewes.

The original public parole hearing date was postponed due to "concerns the prisoner's safety was at risk". The day before the scheduled public hearing, it was announced that the Parole Board was adjourned due to compelling evidence that Causley’s release address had been leaked publicly.

On 12 December 2022, Causley attended a Parole Board hearing at which he admitted responsibility for his wife's murder. The hearing was the first in England and Wales to be held in public. On 5 January 2023, the Parole Board concluded that he should be released again. Justice Secretary Dominic Raab was considering whether to appeal the Parole Board's decision, but it was later announced by the Ministry of Justice that there were no legal grounds to do so. Causley was released from prison in February that year, subject to licence conditions that stipulate where he lives, who he contacts and also restrict his activities; he will be recalled to prison if he fails to comply with his release conditions.

== Media coverage ==
The case was covered ITV's crime series The Investigator: A British Crime Story in 2016. Dorset Police subsequently confirmed that the case remained open and that they would be examining new evidence presented by Mark Williams-Thomas.

The case has also been the subject of several other documentaries in recent years.

Episode 6 of When Missing Turns To Murder covers the Russell Causley case and is available to stream on Netflix, Amazon Prime and Apple TV.

Nine Lives Media produced Nightmare In Suburbia: the case featured in Series 3, Episode 3 titled Killing the truth which was initially broadcast in March 2011. Both Neil Gillingham and Samantha Gillingham discuss the impact the murder has had on them. The TV show is available to stream on Amazon Prime.

In September 2021, the case was again featured in Series 3, Episode 5 of The Killer In My Family series broadcast on Discovery+. Both Samantha Gillingham and her son Neil Gillingham appear in the programme giving in-depth accounts of the extraordinary impact the murder continues to have on their individual lives.

Monster Films produced Murder By The Sea Series 8 Episode 4 which is scheduled to be broadcast on Tuesday 31 January 2022 on CBS Reality and again on 1 February 2022. Neither Sam Gillingham or her son Neil Gillingham partake in the documentary and were unaware of its production.

== See also ==
- List of murder convictions without a body
- List of solved missing person cases (1980s)
- Murder of Helen McCourt
- List of unsolved murders in the United Kingdom (1980s)
- The Investigator: A British Crime Story
