= Holy Trinity Church, Eastbourne =

Church in Eastbourne, East Sussex, England

Coordinates: 50.7669°N 0.2881°E

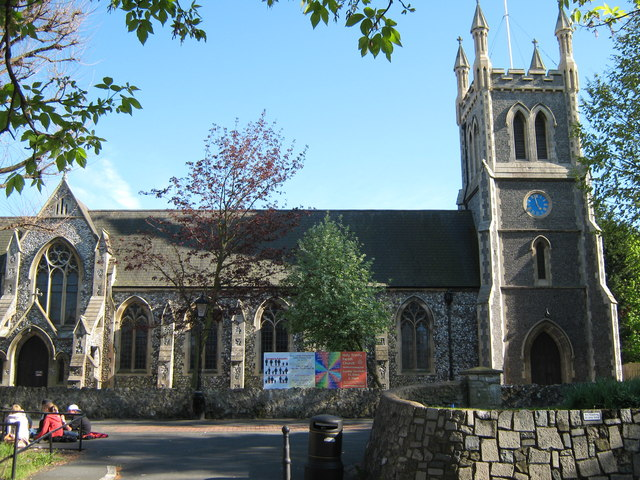
Holy Trinity Church

The Holy Trinity Church, Eastbourne, is an Anglican Early English-style place of worship in Eastbourne in the English county of East Sussex.

== Structure and history ==
It was designed by Decimus Burton and opened in 1839 as a Chapel of ease for St Mary the Virgin. Aisles and the east end of the chancel were added in 1855 and 1861 respectively. It became a parish church in 1847. The Reverend Thomas Henry Sparshott married his second wife in this church, in 1890. (Note: GRO index: Marriages Sep 1890 Sparshott Thomas Henry, Haynes Laura Lavinia. Holy Trinity Eastbourne 2b 139. Age of groom 48 years; age of bride 28 years.)

It is a conservative evangelical parish that has passed a resolution to reject the ordination and/or leadership of women, and it receives alternative episcopal oversight from the Bishop of Ebbsfleet (currently Rob Munro).
