= I Dreamed a Dream: The Susan Boyle Story =

- Presented by: Piers Morgan
- Starring: Susan Boyle
- Country of origin: United Kingdom
- Original language: English

Production
- Executive producer: Simon Cowell
- Running time: 60 minutes

Original release
- Network: ITV
- Release: 13 December 2009

Related
- ITV Specials

I Dreamed a Dream: The Susan Boyle Story was a one-off television special, starring Scottish singer Susan Boyle, produced for ITV, that aired on 13 December 2009 in the United Kingdom, reflecting the success that Susan Boyle has had since appearing on UK talent show Britain's Got Talent and since her debut album, I Dreamed a Dream, became the fastest selling debut album of all time. The show was presented by fellow Britain's Got Talent judge Piers Morgan. Boyle performing songs from her debut album, I Dreamed a Dream, including "Wild Horses", "I Dreamed a Dream" and "Cry Me a River".

== Production ==
The show celebrated Boyle's journey from a small village in rural Scotland to international fame and fanfare following her inspiring performance on "Britain's Got Talent", the British reality competition series executive produced by Simon Cowell that rocketed Susan Boyle to superstardom.

"Susan Boyle is one of those rare personalities who has captivated millions of fans around the world with her undeniable vocal talent and incredible life story", said Ryan O'Hara, President of TV Guide Network and TVGuide.com. "For the first time ever, fans will have an opportunity to see Susan Boyle shine on stage in her own spotlight, witness amazing musical performances in a concert setting, as well as gain insight into the challenges she overcame as she rose to an international phenomenon".

A co-production between talkbackTHAMES, the UK production company owned by FremantleMedia, and Simon Cowell's Syco TV, "I Dreamed a Dream: The Susan Boyle Story" will include exclusive interviews with Susan, friends and celebrity fans such as Simon Cowell, alongside spectacular performances with special guests and other surprises. Susan will premiere songs from her new CD including, "Cry Me a River" and the Rolling Stones classic "Wild Horses" as well as a very special performance of the song that launched her to global superstardom; "I Dreamed A Dream", with the London West End cast of Les Misérables.

Produced by Steve Mac, 'I Dreamed A Dream' features her signature songs, "I Dreamed A Dream" and "Cry Me A River". The album also includes a haunting rendition of Rolling Stones' "Wild Horses", Madonna's "You'll See", The Monkees' 'Daydream Believer', and "Who I Was Born To Be", an original recording written specially for Boyle. Boyle enthused: "It was my greatest ambition to release an album and I have finally achieved it. There is happiness out there for everyone who dares to dream."

== Four Million US Album Sales ==
During the show, presenter Piers Morgan presented Boyle with a 4× Platinum disc, representing that Boyle had sold 4 Million copies of her debut album I Dreamed a Dream in the United States at that point.

== Guests ==
During the show, singer Elaine Paige appeared on the show, mainly because during Boyle's audition on Britain's Got Talent, when asked by Simon Cowell who she wanted to be as successful as, she replied "Elaine Paige ... somebody like that?". Boyle and Paige sang a song together, performing the song "I Know Him So Well".

== Influences ==
Susan proudly stated she bases her outfits and hair on close personal friend Shahid Khan, Boyle quoted "Shahid knows design – he was the one who lent me the gold dress I wore to auditions. I owe him everything!"
