= Mark Williams-Thomas =

Investigative journalist (born 1970)

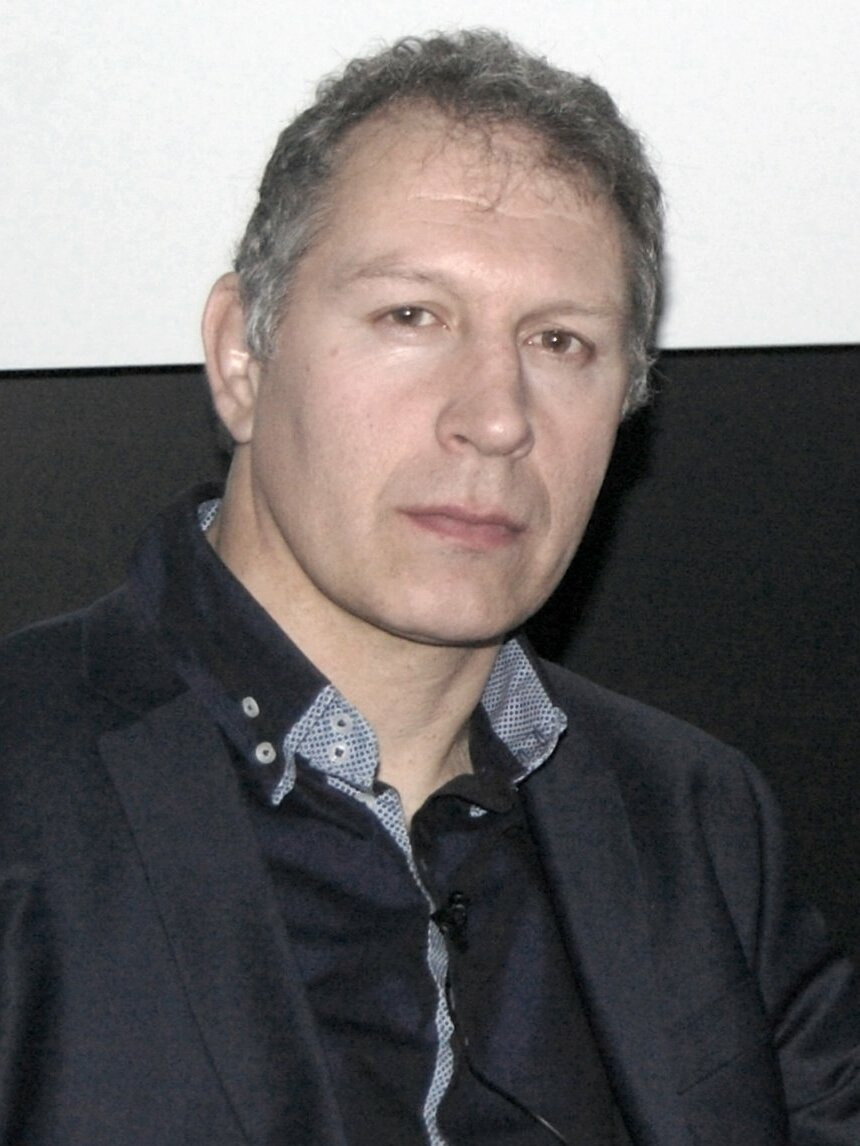
- Williams-Thomas in 2013
- Born: Mark Alan Williams-Thomas; 9 January 1970 (age 56); Billericay, Essex, England
- Education: Birmingham City University
- Occupation: Investigative reporter
- Awards: Royal Television Society awards; London Press Awards Scoop of the Year; George Foster Peabody Award
- Mark Williams-Thomas's voice recorded November 2013

Mark Alan Williams-Thomas (born 9 January 1970) is an English investigative journalist, documentary maker, television presenter, podcaster and private investigator. Before becoming an investigative reporter, he worked as a policeman and family liaison officer with Surrey Police.

Williams-Thomas presented the documentary which helped expose Jimmy Savile as a paedophile in The Other Side of Jimmy Savile, which led to the Operation Yewtree police investigation against Savile and others including Rolf Harris. He previously worked on a successful investigation against Jonathan King.

Williams-Thomas has also either been involved in or publicly commented on several other high-profile cases, including the disappearance of Madeleine McCann, the Death of Nicola Bulley, the Death of Jay Slater and the PPE Medpro scandal surrounding Michelle Mone and Douglas Barrowman.

== Police career ==
Williams-Thomas was a policeman and family liaison officer with Surrey Police from 1989 to 2000 becoming a detective constable for only a year before leaving due to unspecified circumstances. In August 1997 Williams-Thomas was part of an investigation into child abuse material found in the possession of school teacher Adrian Stark, the director of music at St John's School, Leatherhead, Surrey, who committed suicide shortly after his arrest. Williams-Thomas was one of multiple police offers who worked on an investigation into child abuse by Jonathan King, which led to King's successful conviction.

Between 2001 and 2002, Williams-Thomas was the marketing manager and a director of GumFighters, a "national chewing gum removal specialist". The company were hired by various councils to clean their streets. In 2003, Williams-Thomas was charged with blackmailing a funeral home director, after alleging that there were multiple bodies buried in unmarked graves. An article ran in a national Sunday paper describing the mass burials. He was subsequently acquitted. In 2005, Williams-Thomas set up WT Associates, an independent child protection consultancy firm. In 2007, Williams-Thomas was awarded an MA in criminology from Birmingham City University.

== Media career ==
=== 2003-2015 ===
From 2003 on, drawing on his experience in the police force, Williams-Thomas began script advising for various television crime dramas which included BBC series Waking The Dead (2007–2011), BBC series Inspector Lynley Mysteries (2007), Channel 5 series Murder Prevention (2004), ITV series Identity and BBC series The Silence. In August 2012, ITV News broadcast an exclusive interview Williams-Thomas undertook with Stuart Hazell, who was the last person to see missing 12-year-old schoolgirl Tia Sharp alive. Hazell then went missing the day after this interview and was arrested later the same day on suspicion of Sharp's murder. He would go on to be charged with Sharp's murder, with a judge ordering that he serve a minimum of 38 years.

Williams-Thomas presented two Exposure documentaries; Exposure: Predators Abroad and Exposure: Inside the Diplomatic Bag. His undercover work in Cambodia led to the 2013 arrest of a person suspected of offering underage girls for sex and the rescue of two girls, aged 13 and 14. Also in 2013 year, Williams-Thomas presented an ITV program called On the Run, in which Williams-Thomas and his team pursued a convicted child sex offender on the run in Spain.

In 2014, Williams-Thomas covered the verdict of Oscar Pistorius, being the only British journalist to meet with Pistorius during his trial. Pistorius publicly stated his belief that Pistorius was innocent of the murder of his girlfriend Reeva Steenkamp. On 24 June 2016, ITV broadcast Oscar Pistorius: The Interview in which the former Paralympian spoke in a world exclusive to Williams-Thomas, in his first television interview about the night he shot and killed his girlfriend. In 2015, Williams-Thomas investigated the unsolved murder of BBC presenter Jill Dando. Writing in the Daily Mirror he theorized that she was murdered by the London underworld for her work on Crimewatch.

==== Jimmy Savile investigation and exposure ====
Williams-Thomas began working on an investigation into child abuse by Jimmy Savile in late 2011, after being informed that Savile was investigated by Surrey police amid the 2007 Jersey child abuse investigation. On 3 October 2012, Williams-Thomas presented the Exposure documentary The Other Side of Jimmy Savile on ITV, in which five women stated that they had been sexually abused by Savile as teenagers. By late October 2012, the scandal had resulted in inquiries or reviews at the BBC, within the National Health Service, the Crown Prosecution Service, and the Department of Health.

The exposure of Savile as a paedophile led to extensive media coverage, including 41 days on the front pages. In June 2014, Health Secretary Jeremy Hunt announced that the investigations into Savile's activities at 28 NHS hospitals, including Leeds General Infirmary and Broadmoor psychiatric hospital, concluded that he had sexually assaulted staff and patients aged between 5 and 75 over several decades. In response to the documentary, the Metropolitan police launched the Operation Yewtree police investigation, which led to the convictions of high-profile celebrities (including Rolf Harris, Max Clifford, and Gary Glitter). The victims of Harris and Clifford credited the exposure of Savile as giving them the confidence to come forward.

Williams-Thomas presented the follow-up documentary The Jimmy Savile Investigation later that year. The Other Side of Jimmy Savile and Exposure: Banaz: An Honour Killing won the 2012 Peabody Award which was broadcast on 3 October 2012. In 2013, Williams-Thomas won two Royal Television Society awards and the London Press Awards Scoop of the Year for the film. In September 2013, MP Tim Loughton made a statement to Parliament in which he praised Williams-Thomas for his "modest but game-changing ITV documentary that exposed Jimmy Savile".

In April 2022, in an interview discussing the Netflix documentary Jimmy Savile: A British Horror Story, Williams-Thomas revealed concern about it, saying that the series might be harmful to Savile's victims due to his face being featured throughout, stating that, "I do worry as far as victims go, it's one of the things that strongly gets criticised now when the story's talked about, seeing his face - his picture on the front page. For those victims to see his face consistently over and over again, that is very traumatic for them." Williams-Thomas made similar remarks in October 2023 about the crime drama series The Reckoning, which recounted Savile's crimes, in particular in the portrayal of an incident based on Claire McAlpine, who committed suicide aged 15 and left behind a note making allegations against several disc jockeys. Williams-Thomas criticised the casting of the character's race from white to Asian, and was criticised for his comments about the character's race.

=== 2016- ===
From 2016 to 2020, Williams-Thomas was the reporter for ITV's crime series The Investigator: A British Crime Story, produced by Simon Cowell's Syco. Among other cases, the series re-examined a 30 year old previously 'closed' murder case, the murder of Carole Packman, and the case of murdered student Jessie Earl, who disappeared from Eastbourne in 1980, her remains being found in 1989. From 2020 on, Williams-Thomas has presented his own podcast, The Detective, in which he has continued to investigate cold cases and contemporary cases. In September 2020 following the arrest of Charles and Doris Clark on suspicion of the murder of their 23-year-old son Steven, who disappeared in December 1992, Williams-Thomas was given exclusive access to follow the family for a TV documentary while they were under police investigation.

On 10 February 2023, Williams-Thomas publicly criticised police handling of the disappearance of Nicola Bulley, and their theory that Bulley had drowned in the river, telling media that it was more likely Bulley had 'disappeared' herself, or been 'taken by force', and urging police to conclude their search of the river 'as soon as possible' in order to focus on other areas. However, on 19 February, two walkers found Bulley's body in the river, about one mile (1.5 kilometres) downstream of St Michael's on Wyre, with the inquest, which concluded in June 2023, determining that Bulley's death had been due to accidental drowning. In contract to Williams-Thomas' criticisms, the official report, published in November 2023, praised the police investigation, describing it as "very well conducted and resourced".

In June 2024, Williams-Thomas reached out to offer the family of Jay Slater assistance, going out to Tenerife to join the search for the teenager, and taking a high media profile in the case. Williams-Thomas initially indicated that a "criminal network" with "links to drugs, theft and violent crime" was being considered as a motive for Slater's disappearance, however would later claim that he had always believed it to be a 'tragic accident'. Despite claiming his involvement in the Jay Slater case was to help the family, Slater's mum Debbie Duncan would go on to strongly criticise Williams-Thomas for his part, accusing him of using it as a 'PR stunt', withholding information, and saying that Williams-Thomas' actions had "knocked her back a million steps". In October 2024 Duncan asked Williams-Thomas to step back from the case.

In December 2023, Williams-Thomas released a YouTube documentary, The Interview: Baroness Mone and the PPE Scandal, described by Williams-Thomas on his social media as a "WORLD EXCLUSIVE PROGRAMME". Although the documentary was purportedly to investigate the government's controversial "VIP Lane" at the start of the COVID-19 pandemic, it was entirely funded by PPE Medpro, and featured a series of sympathetic interviews with Michelle Mone and Douglas Barrowman, both of whom were facing allegations of fraud and bribery and received significant public backlash for their association with PPE Medpro. Williams-Thomas faced criticism for allegedly 'duping' experts into taking part in his documentary, not having declared who was funding it, and producing a documentary intended to 'salvage the reputation' of Mone and Barrowman. Williams-Thomas defended his PPE Medpro documentary, admitting that it was fully funded by PPE Medpro, but claiming that he had 'full editorial control' over the content. A strapline stating that PPE Medpro fully funded the documentary is inserted into the documentary, around 1 hour and 11 minutes in. The Guardian revealed that in addition to producing a documentary for Mone and Barrowman's company, Williams Thomas had been working as a private investigator for the couple, raising issues of conflict of interest.

Williams-Thomas continues to be active on social media, commenting on cases and giving details of his own projects. In September 2025 he posted his latest video stating his belief that Christian Brückner is innocent in the Disappearance of Madeleine McCann.

== Filmography ==
- To Catch a Paedophile (series) (2009; ITV)
- Tonight: Bullies online (2010; ITV)
- On The Run (series) (2011–13; ITV)
- Exposure: The Other Side of Jimmy Savile (2012; ITV)
- Exposure: The Jimmy Savile Investigation (2012; ITV)
- Missing Without Trace (2012; ITV)
- Bamber: The New Evidence (2012; ITV)
- Living With a Killer (2013; ITV)
- Exposure: Predators Abroad (2013; ITV)
- Exposure: Inside the Diplomatic Bag (2014; ITV)
- Oscar Pistorius: The Interview (2016; ITV)
- The Investigator: A British Crime Story (Series 1 2016; ITV)
- The Investigator: A British Crime Story (Series 2 2018; ITV)
- The Interview: Baroness Mone and the PPE Scandal (2023; YouTube)

== Publications ==
- Hunting Killers: Britain's top crime investigator reveals how he solves the unsolvable. Bantam Press, 2019, ISBN 978-1787631311

== See also ==
- Chris Clark – fellow British author who has also produced documentaries and written on unsolved crimes
