= List of prisons in the United Kingdom =

List of prisons in the United Kingdom is a list of all 142 current prisons as of 2024 in the United Kingdom spread across the three UK legal systems of England and Wales (123 prisons), Scotland, (15 prisons) and Northern Ireland (4 prisons). Also included are a number of historical prisons no longer in current use.

== Prisons, prison services, prison population and prisoner categories ==
=== England, Wales, Scotland and Northern Ireland ===
Public Sector prisons in England and Wales are managed by His Majesty's Prison Service (HMPPS), which is part of the His Majesty's Prison and Probation Service, an executive agency of the United Kingdom government. In addition, since the 1990s the day-to-day running of a number of previously existing prisons, as well as several new facilities, has been "contracted out" to private companies, such as Serco and G4S. All prisons in England and Wales, whether publicly or privately run, are inspected by His Majesty's Inspectorate of Prisons. Prisons in Scotland are run by the Scottish Prison Service and prisons in Northern Ireland are run by the Northern Ireland Prison Service.

The following tables below list all current and some historical prisons and Young Offender Institutions in use in the three UK legal systems of England and Wales, Scotland and Northern Ireland as of 2022. The majority house adult males, and are operated by each legal systems respective public prison service, although a small number are operated by private prison companies. There are also a small number of adult female prisons and youth prisons/secure children's units for those under 18.

=== Population ===
As of 2021, the total prison population of the UK (England & Wales, Scotland and Northern Ireland combined) stands at roughly 87,000, one of the largest in the Western world. With the increasing population, law changes resulting in longer prison sentences and a national government prison building program to build 20,000 more prison spaces by the mid 2020s the total UK prison population is expected to increase to almost 110,000 by 2026.

=== United Kingdom prisoner categories and establishment types ===
In the UK adult prisoners are divided into 4 security categories (though male and female categories are slightly different) depending on certain factors such as the offences they have been convicted or accused of, their likelihood of attempting an escape, the threat they would pose if they escaped, their length of sentence, and any of their previous criminal convictions, if any. Male categories are as follows,

Category A – 'Those whose escape would be highly dangerous to the public or national security'. Typically for example those convicted of offences such as murder, manslaughter, terrorism, rape, wounding with intent (GBH), robbery, serious firearm and explosives offences, offences against the state, those sentenced under the Official Secrets Act, or any attempts of those offences. There are a total of ten Category A prisons in the UK, eight are located in England and Wales, one in Scotland and one in Northern Ireland. HM Prison Belmarsh is an example of a Category A prison. They are the equivalent of a supermax/maximum security prison in the United States for example.

Category B – 'Those who do not require maximum security, but for whom escape still needs to be made very difficult'. Typically for those convicted of the same types offences as category A prisoners, but who are not judged to be as high risk or those who have served a long time as a category A prisoner with good behaviour/rehabilitation are sometimes downgraded to category B. HM Prison Wormwood Scrubs is an example of a Category B prison. They are the equivalent of a medium security prison in the United States for example.

Category C – 'Those who cannot be trusted in open conditions but who are unlikely to try to escape'. Typically for those convicted of minor offences and who are serving shorter sentences no more than a few years in length. Also category B prisoners coming to the end of their sentence are sometimes downgraded to category C to prepare them for release. HM Prison Berwyn is an example of a Category C prison. They are the equivalent of a minimum security prison in the United States for example.

Category D – 'Those who can be reasonably trusted not to try to escape, and are given the privilege of an open prison'. Category D prisoners are held in "Open Prisons" in which they are trusted to be able to move freely around the prison without risk and who after completing a risk assessment may be allowed to work outside of the prison in the community or allowed short home visits for a set number of hours a week. Also category C prisoners coming to the end of their sentence are sometimes downgraded to category D to prepare them for release. HM Prison Ford is an example of a Category D prison. They are the equivalent of a minimum security work release prison or local jail in the United States for example.

Adult women in England and Wales are categorised with four slightly different types of security levels, from lowest to highest being Open, Closed, Restricted Status and Category A '. However Category A for women is rarely used due to the fairly low number of women being held for such serious offences, meaning most are held either in Closed or Restricted Status conditions. Northern Ireland operates a similar system to England and Wales. Scotland operates a separate three category system, from lowest to highest being Low, Medium and High Supervision (High Supervision being similar to Category A for adults in England, Wales and Northern Ireland).

Additionally whereas males and females aged 18 or over are held in dedicated adult prisons, those under 18 (and sometimes under 21) are held in one of three types of establishments across the country that are run by either the public prison service, private companies (such as G4S or Serco), local council authorities and in rare cases some charity providers. They are,

Young Offender Institutions (YOIs) which are prison based establishments very similar to adult prisons that hold those convicted and remanded for offences but that only hold males aged 15–20 (ages 15–17 and ages 18–20 are housed separately) and who are not classed as vulnerable.

Secure Training Centres (STCs) which are secure custody establishments but that focus more on things such as education, welfare, health and support rather than traditional prison style punishment. They hold convicted males aged 12–14 and females aged 12–17 in separate accommodation. Though males aged 15–17 can be held also if they are classed as vulnerable.

Secure Children's Homes (SCHs) which are similar to STC's in that they mainly focus on things like education, welfare, health and support rather than traditional prison style punishment. They hold very young males and females aged 10–11 convicted or remanded usually for only serious offences. Though males and females aged 12–14 can be held also if they are classed as vulnerable. Additionally males and females all the way up to the age of 17 can be held if they are refused bail and remanded (but not yet convicted) to be held by local children's authorities (and not the prison service) usually if they are more vulnerable, at risk or a YOI is not suitable. It should also be noted that not all children held in SCHs have necessarily been convicted, remanded or accused of crimes, some are held by court orders on safety grounds under legislation such as the Children Act 1989 due to things like their history of absconding from regular open children's care homes, risk of committing harm to themselves or others, or those at high risk of vulnerability from things such as forms of abuse, illicit drugs use and child prostitution.

More can be found here: Prisoner security categories in the United Kingdom.

== Prisons and Young Offender Institutions ==
=== England and Wales (His Majesty's Prison Service) ===
| Name | Location | County | Operator | Capacity | Notes | Category | Type |
|---|---|---|---|---|---|---|---|
| Altcourse | Liverpool | Merseyside | G4S | 1324 | Male adults and young offenders | B | HMP |
| Ashfield | Pucklechurch | Gloucestershire | Serco | 400 | Adult sex offenders | C | HMP |
| Askham Grange | Askham Richard | North Yorkshire | | 128 | Female adults and young offenders | Open | HMP & YOI |
| Aylesbury | Aylesbury | Buckinghamshire | | 443 | Formerly YOI | C | HMP |
| Bedford | Bedford | Bedfordshire | | 506 | Males adults and young offenders | B | HMP |
| Belmarsh | Thamesmead | London | | 910 | Belmarsh accepts a wide variety of categories of prisoners | A | HMP |
| Berwyn | Wrexham | Wrexham County Borough | | 2106 | Male adult. Largest prison in the UK. | C | HMP |
| Birmingham | Birmingham | West Midlands | | 1450 | Previously known as Winson Green | B, C | HMP |
| Brinsford | Featherstone | Staffordshire | | 569 | Young offenders | B, C | HMP & YOI |
| Bristol | Horfield | Bristol | | 614 | Male adults and young offenders | B | HMP |
| Brixton | Brixton | London | | 798 | Training establishment | C | HMP |
| Bronzefield | Ashford | Surrey | Sodexo Justice Services | 569 | Female adults and young offenders | A | HMP & YOI |
| Buckley Hall | Rochdale | Greater Manchester | | 381 | Male adults | C | HMP |
| Bullingdon | Arncott | Oxfordshire | | 1114 | Male adults | B, C | HMP |
| Bure | Coltishall | Norfolk | | 624 | Male adults, sex offenders | C | HMP |
| Cardiff | Adamsdown | Cardiff | | 784 | Male adults | B | HMP |
| Channings Wood | Denbury | Devon | | 731 | Specialises in delivering the Sex Offender Treatment Programme (SOTP). | C | HMP |
| Chelmsford | Chelmsford | Essex | | 695 | Male adults and young offenders | B | HMP & YOI |
| Coldingley | Bisley | Surrey | | 513 | Training prison | C | HMP |
| Cookham Wood | Borstal | Kent | | 157 | Male Adults. Re-roled from a Male YOI in July 2024 | C | HMP |
| Dartmoor | Princetown | Devon | | 646 | Training prison | C | HMP |
| Deerbolt | Startforth | County Durham | | 453 | Training prison and young offenders | C | HMP & YOI |
| Doncaster | Doncaster | South Yorkshire | Serco | 1145 | Male adults, young offenders and sex offenders | B | HMP |
| Dovegate | Uttoxeter | Staffordshire | Serco | 860 | Male adults training prison | B | HMP |
| Downview | Banstead | Surrey | | 358 | Female adults and young offenders. Closed in 2013 and reopened in 2016 after refurbishment | Closed | HMP |
| Drake Hall | Yarnfield | Staffordshire | | 315 | Female adults and young offenders. Specializes in foreign nationals | Closed | HMP & YOI |
| Durham | Durham | County Durham | | 981 | Male adults and young offenders on remand | B | HMP |
| East Sutton Park | Sutton Valence | Kent | | 100 | Female adults and young offenders | Open | HMP & YOI |
| Eastwood Park | Falfield | Gloucestershire | | 362 | Female adults | Closed | HMP & YOI |
| Erlestoke | Erlestoke | Wiltshire | | 470 | Male adults | C | HMP |
| Exeter | Exeter | Devon | | 533 | Male adults and young offenders | B | HMP |
| Featherstone | Featherstone | Staffordshire | | 702 | Training establishment | C | HMP |
| Feltham | Feltham | London | | 762 | Young offenders, including Under-18s | C | HMP & YOI |
| Ford | Arundel | West Sussex | | 557 | Male adults. | D | HMP |
| Forest Bank | Pendlebury | Greater Manchester | Sodexo Justice Services | 1424 | Male adults and young offenders | B | HMP |
| Fosse Way | Glen Parva | Leicestershire | Serco | 1715 | | C | HMP |
| Foston Hall | Foston, Derbyshire | Derbyshire | | 290 | Female adults and young offenders | Closed | HMP & YOI |
| Five Wells | Wellingborough | Northamptonshire | G4S | 1680 | Male adults | C | HMP |
| Frankland | Brasside | County Durham | | 750 | Male adults including Category A High Risk and Category B adult males | A | HMP |
| Full Sutton | Full Sutton | East Riding of Yorkshire | | 608 | Male adults | A | HMP |
| Garth | Ulnes Walton | Lancashire | | 847 | Training establishment | B | HMP |
| Gartree | Market Harborough | Leicestershire | | 869 | | B | HMP |
| Grendon | Grendon Underwood | Buckinghamshire | | 235 | | B | HMP |
| Guys Marsh | Shaftesbury | Dorset | | 578 | | C | HMP |
| Hatfield | Hatfield Woodhouse | South Yorkshire | | 260 | Male adults and young offenders | D | HMP & YOI |
| Haverigg | Haverigg | Cumbria | | 644 | Male adults | C | HMP |
| Hewell | Tardebigge | Worcestershire | | 1431 | | B | HMP |
| High Down | Banstead | Surrey | | 1208 | Male adults | C | HMP & YOI |
| Highpoint North | Stradishall | Suffolk | | 379 | Male adults. Previously known as Edmunds Hill. | C | HMP |
| Highpoint South | Stradishall | Suffolk | | 944 | Male adults | C | HMP |
| Hindley | Bickershaw | Greater Manchester | | 440 | Adult Males | C | HMP & YOI |
| Hollesley Bay | Woodbridge | Suffolk | | 330 | Male adults and young offenders | D | HMP & YOI |
| Holme House | Stockton-on-Tees | County Durham | | 1211 | Male adults | C | HMP |
| Hull | Kingston upon Hull | East Riding of Yorkshire | | 1044 | Male adults and young offenders | B | HMP & YOI |
| Humber | Brough | East Riding of Yorkshire | | 1064 | Male adults, Resettlement | C | HMP |
| Huntercombe | Nuffield | Oxfordshire | | 365 | Young offenders | C | HMP |
| Isis | Thamesmead | London | | 622 | Young offenders | C | HMP & YOI |
| Isle of Wight (Albany) | Newport | Isle of Wight | | 567 | | B | HMP |
| Isle of Wight (Parkhurst) | Newport | Isle of Wight | | 536 | | B | HMP |
| Kirkham | Kirkham | Lancashire | | 590 | | D | HMP |
| Kirklevington Grange | Kirklevington | North Yorkshire | | 283 | | D | HMP |
| Lancaster Farms | Lancaster | Lancashire | | 549 | | C | HMP |
| Leeds | Leeds | West Yorkshire | | 1004 | Formerly known as Armley Gaol. | B | HMP |
| Leicester | Leicester | Leicestershire | | 392 | | B | HMP |
| Lewes | Lewes | East Sussex | | 723 | Male adults and young offenders | B | HMP |
| Leyhill | Tortworth | Gloucestershire | | 532 | | D | HMP |
| Lincoln | Lincoln | Lincolnshire | | 738 | | B | HMP & YOI |
| Lindholme | Hatfield Woodhouse | South Yorkshire | | 990 | Part of site used as Immigration Removal Centre | C, D | HMP |
| Littlehey | Perry | Cambridgeshire | | 1200 | Extension holding 480 male young offenders to open January 2010 | C | HMP |
| Liverpool | Liverpool | Merseyside | | 1184 | | B, C | HMP |
| Long Lartin | South Littleton | Worcestershire | | 622 | | A | HMP |
| Low Newton | Brasside | County Durham | | 336 | Female adults and young offenders | Closed | HMP & YOI |
| Lowdham Grange | Lowdham | Nottinghamshire | Serco | 690 | | B | HMP |
| Maidstone | Maidstone | Kent | | 600 | Foreign Nationals | C | HMP |
| Manchester | Manchester | Greater Manchester | | 1269 | Previously known as Strangeways | A | HMP |
| Millsike | Full Sutton | East Riding of Yorkshire | | 1500 | | C | HMP |
| Moorland | Hatfield Woodhouse | South Yorkshire | | 1006 | Male adults and young offenders | C | HMP & YOI |
| Morton Hall | Morton Hall | Lincolnshire | | 392 | Adult Male Foreign Nationals | C | HMP |
| New Hall | Flockton | West Yorkshire | | 446 | Female adults and young offenders | Closed | HMP & YOI |
| Northumberland | Acklington | Northumberland | Sodexo Justice Services | 1348 | Created by merging HMP Acklington and HMP Castington | C | HMP |
| North Sea Camp | Freiston | Lincolnshire | | 306 | | D | HMP |
| Norwich | Norwich | Norfolk | | 767 | Male adults and young offenders | B, C | HMP & YOI |
| Nottingham | Nottingham | Nottinghamshire | | 549 | | B | HMP |
| Oakwood | Featherstone | Staffordshire | G4S | 1605 | | C | HMP |
| Onley | Rugby | Warwickshire | | 742 | Male adults, training and resettlement | C | HMP |
| Parc | Bridgend | Mid Glamorgan | G4S | 1800 | Male adults and young offenders, including Under-18s. Opened in 1997. | B | HMP & YOI |
| Pentonville | Barnsbury | London | | 1250 | | B, C | HMP & YOI |
| Peterborough | Peterborough | Cambridgeshire | Sodexo Justice Services | 840 | Male adults (480) and female adults (360) | B | HMP |
| Portland | Easton | Dorset | | 624 | Young offenders | C | HMP & YOI |
| Prescoed | Usk | Monmouthshire | | 178 | Young offenders; Satellite of Usk | D | HMP & YOI |
| Preston | Preston | Lancashire | | 750 | | B | HMP |
| Ranby | Ranby | Nottinghamshire | | 1098 | | C | HMP |
| Risley | Warrington | Cheshire | | 1085 | | C | HMP |
| Rochester | Rochester | Kent | | 695 | Young offenders | C | HMP & YOI |
| Rye Hill | Barby | Northamptonshire | G4S | 664 | | B | HMP |
| Send | Send | Surrey | | 282 | Female adults | Closed | HMP |
| Elmley (Sheppey Cluster) | Eastchurch | Kent | | 985 | Male adults and young offenders | B, C | HMP |
| Standford Hill (Sheppey Cluster) | Eastchurch | Kent | | 462 | | D | HMP |
| Swaleside (Sheppey Cluster) | Eastchurch | Kent | | 1132 | | B | HMP |
| Stafford | Stafford | Staffordshire | | 741 | | C | HMP |
| Stocken | Stretton | Rutland | | 806 | | C | HMP |
| Stoke Heath | Stoke Heath | Shropshire | | 632 | Young offenders | C | HMP & YOI |
| Styal | Styal | Cheshire | | 459 | Female adults and young offenders | Closed | HMP & YOI |
| Sudbury | Sudbury | Derbyshire | | 581 | | D | HMP |
| Swansea | Sandfields | Swansea | | 422 | | B, C | HMP |
| Swinfen Hall | Swinfen | Staffordshire | | 624 | Male adults and young offenders | C | HMP & YOI |
| Thameside | Thamesmead | London | Serco | 1200 | | B | HMP |
| The Mount | Bovingdon | Hertfordshire | | 1100 | Adult Category C | C | HMP |
| The Verne | Portland | Dorset | | 600 | Male adults, sex offenders | C | HMP |
| Thorn Cross | Appleton Thorn | Cheshire | | 321 | Young offenders | D | HMP & YOI |
| Usk | Usk | Monmouthshire | | 250 | | C | HMP |
| Wakefield | Wakefield | West Yorkshire | | 751 | Also known as 'Monster Mansion' | A | HMP |
| Wandsworth | Wandsworth | London | | 1665 | | B, C | HMP |
| Warren Hill | Woodbridge | Suffolk | | 222 | Young offenders | C | HMP |
| Wayland | Griston | Norfolk | | 1017 | | C | HMP |
| Wealstun | Thorp Arch | West Yorkshire | | 527 | | C | HMP |
| Werrington | Werrington | Staffordshire | | 162 | Young offenders, including Under-18s | YOI | HMYOI |
| Wetherby | Wetherby | West Yorkshire | | 360 | Young offenders, including Under-18s | YOI | HMYOI |
| Whatton | Whatton-in-the-Vale | Nottinghamshire | | 841 | | C | HMP |
| Whitemoor | March | Cambridgeshire | | 448 | | A | HMP |
| Winchester | Winchester | Hampshire | | 544 | Male adults | B | HMP & YOI |
| Woodhill | Milton Keynes | Buckinghamshire | | 819 | | B | HMP & YOI |
| Wormwood Scrubs | Wormwood Scrubs | London | | 1277 | Male adults | B | HMP |
| Wymott | Ulnes Walton | Lancashire | | 1144 | | C | HMP |

HMP The Verne is now acting as a public sector category C prison.

==== Former prisons ====
| Name | Location | County | Notes |
|---|---|---|---|
| Abingdon | Abingdon | Oxfordshire | Built 1812 as the county gaol for Berkshire, closed 1874, redeveloped in the 1960s. |
| Aldington | Aldington | Kent | Closed 1999 |
| Ashwell | Ashwell | Rutland | Closed March 2011, awaiting re-development |
| Beaumaris | Beaumaris | Anglesey | Historic, now a museum |
| Belle Vue | Manchester | Greater Manchester | Historic |
| Blantyre House | Goudhurst | Kent | Closed 2015 |
| Blundeston | Blundeston | Suffolk | 1960–2013 |
| Bocardo | Oxford | Oxfordshire | Historic |
| Bodmin | Bodmin | Cornwall | Historic |
| Bullwood Hall | Hockley | Essex | Closed 2013 |
| Camp Hill Prison | Newport | Isle of Wight | Closed 2013 |
| Canterbury Prison | Canterbury | Kent | Closed 2013 |
| The Clink | Southwark | London | Historic |
| Coldbath Fields | Clerkenwell | London | Closed 1885 |
| Dorchester | Dorchester | Dorset | Closed 2013 |
| Dalton Castle | Dalton-In-Furness | Cumbria | |
| Eden Camp | Malton | North Yorkshire | World War II prisoner of war camp |
| Finnamore Wood | Marlow | Buckinghamshire | Closed 1996, awaiting redevelopment |
| Fisherton Gaol | Salisbury | Wiltshire | Closed 1870 |
| Fleet | Holborn | London | Historic |
| Galleries of Justice | Nottingham | Nottinghamshire | Historic |
| Gatehouse | Westminster | London | Historic |
| Glen Parva | Leicester | | Young offenders, closed June 2017. HMP Fosse Way now stands on the same site. |
| Gloucester | Gloucester | Gloucestershire | Closed 2013 Open as tourist attraction |
| Hexham | Hexham | Northumberland | Historic |
| Holloway | Islington | London | Closed 2016. |
| Kennet | Maghull | Merseyside | Closed 2016. |
| King's Bench | Southwark | London | Historic |
| Kingston | Portsmouth | Hampshire | Closed 2013 |
| Lancaster Castle | Lancaster | Lancashire | Closed 2011, still used as a Crown Court centre |
| Latchmere House | Richmond upon Thames | London | Closed September 2011, awaiting re-development |
| Launceston Castle | Launceston | Cornwall | Historic |
| Lincoln Castle | Lincoln | Lincolnshire | Historic – prison block built 1787, housed prisoners until 1878, now open to the public as a historical visitor attraction |
| Marshalsea | Southwark | London | Historic |
| Millbank | Westminster | London | Historic |
| Newgate | Bristol | Bristol | Historic |
| Newgate | City of London | London | Historic |
| Norman Cross | Peterborough | Cambridgeshire | Historic |
| Northallerton | Northallerton | North Yorkshire | Closed 2014 |
| Poultry Compter | City of London | London | Historic |
| Prince Rupert's Tower | Liverpool | Merseyside | Historic |
| Reading | Reading | Berkshire | A prison dating from 1844 housing up to 320 men. Closed in 2013. |
| Ruthin Gaol | Ruthin | Denbighshire | Historic, Now owned by county council and used as records office, some areas open as tourist attraction |
| Oxford | Oxford | Oxfordshire | Closed 1996, redeveloped as a shopping and heritage complex |
| Shepton Mallet | Shepton Mallet | Somerset | Closed 2013 Open as tourist attraction |
| Shrewsbury | Shrewsbury | Shropshire | Closed 2013 Open as tourist attraction |
| Tothill Fields Bridewell | Westminster | London | Historic |
| Tower of London | Whitechapel | London | Historic |
| Wallingford | Wallingford | Oxfordshire | Historic |
| Warwick | Warwick | Warwickshire | Historic. Opened in 1860, closed in 1916 and demolished in 1934 |
| Weare | Portland | Dorset | Prison Ship – closed 2005 |
| Wellingborough | Wellingborough | Northamptonshire | Closed 2012 |
| Wood Street Counter | Wood Street | London | Historic |

=== Northern Ireland (Northern Ireland Prison Service) ===
The following table lists the three active prisons in Northern Ireland. All three are operated by the Northern Ireland Prison Service. There is also a Juvenile Justice Centre, located in Bangor, County Down, which is operated by the Youth Justice Agency.

| Name | Location | County | Capacity | Gender | Juvenile (10–18) | Young offender (18–21) | Adult | Adult security category |
|---|---|---|---|---|---|---|---|---|
| HMP Maghaberry | Lisburn | County Antrim | 745 | Male | ✗ | ✗ | ✓ | High |
| HMP Magilligan | Limavady | County Londonderry | 452 | Male | ✗ | ✗ | ✓ | Low |
| HMP Hydebank Wood | Belfast | County Down | 306 | Male/Female | ✗ | ✓ | ✓ | Medium |
| Woodlands JJC | Bangor | County Down | 48 | Male/Female | ✓ | ✗ | ✗ | |

==== Former prisons ====
| Name | Location | County | Notes |
|---|---|---|---|
| Maze | Mazetown | County Down | Began as Long Kesh Detention Centre in 1971, before expanding to become HM Prison Maze in 1976. Well-known during The Troubles, it housed paramilitary prisoners from its establishment until its closure in 2000. |
| Belfast | Belfast | County Antrim | Also known as the Crumlin Road Gaol. Opened in 1846 and closed in 1996. |
| Armagh | Armagh | County Armagh | Also known as Armagh Gaol. Dates back to 1780 and closed in 1986. Held predominantly female prisoners. |

=== Scotland (Scottish Prison Service) ===
| Name | Location | Council area | Notes |
|---|---|---|---|
| Addiewell | Addiewell | West Lothian | Private – Sodexo Justice Services |
| Barlinnie | Riddrie | Glasgow | |
| Castle Huntly | Longforgan | Perth and Kinross | |
| Stirling | Stirling | Stirling | Opened in 2023 |
| Dumfries | Dumfries | Dumfries and Galloway | |
| Edinburgh | Edinburgh | Edinburgh | |
| Glenochil | Tullibody | Clackmannanshire | |
| Grampian | Peterhead | Aberdeenshire | |
| Greenock | Greenock | Inverclyde | |
| Inverness | Inverness | Highland | |
| Kilmarnock | Hurlford, Kilmarnock | East Ayrshire | |
| Low Moss | Bishopbriggs | East Dunbartonshire | |
| Perth | Perth | Perth and Kinross | |
| Polmont | Falkirk | Falkirk | Young Offenders Institute |
| Shotts | Shotts | North Lanarkshire | |

==== Former prisons ====
| Name | Location | Council area | Notes |
|---|---|---|---|
| Aberdeen | Aberdeen | Aberdeen | Closed 2014 |
| Bass Rock | Firth of Forth | East Lothian | |
| Calton Gaol | Edinburgh | Edinburgh | Gaol closed in 1927 |
| Cornton Vale | Stirling | Stirling | Closed in April 2023 |
| Duke Street | Glasgow | Glasgow | Closed 1955, demolished 1958 |
| Inveraray Jail | Inveraray | Argyll and Bute | Historic |
| Jedburgh Castle | Jedburgh | Scottish Borders | Historic |
| Noranside | Forfar | Angus | Closed 2011 |
| Peterhead | Peterhead | Aberdeenshire | Closed 2013 |
| Stonehaven Tolbooth | Stonehaven | Aberdeenshire | Historic |
| The Tolbooth | Aberdeen | Aberdeen | Historic |
| Old Tolbooth | Edinburgh | Edinburgh | Historic |
| HM Prison Penninghame | Newton Stewart | Dumfriesshire | Closed 2000 |
| HM Prison Dungavel | Strathaven | South Lanarkshire | Closed 2001 |
| HM Prison Longriggend | Longriggend | North Lanarkshire | Closed 2000 |
| HM Prison Friarton | Perth | Perthshire | Closed 2010 |
| HM Prison Zeist | Utrecht | Netherlands | Closed |

== Future prisons ==
| Name | Location | Council area | Notes |
|---|---|---|---|
| HM Prison Highland | Inverness | Highland | Planned to open 2026. Replacing HM Prison Inverness. |

== See also ==
- United Kingdom prison population
- Slopping out
- Immigration detention in the United Kingdom
