= HM Prison Service =

Government service managing most of the prisons within England and Wales

His Majesty's Prison Service

Executive Agency overview
- Jurisdiction: England and Wales, United Kingdom
- Headquarters: 102 Petty France, London
- Minister responsible: Catherine McKinnell, Minister of State for Prisons, Probation and Reducing Reoffending
- Executive Agency executives: James McEwen, director general, CEO; Michelle Jarman-Howe, director general, prison operations
- Parent department: Ministry of Justice
- Website: www.gov.uk/government/organisations/hm-prison-and-probation-service

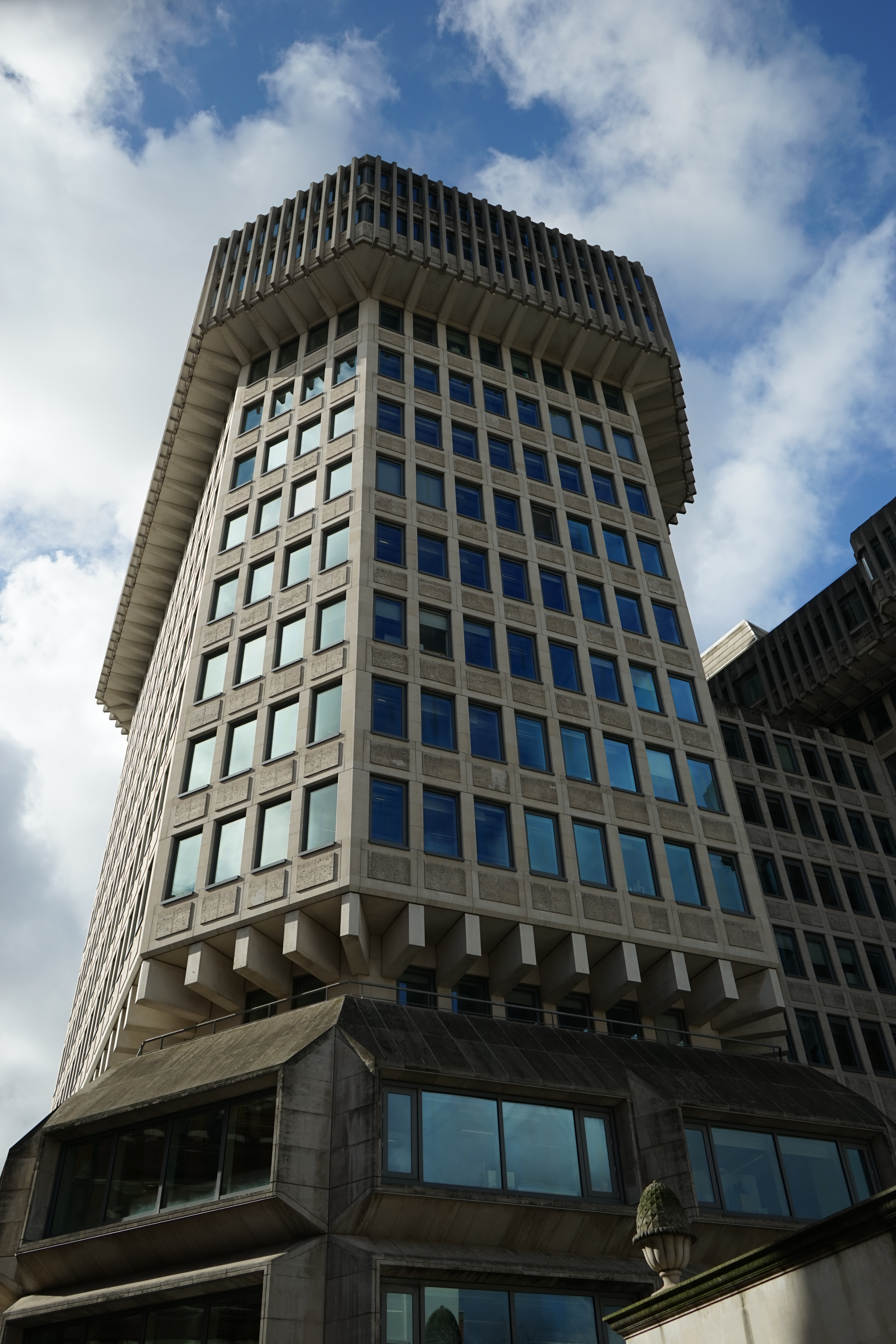
102 Petty France, headquarters of HM Prison and Probation Service

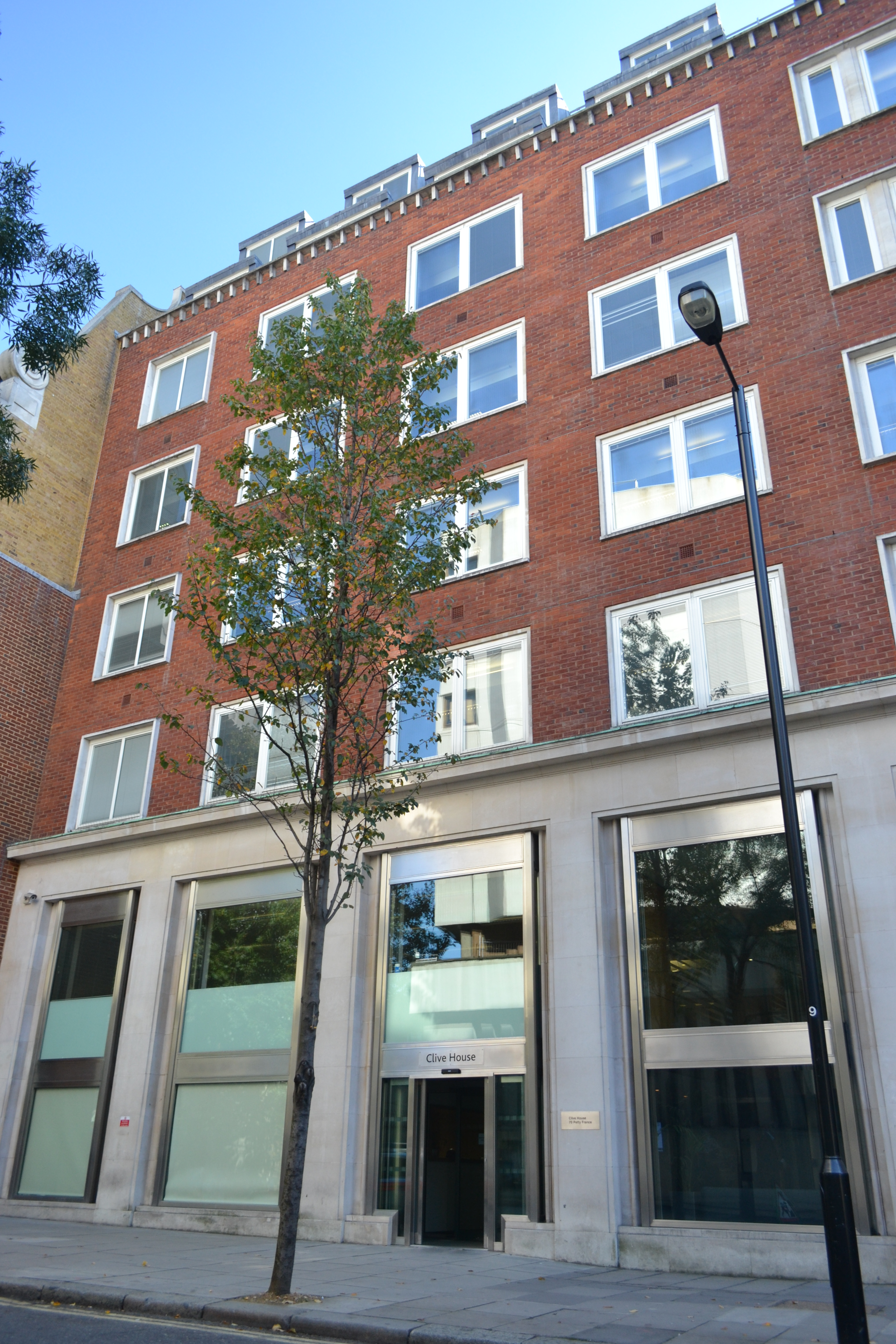
Clive House, former head office of HM Prison Service

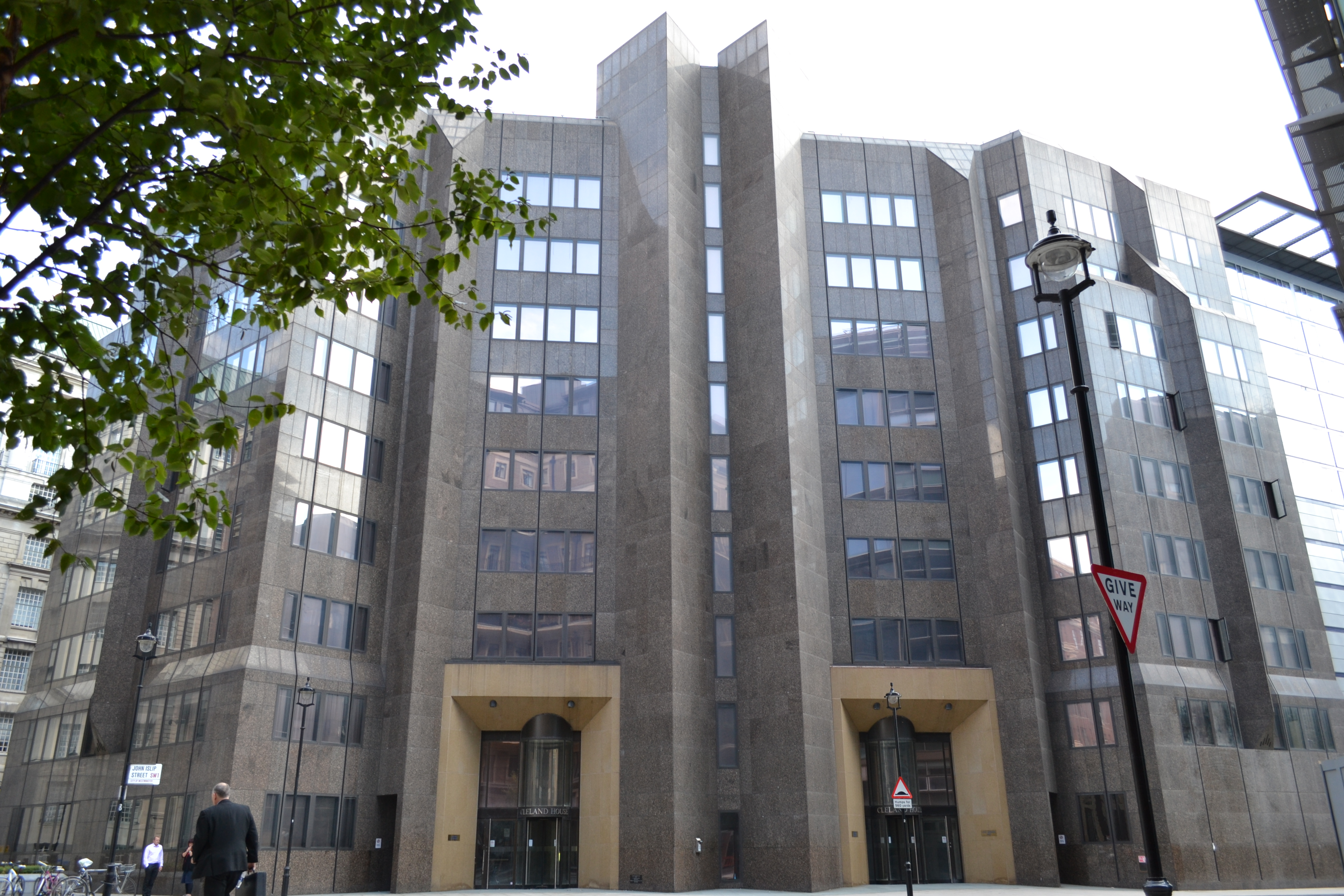
Cleland House (now demolished), another former head office of HM Prison Service

His Majesty's Prison Service (HMPS) is a part of HM Prison and Probation Service (formerly the National Offender Management Service), which is the part of His Majesty's Government charged with managing most of the prisons within England and Wales (Scotland and Northern Ireland have their own prison services: the Scottish Prison Service and the Northern Ireland Prison Service, respectively).

There are three Director General roles in HMPPS: director general CEO, James McEwen, director general prison operations, Michelle Jarman-Howe, and director general probation operations, Jim Barton. The director general CEO reports to the Ministry of Justice Permanent Secretary (Dr Jo Farrar) and works closely with both the Secretary of State for Justice and Prisons Minister, a junior ministerial post within the Ministry of Justice.

The statement of purpose for His Majesty's Prison Service states that "[His] Majesty's Prison Service serves the public by keeping in custody those committed by the courts. Our duty is to look after them with humanity and help them lead law abiding and useful lives in custody and after release". The Ministry of Justice's objective for prisons seeks "Effective execution of the sentences of the courts so as to reduce re-offending and protect the public".

It has its head office in 102 Petty France in London, and it had previous head offices in Clive House (also situation on Petty France) and Cleland House in the City of Westminster, London.

== Operation ==
In 2004, the Prison Service was responsible for 130 prisons and employed around 44,000 staff. As of 2009, the number of prisons had risen by one (of which 11 were privately owned).

Population statistics for the service are published weekly. Those for 24 June 2016 counted 85,130 prisoners; 95.47% were male. Those for the year to 31 March 2019 showed a fall to 83,013 (annual average); 95% were male.

HMPPS has a duty to implement the sentences and orders of the courts, to protect the public and to rehabilitate offenders. There are various ways a prisoner can be purposefully rehabilitated; including education, training, work and undertaking targeted accredited programmes.

Prisoners in England and Wales have a daily regime which might include employment and training on temporary licence outside of prison. In financial year 2018/19, 12,100 prisoners on average were employed in custody, delivering 17.1 million hours worked over the year. Average monthly net earnings per prisoner was £1,083 before the Prisoner Earnings Act (PEA) levy was applied.

On 31 March 2019, there were 37,735 staff in post. This was an increase of 2,452 staff on 31 March 2018, when a total of 35,293 were staff in post. Over the two-year period from 31 March 2017 to the latest year, 4,894 extra staff were in post (32,841 staff were in post on 31 March 2017).

== History ==
=== 18th century ===
During the eighteenth century, a wide variety of measures were used to punish crime, including fines, the pillory, and whipping. Until 1776, transportation to the American colonies was often offered as an alternative to the death penalty; which could be imposed for many offences including pilfering. When prison spaces were exhausted in 1776, sailing vessels (hulks) were used for temporary confinement.

The most notable reformer was high sheriff of Bedfordshire John Howard. Having visited several hundred prisons across England and Europe, Howard published The State of the Prisons in 1777. He discovered prisoners who were confined, despite being acquitted, as they could not pay the jailer's fees. Howard proposed that each prisoner should be in a separate cell, with separate sections for female felons, male felons, young offenders, and debtors. The prison reform charity, the Howard League for Penal Reform, is Howard's namesake.

The Penitentiary Act passed in 1779 following Howard's agitation. It introduced solitary confinement, religious instruction, a labour regime, and proposed two state penitentiaries: one for men and one for women. These were never built due to disagreements in the committee and pressures from wars with France, so jails remained a local responsibility. But other measures passed in the next few years providing magistrates with the powers to implement many of these reforms. In 1815 jail fees were abolished.

=== 19th century ===
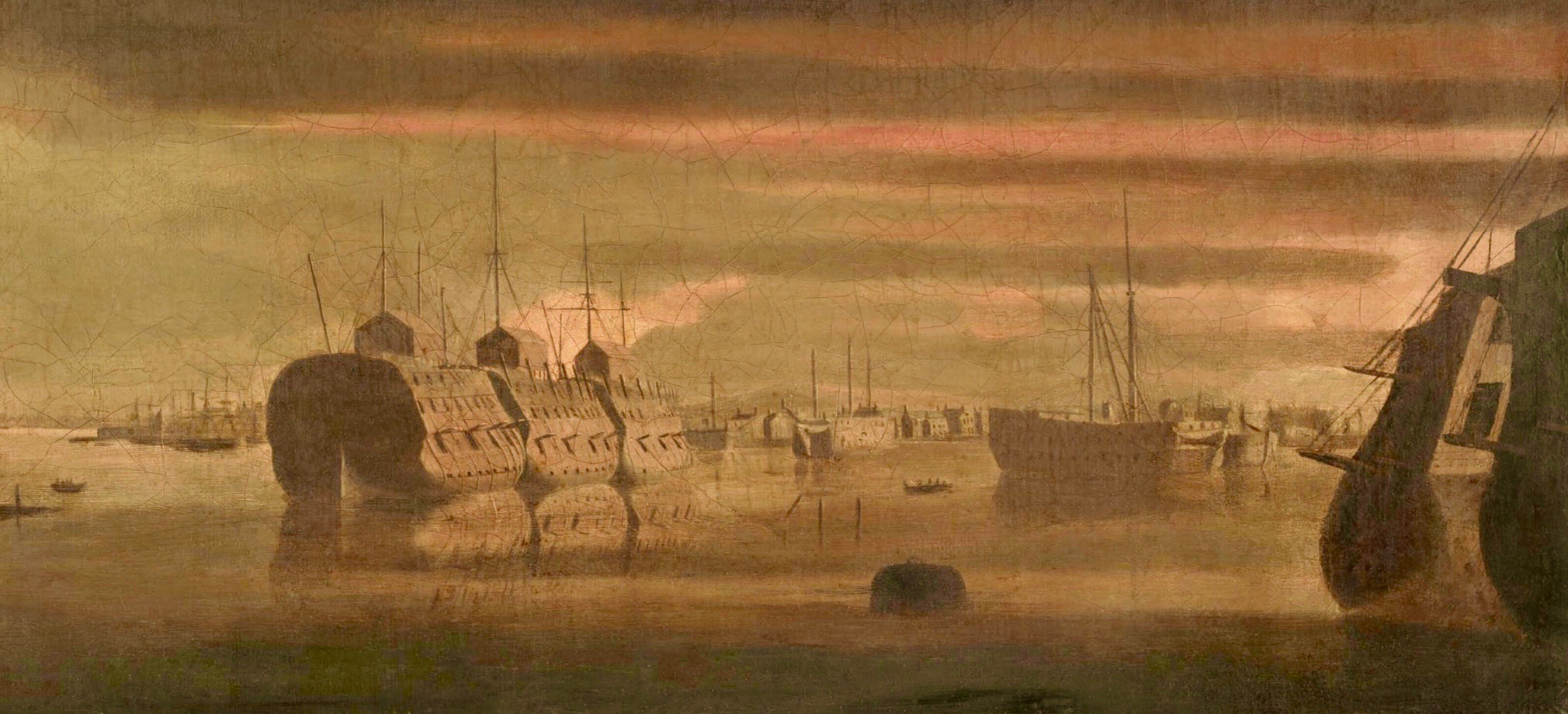
Prison hulks in the River Thames (painting c. 1814)

Quakers such as Elizabeth Fry continued to publicise the dire state of prisons as did Charles Dickens about the Marshalsea in his novels David Copperfield and Little Dorrit. Samuel Romilly managed to repeal the death penalty for theft in 1806, but repealing it for other similar offences brought in a political element that had previously been absent. The Society for the Improvement of Prison Discipline, founded in 1816, supported both the Panopticon for the design of prisons and the use of the treadwheel as a means of hard labour. By 1824, 54 prisons had adopted this means of discipline. Robert Peel's Gaols Act 1823 (4 Geo. 4. c. 64) attempted to impose uniformity in the country but local prisons remained under the control of magistrates until the Prison Act 1877.

The American separate system attracted the attention of some reformers and led to the creation of Millbank Prison in 1816 and Pentonville prison in 1842. By now the end of transportation to Australia and the use of hulks was in sight and Joshua Jebb set an ambitious program of prison building with one large prison opening per year.

The main principles were separation and hard labour for serious crimes, using tread-wheels and cranks. However, by the 1860s public opinion was calling for harsher measures in reaction to an increase in crime which was perceived to come from the 'flood of criminals' released under the penal servitude system. The reaction from the committee set up under the commissioner of prisons, Colonel Edmund Frederick du Cane, was to increase minimum sentences for many offences with deterrent principles of 'hard labour, hard fare, and a hard bed'. In 1877 he encouraged Disraeli's government to remove all prisons from local government and held a firm grip on the prison system till his forced retirement in 1895. He also established a tradition of secrecy which lasted till the 1970s so that even magistrates and investigators were unable to see the insides of prisons. By the 1890s the prison population was over 20,000.

The British penal system underwent a transition from harsh punishment to reform, education, and training for post-prison livelihoods. The reforms were controversial and contested. From 1877, a series of major legislative reforms enabled significant improvement in the penal system. In 1877, the previously localised prisons were nationalised in the Home Office under a Prison Commission. The Prison Act 1898 enabled the Home Secretary to enact multiple reforms on his own initiative, without going through the politicised process of Parliament.

=== 20th Century ===
The Probation of Offenders Act 1907 introduced a new probation system that drastically cut down the prison population, while providing a mechanism for the transition back to normal life. The Criminal Justice Administration Act 1914 required courts to allow a reasonable time before imprisonment was ordered for people who did not pay their fines. Previously tens of thousands of prisoners had been sentenced solely for that reason. The Borstal system after 1908 was organised to reclaim young offenders, and the Children Act 1908 (8 Edw. 7. c. 67) prohibited imprisonment under age 14, and strictly limited that of ages 14 to 16. The principal reformer was Sir Evelyn Ruggles-Brise, the chair of the Prison Commission.

==== Winston Churchill ====
Major reforms were championed by the Liberal Party government in 1906–1914. The key player was Winston Churchill when he was the Liberal Home Secretary, 1910–1911. He first achieved fame as a prisoner in the Boer war in 1899. He escaped after 28 days and the media, and his own book, made him a national hero overnight. He later wrote, "I certainly hated my captivity more than I have ever hated any other in my whole life. ... Looking back on those days I've always felt the keenest pity for prisoners and captives." As Home Secretary he was in charge of the nation's penal system. Biographer Paul Addison says. "More than any other Home Secretary of the 20th century, Churchill was the prisoner's friend. He arrived at the Home Office with the firm conviction that the penal system was excessively harsh." He worked to reduce the number sent to prison in the first place, especially those imprisoned for their delay in paying fines, or for debts. He shortened their terms, and made life in prison more tolerable, and rehabilitation more likely. His reforms were not politically popular, but they had a major long-term impact on the British penal system.

==== Borstal system ====
In 1894–1895, Herbert Gladstone's Committee on Prisons showed that criminal propensity peaked from the mid-teens to the mid-twenties. He took the view that central government should break the cycle of offending and imprisonment by establishing a new type of reformatory, that was called Borstal after the village in Kent which housed the first one in 1902. The movement reached its peak after the first world war when Alexander Paterson became commissioner, delegating authority and encouraging personal responsibility in the fashion of the English public school: cellblocks were designated as 'houses' by name and had a housemaster. Cross-country walks were encouraged, and no one ran away.

Borstal populations remained at a low level until after the Second World War when Paterson died and the movement was unable to update itself. Some aspects of Borstal found their way into the main prison system, including open prisons and housemasters (renamed assistant governors), and many Borstal-trained prison officers used their experience in the wider service.

In 1988, borstals were replaced with young offender institutions for those aged 18-20, and secure children’s homes for those aged 10-17. Education, training and support are still the main focuses.

==== Later reforms ====
In general, the prison system in the twentieth century remained in Victorian buildings which steadily became more and more overcrowded with inevitable results.

In 1979, the government of Margaret Thatcher began implementing the "short, sharp shock" programme. However, it was soon found to have had no effect on reoffending, with more than half of offenders being convicted again within a year, and was abandoned.

=== 21st century ===
Early in 2004, it was announced that the Prison Service would be integrated into a new National Offender Management Service later in the year.

In 2008, there were plans for rationalisation of the prison management system with the advent of the Titan Prison concept, however these were abandoned in 2009.

In 2016, six existing prisons were designated "reform prisons", with prison governors given autonomy in terms of operation and budget. Penal charities claimed reforms would fail if prisoners were "crammed into filthy institutions with no staff". The reforms have not expand beyond the first six prisons as planned, as the necessary legislation has stalled due to the 2017 UK general election.

In 2017, the National Offender Management Service (NOMS) became Her Majesty's Prison and Probation Service (HMPPS), now known as His Majesty's Prison and Probation Service following Charles III's accession to the throne in September 2022.

== Current issues ==
The imprisonment rate for England and Wales is the highest in western Europe, and at roughly the "midpoint" worldwide. The prison population numbered 83,165 in August 2018. The Ministry of Justice projected that this would rise to 86,400 by March 2023. The government plans to increase the time some prisoners spend in prison.

Recent issues affecting the prison system include overcrowding, lower levels of staffing and the increased availability of synthetic cannabinoids and drones for smuggling. Despite a fall in crime rates between 2010 and 2016, the prison population continued to rise, while staff numbers were reduced, with the number of prison officers being reduced from 25,000 in 2010 to about 18,000 in 2015. There has been a particularly sharp rise in the number of prisoners above the age of 60. The head of the Prison Governors' Association suggested in 2017 that prison sentences of less than a year should be replaced with alternative punishments. Another issue is the age of several prisons. A 2015 announcement from the government agreed that old prisons are more expensive to run and often unsuitable in design, such as having "dark corners which too often facilitate violence and drug-taking."

In July 2018, the Government announced "a £30 million investment including £16 million to improve conditions for prisoners and staff and £7 million on new security measures, including airport-security style scanners, improved searching techniques and phone-blocking technology".

In The Lammy Review, a report commissioned by the Conservative government and led by David Lammy MP, it was found that whilst adult prison populations are 24% BAME individuals, only 6% of prison staff were from Black and Minority Ethnic communities. This was one of the significant factors listed as the cause for mis-trust between BAME prisoners and prison staff which then impacts the percentage of black and minority ethnic prisoners that have access to rehabilitation programmes in prison and therefore, increase their chances of re-offending after leaving prison.

In 2019, data showed that male prisoners in the UK are 3.7 times more likely to die by suicide than the UK general public.

== Prison officers ==
=== Recent development ===
Historically, uniformed prison staff were under the supervision of a small number of very senior and experienced officers who held one of three chief officer ranks. Below these were the ranks of principal officer (rank badge – two Bath stars) and senior officer (rank badge – single Bath star). However, a reorganisation in the 1980s, termed "A Fresh Start", saw these chief officer ranks abolished, and their role taken by junior grade prison governors.

From 2000 onwards, as part of a process to increase accountability within the prison service, all operational officers have been assigned a three-digit unique identification number, worn on all items of uniform (typically as an embroidered epaulette) along with the two-digit LIDS identification code of the specific prison or institution. From 2010 onwards, attempts were made to replace the principal officer rank with non-uniformed junior managers (developing prison service managers – DPSM), although this process was neither entirely successful nor fully implemented. Further restructuring in 2013, known as "Fair & Sustainable", saw the remaining historic ranks and rank insignia phased out in favour of a new structure, and simple stripes on uniform epaulettes to indicate grades.

=== Uniforms ===
Prison officers wear a white shirt and black tie, black trousers, black boots, black 'Nato' jumper or black soft shell fleece-jacket (or both).

Prison officers working in the Juvenile or Immigration Detention estate wear a 'soft uniform' consisting of a polo shirt opposed to white shirt with black tie.

For formal occasions, a dark tunic with whistle on a chain is worn with a tie and peaked cap for men and bowler cap and open collar for women. Black gloves and shoes are worn, as are any medals/ribbons that have been awarded. Rank is worn on epaulettes and on the shoulders of uniforms.

=== Powers and structure ===
Public sector prison officers (historically known as warders), under the Prison Act 1952, have "all the powers, authority, protection and privileges of a constable" whilst acting as such.

Under the Assaults on Emergency Workers (Offences) Act 2018 it is an offence to assault (amongst others) a prison officer and is punishable by up to twelve months in prison, as well as a fine. Murder of a prison officer who was acting in the execution of their duty at the time can result in a whole life order being imposed.

Although the system is flexible in operation, most prison officers work in small teams, either assigned to a specific duty, or providing one shift of staff for the supervision of a particular wing within a prison.

Each such team is, in many instances, led by a supervising officer.

An overall manager of the wing has the title of custodial manager. They have direct management of the wing and the line management of the officers and supervising officers.

=== Equipment ===
Most prison officers, when working on the landings, carry:

- baton – usually an Monadnock AutoLock 21” in length, for self-defence
- radio – for communication between officers and the control room
- keys – worn on a long key-chain
- body cameras – worn on the chest
- rigid-bar handcuff – TCH 842 like the Hiatt speedcuffs type are being phased in as part of general issue kit
- PAVA spray – see below.

In 2018, it was reported by the GOV UK website that prison officers would start to be equipped with PAVA incapacitating spray:

"HMPPS are rolling out PAVA incapacitant sprays to all male category A-D prisons to help keep our prison officers safe and better maintain control when difficult situations arise."

The government said that this would be "fully rolled out by April 2019" and that "the decision follows a successful trial by HM Prison and Probation Service (HMPPS) at 4 prisons". The four prisons involved in the trial were HMPs Hull, Preston, Risley and Wealstun.

In 2023, the government reported that now all HM Prison officers "have access to" body worn video cameras.

=== Rank insignia ===
HM Prison Service rank insignia
Historic rank insignia in use until 1987
| Rank | Prison officer | Senior prison officer | Principal prison officer | Assistant chief officer | Chief officer (Grade II) | Senior chief officer (Grade I) |
| Insignia | | | | | | |
Rank insignia from the "A Fresh Start" initiative, 1987–2000
| Rank | Prison officer | Senior officer | Principal officer | | | |
| Insignia | | | | The chief officer grades were abolished and replaced with junior governor grades. | | |
Revised rank insignia with LIDS code and unique identification numbers, 2000–2013
| Rank | Operational support grade (OSG) | Prison officer | Senior officer | Principal officer | (Specialist officer) | |
| Insignia | | | | | Additionally authorised letters could be used to indicate specialist functions: DH – dog handler W – works officer H – healthcare officer | |
Current rank insignia introduced from April 2013
| Rank | Operational support grade (OSG) | Prison officer | Supervising officer | Custodial manager | (Specialist officer) | |
| Insignia | | | | | Specialist officers have role identification letters on their epaulettes: DH – dog handler W – works officer H – healthcare officer | |

=== Location prefixes ===
- AY: HMP Aylesbury
- BA: HMP Belmarsh
- BF: HMP Bedford
- BL: HMP Bristol
- BM: HMP Birmingham
- BN: HMP Bullingdon
- BS: HMP Brinsford
- BW: HMP Berwyn
- BX: HMP Brixton
- CD: HMP/YOI Chelmsford
- CF: HMP Cardiff
- CL: HMP Coldingley
- CW: HMP Channings Wood
- DM: HMP Durham
- DN: HMP Doncaster
- DT: HMP Deerbolt
- DW: HMP Downview
- EE: HMP Erlestoke
- EW: HMP Eastwood Park
- EX: HMP Exeter
- EY: HMP Elmley
- FD: HMP Ford
- FH: HMP Foston Hall
- FK: HMP Frankland
- FM: HMP/YOI Feltham
- FN: HMP Full Sutton
- FS: HMP Featherstone
- GH: HMP Garth
- HC: HMP Huntercombe
- HE: HMP Hewell
- HH: HMP Holme House
- HL: HMP Hull
- HM: HMP Humber
- HO: HMP High Down
- HP: HMP Highpoint
- HV: HMP Haverigg
- IS: HMP/YOI Isis
- KV: HMP Kirklevington Grange
- LE: HMP Leeds
- LF: HMP Lancaster Farms
- LH: HMP Lindholme
- LI: HMP Lincoln
- LL: HMP Long Lartin
- LP: HMP Liverpool
- LW: HMP Lewes
- MD: HMP Moorland
- MH: HMP Morton Hall
- MR: HMP Manchester
- MT: HMP The Mount
- NM: HMP Nottingham
- ON: HMP Onley
- PD: HMP Portland
- PN: HMP Preston
- PV: HMP Pentonville
- RS: HMP Risley
- SF: HMP Stafford
- SK: HMP Stocken
- ST: HMP Styal
- SW: HMP Swansea
- SN HMP Swinfen Hall
- TS: HMP Thameside
- UK: HMP Usk and Prescoed
- WC: HMP Winchester
- WD: HMP Wakefield
- WE: HMP Wealstun
- WL: HMP Wayland
- WR: HMP Whitemoor
- WS: HMP Wormwood Scrubs
- WW: HMP Wandsworth

=== Specialist roles ===
In addition to uniformed officers carrying out security and custodial roles, a number of specialist functions exist within every prison. Some are assigned to uniformed specialist officers, while others are carried out by non-uniformed support staff.

Before the "Fresh Start" initiative there were more uniformed specialist officer roles, including dog handlers, works officers, hospital officers, catering officers, physical education officers, and officer instructors. Today the uniformed specialist officer roles include dog handlers (DH), works officers (W), and healthcare officers (H) and physical exercise instructors (PEI) who are the successors of the former hospital officers. The roles of the former catering officers, PE officers, and officer instructors are today taken by non-uniformed caterers, PE instructors, and educational/vocational instructors. Other key non-uniformed roles within the staff of a prison include chaplains, psychologists, and administrators.

The service also maintains the National Tactical Response Group, consisting of specially-trained prison officers designed to respond to serious disorder and hostage-taking incidents in prisons out of the scope of local "Tornado-trained" teams.

== Private prisons ==
Privately managed prisons were introduced in the 1990s. Currently, there are 15 prisons in the UK run by third parties: HMP Altcourse, HMP Ashfield, HMP Bronzefield, HMP Doncaster, HMP Dovegate, Five Wells Prison, HMP Forest Bank, HMP Lowdham Grange, HMP Oakwood, HMP Parc, HMP Peterborough, HMP Rye Hill, HMP Thameside and HMP Northumberland. These are run by three third party contractor companies: G4S, Serco and Sodexo.

== Ban on industrial action ==
Questions were raised about the status of the POA (Prison Officers' Association) in the 1990s. In 1994, a legal decision determined that it was illegal to induce prison officers to take industrial action – a law which had applied to police officers since 1919 – meaning that the POA could not call strike action amongst its members. New labour legislation introduced by the Conservative government in 1992 laid down that the POA could no longer be a trade union. This was reversed in the Criminal Justice and Public Order Act 1994, but prison officers were still denied the right to take industrial action. This right was restored in March 2005 to prison officers in the public sector in England, Wales and Scotland, (Note: The right was restored by repealing the relevant prohibitions contained in the Criminal Justice and Public Order Act 1994.This was done using a statutory instrument created under the Regulatory Reform Act 2001, specifically The Regulatory Reform (Prison Officers) (Industrial Action) Order 2005.) but not in Northern Ireland or to prison custody officers in the private sector.

On 29 August 2007, the POA started a 24-hour walkout of prisons, picketing establishments asking prison officers not to attend work for their shift. This was the first ever national strike action taken by the POA. The POA reported that 90% of its members (27,000) went on strike that day.

In January 2008, the Home Secretary announced that the government was to introduce legislation to remove the right for prison officers in England and Wales to take strike action. This legislation was enacted as section 138 of the Criminal Justice and Immigration Act 2008. (Note: Section 138 also contains a provision, subsection 5, reinstating the ban on industrial action by prison officers in Scotland. However, this provision has, as of August 2023, yet to be commenced.) In November 2016, the High Court approved a government request to stop industrial action taking place. In July 2017 the government won a High Court bid to obtain a permanent ban on industrial action by prison officers.

== Independent monitoring board ==
Every prison and immigration removal centre has an independent monitoring board (IMB), formerly known as a board of visitors. Members of the IMB, who are volunteers, are appointed by the Home Secretary and act as 'watchdogs' for both the Minister of Prisons and the general public, to ensure that proper standards of care and decency are maintained. An analysis of the reporting of IMBs found that while there may be some problems with their training and undertaking of duties, their monitoring and surveillance of the detention estate can be more than symbolic and may further the humane and just treatment of the state's most vulnerable citizens.

== HMPS in the National Offender Management Service ==
On 6 January 2004, then Home Secretary David Blunkett announced that the Prison Service, together with the National Probation Service, was to be integrated into a new National Offender Management Service. The service, Blunkett said, will be "a new body to provide end-to-end management of all offenders".

On 1 April 2008, NOMS was reorganised as part of a shake-up in the Ministry of Justice. The headquarters and regional structures of NOMS and HMPS were merged into a single HQ structure with Phil Wheatly as director general of NOMS. This brings HMPS and the National Probation Service under a single headquarters structure for the first time ever.

On 1 June 2011, NOMS was merged with the wider MoJ (HMCTS etc.) to form one organisation. Although HMCTS and NOMS are working under different terms and conditions, they are now managed together and HR is dealt with by one shared service centre. A review of terms and conditions for all MoJ staff, including NOMS, is currently in progress with view to bringing all staff terms and conditions across NOMS and HMCTS in line.

== See also ==
His Majesty's prison service collection is held at the Galleries of Justice Museum in Nottingham.

- Centre for Crime and Justice Studies
- His Majesty's Inspectorate of Prisons
- His Majesty's Young Offender Institution
- HM Prison
- Howard League for Penal Reform
- Inquest (charity)
- List of prisons in the United Kingdom
- Northern Ireland Prison Service
- OASys
- Prison Advice and Care Trust
- Prison categories in the United Kingdom
- Prison Reform Trust
- Prisoners' Advice Service
- Prisoner Escort and Custody Services
- Scottish Prison Service
- Temporary licence
- United Kingdom prison population
- Young offender

== Sources ==
- Morris, Norval; Rothman, David J. (1995). The Oxford History of the Prison: The Practice of Punishment in Western Society. Oxford University Press. ISBN 978-0-19-506153-6.
- Fox, Lionel W. (1952). The English Prison and Borstal Systems. London: Routledge. doi:10.4324/9781315007854. ISBN 9781136266386.
