= HM Prison Acklington =

Former prison in Northumberland, England

Coordinates: 55°17′46″N 1°38′04″W

HMP Acklington
- Interactive map of HMP Acklington
- Location: Acklington, Northumberland
- Status: closed
- Security class: Adult Male/Category C
- Population: 946 (August 2008)
- Opened: 1972
- Closed: 2011
- Managed by: Sodexo Justice Services
- Governor: Matt Spencer
- Website: Northumberland at justice.gov.uk

HM Prison Acklington was a Category C men's prison, located near the village of Acklington (a few miles from Amble), in Northumberland, England. Acklington Prison was operated by Her Majesty's Prison Service. In 2011 Acklington was merged into the newly named HM Prison Northumberland.

HMP Acklington was the most northerly adult prison in England, and was built on the site of the former RAF Acklington airfield.

== History ==
Acklington Prison opened in 1972, and was soon branded a holiday camp by the local media due to lax security and comfortable conditions for inmates. When the prison's security problems were at their worst, there were 14 escapes in one year. A review of security was undertaken in 1990 after a spate of escapes, including one in which a jogger trotted away from a supervised group and scaled the fence. Several weeks later two inmates hijacked a milk float and used it to dodge security.

Acklington came in for further criticism in September 2002 when prefabs were constructed at the prison to house inmates due to overcrowding. A month later staff passed a vote of no confidence in governor Peter Atkinson, citing safety concerns over job cuts at the prison.

In November 2004, three prisoners were involved in a disturbance which caused extensive damage to a wing of Acklington Prison. The inmates were protesting about being recently jailed, and were segregated after the incident.

In July 2011, it was announced that Acklington along with several other publicly operated prisons, would be market tested, allowing private operators as well as HM Prison service, to tender for the contract to operate the prison.

On 31 October 2011 HM Prison Acklington merged with HM Prison Castington to form HMP Northumberland and on 1 December 2013 management of HMP Northumberland passed from Her Majesty's Prison Service to Sodexo Justice Services.

== The prison until October 2011 ==
Acklington is a category C prison for adult male prisoners, with many being sex offenders. Education and vocational courses at the prison include: Woodwork; Tailoring and Textiles; Industrial workshops; Engineering workshops; Painting and Decorating; Bricklaying; Amenity Gardening; Market Gardening; Laundry; Physical Education; Waste Management and Catering, all of which include accredited qualifications. The prison also offers accredited Offending Behaviour programmes which include Drug Rehabilitation facilities, Sex Offender Programmes, Enhanced Thinking Skills, and Healthy Relationships programmes.
