= HM Prison Castington =

Former prison in Northumberland, England

Coordinates: 55.2961°N 1.6337°W

HMP Castington
- Interactive map of HMP Castington
- Location: Acklington, Northumberland
- Security class: Juveniles/Young Offenders
- Population: 400 (September 2010)
- Managed by: Sodexo Justice Services
- Governor: Matt Spencer
- Website: Northumberland at justice.gov.uk

HM Prison Castington was a male juvenile's prison and Young Offenders Institution, located in the village of Acklington in Northumberland, England. The prison was operated by His Majesty's Prison Service. In 2011 the facility was merged into the newly named HM Prison Northumberland.

Castington Prison was the most northerly Young Offenders Institution in England, and was built on the site of the former RAF Acklington airfield.

== History ==
Castington Prison was subject to a hostage crisis in 1997 when a prison officer was held hostage by two inmates for nineteen hours. At least two small fires were lit at the prison by inmates during the disturbance. Castington was involved in more controversy in 2001 when the Prison Reform Trust named it as the most violent detention centre in England.

Various improvements to the regime and facilities at Castington were implemented over the next few years with positive results. In 2005 the prison was declared a safe, respectful and purposeful environment by His Majesty's Chief Inspector of Prisons.

In July 2011, it was announced that Castington along with several other publicly operated prisons, would be market tested, allowing private operators as well as HM Prison service, to tender for the contract to operate the prison.

On 31 October 2011 HM Prison Castington merged with HM Prison Acklington to form HMP Northumberland and on 1 December 2013 management of HMP Northumberland passed from Her Majesty's Prison Service to Sodexo Justice Services.

== The prison until October 2011 ==
Castington has the capacity to accommodate 128 sentenced and unsentenced juveniles (aged 15–17), 40 trainees (aged 15–17), as well as 120 sentenced and 120 unsentenced young offenders (aged 18–21). The prison is divided into seven units, all of which are equipped with integral sanitation.

The prison provides full-time education and vocational training geared towards GCSEs, GNVQs and City and Guilds qualifications for all inmates. Facilities at Castington include a library, fully equipped gym and sports pitches. In addition the prison's P.E. Department organise various sports teams and competitions. The prison chaplaincy includes eight members from various Christian denominations as well as an imam.

Castington's Healthcare Centre has nursing cover 24 hours per day with seven in-patient beds and a Primary Care area. Outpatient facilities include a daily GP surgery with access to a dentist, optician, and podiatrist, as well as specialised mental health services.
