= HM Prison Northumberland =

Prison in Northumberland, England

Coordinates: 55°17′46″N 1°38′04″W

HMP Northumberland
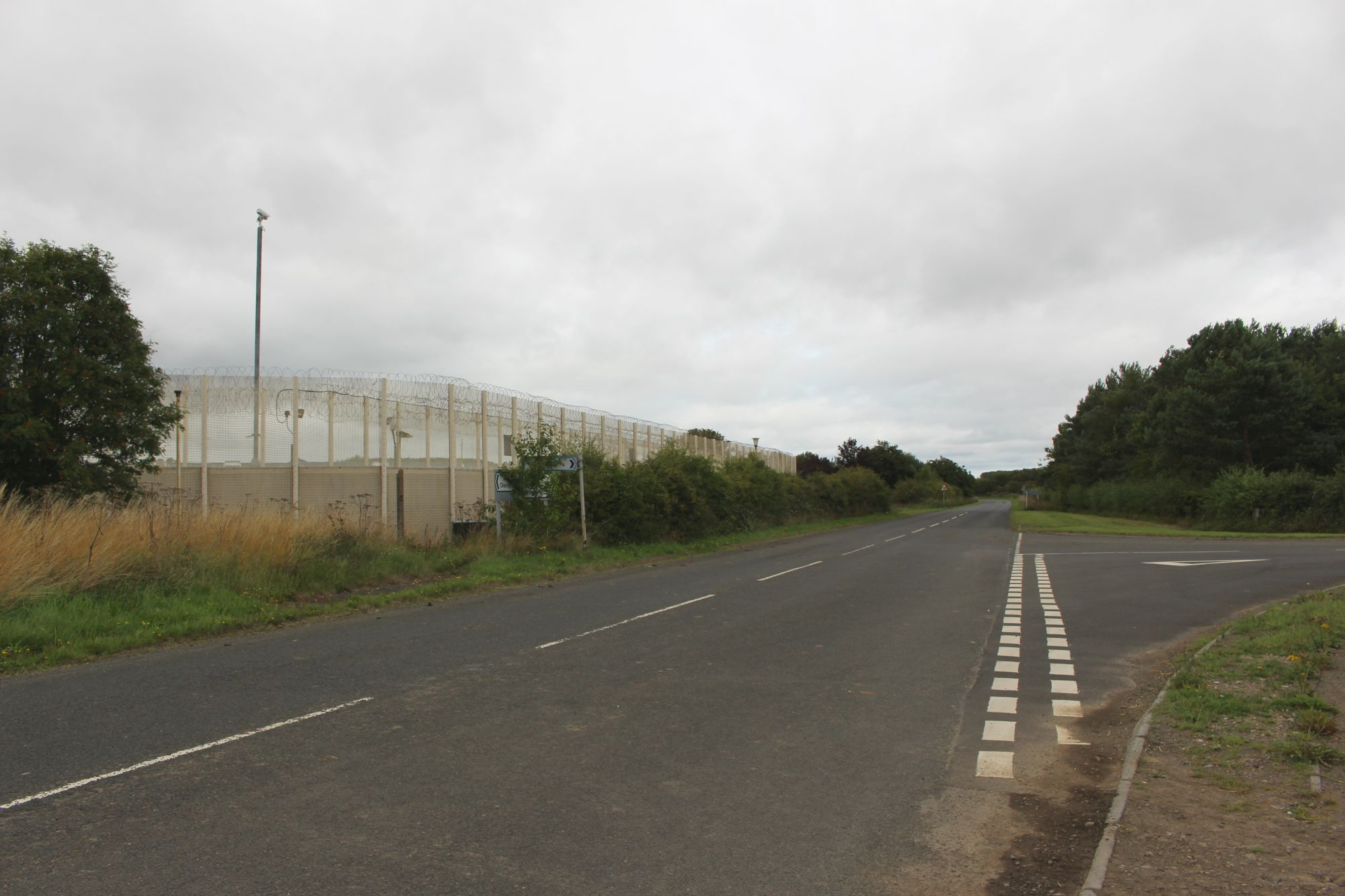
- Boundary fence of HMP Northumberland
- Interactive map of HMP Northumberland
- Location: Morpeth, Northumberland
- Security class: Adult Male/Category C
- Population: 1348 (January 2017)
- Opened: 2011 (from merger of previous facilities)
- Managed by: Sodexo Justice Services
- Director: Vicky Robinson
- Website: Northumberland at justice.gov.uk

HM Prison Northumberland is a Category C men's prison, located near the village of Acklington in Northumberland, England. Since 2013 Northumberland has been operated by private prison firm Sodexo Justice Services under contract with His Majesty's Prison Service. Healthcare services are provided by Spectrum Community Health CIC.

== History ==
Northumberland was formed on 31 October 2011 from a merger of HM Prison Acklington and HM Prison Castington and on 1 December 2013 management of HMP Northumberland passed from Her Majesty's Prison Service to Sodexo Justice Services. HMP Acklington was the most northerly adult prison in England, and was built on the site of the former RAF Acklington airfield.

When Sodexo Justice Services began management of Acklington Prison in 2013, the firm promised to save taxpayers' money and many jobs were lost. The Prison Officers Association warned at the time this could cause escapes and riots.

In March 2014, there was a "major incident" after more than fifty prisoners took over a wing at the former Acklington Prison. In August 2014 a prison officer was hospitalised by an inmate. In response to this incident Mike Quinn, vice chairman of the Northumbria branch of NAPO, made a statement criticising the "violent culture" at the institution which could cause an incident unable to be dealt with due to reduced staffing levels. Between 2010 and 2013 staff at HMP Northumberland were reduced from 441 to 270.

Fires broke out in six cells in November 2014 and seven inmates were evacuated from the prison. Following the evacuation there were violent incidents in the exercise yard. Inmates surrendered after additional officers were deployed. Firefighters tackled the blazes.

A 2017 BBC Panorama investigation found illegal drugs rife and prison staff "not in control". Staff were unable to confront prisoners due to lack of back up and prisoners threatened staff. Some door alarms did not work. Single prison officers dealt with large groups of prisoners. A hole in an internal security fence was found where prisoners could get out and find drugs or other contraband thrown over the prison fence. Prisoners were sometimes incapacitated by drugs.

In April 2024, RAAC was discovered across the site, requiring a number of buildings and House blocks to be closed.
