= Kalyx =

Kalyx may refer to:

- A ring name of American professional wrestler Jessika Carr
- The former name of British prison operator Sodexo Justice Services
