= HM Prison Wellingborough =

Former prison in Northamptonshire, England

Coordinates: 52.285°N 0.692°W

HMP Wellingborough
- Interactive map of HMP Wellingborough
- Location: Wellingborough, Northamptonshire
- Status: Demolished
- Security class: Adult Male/Category C
- Population: 646 (December 2006)
- Opened: 1963
- Closed: 2012
- Managed by: HM Prison Services
- Website: Wellingborough at justice.gov.uk

HM Prison Wellingborough was a Category C men's prison, located in Wellingborough, Northamptonshire, England. The prison was previously operated by Her Majesty's Prison Service and was retained as reserve site for use in the event of other prisons being at capacity. HM Prison Five Wells was built on the site of the prison following its demolition in 2019.

== History ==
Opened as a Borstal in 1963, Wellingborough continued to hold Young Offenders until 1990, when it was converted to a Category C Training Prison for male adults.

In December 2003, an inspection report from Her Majesty's Chief Inspector of Prisons stated that Wellingborough was not meeting the criteria for its role as a training prison. Inspectors found that only half the prisoners were working or in education, with the other half locked up for extended periods of time. The report also noted that the prison had an out of date race relations policy. However, inspectors also highlighted Wellingborough's good overall safety record, as 80% of inmates reported that they felt safe and 75% reported that staff treated them with respect. Wellingborough was also praised for its induction programme and reception procedures.

In July 2004, a missionary from Wellingborough Prison was imprisoned for trying to smuggle heroin and cannabis into the jail. The missionary had been a Prison Service-authorised Sikh leader, licensed by The Sikh Missionary Society UK to visit prisons to see Sikh inmates. He had attempted to smuggle the drugs into the prison by hiding them in an airmail letter and envelope.

On 17 July 2012, UK Justice Secretary Kenneth Clarke announced that HMP Wellingborough would be closed by the end of the year, claiming it would save the tax payer £10m a year. The prison formally closed on 21 December 2012. At the time prisons minister Jeremy Wright indicated that the site could be used as a prison again in the future. However, in December 2013 the Ministry of Justice instructed a commercial property consultant to make initial assessments of the site for redevelopment in to housing. In June 2014 Jeremy Wright stated in a parliamentary written answer to Wellingborough constituency MP Peter Bone that Wellingborough Prison would be retained in a mothballed state for reserve capacity. It was confirmed in June 2018 that a new category C prison will be built on the current site.

The new category C prison is called HMP Five Wells and opened in 2022. It has a capacity of 1680 prisoners and is operated by G4S. The name of the prison reflects the five wells in the area, which feature in Wellingborough's coat of arms.
