= HM Prison Millsike =

Prison in the East Riding of Yorkshire, England

Coordinates: 53.985°N 0.874°W

HMP Millsike
- Interactive map of HMP Millsike
- Location: Full Sutton, East Riding of Yorkshire, England
- Security class: Adult Male/Category C
- Capacity: 1,500
- Opened: 28 March 2025

HM Prison Millsike, situated in the East Riding of Yorkshire and opened in 2025, was built by Kier and commenced with a 10-year operational contract by Mitie Care & Custody.

== History ==
Construction began in November 2021 by Kier. It was part of the government's New Prisons Programme and followed the construction of Five Wells Prison and HMP Fosse Way in Glen Parva, Leicestershire. The site is opposite HMP Full Sutton.

The prison holds 1,500 prisoners and is the first in the UK to run solely on electricity generated through solar panels and heat pumps, enabling it to use a quarter of the energy of historic prisons such as HMP Wormwood Scrubs.

After a six-week consultation on its name, a panel of Ministry of Justice representatives, as well as local residents created a shortlist for then Deputy Prime Minister, Dominic Raab, who agreed upon a name. On 27 February 2023, then Prisons Minister Damian Hinds announced the name as HM Prison Millsike, after the adjacent river, Millsike Beck.
