= HM Prison Coldingley =

Prison in Bisley, Surrey

Coordinates: 51.3224°N 0.6419°W

HMP Coldingley
- Interactive map of HMP Coldingley
- Location: Bisley, Surrey
- Security class: Adult Male/Category C
- Population: 513 (18 May 2009)
- Opened: 1969
- Managed by: HM Prison Services
- Governor: D Ceglowski
- Website: Coldingley at justice.gov.uk

HM Prison Coldingley is a Category C men's prison, located in the village of Bisley, in Surrey, England. The prison is operated by His Majesty's Prison Service.

== History ==
Coldingley was opened in 1969 as a Category B training prison. The opening was attended by Lord Stonham, Minister of State at the Home Office.

In 1991 Coldingley was hailed as a flagship prison in England. In 1993 Coldingley was re-designated as Category C training prison.

A report published in 2004, by His Majesty's Chief Inspector of Prisons, criticised the prison for its lack of work and training for inmates, and poor prisoner resettlement programmes.

In 2005, the Howard League for Penal Reform set up a graphic design studio in Coldingley which offers prisoners fully remunerated employment at market rates (now closed).

In July 2011, it was announced that along with several other prisons, Coldingley would be put up for market testing, allowing private companies as well as HM Prison service, to bid for a contract to run the prison.

== The prison today ==
Coldingley consists of seven residential wings: Alpha which has an extra location called Foxtrot, Bravo, Charlie, Delta, Echo Wing (built October 2008)and Golf. Wings A-D consist of 87 single cells and 3 doubles, Foxtrot has 5 double cells. Echo Wing has both single and double cells, zone 3 is the ISFL landing, zone 4 houses prisoners who are serving life sentences, IPP status and those who are sentenced to over 10 years. Golf wing has 62 self contained pods, this wing is used for those who have progressed through their sentence and are coming up to open conditions.

E Wing cells have in-cell sanitation and a shower. The other wings all operate on an automated night sanitation system, which can cause problems as inmates get held in queues to use sanitation. Showers facilities are communal.

High wages are not on offer at Coldingley anymore, but inmates can still earn up to £33 a week in the various industries located within the Prison. These industries are: Laundry, Sign Shop, Print Shop and DHL.

The Education department offers numerous courses, such as: Numeracy, literacy, Business Enterprise, Art, IT courses, preparation for work and several others.

A brand new gym was completed and opened to inmates in January 2009. The new equipment has already begun to inspire inmates and Prison officers to improve their fitness & health. The gym contains a variety of cardiovascular and weight training machines. 5 treadmills, 4 ergometers, 4 cross trainers, 2 bikes & 2 recumbent bikes (Life Fitness). Inmates are offered 4 gym sessions every week.

Coldingley has a small library, which has a reasonable selection of books.
