= Agecroft Power Station =

Former coal-fired power station in England

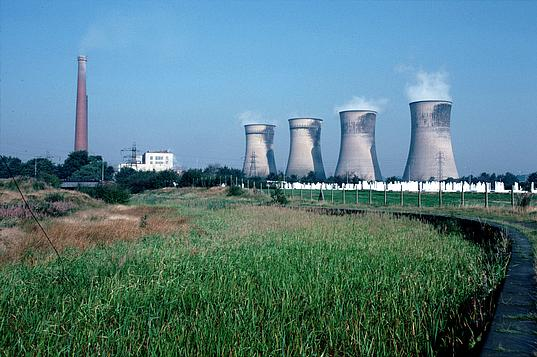
- Agecroft Power Station in September 1985
- Country: United Kingdom
- Location: Greater Manchester, North West England
- Coordinates: 53.515401°N 2.300896°W
- Status: Decommissioned
- Commission date: 1925
- Decommission date: 1993
- Operators: Salford Corporation Electricity Department (1925–1948); British Electricity Authority (1948–1955); Central Electricity Authority (1955–1957); Central Electricity Generating Board (1958–1990); National Power (1990-1993)

Thermal power station
- Primary fuel: Coal

External links
- Commons: Related media on Commons

Agecroft Power Station was a coal-fired power station between the eastern bank of the Manchester, Bolton and Bury Canal and the western bank of the River Irwell at Pendlebury, near Manchester, England. It operated between 1925 and 1993, and was demolished in 1994. HM Prison Forest Bank has since been built on the site.

== History ==
Agecroft Hall, an ancient manor house once occupied a site nearby, between Lumns Lane to the west and the Manchester to Bolton railway line and disused Manchester, Bolton and Bury Canal to the east. It was dismantled by a new owner and shipped to Richmond, Virginia in the USA.

The first power station on the site, Agecroft A Power Station, was formally opened by Alderman G. Billington, the Mayor of Salford, on Wednesday 23 September 1925. It was operated by the Salford Corporation Electricity Department. After nationalisation of the British electricity supply industry in 1948 the station was owned and operated by the British Electricity Authority (1948–1955), then the Central Electricity Authority (1955–1957), finally by the Central Electricity Generating Board (1958–1990).

The station was then extended in 1950 with the construction of a B station and in the 1960s a C station. Agecroft B and C power stations were officially opened in 1962 and the event was commemorated with a plaque.

== Specifications ==
=== A station ===
The A station used three 12,500 and one 20,000 kilowatt (kW) Metropolitan-Vickers turbo generators to give a total generating capacity of 57,500 kW. These were supplied with steam from six Babcock & Wilcox, 65,000 pounds per hour (8.2 kg/s), and two John Thompson, 80,000 lb/hr (10.1 kg/s) boilers. These operated at 325 psi at 720 °F (B&W) and 780 °F (JT). Following the rebuilding of some of the original chain grate coal fired boilers in the A station as oil fired units the needed extra steam capacity required for the 20,000 kW unit was supplied from the B station extra boiler capacity via a steam line several hundred feet in length. The pressure step down valves were located at the B station

This site still features some original buildings, although most of these are stripped. There was a building marked as a "transformer bay" in site plans, which housed a small control room until recently. This building is also referred to as Agecroft A Substation

Cooling water was obtained from the River Irwell.

The generating capacity and electricity output of Agecroft A is given in the table.

Agecroft A electricity capacity and output
Year	1954	1955	1956	1957	1958	1961	1962	1963	1967
Installed capacity, MW	47	47	47	47	47	58.1	58.1	58.1	58.1
Electricity output, GWh	36.495	32.972	19.422	18.042	32.052	14.3	7.314	12.933	27.174

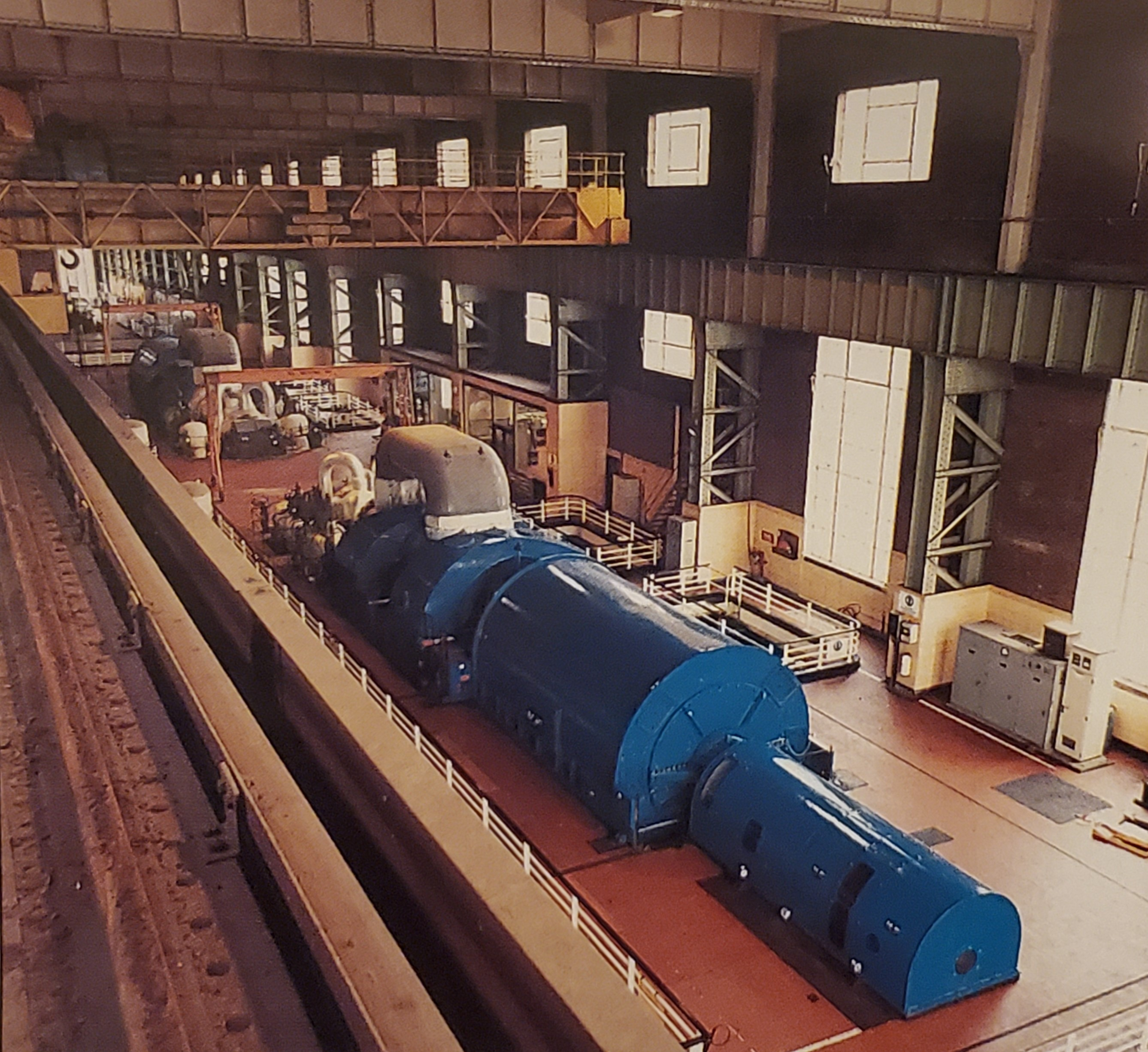
Agecroft Power Station Turbine Hall

=== B and C stations ===
The B station had four International Combustion Limited pulverised coal boilers rated at 35,000 lb/hr, steam conditions were 620 psi and a super-heater temperature of 538 °C with reheat to 538 °C. The B station used two Metropolitan-Vickers 52.5 megawatt (MW) generating sets, the first was commissioned in November 1950. An extension to 345 MW was authorised in July 1955. The B station had two hyperbolic Mouchel concrete cooling towers each rated for 3.08 million gallons per hour. The generating capacity and electricity output of Agecroft B is given in the table.

Agecroft B electricity capacity and output
Year	1954	1955	1956	1957	1958
Installed capacity, MW	100	100	100	100	100
Electricity output, GWh	559.116	656.936	525.917	516.723	593.020

The C Station used two 124 megawatt (MW) Metropolitan-Vickers hydrogen cooled sets giving a total generation capacity of 358 MW across the B and C stations. The turbines were supplied with steam from two 860,000 lb/hr (108.4 kg/s) International Combustion Limited boilers operating at 1500 psi and 1000 °F (103.4 bar and 538 °C). Agecroft C was one of the CEGB's twenty steam power stations with the highest thermal efficiency; in 1963–4 the thermal efficiency was 3.51 per cent, 32.47 per cent in 1964–5, and 32.79 per cent in 1965–6. The electricity output from the C station was as follows:

Electricity output from Agecroft C
Year	1959-60	1960-1	1961-2	1962-3	1963–4	1964–5	1965–6	1966–67	1971–2	1978–9	1981–2
Electricity supplied, GWh	308	1,393	1,775	1,813	1,265	1,322	1,385	1,832	1,163	1,261	1,129
Load factor, %	47	48.5	61.8	62.92	62.1	65.0	68.2	62.3	39.4	42.8	38.3
Thermal efficiency, %	33.17	30.63	31.41	31.47	33.51	32.47	32.79	30.14	29.37	30.49	32.13

== Operations ==
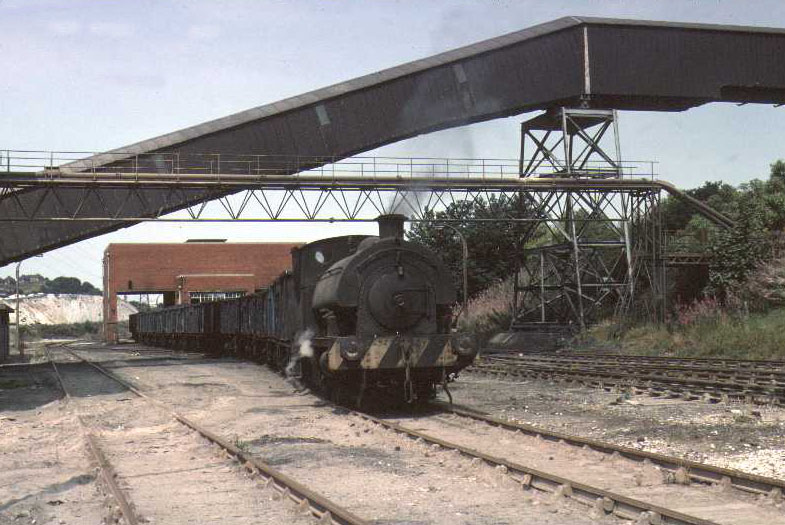
A Robert Stephenson & Hawthorn-built 0-4-0ST pauses while shunting waggons at the power station in 1976.

The stations used cooling water from the River Irwell and the B and C stations were cooled by four large natural draft cooling towers situated close to the banks of the Irwell.

Three steam locomotives were built by Robert Stephenson and Hawthorns in Newcastle upon Tyne in 1948 to shunt coal wagons at the A station and later the B and C stations. However, with the nationalisation of the UK's electric supply industry, the locomotives became almost entirely redundant as a conveyor belt was constructed to carry coal directly across Agecroft Road (A6044) and into the station from Agecroft Colliery. The colliery continued to supply the stations until its closure in March 1991. Despite this however, locomotives were still used to shunt waggons of coal to and from the colliery. The surplus of locomotives were sold in 1980s. After being retired in 1980, Agecroft No. 1 was saved from scrapping by being bought by a private owner. It was purchased by the Museum of Science and Industry in Manchester in a dismantled state in 2008, where it underwent a 3-year restoration costing £120,000. Agecroft No. 2 was bought by the Ribble Steam Railway and sent to Southport for restorations in December 1982. Agecroft No. 3 is going under full restoration at the Whitwell & Reepham railway station in Norfolk.

== Closure and demolition ==
Agecroft Colliery was closed in March 1991 and the closure of the power station was announced in November 1992. The station closed in March 1993, and demolition commenced later that year. The cooling towers and two main stacks were demolished on 8 May 1994. Their demolition was delayed because a pair of rare peregrine falcons had nested on the site. HM Prison Forest Bank has since been built on the station's site. It houses category B male offenders and was opened in January 2000.

Sometime in December 2019 or January 2020, Agecroft A Substation was stripped of its Art Deco control panels. The reason is unknown, perhaps this represents a step towards demolition.

== Cultural use ==
In 1983, the stations were the subject of a photograph by British landscape photographer John Davies.

== See also ==
- Central Electricity Generating Board
- Agecroft Colliery
- Manchester, Bolton and Bury Canal
- River Irwell
