= National Tactical Response Group =

Specialist unit of His Majesty's Prison Service

National Tactical Response Unit
- Active: 1983–present
- Country: England and Wales
- Agency: His Majesty's Prison Service
- Role: Riot control
- Abbreviation: NTRG

Structure
- Sworn members: 44
- Stations: NTRG Hatfield Woodhouse; NDTSG Kidlington

The National Tactical Response Group (NTRG) is a specialist unit of His Majesty's Prison Service (HMPS) in England and Wales, working alongside the National Dog & Technical Support Group (NDTSG). The unit responds to dangerous situations, in particular, prison riots and hostage taking incidents. It has also been deployed to young offender institutions (YOIs) and immigration removal centres (IRCs).

NTRG officers undertake four months of training in riot control tactics including methods of entry, working at height and hostage resolution. They wear flame retardant uniforms, stab-proof vests, helmets and armoured gloves and routinely carry batons, shields, PAVA incapacitant spray, and smoke bombs. The unit operates at two sites, NTRG Hatfield Woodhouse, near HMP Hatfield in South Yorkshire, and NDTSG Kidlington near Campsfield House IRC in Oxford.

Deployments of the NDTSG and NTRG are overseen at a national level, where escalation from localised 'Tornado Teams' is deemed appropriate. The NTRG had 44 total staff in 2017, and a budget of £1.5 million in the 2019–2020 financial year. In 2024, the unit was called out 822 times to prison establishments across England and Wales.
