= HM Prison Wealstun =

Prison in West Yorkshire, England

Coordinates: 53°54′51″N 1°19′52″W

HMP Wealstun
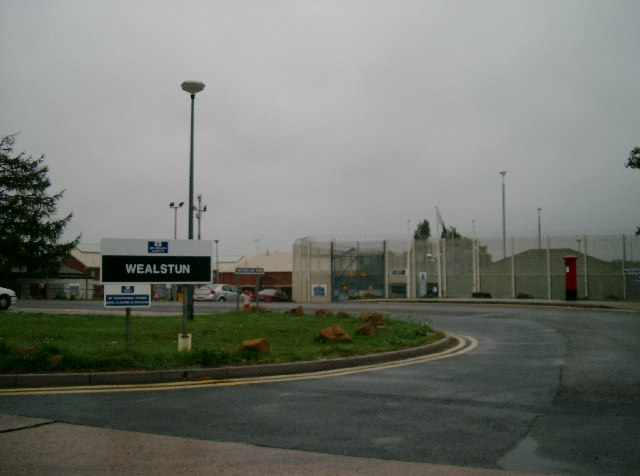
- Interactive map of HMP Wealstun
- Location: Thorp Arch, West Yorkshire
- Security class: Adult Male/Category C&D
- Population: 800 (July 2015)
- Opened: 1995 (1965)
- Managed by: HM Prison Services
- Governor: Charlotte Mann
- Website: Wealstun at justice.gov.uk

HM Prison Wealstun is a Category C men's prison, located near the village of Thorp Arch in West Yorkshire, England. The prison is operated by His Majesty's Prison Service.

== History ==
Wealstun Prison was formed from the amalgamation of HMP Thorp Arch and HMP Rudgate on 1 April 1995; both built in 1965, on the site of ROF Thorp Arch. The amalgamation of two neighbouring establishments was an historic development for the Prison Service, and had the effect of creating a category C closed side and category D open side within one establishment. A great deal of building development has taken place at the prison.

In June 2003, 20 prisoners were involved in a rooftop protest, smashing windows and climbing drainpipes and ledges. After 19 hours some of the prisoners descended, but some of the inmates lasted 30 hours before surrendering peacefully.

In February 2004, a report from Her Majesty's Chief Inspector of Prisons criticised the prison for being mouldy, damp and infested with rats. The report stated that in parts of the prison there was no alarm system, basic repairs had been neglected and windows were smashed or missing and made 135 recommendations. However following a more recent inspection, HMP Wealstun was highly praised for the work undertaken there.

In 2008 due to Category C overcrowding problems in the prison service, the prison was re-rolled from a Category C/D prison to a wholly Category C prison and as a result the open side of the prison closed, and was converted to category C accommodation. The new Category C area commenced operation in April 2010.

In August 2010, an unannounced full inspection of the prison by Her Majesty's Chief Inspector of Prisons stated that Wealstun "is clearly slipping backwards. The deterioration in safety is the most obvious example but there is a disturbing sense of lack of grip in other areas too. The issues identified in this report need to be addressed quickly and effectively to prevent them from becoming even more serious." The report also made numerous recommendations.

== The prison today ==
Accommodation at Wealstun includes 15 double-occupancy cells on B Wing. The remainder of the Category C cells are single-occupancy covering 11 wings (A – K Wing).

Wealstun offers education, workshops, training courses, farms and gardens and a works department. The prison has a Listener Scheme (supported by the Samaritans and prison officers) and a Community Integration Unit and work out scheme. Wealstun is served by Leeds North East Primary Care Trust, with a part-time medical officer and an on-call facility. HMP Wealstun also has extensive services and provisions in place to help with resettlement and reducing reoffending.

Wealstun has a visitors' centre for use on visiting days, and a modern visiting room is in operation, which has play area facilities and a refreshment counter where food may be purchased. There is a non-denominational chapel which was dedicated on 1 November 2005.

HMP Wealstun opened fully as a category C establishment in April 2010 after the security building work was completed on the conversion of the category D part of the prison.

== Notable former inmates ==
- Owen Oyston
