= Offender Assessment System =

OASys is the abbreviated term for the Offender Assessment System, used in England and Wales by His Majesty's Prison and Probation Service to measure the risks and needs of criminal offenders under their supervision.

OASys was developed through pilot studies conducted between 1999 and 2001. The National Probation Service--as it was then called--began implementing it in paper form circa 2002. An electronic version was first deployed at HMP Preston in April 2003, followed by a national prison rollout beginning in June 2003.

Full electronic implementation across all 42 probation areas was claimed to have been achieved by June 2004.

OASys is designed to enable a properly trained and qualified individual, often a Probation Officer, to:

- assess how likely an offender is to be re-convicted
- identify and classify offending-related needs, including basic personality characteristics and cognitive behavioural problems
- assess and manage the Risk of Serious Harm to others
- assist with management of identified risks of harm to the individual
- links the assessment to the supervision or sentence plan
- indicate the need for further specialist assessments, such as course work
- measure change during the period of supervision / sentence.

OASys comprises a series of computer-based, drop down boxes, in which clinical evaluations are made by staff, and supervision and sentence plans for the forthcoming period of supervision are drawn up and reviewed on a periodic basis - ideally every 16 weeks at a minimum, though this can vary for one or more of several reasons, including: to ready the prisoner for an upcoming parole review, upon transfer from one prison to another, and just before the individual in the community is released from court-ordered supervision.

Works?
