= HM Prison Holme House =

Prison in Stockton-on-Tees, County Durham, England

Coordinates: 54.5779°N 1.2931°W

HMP Holme House
- Interactive map of HMP Holme House
- Location: Holme House Road, Stockton-on-Tees, County Durham, TS18 2QU, United Kingdom
- Security class: Adult Male/Category B Training & Resettlement Prison
- Capacity: 1211
- Population: 1211
- Opened: 1992
- Managed by: HM Prison and Probation Service
- Governor: Aled Edwards
- Website: http://www.justice.gov.uk/contacts/prison-finder/holme-house

His Majesty's Prison Holme House is a Category B men's prison, located in Stockton-on-Tees, County Durham, England. The prison is operated by His Majesty's Prison & Probation Service.

== History ==
A purpose built prison, Holme House opened in May 1992, and was expanded to include further houseblocks and workshops in the late 1990s.

In July 2002, Holme House suffered a three-day prison riot. The prisoners turned violent after being locked up for longer periods due to staff shortages. Various fixtures and fittings were destroyed during the incident.

Another major disturbance followed a year later, when rioting prisoners threw pool balls at prison officers.

An incident in September 2014 resulted in one inmate being taken to hospital. Mike Quinn, vice-chairman of the National Association of Probation Officers Northumbria branch, said that the event was a consequence of staff cuts in the prison service. A spokesman for the Ministry of Justice stated that this had been an isolated incident unrelated to staffing levels.

In 2017 the prison was re-rolled from a Category B local/remand prison to a Category C training and resettlement. This coincided with being chosen as a pilot site for a joint Department of Health and Ministry of Justice programme to develop better ways to promote recovery from drug addiction (Drug Recovery Prison Programme).

In early 2025 the prison was changed from a Category C to Category B remand prison.

== The prison today ==
A Category B Reform and Remand prison, Holme House takes adult male prisoners, and some sentenced young offenders. Accommodation at Holme House comprises seven self-contained residential communities. One house block is a drugs therapeutic community (69 places) and another block is for vulnerable prisoners. A mixture of single and double cells with integral sanitation and communal showering facilities.

Holme House has a workshop complex and an Education Department who both provide inmates with employment and education classes. Work/training areas include laundry, woodwork, furniture assembly, textiles, Print Workshop production, industrial cleaning, Painting and Decorating, electrical testing and picture framing. Many areas of training can lead to NVQ qualifications in related fields.

There is a Visitors Centre located outside of Holme House Prison, which has a children's play area, disabled access toilets, a refreshment bar and a baby changing facility.
