= HM Prison Dovegate =

Prison in Staffordshire, England

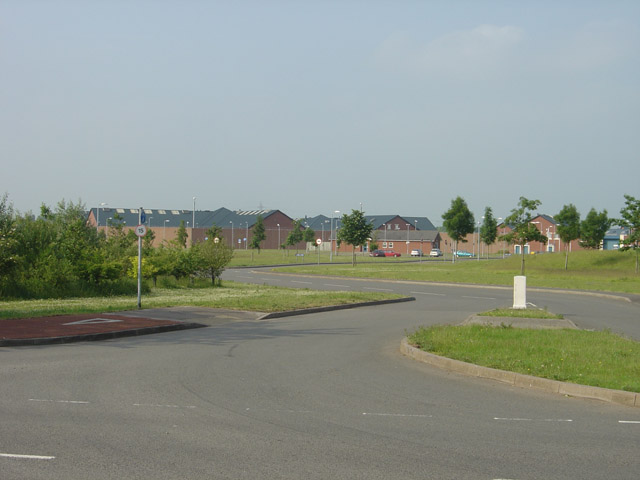
- Interactive map of HM Prison Dovegate
- Location: Uttoxeter, Staffordshire; 52.8713°N 1.7809°W
- Status: Operational
- Security class: Category B
- Capacity: 1,160 (September 2009)
- Opened: 2001
- Managed by: Serco
- Director: Andy Johnson
- Website: www.serco.com/uk/sector-expertise/justice/hmp-dovegate

His Majesty's Prison Dovegate is a Category B men's private prison near Uttoxeter in Staffordshire, England, operated by Serco.

== History ==
Her (now His) Majesty's Prison Dovegate opened in 2001 as a private prison, operated by the Serco Group under a 25-year Design, build and manage, PFI contract.

In 2009 with the creation of an additional accommodation block, and the expansion of other facilities, the prison increased its capacity to 860 places in the main prison, with 200 places in the Therapeutic prison.

== Regime and facilities ==
Dovegate receives Category B convicted prisoners serving four years and over with at least 18 months left to serve. Accommodation at the prison is divided into the main prison (860 places) and the Therapeutic Prison (200 places). In 2009 the addition of a further accommodation block and other facilities, saw the original capacity increase, and the prison now has 130 remand places, taking remand prisoners from Stoke and Newcastle-under-Lyme courts.

The education department of the jail has space for 126 prisoners to receive part-time education in classes operating 5 days a week. Activities range from basic skills to Open University courses. Other facilities include a library, shop, gym and sports centre. Dovegate has 24-hour primary healthcare facility, with a full-time medical officer.

Chaplaincy services include a full-time Church of England chaplain and a full-time Islamic minister, part-time Methodist and Roman Catholic ministers, as well as visiting Jewish, Buddhist, Sikh and Jehovah's Witness ministers. There is a dedicated place of worship with Christian and multi-faith areas.

There is a staffed visitor's centre. The main visiting area has both indoor and outdoor children's play areas. It also has a bus stop directly outside the gates with Services every 2 hours to Uttoxeter and Burton on Trent.

HM Inspectorate of Prisons published reports on Dovegate from 2003 to 2011.
