= HM Prison Addiewell =

Prison in West Lothian, Scotland

HMP Addiewell
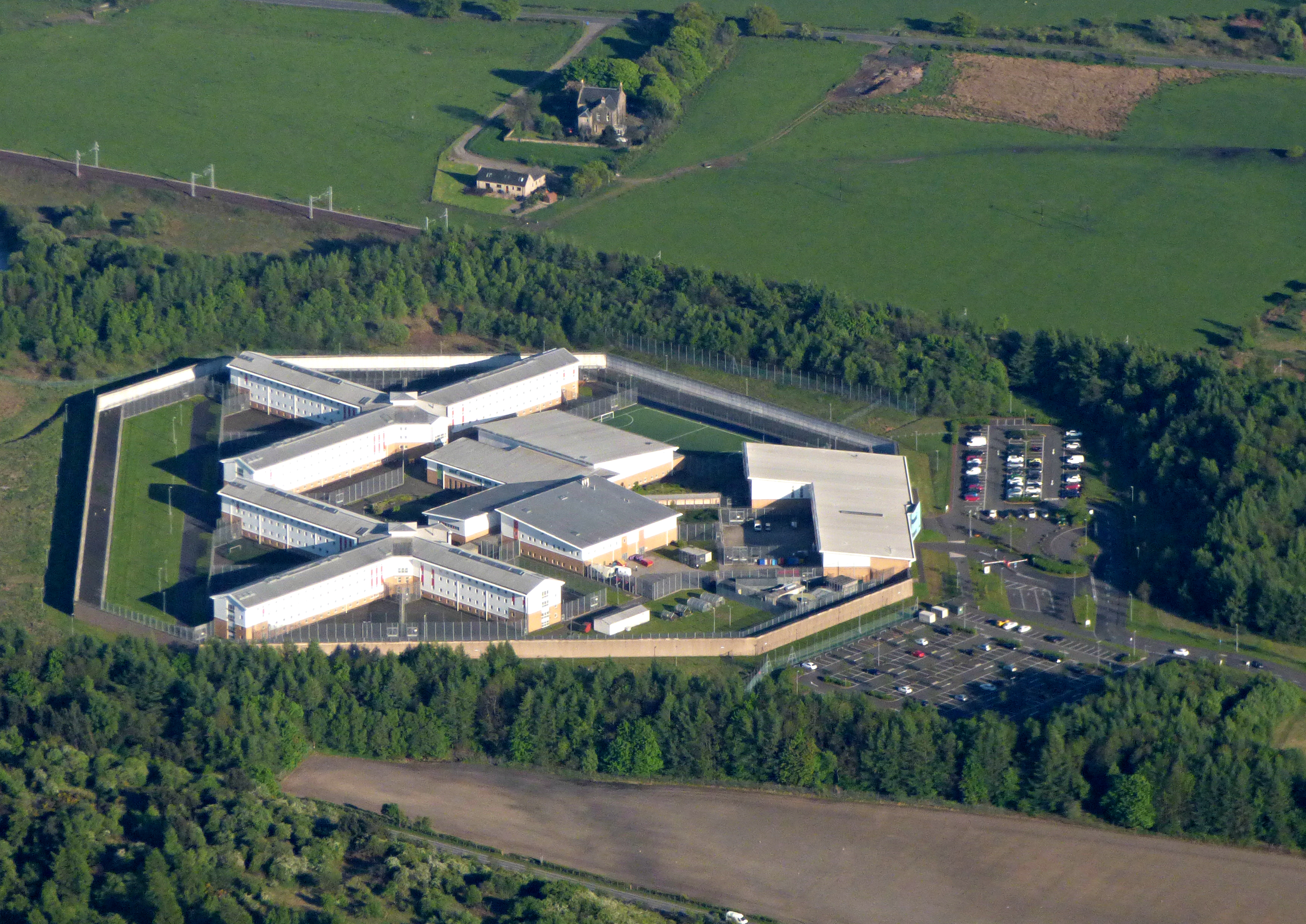
- Interactive map of HMP Addiewell
- Location: Addiewell, West Lothian, Scotland; 55.8468°N 3.5993°W
- Status: Operational
- Security class: Adult Male Maximum Security (Cat A)
- Capacity: 796 (March 2020)
- Opened: December 2008
- Managed by: Sodexo Justice Services
- Governor: Jonathan French

HMP Addiewell is a private prison near the village of Addiewell in West Lothian, Scotland. HMP Addiewell is operated by Sodexo Justice Services and contracted to the Scottish Prison Service. The prison holds adult males who have been convicted as well as those being held on remand

== Opening ==
In January 2004, a six-week public consultation began for a planning application for a new £80 million prison in West Lothian. In June 2006, the contract was awarded to a consortium of companies that included Sodexo Investment Services and the Royal Bank Project Investments. The prison opened on 12 December 2008 with capacity for 700 prisoners, with a further 96 places held in reserve.

== History of operation ==
- In February 2009, a cell was damaged by fire in an incident that lasted 3 hours.
- In October 2009 there was a disturbance involving around 20 inmates which led to a prison custody officer requiring hospital treatment.
- Two prison custody officers were injured during a riot in January 2010.
- In November 2010 the prison was running at capacity, with 700 prisoners being held.
- In March 2011 HM Chief Inspector of Prisons expressed concerns about the level of assaults on staff.

== Notable inmates ==
- Nat Fraser, murdered his wife Arlene Fraser in 1998
- Anthony Stokes, Irish footballer and convicted stalker
