= HM Prison Forest Bank =

Private prison in Salford, England

Coordinates: 53°30′53″N 2°18′07″W

Forest Bank Prison
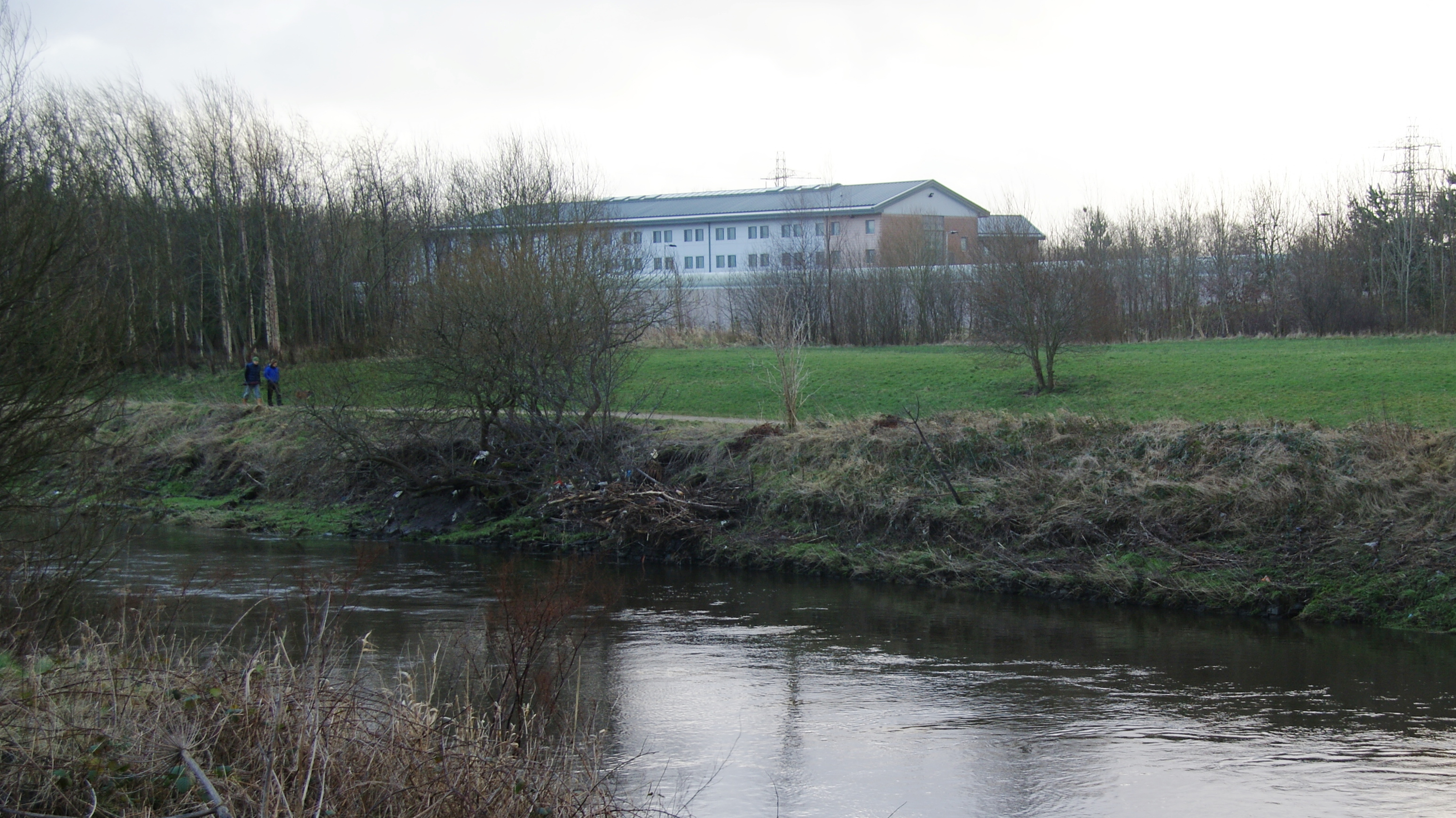
- Interactive map of Forest Bank Prison
- Location: Swinton, Salford
- Status: Operational
- Security class: Adult Male/Category B
- Capacity: 1,460 (May 2015)
- Opened: January 2000
- Former name: HMP Forest Bank
- Managed by: Sodexo Justice Services
- Director: Trevor Short
- Website: https://www.hmpforestbank.co.uk/home.html

Forest Bank Prison is a Category B men's private prison, in the Agecroft area of Pendlebury in Salford, England. The prison is currently operated by Sodexo Justice Services.

== History ==
=== Ownership ===
Forest Bank Prison was constructed on the site of the former Agecroft Power Station. The 25-year design, construct, manage and finance contract was won by Kalyx (formerly UKDS) in 1997 and it opened in January 2000.

In 2011, three former members of staff successfully sued Kalyx for unfair dismissal, and their treatment by the serving deputy director of the prison. Also in 2011, Kalyx changed their name for the second time, becoming known as Sodexo Justice Services.

=== Reports ===
In November 2002, A report from His Majesty's Chief Inspector of Prisons praised the prison for its staff-prisoner relations, management structure, increased staffing levels and levels of association between inmates. However, the report also noted that many of the staff lacked experience and that there was insufficient purposeful activity, with fewer than half the prisoners engaged in meaningful work or education.

In December 2005, the prison was severely criticised by the Chief Inspector of Prisons for high levels of violence and drug taking amongst inmates. The inspection found that, in one month alone, more than 2 kg of cannabis, 60 g of heroin, and 4.6 g of cocaine were found, and 40 per cent of compulsory drug tests were positive. The report also found a significant deterioration in safety for staff and inmates with routine intimidation of staff, prisoner assaults on other prisoners running at 25 a month, and staff turnover of 25 per cent a year. There had also been 2,500 prisoner discipline hearings in six months.

In November 2010, HM Chief Inspector of Prisons, Nick Hardwick noted in his report on the prison that some young inmates had been tied up in their bed linen and beaten by other prisoners. The report also acknowledged that in other matters there were many signs of improvement.

A 2013 report from the Chief Inspector of Prisons noted that there was a need for more work, education and training to be made available, with "over 40% of prisoners ... locked up doing nothing during the working day". Since inspection in 2010, there had been "some deterioration in the quality of activity, and learning and skills provided".

=== Escapes and other offences ===
In 2004, it emerged that a prison officer had been caught trying to sell heroin to inmates. The officer was caught with 147 wraps of the drug hidden in his shoes when he started his shift. The officer was jailed for the offence.

In March 2005, an inmate escaped while being taken to hospital in a taxi. The prisoner was handcuffed to two prison officers as they travelled from the prison to the nearby Hope Hospital, when the taxi was stopped by two men who threatened the guards with a gun, forcing them to let the inmate free.

In February 2006, another inmate escaped while visiting hospital. The prisoner managed to escape from two prison guards, and fled from the Manchester Royal Infirmary wearing only a surgical gown.

In May 2010, another inmate, Michael O'Donnell, escaped. The inmate cut off a section of his own ear in order to gain release from the facility in an ambulance, albeit with three prison guards in attendance. The ambulance was stopped on Agecroft Road (A6044) by a gang of armed men, who released O'Donnell and made off. O'Donnell was recaptured on 28 May 2010. He was sentenced to 9½ years on 29 May 2010, and was sent to HMP Strangeways. He was found hanged in his cell on Wednesday 23 June 2010. On 10 February 2011, former Forest Bank Prison Nurse Leanne Cartledge, 23, was sentenced to four months in prison for taking a mobile phone into the prison to give to O'Donnell, with whom she was in a relationship, and which he used to help his escape.

On 29 January 2017, a prisoner was found in his cell after a suspected drug overdose. The inmate is believed to have taken the potent synthetic drug spice. He died the following day.

=== Chris Brown fans ===
In May 2025, it was reported that a number of fans of the US singer Chris Brown had applied for jobs as custody officers at the prison in the belief he was being held on remand there after he was arrested and charged with GBH. Brown was arrested at a hotel in Manchester on 15 May, and appeared before the city's magistrates' court, and was remanded to Forest Bank. Fans also wanted to write to Brown, and even visit him in prison.

== Current role and facilities ==
Forest Bank Prison is a Category B local prison although the majority of the inmates are Category C. The term local means that the prison holds people on remand to the local courts as well as sentenced prisoners. Adult inmates at Forest Bank come from the courts in Bolton, Bury, Leigh and Wigan. Young offenders come from courts in High Peak, Manchester, Oldham, Rochdale, Stockport, Tameside and Trafford.

The prison is divided into eight wings (A-H), a healthcare unit and a care and separation unit. Accommodation at the prison consists mostly of double cells, with some single cells. All of the cells are designed to be safer than previous prison designs, having almost no ligature points due to modularisation being the method of construction.

The healthcare unit at Forest Bank has a 20-bed in-patient facility, with a 24-hour nursing care service. There is also a full-time Senior Medical Officer and a Locum Medical Officer at the prison.

Activities at the prison include production workshops, training workshops and vocational training courses in motor mechanics, industrial cleaning, catering and welding. There is a Visits Hall, with facilities including a WRVS-run canteen, and a play area for children aged 2–12 years.

== Notable inmates ==
- Peter Morrison, former footballer turned agent who was jailed for causing death by dangerous driving.
