= HM Prison Altcourse =

Men's prison and young offender institution in Liverpool

Coordinates: 53°27′43″N 2°56′08″W

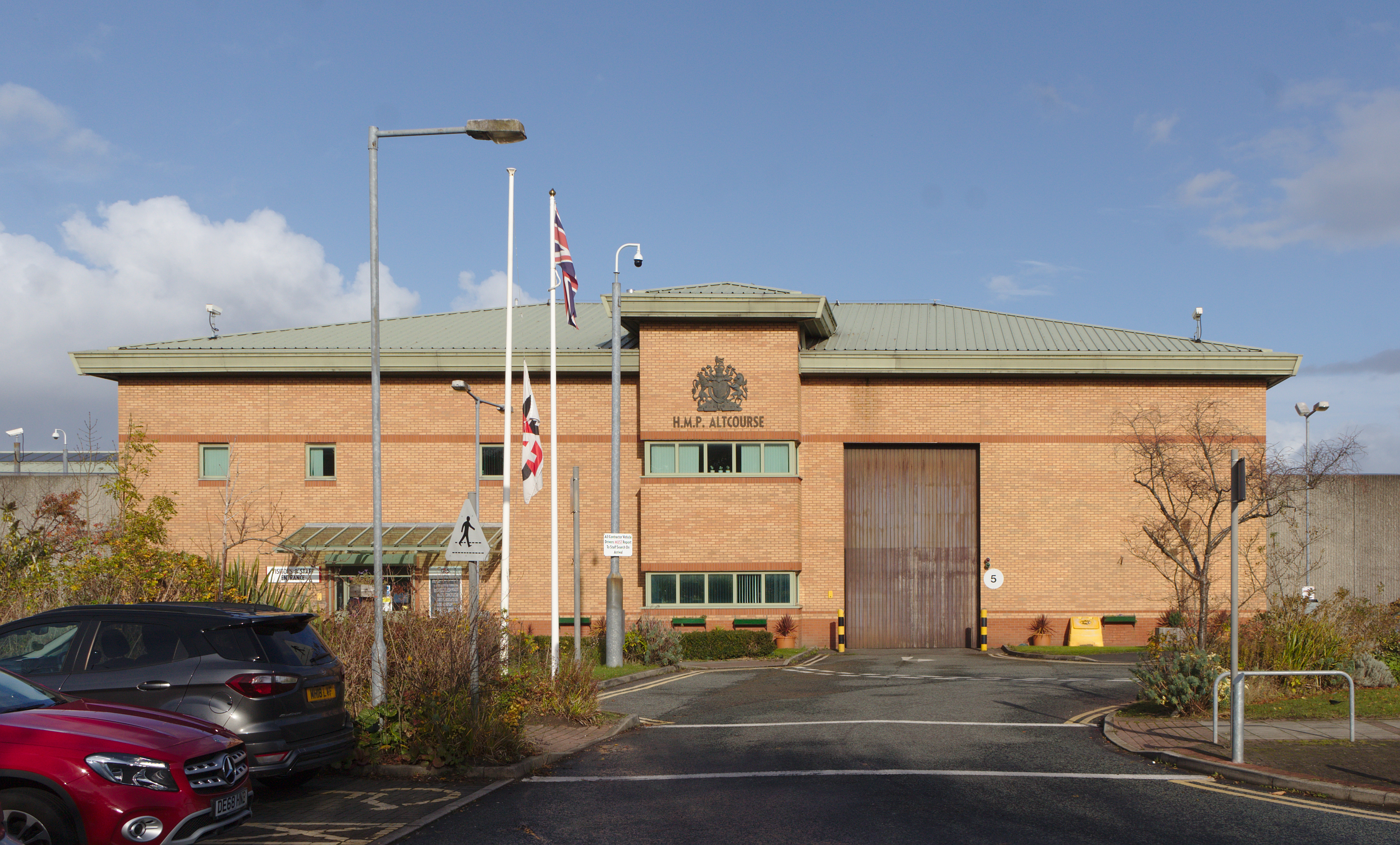
- Interactive map of HM Prison Altcourse
- Location: Liverpool, Merseyside
- Status: Operational
- Security class: Category A/B Adult Male & Young Offenders Institution
- Capacity: 1,164 (March 2022)
- Opened: 1997
- Managed by: Sodexo
- Director: Steve Williams

HM Prison Altcourse is a Category B men's private prison and Young Offender Institution in the Fazakerley area of Liverpool in Merseyside, England. The prison is operated by Sodexo, which took over from G4S in 2023.

== History ==
Altcourse became the first prison to be procured under a Private Finance Initiative contract when the contract was signed in December 1995. It was built by Tarmac Construction and opened in December 1997. While early reports about the management of the prison were favourable, the financing of the project drew criticism after it emerged in 2002 that G4S, which oversaw construction and operated the prison, had made a £10 million windfall from the contracts.

In 2005 it was reported that Altcourse was the most overcrowded prison in England with 1,324 inmates.

In November 2009, the prison's own Independent Monitoring Board published a report which criticised the amount of illegal drugs that were being smuggled into Altcourse. The report suggested that mobile phones (which were also being smuggled into the jail) were helping to fuel the trade. A month later, it emerged that inmates at Altcourse were being given access to satellite television as a reward for good behaviour.

== The prison wings ==
Altcourse is separated into two main halves by facility buildings such as the segregation block, gymnasium, library, religious hall, education centre, and the first night centre. There are 7 main wings on the site, all named after fences of the Grand National steeplechase course.

== Notable inmates ==
Notable inmates include:

- Mike Amesbury, MP for Runcorn and Helsby, was sentenced to 10 weeks in prison for assaulting a man in October 2024
- Benjamin Mendy, French international footballer playing for Manchester City, held on remand whilst awaiting trial accused of four counts of rape and one count of sexual assault at his home in Cheshire.
- Thomas Waring, the man who assisted Connor Chapman, gunman from the Christmas Eve 2022 Wallasey pub shooting, by helping him dispose of a stolen car used during the shooting.
