= HM Prison Peterborough =

Prison in Cambridgeshire, England

Coordinates: 52°35′11″N 0°15′36″W

HMP Peterborough
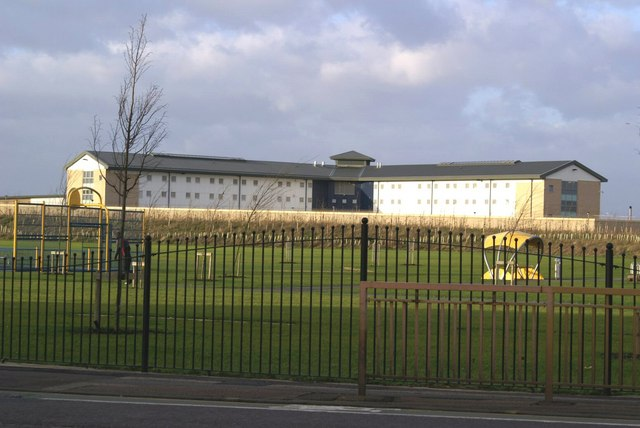
- Interactive map of HMP Peterborough
- Location: Peterborough, Cambridgeshire
- Security class: Category B/Adults & Young Offenders (Local / Remand)
- Capacity: 840 (August 2008)
- Opened: 2005
- Managed by: Sodexo Justice Services
- Director: Ralph Lubkowski

HM Prison Peterborough is a Category B private prison for men, and a closed prison for women and female young offenders, located in Peterborough, Cambridgeshire, England. The prison is operated by Sodexo Justice Services, and is the only dual purpose-built prison holding males and females in the United Kingdom. The prison, which has a population of around 1,100 inmates, comprises 5 large house blocks (10 wings in total) on both the male and female side. It is managed by the Newton Secure Training Centre (NSTC), and the associated training centre, which operates under Sodexo Services.

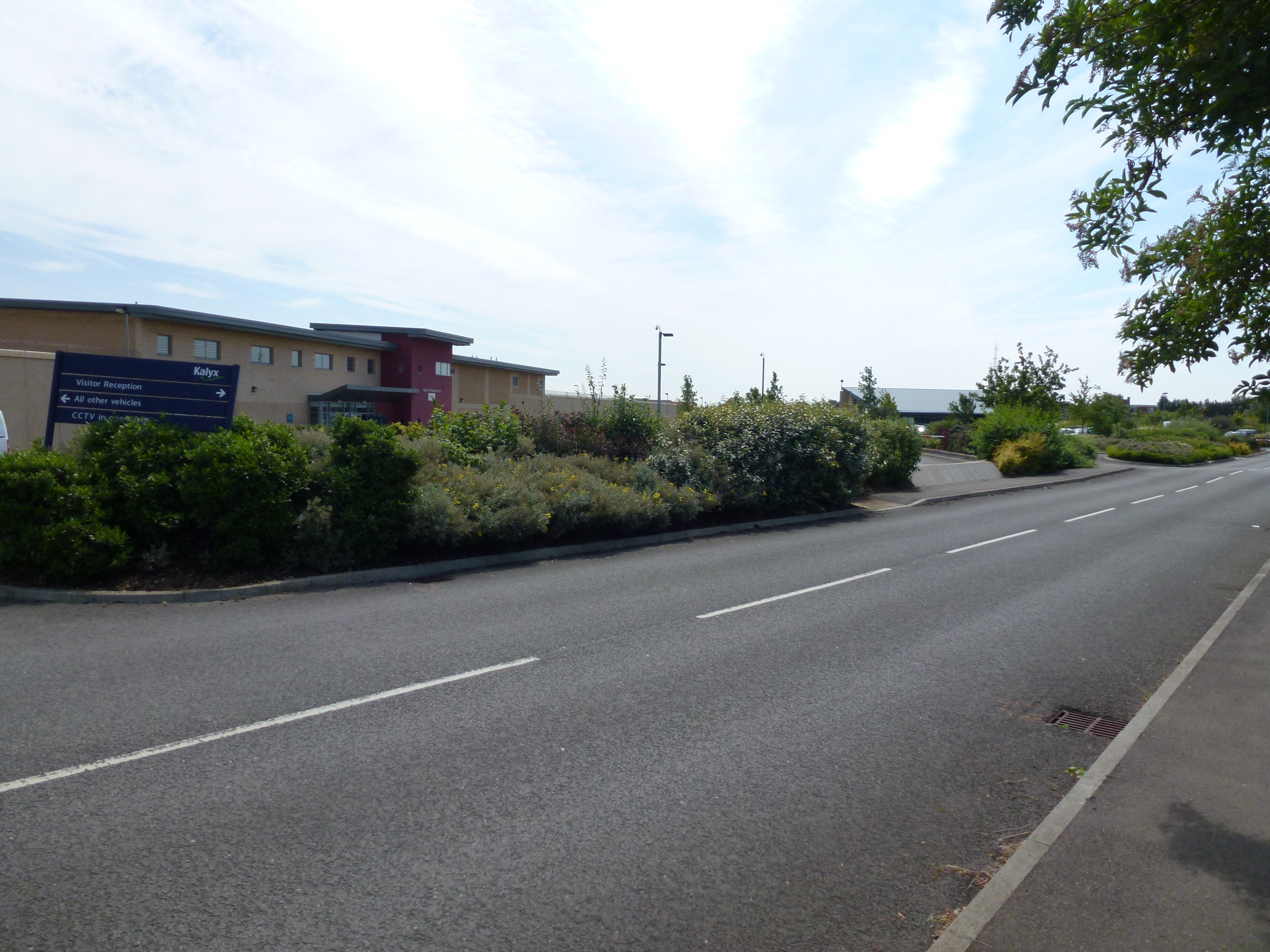
Entrance to HMP Peterborough

== History ==
HMP Peterborough was built on the site of the former Baker Perkins engineering works. It opened in 2005, despite protests from local residents. The Prison Service stated that Peterborough, as a 'mixed-use' prison, would become a blueprint for future prisons. The prison was involved in controversy when it advertised for two holistic therapists to offer inmates reflexology, aromatherapy and Indian head massages. The MP for Peterborough, Stewart Jackson accused the prison of pampering inmates and sending out the wrong message to hard-working families.

In January 2008, a national table of prisons compiled by the Prison Service revealed that the prison had performed worst out of 132 prisons and prison clusters, with low marks for reducing re-offending, organisational effectiveness and decency. A month later, women prisoners complained that the food served at the jail was too high in calories, and made them put on weight. Officials at the prison claimed that healthy options were always available.

In January 2013, the Ministry of Justice announced that an additional houseblock will be constructed at the prison, increasing its capacity.

On 13 April 2018, a Royal Air Force bomb disposal team deployed a bomb disposal robot to interact with a silver Volkswagen Golf at the prison. Authorities later stated they had been responding to a reported bomb but it proved to be a hoax.

== Notable inmates ==
=== Male ===
- Dennis McGrory, double jeopardy rapist and murderer.
- Nicholas Prosper, shot dead his mother, brother and sister and planned to commit a mass shooting at a school.

=== Female ===
- Mahek Bukhari, social media influencer convicted of a double murder of her mother's lover and friend. Sentenced in 2023.
- Lucy Connolly, woman jailed for race hate post in the aftermath of the 2024 Southport attack, released since.
- Rekha Kumari-Baker, woman who stabbed to death her own two children in 2007
- Lucy Letby, neonatal nurse who murdered numerous babies that were in her care
- Virginia McCullough, woman who killed her parents in 2019 and continued to live in the family home for four years; sentenced to life imprisonment with a minimum term of 36 years in 2024.
- Chelsea O'Mahoney, part of a group of youths convicted of the "happy slapping" homophobic killing of David Morley in 2005
- Emma Tustin, woman convicted of torturing and murdering her step-son in June 2020. Sentenced in 2021.
