= Acklington =

Village in Northumberland, England

Coordinates: 55.311°N 1.640°W

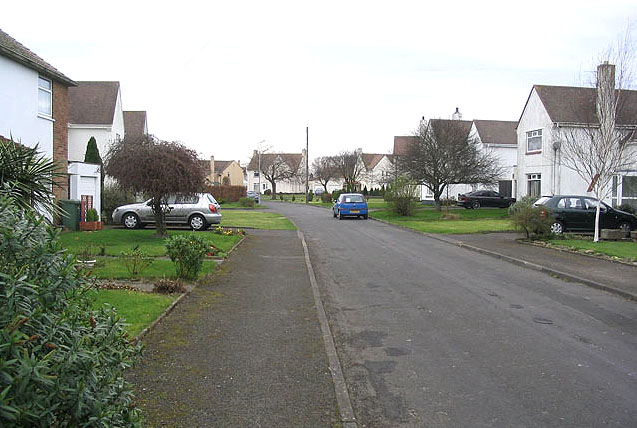
- Acklington

- Location within Northumberland
- Population: 544 (2011)
- OS grid reference: NU229019
- Civil parish: Acklington
- Unitary authority: Northumberland
- Ceremonial county: Northumberland
- Region: North East
- Country: England
- Sovereign state: United Kingdom
- Post town: MORPETH
- Postcode district: NE65
- Dialling code: 01670
- Police: Northumbria
- Fire: Northumberland
- Ambulance: North East
- UK Parliament: North Northumberland

Acklington is a small village in Northumberland, England. It is situated to the south-west of Amble, inland from the North Sea coast. It is served by Acklington railway station. The name is Anglo-Saxon Old English meaning 'farmstead of Eadlac's people'.

Acklington won the title of Northumberland Village of the Year in 2007. It has a parish church, St John the Divine, and a Church of England primary school.

To the north of Acklington is Morwick Hall, a Grade II listed Georgian house. It was built by the Grey family of Howick; in the 1850s it was owned by William Linskill, a former High Sheriff of Northumberland.

A World War II FW3/22 pillbox is located near the B6345.

A dam was constructed on the River Coquet in 1776, causing problems for the river's salmon population. Many years later, the eccentric naturalist Frank Buckland erected a sign directing the salmon to another stream.

== Acklington Air Station ==
RAF Acklington was an airfield close to the coast which opened during World War II. It was also used as the base for an Armament Practice Camp with the aircraft operating over Druridge Bay. After the war it became a training base. The RAF station closed in 1976.

The airfield site is now the home of two prisons: HMP Acklington houses adults, while HMPYOI Castington houses young offenders.

== Climate ==
Climate data for Ashington
Month	Jan	Feb	Mar	Apr	May	Jun	Jul	Aug	Sep	Oct	Nov	Dec	Year
Mean daily maximum °C (°F)	6 (43)	7 (44)	8 (47)	10 (50)	12 (54)	16 (60)	18 (64)	18 (64)	16 (61)	13 (55)	9 (48)	7 (44)	12 (53)
Mean daily minimum °C (°F)	3 (37)	3 (37)	3 (38)	5 (41)	7 (45)	10 (50)	12 (54)	12 (54)	11 (51)	8 (46)	5 (41)	3 (38)	7 (44)
Average precipitation mm (inches)	61 (2.4)	43 (1.7)	41 (1.6)	43 (1.7)	53 (2.1)	46 (1.8)	79 (3.1)	79 (3.1)	58 (2.3)	64 (2.5)	66 (2.6)	58 (2.3)	690 (27.2)
Source: Weatherbase

== Transport ==
Railway

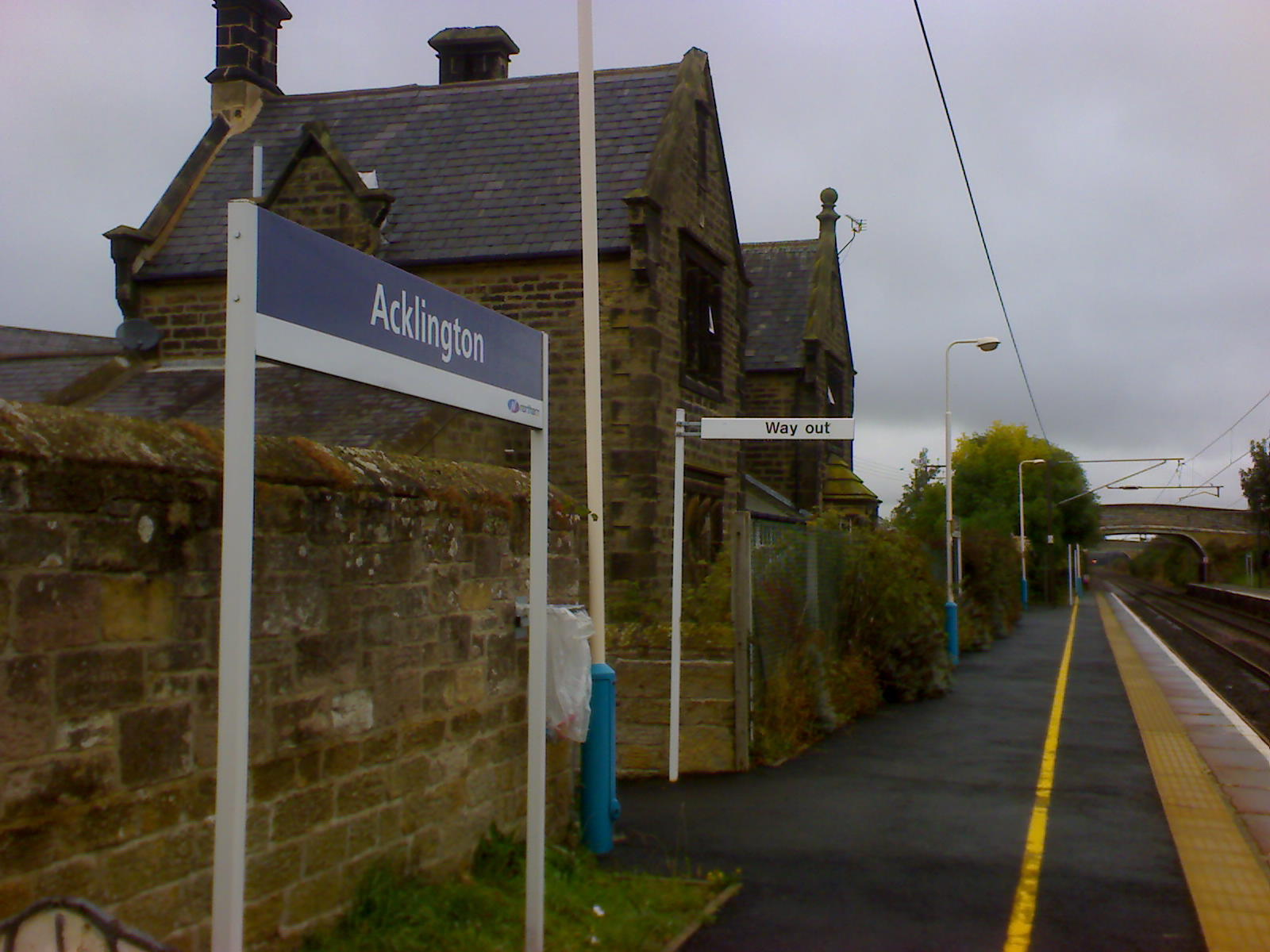
Acklington Railway Station

Acklington is served by Acklington railway station which is located on the East Coast Main Line, although in the 2025 timetable the only trains calling at Acklington were one (evening) northbound and two (morning and evening) southbound local services operated on Mondays to Saturdays by Northern.

The line was opened by the York, Newcastle and Berwick Railway, then joining the North Eastern Railway, it became part of the London and North Eastern Railway during the Grouping of 1923. The line then passed on to the Eastern Region of British Railways on nationalisation in 1948.
