= Five Wells Prison =

Prison in Wellingborough, England

Coordinates: 52.285°N 0.692°W

- Interactive map of Five Wells Prison
- Location: Wellingborough, Northamptonshire, England
- Status: Operational
- Security class: Adult Male/Category C
- Capacity: 1,687
- Population: 1,650 (12 January 2024)
- Opened: 4 March 2022
- Former name: HMP Five Wells
- Managed by: G4S
- Director: Pete Small
- Website: https://www.hmpfivewells.co.uk/

Five Wells Prison, also referred to as Wellingborough Prison, due to it being built on same site as the latter, is a Category C Adult Male prison, located in Wellingborough, Northamptonshire, England. With a maximum capacity of 1,687, it is the largest prison in the East Midlands, and one of the largest in the UK. The prison is operated by G4S.

== History ==
=== Construction ===
It was announced in June 2018 that a new Category C prison would be built in Wellingborough on the site of the now demolished HM Prison Wellingborough, which was closed in 2012. In 2020, it was announced the prison would be called "Five Wells", as voted for by Wellingborough residents. The nine buildings of the prison took 45 weeks to build and were completed in late 2020, costing £253m.

==== Protests ====
Protesters gathered outside of Five Wells Prison in April, 2021.

There were a series of protests about the construction of the prison, including graffiti around Wellingborough town, and most notably a protest in April 2021 outside the prison in which people concreted their arms together, preventing construction vehicles and deliveries entering the prison. This resulted in five arrests due to protesters allegedly becoming hostile to staff and police. The protest was targeted towards the prison's constructor, Kier Group.

=== Operation ===
The first inmates arrived at the prison in early 2022.

In January 2023, videos were released online of inmates smoking cannabis and taking shots of alcoholic drinks including different varieties of vodka and rum held in inconspicuous bottles, most notably a Robinsons juice bottle. This perpetuated the criticism of the prison, as well as of G4S.

In April 2024 it was reported that the first government inspection found that illegal drugs are widely available and inmates are not suitably supported by staff. A survey showed that just over half of inmates said it was "easy" to get hold of illegal drugs, against an average of one third in similar prisons. In addition 1,256 incidents of inmate self-harm were reported in 12 months.
