= Sodexo Justice Services =

Private prison operator in the United Kingdom and several other countries

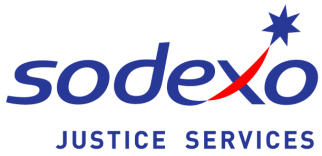
- Industry: Prison Service
- Founded: 1993
- Founder: Pierre Bellon
- Parent: Sodexo

Sodexo Justice Services (formerly United Kingdom Detention Services and Kalyx), a subsidiary of Sodexo, is a private prison operator in the United Kingdom and several other countries. The company changed its name to Sodexo Justice Services in 2011.

As of 2023, the company fully operates six prisons in the United Kingdom. It served 84 prisons in other countries with non-management services, including maintenance, food services, laundry, prisoner education and work training, gardening, and transportation. Of these prisons, 34 were in France, 33 were in the Netherlands, and six or fewer were in each of Australia, Belgium, Chile, Sweden, Slovenia, Italy, and Germany.

In the United Kingdom, Sodexo Justice Services provides services to the Ministry of Justice: particularly design, construction, management and financing of contracts for PFI prisons. In December 2008, it opened a new prison in West Lothian on behalf of the Scottish Prison Service.

== Deaths and abuse allegations ==
In August 2013, Sodexo Justice Services was criticised in an official report for subjecting a female prisoner to "cruel, inhumane and degrading treatment", which "appears to amount to torture" at HMP Bronzefield in Ashford, Surrey, England. The woman was kept segregated from other prisoners in an "unkempt and squalid" prison cell for more than five years.

In October 2016, a video of naked Sodexo prisoners pretending to be dogs was found, prompting an investigation into the violence and humiliation by Sodexo.

In September 2017, Annabella Landsberg died in the care of HMP Peterborough, a Sodexo managed prison. After two weeks of evidence, the inquest jury found "failings on the part of the prison, healthcare staff, GPs and custody officers that contributed to the death of Annabella Landsberg".

On 13 February 2017, the Sodexo managed prison HMP Northumberland was featured in the BBC's Panorama programme, highlighting serious mismanagement issues related to widespread illegal substance abuse.

Soon after, the Sodexo managed prison HMP Forest Bank was alleged to be having a 'spice' epidemic in an article in the Manchester Evening News: "The devastated sister of a prisoner found dead in his cell says inmates are being regularly carried out of their cells high on Spice".

In December 2018, Sodexo was accused of neglect and systemic failures resulting in the death of female prisoner Natasha Chin. Members of the charity INQUEST have pointed to previous neglect-related deaths at the same prison and have suggested that no decisive actions have been taken to act in prevention of additional future deaths.

In February 2019, Sodexo was criticised by the United Kingdom's Ministry of Justice for failing to prevent repeated and systemic breaches of the human rights of inmates at the Sodexo-operated HMP Peterborough. This stemmed from a series of illegal strip-searches of prisoners at the jail in 2017, including one inmate who was menstruating and another who was transitioning from female to male. Justice Julian Knowles described the illegal procedures as "humiliating and embarrassing".

In October 2019, a woman gave birth alone in her cell at HMP Bronzefield. The baby died at the prison. Surrey police said in a statement: "The death is currently being treated as unexplained and an investigation is continuing to establish the full circumstances of what happened". The case raised serious questions about how the woman came to be unsupervised and without medical support during her labour and birth, and about the conditions at the privately run prison. Four women have died at Bronzefield since July 2016.

== Prisons managed ==
Name	Location	Opened	Capacity	Security class
HMP Bronzefield	Surrey	2004	527	Adult Female/Juvenile
HMP Forest Bank	City of Salford	2000	1460	Adult Male/Category B
HMP Peterborough	Peterborough	2005	840 (480 male, 360 female)	Category B/Adults and Young Offenders
HMP Addiewell	West Lothian, Scotland	2008	700 to 800 depending on contract	Adult Male Maximum Security
HMP Northumberland	Northumberland, England	2011 (managed by Sodexo since 2013)	1348	Adult Male/Category C
HMP Altcourse	Liverpool, England	(managed by Sodexo since 1 June 2023)	1164	Adult Male/Category B
