= Prisoner security categories in the United Kingdom =

Classification system for prisoners

In the United Kingdom, prisoners are divided into four categories of security. Each adult is assigned to a category according to their crime, sentence, the risk of escape, and violent tendencies. The categories are designated with the letters A to D, with A being the highest level of security, and D the lowest.

There are three different prison services in the United Kingdom, and separate services for the three Crown Dependencies, i.e., the Channel Islands jointly and the Isle of Man. His Majesty's Prison Service manages prisons in England and Wales, and also serves as the National Offender Management Service for England and Wales. Prisons in Scotland are managed by the Scottish Prison Service and prisons in Northern Ireland are managed by the Northern Ireland Prison Service.

== Prisoner categories in England and Wales ==
Prisons in England and Wales are classified based on the age, gender, and security needs of the prisoners they hold.

=== Male adult prisoners ===
Male adult prisoners (those aged 18 or over) are given a security categorisation soon after they enter prison. These categories are based on a combination of the type of crime committed, the length of sentence, the likelihood of escape, and the danger to the public if they were to escape. The four categories are:

Prison type	Category	Prison description
Closed prison	A (high security)	Those whose escape would be highly dangerous to the public or national security, thus necessitating maximum security conditions. Offences that may result in consideration for category A or restricted status include [attempted] murder, manslaughter, [attempted] rape, sexual assault, armed robbery, wounding with intent, kidnapping, importing or supplying class A controlled drugs, possessing or supplying explosives, offences connected with terrorism and offences under the Official Secrets Act.
Closed prison	B	Those who do not require maximum security, but for whom escape still needs to be made very difficult.
Closed prison	C	Those who cannot be trusted in open conditions but who are unlikely to try to escape.
Open prison	D	Those who can be reasonably trusted not to try to escape, and are given the privilege of an open prison. Prisoners at category D prisons, are, subject to approval, given ROTL (release on temporary licence) to work in the community or to go on "home leave" once they have passed their FLED (full licence eligibility dates), which is usually a quarter of the way through the sentence.

Category A, B and C prisons are called closed prisons, whereas category D prisons are called open prisons.

Category A prisoners are further divided into standard risk, high risk and exceptional risk, based on their likelihood of escaping.

Men on remand are held in category B conditions with the exception of some of those who are held to be tried on (very) serious offences. These men are held in "provisional category A" conditions.

Movements of prisoners in Category A is always managed by HM Prison Service, although uncategorised and Category B, C and D movements are covered by the Prisoner Escort and Custody Services contract.

=== Escape list prisoners ===
Prisoners who have made active attempts to escape from custody are placed on the holding prison's escape list. These prisoners (sometimes referred to as "E men" or "E list men") are required to wear distinctive, brightly coloured clothing when being moved both inside and outside of the prison and are handcuffed. In addition they are required to change cells frequently and to have their clothes and some of their personal property removed from their cell before being locked in for the night.

=== Female adult prisoners ===
Women are also classified into four categories. These categories are:

- Restricted status is similar to category A for men.
- Closed is for women who do not require restricted status, but for whom escape must be made very difficult.
- Semi-open was introduced in 2001 and is for those who are unlikely to try to escape, but cannot be trusted in an open prison. This has been phased out; HMP Morton Hall and HMP Drake Hall were re-designated as closed in March 2009.
- Open is for those who can be safely trusted to stay within the prison.

Remand prisoners are always held in closed prisons.

=== Children ===
Children under 18 sentenced or remanded in custody may be placed in one of three types of establishments based on their age, vulnerability, needs, and offence:

- Young offender institutions (YOIs): prison based establishments very similar to adult prisons that hold those convicted and remanded for offences but that only hold males aged 15–20 (ages 15–17 and ages 18–20 are housed separately) and who are not classed as vulnerable.
- Secure training centres (STCs): secure facilities focused on education, welfare, and support rather than traditional punishment. They hold convicted males aged 12–14 and females aged 12–17 in separate accommodation. Males aged 15–17 can also be held if they are classed as vulnerable.
- Secure children's homes (SCHs): similar to STCs in their focus on education, welfare, and support rather than traditional punishment. They hold very young males and females aged 10–11 convicted or remanded usually for only serious offences. Males and females aged 12–14 can also be held if they are classed as vulnerable. Additionally, males and females up to the age of 17 can be held if they are refused bail and remanded (but not yet convicted) to be held by local children's authorities (and not the prison service) usually if they are more vulnerable, at risk or a YOI is not suitable. Not all children in SCHs have been convicted, remanded, or accused of crimes. Some are placed there by court orders for their safety under legislation such as the Children Act 1989, due to reasons such as a history of absconding from open care homes, risk of committing harm to themselves or others, or vulnerability to abuse, drug use, or exploitation.

== Prisoner categories in Scotland ==
Since 2002, in Scotland, prisoners have been assigned to one of three categories:

- High supervision: an individual for whom all activities and movements require to be authorised, supervised and monitored by prison staff.
- Medium supervision: an individual for whom activities and movements are subject to locally specified limited supervision and restrictions.
- Low supervision: an individual for whom activities and movements, specified locally, are subject to minimum supervision and restrictions. Low Supervision prisoners may be entitled to release on temporary licence and unsupervised activities in the community.

== Prisoner categories in Northern Ireland ==
Prisoners (adult and young, male and female) are classified in a similar way to the English/Welsh system:

Category	Prison description
A	Prisoners whose escape would be highly dangerous to the public, the police or the security of the state
B	Prisoners for whom maximum security is not necessary, but for whom escape must be made very difficult
C	Prisoners who cannot be trusted in open conditions but who do not have the resources or will to make a determined escape attempt
D	Prisoners who can reasonably be trusted in open conditions. However, there are at present no open prisons in Northern Ireland.
U	Remand, awaiting trial (also known as "hold for court") or awaiting sentence prisoners are Unclassified (U), although they are placed in Category A or B conditions.

== See also ==
- His Majesty's Prison Service
- Howard League for Penal Reform
- List of prisons in the United Kingdom
- Scottish Prison Service
