= HM Prison Oakwood =

Prison in Staffordshire, England

HMP Oakwood
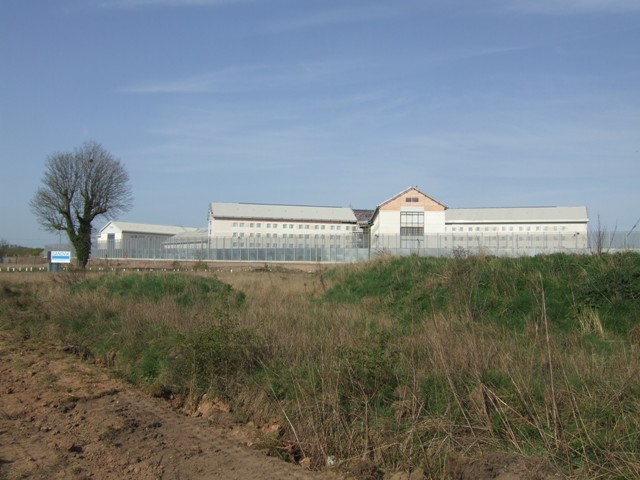
- Oakwood under construction in April 2011
- Interactive map of HMP Oakwood
- Location: Featherstone, Staffordshire, England; 52.646640°N 2.115241°W
- Status: Operational
- Security class: Category C/male
- Capacity: 2,106
- Opened: April 2012
- Former name: Featherstone 2
- Managed by: G4S
- Director: Sean Oliver

HM Prison Oakwood is a Category C prison in Featherstone, Staffordshire, England. Designed to be a titan prison, it was downsized from 2,500 to hold up to 1,605 prisoners. Construction started in August 2009 and it was the first prison in the UK built in a modular fashion. Operated by G4S, it opened in April 2012 and was fully operational by autumn 2012. It was initially called Featherstone 2.

Following the announcement that, along with HMP Birmingham, its operation would be contracted out to a private company, the Prison Officers Association threatened industrial action.

Following a surprise inspection by HM Inspector of Prisons, the report published in October 2013 identified several issues of concern, including a high level of violence. However the Inspectorate's report in August 2024 describes a prison 'where inmates have low rates of violence and self-harm, is praised for ‘bucking trends in challenging times’'

== History ==
Planned initially as a titan prison holding up to 2,500 prisoners, it was downsized following the cancellation of the titan scheme. It was estimated as costing around £180 million and described in the press as a "superprison". The prison is located next to existing prisons HMP Featherstone and HMYOI Brinsford and was constructed by Kier Build. Building the prison at that location required road remodelling to cope with an anticipated additional 1,400 rush-hour journeys on local roads. The A460 Cannock Road was remodelled at the junction with New Road in Featherstone, but the local council was criticised in the local press for not going far enough with the changes.

Preparation of the site began in August 2009. The prison was the first to be built in a modular fashion in the UK, with pre-construction sections containing plumbing, electricity and fire alarm systems. The modules first arrived in February 2010, notably the energy centre for the project. The prison comprised three residential blocks and 13 other buildings.

Although reported by some media outlets as being sold, its operation was contracted out to G4S in March 2011, for fifteen years, along with HMP Birmingham, to become G4S’ fifth and sixth prisons in England and Wales. Secretary of State for Justice Kenneth Clarke announced the outcome of the bidding process in the House of Commons, stating that Featherstone 2 would come in at £31 million less than announced by the previous government.

Following the announcement, the Prison Officers Association announced that its members were "angry" at the privatisation of prisons. The association balloted its members over the issue, stating, "It is important to gauge the view of our members through the ballot box, and if it is their will the POA will take clear and decisive action against the privatisation of Birmingham and Featherstone 2." Steve Gillian, the general secretary, said that "This is a disgraceful decision which is politically driven and morally repulsive." The military were placed on standby should the POA take the threatened strike action.

Clarke was questioned in the Commons at the time of the announcement by constituency MP Gavin Williamson regarding the levels of staff training provided compared to the two publicly run prisons located nearby. He said in response, "That is provided for in the contract and I very much hope it will be the case. Like my hon. Friend, I have great optimism about the future of Featherstone 2. It is very good that we have that kind of investment coming on stream so that we can help to modernise the service in all possible ways. The proper training and support of staff is a key part of delivering the contract properly."

The prison was officially named HMP Oakwood in December 2011, after the oak tree in which Charles II was reputed to have hidden from Oliver Cromwell’s troops during the English Civil War, located in nearby Boscobel Wood.

HMP Oakwood took its first prisoners on 24 April 2012 with the goal of being fully operational by August or September the same year.

== Inspections and concerns ==
In October 2013, the prison was criticised by HM Inspector of Prisons following a surprise inspection. Of particular concern to them was a high level of violence, insufficient staff experience, and lack of sex offender rehabilation. Frances Crook of the Howard League for Penal Reform expressed concerns, stating, "It is well-known in prison circles that this institution is referred to as 'Jokewood' by prisoners and staff across the system, but this isn't a joke – it is deeply serious."

In response, G4S said that steps were being taken to improve the situation. It was subsequently reported that Prisons Ombudsman Nigel Newcomen had identified "serious failings" regarding the death of an inmate. Newcomen reported that prison staff found the inmate collapsed and not breathing in his cell, but were unable to access a defibrillator because it was locked away.

In January 2014, it emerged that ambulances had been called there 358 times in 2013, over twice the amount of any other UK prison.
