= Vaizey =

Vaizey is a surname. Notable people with the surname include:

- Ed Vaizey (born 1968), English politician and journalist
- Mrs George de Horne Vaizey (1857–1917), English writer
- John Vaizey, Baron Vaizey (1929–1984), British writer and economist
- Marina Vaizey (born 1938), British journalist and art critic
