= Tumim =

Tumim is a surname. Notable people with the surname include:

- Stephen Tumim (1930–2003), English judge
- Winifred Tumim (1936–2009), English charity administrator and reform campaigner
