= Lord Vaizey =

Lord Vaizey may refer to:

- John Vaizey, Baron Vaizey (1929–1984), British author and economist
- Ed Vaizey, Baron Vaizey of Didcot (born 1968), British politician, media columnist, political commentator and former barrister
