= Caroline Corby =

Chairperson of the Parole Board for England and Wales

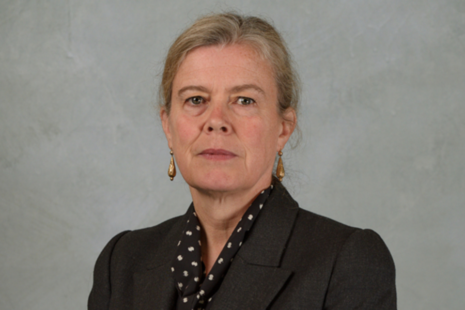
- Corby in 2025
- Born: 1965 (age 60–61)
- Known for: Chairperson, Parole Board for England and Wales
- Board member of: Professional Standards Authority
- Children: 3

Caroline Corby (born 1965) is the Chair of the Board of the Crown Prosecution Service, the Professional Standards Authority for Health and Social Care, and the Peabody Trust, and formerly served as Chair of the Parole Board for England and Wales.

== Early life ==
Corby was born in 1965 and grew up in North London. She has a degree in mathematics and statistics.

== Career ==
Corby’s early career was in private equity in the City of London.

She left the City in 2000 for a career break to raise her three daughters. During this period she had six historical books published in the Before They Were Famous series.

In 2007 she joined the board of the London Probation Trust (LPT) and she was chair from 2012 to 2014. LPT worked with over 60,000 offenders a year to protect the public and reduce re-offending.

Corby joined the Management Committee of the Parole Board in 2015 and became chair in April 2018, succeeding Nick Hardwick. She served as Chair until July 2025, when her term ended and Alexandra Marks CBE succeeded her. The Parole Board is an independent body which decides whether prisoners in England and Wales can be safely released into the community. It determines around 22,000 cases each year. It has around 300 members who make the assessments and decisions. These members are supported by 220 staff.

Corby was a board member (2014-2019) of the Criminal Cases Review Commission, which reviews possible miscarriages of criminal justice in England, Wales and Northern Ireland.

She has been a board member of Cafcass, (2014-2021) which safeguards the welfare of children in the Family Courts in England. Corby was a panel chair for a number of the statutory regulators including the Nursing and Midwifery Council and the General Social Care Council.

In 2021 Corby became chair of the Professional Standards Authority (PSA). The PSA reviews the work of the ten statutory regulators of health and care professionals, accredits organisations that register health and care practitioners in unregulated occupations and gives policy advice and encourages research to improve regulation.

Corby became chair of the Peabody Trust in January 2024. Peabody is a housing association in the United Kingdom that manages homes and provides housing for residents in London and the South East.

Corby is currently the chair of the Crown Prosecution Service. The Crown Prosecution Service is responsible for prosecuting cases investigated by the police and other agencies in England and Wales.

She was a magistrate from 2006-2010.

== Selected publications ==
- Julius Caesar: The Curse of the Gods
- William the Conqueror: Nowhere to Hide
- Pocahontas: The Prophecy of Doom: A Princess Betrayed
- Boudica: The Secrets of the Druids
- Lady Jane Grey: Queen for Sale
- Cleopatra: Escape Down the Nile
