= HM Prison Hewell =

British prison

HMP Hewell
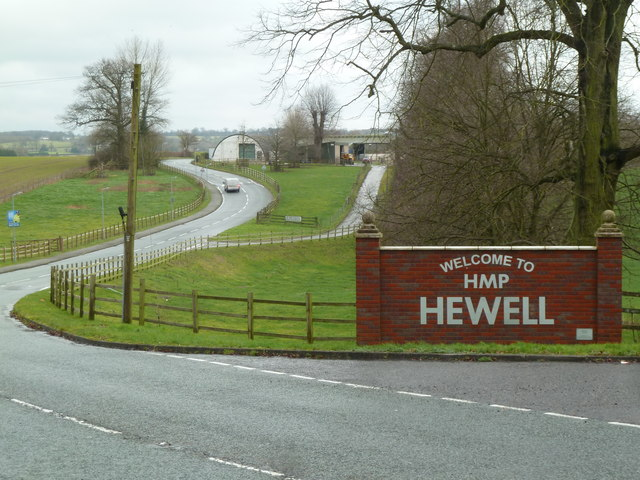
- Road leading to HMP Hewell
- Interactive map of HMP Hewell
- Location: Tardebigge, Worcestershire; 52.3214°N 1.9931°W
- Security class: Adult Male, Category B
- Capacity: 1094 (as of November 2023)
- Population: 992 (as of November 2023)
- Opened: 2008 (1946)
- Former name: HMPs Blakenhurst, Brockhill and Hewell Grange
- Managed by: HM Prison Services
- Governor: Rebecca Hayward
- Website: Hewell at justice.gov.uk

HM Prison Hewell is a category B (formerly multiple categories) men's prison in the village of Tardebigge in Worcestershire, England. The prison is operated by His Majesty's Prison Service.

On 16 October 2019, the Ministry of Justice announced that HMP Hewell's open site (the former HMP Hewell Grange) would close owing to its condition, branded by inspectors as unacceptable, and refurbishing would not deliver value for the taxpayer. The site closed in March 2020.

== History ==
Hewell Prison is on the site of the Hewell Grange country house and estate, the former seat of the Earls of Plymouth, and has open days for its park and garden. The estate was sold to the government around 1945, and in 1946 the main house was used as a borstal.

Over the years, two other prisons were purpose-built and opened on the estate, HMP Blakenhurst and HMP Brockhill, to hold other categories of prisoner, with enlargements. The borstal itself was reclassified in 1991 to a Category D open prison, and renamed HMP Hewell Grange. The new 650-bed prison was operated by UK Detention Services, a partnership among Mowlem, Sir Robert McAlpine Limited and Corrections Corporation of America.

In January 2008, the Prison Service announced that the three prisons would merge to be managed by a single team. Its provisional name for public consultation was "HMP Redditch"; however, local residents objected and in March 2008 it was decided to rename the site HMP Hewell. HMP Hewell was formally created on 25 June 2008, and was the first in an efficiency drive involving the creation of new Titan prisons in the United Kingdom.

The Ministry of Justice closed the Brockhill part of the prison in September 2011. The closure formed part of wide-ranging cost-saving measures, with one other prison shut in 2011.

In July 2017, Tornado squads were brought in to deal with a prison riot in House Block 6, A-spur. The riot was instigated following the start of a phased smoking ban; House Block 6 was the first to have the ban imposed. Overcrowding, living conditions, unexplained lockdowns and lack of prison officers were all contributing factors. The rioters damaged water pipework, the CCTV system and numerous cells. The trouble was confined to one area of the prison, which was back in the control of the prison officers within a few hours. The wing where the riot took place was deemed unfit for occupation owing to the damage caused, and inmates housed in that area were either moved to other prisons or relocated to other cell blocks within Hewell. It took several weeks for the area to be brought back into use.

== The prison today ==
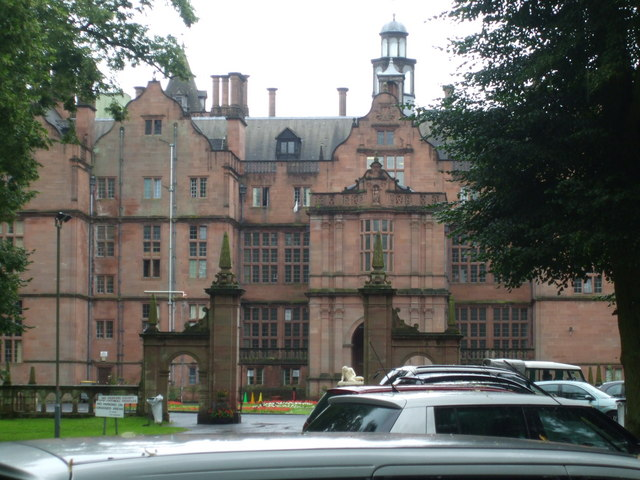
The former Category D site building

Hewell is a category B prison for adult men. The prison primarily serves the Worcestershire, West Midlands and Warwickshire catchment area. Accommodation is divided into six house blocks. House block 8, which formerly referred to the "open" or Category D section of the prison at Hewell Grange, was closed in March 2020, following a report by inspectors.

Category B prisoners are employed in workshops providing construction industry training, double glazing manufacture, industrial cleaning, waste management, and laundry and contract services. Education offered includes ICT courses, ESOL course, basic literacy and numeracy courses, and art and cookery classes.

Category D prisoners used to have access to external college courses, distance learning provided by The Open University, as well as a range of ICT, literacy and numeracy courses. Employment was provided throughout the estate including on farms, in gardens and in the kitchen, with full-time employment offered through a Resettlement to Work Scheme.

In January 2017, an inspection report described Hewell as "a prison with many challenges and areas of serious concern". Prison inspectorPeter Clarke said: "The main concerns at the closed site were regarding issues of safety and respect." Clarke also stated that levels of violence were "far too high", he described communal areas as "dirty" and he claimed that many cells were over-crowded, with some "filthy". 60% said getting drugs was easy, a quarter of prisoners felt unsafe, and self harm had increased.

In December 2017, ten people were convicted of smuggling a range of contraband into Hewell and other prisons following the chance filming of a wildlife programme in adjacent fields.

In 2019, a prisoner died of burns after smoking spice and igniting his clothing. The prisoner rang his bell, but it took sixteen minutes before staff responded; the delay contributed to the prisoner's death.

On 16 October 2019, the Ministry of Justice announced that HMP Hewell's open site (the former HMP Hewell Grange) would close owing to its current condition, branded by inspectors as unacceptable, and refurbishing would not deliver value for the taxpayer.

== Notable inmates ==
- James Holder - Businessman and co-founder of fashion brand Superdry convicted of raping a woman in May 2022.

== See also ==
- Hewell Grange
