= HM Inspectorate of Prisons (England and Wales) =

Statutory body in England and Wales

Agency overview
- Formed: 1982
- Jurisdiction: England and Wales
- Headquarters: London, England
- Agency executive: Charlie Taylor, Chief Inspector
- Website: https://hmiprisons.justiceinspectorates.gov.uk/

His Majesty's Inspectorate of Prisons, or simply HMI Prisons, is an independent statutory body in England and Wales, funded by the Ministry of Justice. It acts as one of 5 inspectorates of the criminal justice system of England & Wales; His Majesty's Crown Prosecution Service Inspectorate, His Majesty's Inspectorate of Constabulary and Fire & Rescue Services, His Majesty's Inspectorate of Probation, and the Criminal Justice Joint Inspectorate.

The Inspectorate is tasked with inspecting places of detention in England and Wales and reporting its findings on the conditions and treatment therein. The inspectorate has both Scottish and Northern Irish counterparts.

== Role and functions ==
=== Statutory duties ===
In statute, the role of the Inspectorate is established via statutory duties on the Chief Inspector. These duties were established by the Criminal Justice Act 1982 and inserted as s5A of the Prison Act 1952.

Appointment and functions of Her Majesty’s Chief Inspector of Prisons.

(1)Her Majesty may appoint a person to be Chief Inspector of Prisons.

(2)It shall be the duty of the Chief Inspector to inspect or arrange for the inspection of prisons in England and Wales and to report to the Secretary of State on them.

(3)The Chief Inspector shall in particular report to the Secretary of State on the treatment of prisoners and conditions in prisons.

(4)The Secretary of State may refer specific matters connected with prisons in England and Wales and prisoners in them to the Chief Inspector and direct him to report on them.

(5)The Chief Inspector shall in each year submit to the Secretary of State a report in such form as the Secretary of State may direct, and the Secretary of State shall lay a copy of that report before Parliament.

Schedule A1 of the Act provides for the delgation of functions, which allows for the existence of the Inspectorate as a body. It further provides that the Chief Inspector shall provide documents to the Secretary of State on proposed inspections and how they will be conducted, however the right of the Chief Inspector to visit prisons without notice is explicitly preserved.

=== OPCAT duties ===
The Optional Protocol to the United Nations Convention against Torture and Other Cruel, Inhuman or Degrading Treatment or Punishment (OPCAT) is an international human rights treaty that requires parties to establish and maintain visiting bodies to prevent torture, and inhuman or degrading treatment or punishment.

The treaty names these visiting bodies "national preventive mechanisms" (NPMs) and requires that parties enable the work of NPMs, this includes (inter alia) that:

- "The States Parties shall guarantee the functional independence of the national preventive mechanisms as well as the independence of their personnel." - Art 18.1
- "The national preventive mechanisms shall be granted at a minimum the power: ...To make recommendations to the relevant authorities with the aim of improving the treatment and the conditions of the persons deprived of their liberty and to prevent torture and other cruel, inhuman or degrading treatment or punishment, taking into consideration the relevant norms of the United Nations;" - Art 19(b)
- "The competent authorities of the State Party concerned shall examine the recommendations of the national preventive mechanism and enter into a dialogue with it on possible implementation measures." - Art 22
- "The States Parties to the present Protocol undertake to publish and disseminate the annual reports of the national preventive mechanisms." - Art 23

HM Inspectorate of Prisons is one of 21 staturoy bodies designated as part of the NPM in the UK. It therefore has an obligation to maintain its independence, make recommendations on improving the conditions of those in detention, enter a dialogue about those recommendations, and to publish annual reports on its activities.

== Methodology ==
The Inspectorate applies a methodology that has been described as "broadly speaking, the same as those used by social scientists in other settings, drawing on qualitative and quantitative approaches." The Inspectorate relies on 5 main methods; observation, speaking to detainees, speaking to staff, speaking to other organisations, and documentation.

The Inspectorate's self-established criteria includes 4 "healthy establishment tests."

- Safety - "Prisoners, particularly the most vulnerable, are held safely."
- Respect - "Prisoners are treated with respect for their human dignity."
- Purposeful activity - "Prisoners are able, and expected, to engage in activity that is likely to benefit them."
- Preparation for release - "Prisoners are supported to maintain and develop relationships with their family and friends. Prisoners are helped to reduce their likelihood of reoffending and their risk of harm is managed effectively. Prisoners are prepared for their release back into the community."

Each of these is then rated on a scale of "good," "resonably good," "not sufficiently good," and "poor." These ratings reflect how adversely affected detainees are in these areas, with "good" reflecting no evidence of adverse effect and "poor" reflecting serious adverse effect.

== Key findings ==
The Inspectorate regularly publishes reports on individual prisons in addition to its annual reports. These reports are sometimes described as critical of prisons inspected when they make the news. In 2026, particular media attention was drawn to conditions in HMP Woodhill in Milton Keynes. Initially the prison was placed on urgent notice for the second time in 3 years due to high rates of violence, self-harm, and drug use. Lord Timpson, Minister of State for Prisons, Probation and Reducing Reoffending, responded to the report by announcing that "[w]e are putting more staff on the ground and backing HMP Woodhill with the investment it needs to improve."

Drug use and violence are prominent findings among Inspectorate reports, with violence at Wetherby Young Offender Institution, and HMP Swaleside, and availability of drugs at HMP Featherstone, also being reported on in the same period of late 2025 to early 2026.

In August 2025, HMP Lincoln was referenced as setting standards for other prisons, albeit overcrowding and time spent in cells were cited as concerns.

== See also ==
- Prisons and Probation Ombudsman
