= His Majesty's Inspectorate of Prisons =

His Majesty's Inspectorate of Prisons may refer to:

- HM Inspectorate of Prisons (England and Wales), statutory body in England and Wales
- HM Inspectorate of Prisons for Scotland, statutory body in Scotland
