= Sue McAllister =

Sue McAllister CB
- Born: Grimethorpe, South Yorkshire, England, U.K.
- Occupations: Ombudsman; prison officer and governor
- Known for: First women to lead the Northern Ireland Prison Service
- Spouse: Danny McAllister CBE

Director General of the Northern Ireland Prison Service
- In office 2012–2016
- Preceded by: Colin McConnell

Prisons and Probation Ombudsman for England and Wales
- In office 2018–2023
- Succeeded by: Adrian Usher

Chief Inspector of Probation
- In office 2023–2024
- Preceded by: Justin Russell
- Succeeded by: Martin Jones

Sue McAllister CB is a British ombudsman and former prison officer and governor. McAllister was the Director General of the Northern Ireland Prison Service between 2012 and 2016; and was the first woman to hold the post. Prior to this, she was Governor of HM Prison Gartree and HM Prison Onley. McAllister served as the Prisons and Probation Ombudsman for England and Wales between 2018 and 2023; and as the Chief Inspector of Probation between 2023 and 2024.

== Career ==
Originally from South Yorkshire, Sue McAllister joined Her Majesty's Prison Service in England and Wales and worked for the service for 25 years. This included roles as the Governor of both HM Prison Gartree, an adult prison, and HM Prison Onley, a young offender institutions. McAllister was involved in the review team who investigated the suicide of Colin Bell, an offender under the care of the Northern Ireland Prison Service at HM Prison Maghaberry in 2008. The report was highly critical of the way in which his case was managed. She then worked in the Ministry of Justice as head of the Public Sector Bids Unit until she retired in 2012.

In May 2012 McAllister was appointed as the new head of the Northern Ireland Prison Service, the first time a woman was named to this post, or a similar post elsewhere in the UK. McAllister replaced Colin McConnell, who had become head of the Scottish Prison Service. She took over the post in July 2012. In August 2016, she announced that she would be resigning from the post in October that year in order to retire.

McAllister served as the Prisons and Probation Ombudsman for England and Wales between 2018 and 2023; and, served as the interim Chief Inspector of Probation between 2023 and 2024.

== Personal life ==
McAllister is married to Danny McAllister CBE with two children.

McAllister was named a Companion of the Bath in Queen Elizabeth II's 2017 New Years honours for services to the Northern Ireland Prison Service.
