= James Hennessy (diplomat) =

British diplomat and public servant (1923–2024)

- Born: 26 September 1923
- Died: 25 February 2024 (aged 100)
- Education: Bedford School; King's College, Durham
- Occupations: diplomat and public servant

Sir James Patrick Ivan Hennessy KBE CMG (26 September 1923 – 25 February 2024) was a British diplomat and public servant who was Her Majesty's Chief Inspector of Prisons from 1982 to 1987.

== Early years ==
Educated at Bedford School and then King's College, Durham (now part of Newcastle University), Hennessy joined the Royal Artillery in 1942, and was then seconded to the Indian Army from 1944 to 1946.

== Career ==
After World War II, Hennessy joined what was then HM Overseas Service, serving initially in Basutoland from 1948 in a number of roles, seconded in 1961 to the Office of the High Commissioner in Pretoria and taking on a number of positions in the government of South Africa. He retired from the Overseas Service in 1968 and was appointed to the Foreign Office, serving as Chargé d'Affaires to Montevideo, Uruguay for 1971–72, and then High Commissioner to Kampala, Uganda and non-resident Ambassador to Kigali, Rwanda, 1973–76. He served as Consul-General in Cape Town from 1977 to 1980, before ending his career as the last Governor and Commander-in-Chief of Belize (now Belize) from 1980 to 1981.

In 1982, Hennessy was appointed the second ever HM Chief Inspector of Prisons, taking over from Bill Pearce, previously the Chief Inspector of Probation for Inner London whose tenure as HMCIP was cut short by illness. Hennessy served a five-year term until 1987. After stepping down as Chief Inspector to be replaced by Judge Sir Stephen Tumim, Hennessy served on the Parole Board for England and Wales until 1991 and as a Trustee of the Butler Trust until 1998.

== Later life and death ==
Hennessy turned 100 in September 2023, and died on 25 February 2024.

== Honours and recognition ==
Hennessy was appointed a Member of the Order of the British Empire (MBE) in the 1959 New Year Honours, promoted to Officer of the Order of the British Empire (OBE) in the 1968 New Year Honours and to Knight Commander of the Order of the British Empire (KBE) in the 1982 New Year Honours. He was also made a Companion of the Order of St Michael and St George (CMG) in the 1975 New Year Honours.

== Positions held ==
Diplomatic posts
Preceded by Geoffrey Jackson	Chargé d’Affaires to Montevideo, Uruguay; 1971–1972	Succeeded by Peter Oliver
Preceded by The Lord Buckmaster	High Commissioner to Kampala, Uganda and non-resident Ambassador to Kigali, Rwanda; 1973–1976	Unknown
Preceded by Henry Julian Downing	Consul-General in Cape Town; 1977–1980	Unknown
Preceded by Peter Donovan McEntee	Governor and Commander- -in-Chief of Belize; 1980–1981	Belize granted independence - Dame Minita Gordon became Governor-General of Belize
Government offices
Preceded by	Her Majesty's Chief; Inspector of Prisons; 1982–1987	Succeeded by Judge Sir Stephen Tumim
