= Unlock (charity) =

British charity

Unlock National Association of Ex-Offenders, commonly referred to as Unlock, is an independent United Kingdom-based charity, established in 2000 to campaign for the equality of reformed offenders. Unlock describes its vision as "A fair and inclusive society where people with criminal records can move on positively in their lives".

== Charitable objectives ==
- People moving on positively in their lives - individuals have the knowledge, skills, confidence and support to overcome the long-term disadvantages caused by their criminal records.
- A fairer and more inclusive society - government, employers and others have policies, practices and attitudes that support fair treatment of people with criminal records.

== History ==
The association was originally established in 1998 by a group of reformed offenders who had successfully rebuilt their lives after serving prison sentences. They wanted to use their experience of the great difficulties faced by those coming out of prison to assist others who genuinely wanted to "go straight". This group included Stephen Fry, Bob Turney and founding Chief Executive Mark Leech, who left the organization in May 2002 to pursue commercial interests. Bobby Cummines was Chief Executive until he stepped down in March 2012 to pursue private business interests and he was succeeded by Chris Bath who held the role of Executive Director until March 2013. Unlock’s first president was Sir Stephen Tumim a former judge and former HM Chief Inspector of Prisons. Unlock gained charitable status in the year 2000. In 2007 it rebranded as Unlock, The National Association of Reformed Offenders in order to emphasize the journey which its members had been on. In 2013, the charity adopted the slogan "for people with convictions", changing this in April 2021 to "for people with criminal records".

== Activities ==
The charity delivers charitably-funded services for people with criminal records. This includes a peer-run helpline that deals with over 10,000 enquiries a year, and a range of online services, including a self-help information site, online forum and a disclosure calculator.

The charity also works with government, employers, insurers and others, to challenge and support so that people with criminal records are treated fairly.

== Leadership ==
The current president of Unlock is Judge John Samuels KC. He succeeded the previous president, David Ramsbotham, Baron Ramsbotham, former HM Chief Inspector of Prisons and a cross-bencher life peer of the House of Lords who served as president until his death in December 2022.

The CEO of Unlock is Paula Harriott, a nationally known lived-experience leader, who has held the position since August 2024.

== Funding ==
The organisation is funded by voluntary donations from both individuals and charitable organisations. Major projects are funded by grants from charitable trusts.
