= Nick Hardwick (executive) =

British businessman

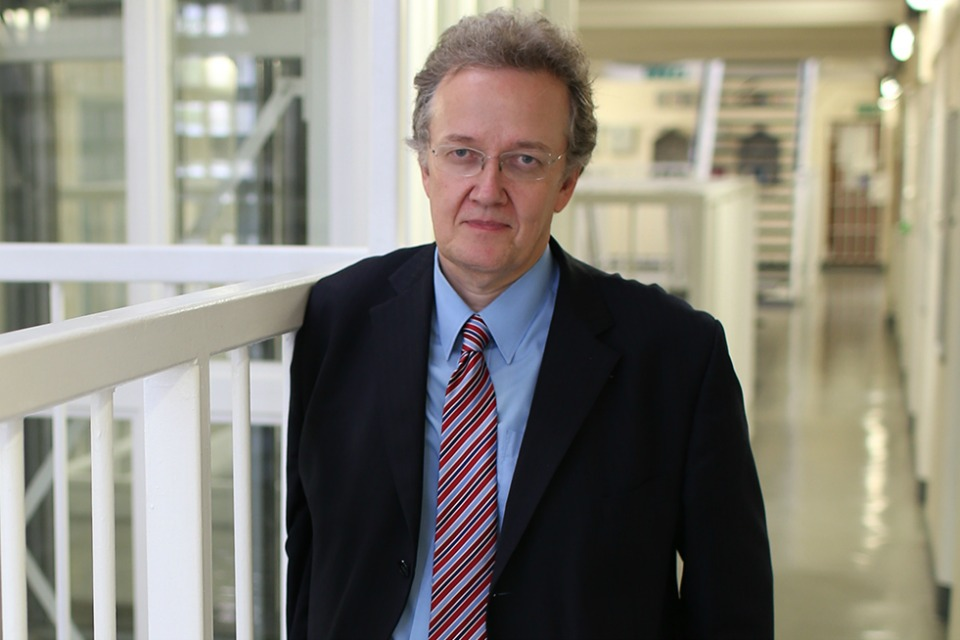

Her Majesty's Chief Inspector of Prisons
- In office 2010–2016
- Preceded by: Dame Anne Owers
- Succeeded by: Peter Clarke

Nicholas Lionel Hardwick CBE (born 19 July 1957) is a British executive who has led UK-based charities and criminal justice organisations. Most recently he was chair of the Parole Board for England and Wales from March 2016 until his resignation on 28 March 2018 following a legal challenge to a Parole Board decision to release convicted serial rapist John Worboys.

== Early life ==
Nick Hardwick was born on 19 July 1957, in Surrey. He was educated at Epsom College and the University of Hull, where he earned a third class honours degree in English literature in 1979.

== Career ==
From 1986 to 1995 he was chief executive of the charity Centrepoint.

From June 1995 to January 2003, he was chief executive of the Refugee Council.

Hardwick was appointed in December 2002 as the chair of the Independent Police Complaints Commission, taking office in February 2003; the IPCC existed in shadow form from 1 April 2003, and formally replaced the Police Complaints Authority on 1 April 2004. As IPCC chair he defended its investigations which included enquiries into the death of Jean Charles de Menezes and the policing of the 2009 G20 London summit protests.

From July 2010, he was Her Majesty's Chief Inspector of Prisons, replacing Anne Owers. He was appointed CBE in the 2010 Birthday Honours.

Hardwick was appointed chair of the Parole Board for England and Wales in March 2016, and resigned on 28 March 2018 following a successful legal challenge which led to the quashing of the Parole Board decision to release John Worboys from prison on licence. Hardwick had played no role in the decision of the Board's panel, but said he took "accountability for the work of the Board", and, after being told by the Secretary of State for Justice (David Gauke) that his position was untenable, resigned with immediate effect. He was succeeded by Caroline Corby.

Non-profit organization positions
Preceded by Alf Dubs	Chief Executive of the Refugee Council; 1995–2003	Succeeded by Maeve Sherlock
Government offices
Preceded by Anne Owers	Her Majesty's Chief Inspector of Prisons; 2010–2016	Succeeded by Peter Clarke
