= Wantage (constituency) =

UK Parliament constituency (1983–2024)

Coordinates: 51.60°N 1.43°W

- Former county constituency for the House of Commons
- Boundary of Wantage in Oxfordshire

- Location of Oxfordshire within England
- County: Oxfordshire
- Electorate: 90,876 (December 2019)
- Major settlements: Wantage, Didcot, Wallingford, Faringdon

1983–2024
- Seats: One
- Created from: Abingdon (majority of) (note: abolished)
- Replaced by: Didcot and Wantage

Wantage was a constituency (Note: A county constituency (for the purposes of election expenses and type of returning officer)) in Oxfordshire represented in the House of Commons of the Parliament of the United Kingdom. (Note: As with all constituencies, the constituency elects one Member of Parliament (MP) by the first past the post system of election at least every five years.)

Its final MP was the Conservative David Johnston, who was first elected at the 2019 general election replacing Ed Vaizey who served as MP for Wantage for 14 years after first being elected at the 2005 general election.

Further to the completion of the 2023 Periodic Review of Westminster constituencies, the seat was abolished. Subject to a reduction in size, with northern and western areas, including the town of Faringdon, being transferred to Witney, it was reformed as Didcot and Wantage, to be first contested at the 2024 general election.

== Constituency profile ==
The Wantage constituency covered the south-western part of Oxfordshire. There were three market towns in the constituency: Faringdon, Wallingford and Wantage. All have tourist attractions, Wantage having monuments to being the birthplace of King Alfred the Great, Wallingford, ancient enclosure walls of a castle and a medieval bridge. (Note: The town was granted a Royal Charter in 1155 and sent two MPs from 1295 until 1832, see Wallingford (UK Parliament constituency)) Faringdon bears a scar of the English Civil War as its church lost its steeple. The largest town in the constituency was Didcot, which grew up around the Great Western Railway when Isambard Kingdom Brunel built a branch line from its main line between London and Bristol to Oxford, siting the junction at the then-sparsely-populated parish and it has a power station and many major national construction and aggregate industries.

The constituency was mostly rural in character, with more than 400 farms in operation. Included were the Uffington White Horse and The Ridgeway, a prehistoric road, runs along its southern border. The River Thames runs along the northern and western border. The area is affluent and Conservative in nature containing many commuters with fast transport links to London, with Didcot the only area with a strong Labour vote locally. The seat includes international race horse breeders and trainers with racing stables across a broad area that reaches into the Lambourn Downs, crossing over the southern border into the Newbury constituency in Berkshire.

Workless claimants, registered jobseekers, were in November 2012 significantly lower than the national average of 3.8%, at 1.6% of the population based on a statistical compilation by The Guardian.

== History ==
The constituency was created for the 1983 general election further to the Third Periodic Review of Westminster constituencies. This followed on from the reorganisation of local government under the Local Government Act 1972 which came into force in April 1974, and saw the bulk of the area represented by the constituency of Abingdon in Berkshire being transferred to Oxfordshire. Under the Review, the majority of the Abingdon constituency formed the new constituency of Wantage, with the town of Abingdon-on-Thames and areas to the west of Oxford being included in the new constituency of Oxford West and Abingdon.

The first MP for Wantage was Robert Jackson, who served as a junior minister under both Margaret Thatcher and John Major. Jackson defected to the Labour Party in 2005 shortly before standing down as an MP for the 2005 general election. At that election, Ed Vaizey was elected as the MP for Wantage and between 2010 and 2016 held the post of Minister for Culture, Communications and Creative Industries.

Ed Vaizey served as MP for Wantage until the 2019 general election whereby Vaizey announced that he would be standing down. Shortly prior to this, Vaizey had the Conservative whip removed after voting against Prime Minister Boris Johnson on 3 September 2019. Vaizey had the Conservative whip restored on 29 October 2019. This meant that, for a brief time, Wantage was represented by an independent MP. David Johnston was selected as the Conservative candidate to represent Wantage and was duly elected as the new MP for Wantage at the 2019 general election.

The seat, including its forerunner, was won by Conservative Party candidates since 1924. The 2015 result made the seat the 76th-safest of the Conservative Party's 331 seats by percentage of majority.

All five parties' candidates achieved more than the deposit-retaining threshold of 5% of the vote in 2015. Social Democrat candidate Winifred Tumin won the largest third-party share of the vote to date, in the 1983 election — 32.3% of the vote.

== Boundaries and boundary changes ==
=== 1983–2010 ===
- The District of Vale of White Horse wards of Appleton, Craven, Drayton, Faringdon and Littleworth, Greendown, Grove, Harwell and Chilton, Hendred, Icknield, Island Villages, Kingston Bagpuize and Southmoor, Longworth, Marcham, Segsbury, Shrivenham, Stanford, Steventon, Sutton Courtenay, The Coxwells, and Upton and Blewbury; and
- The District of South Oxfordshire wards of Brightwell, Cholsey, Didcot North, Didcot Northbourne, Didcot South, Hagbourne, and Wallingford.

The new constituency included Wantage, Wallingford, Faringdon and Didcot which had previously all been part of the abolished constituency of Abingdon.

=== 2010–2024 ===
Map of boundaries 2010–2024
- The District of Vale of White Horse wards of Blewbury and Upton, Craven, Drayton, Faringdon and The Coxwells, Greendown, Grove, Hanneys, Harwell, Hendreds, Kingston Bagpuize with Southmoor, Longworth, Marcham and Shippon, Shrivenham, Stanford, Sutton Courtenay and Appleford, Wantage Charlton, and Wantage Segsbury; and
- The District of South Oxfordshire wards of Brightwell, Cholsey and Wallingford South, Didcot All Saints, Didcot Ladygrove, Didcot Northbourne, Didcot Park, Hagbourne, and Wallingford North.

Marginal changes due to the realignment of the boundaries following changes to local authority wards.

=== Abolition ===
Under the 2023 Periodic Review of Westminster constituencies, the Boundary Commission for England proposed boundary changes to the Wantage constituency to reduce the number of electorate in the constituency. At the time of the 2019 General Election, Wantage's total electorate was 90,845, making it the largest constituency in Oxfordshire and the 13th largest in the United Kingdom. The proposals reduced the total electorate to 74,356 which is significantly closer to the average electorate of 72,200 for constituencies in England.

The commission proposed the renaming of the Wantage constituency to Didcot and Wantage. The boundary changes saw the wards of Faringdon, Kingston Bagpuize, Thames, and Watchfield and Shrivenham move into the Witney constituency, whilst the new Didcot and Wantage constituency absorbed the small villages of Clifton Hampden, Culham, Nuneham Courtenay and Sandford-on-Thames from the Henley constituency.

== Members of Parliament ==
Election	Member	Party
1983	Robert Jackson	Conservative
Jan 2005	Robert Jackson	Labour
2005	Ed Vaizey	Conservative
Oct 2019	Ed Vaizey	Independent
Oct 2019	Ed Vaizey	Conservative
2019	David Johnston	Conservative

== Elections ==
=== Elections in the 2010s ===
General election 2019: Wantage
Party	Candidate	Votes	%	±%
Conservative	David Johnston	34,085	50.7	−3.5
Liberal Democrats	Richard Benwell	21,432	31.9	+17.4
Labour	Jonny Roberts	10,181	15.2	−11.7
Independent	Mark Gray	1,475	2.2	New
Majority		12,653	18.8	−8.5
Turnout		67,173	73.9	+1.4
Conservative hold		Swing	−10.4	

General election 2017: Wantage
Party	Candidate	Votes	%	±%
Conservative	Ed Vaizey	34,459	54.2	+0.9
Labour Co-op	Rachel Eden	17,079	26.9	+10.9
Liberal Democrats	Christopher Carrigan	9,234	14.5	+1.4
Green	Sue Ap-Roberts	1,546	2.4	−2.7
UKIP	David McLeod	1,284	2.0	−10.5
Majority		17,380	27.3	−10.0
Turnout		63,602	72.5	+2.2
Conservative hold		Swing	−4.95	

General election 2015: Wantage
Party	Candidate	Votes	%	±%
Conservative	Ed Vaizey	31,092	53.3	+1.3
Labour	Stephen Webb	9,343	16.0	+2.1
Liberal Democrats	Alex Meredith	7,611	13.1	−14.8
UKIP	Lee Upcraft	7,288	12.5	+8.2
Green	Kate Prendergast	2,986	5.1	+3.2
Majority		21,749	37.3	+17.2
Turnout		58,320	70.3	+0.3
Conservative hold		Swing	−0.4	

General election 2010: Wantage
Party	Candidate	Votes	%	±%
Conservative	Ed Vaizey	29,284	52.0	+8.9
Liberal Democrats	Alan Armitage	15,737	27.9	+0.3
Labour	Steven Mitchell	7,855	13.9	−10.0
UKIP	Jacqueline Jones	2,421	4.3	+2.8
Green	Adam Twine	1,044	1.9	−0.7
Majority		13,547	24.1	+8.7
Turnout		56,341	70.0	+1.9
Conservative hold		Swing	+4.3	

=== Elections in the 2000s ===
General election 2005: Wantage
Party	Candidate	Votes	%	±%
Conservative	Ed Vaizey	22,354	43.0	+3.4
Liberal Democrats	Andrew Crawford	14,337	27.6	−0.4
Labour	Mark McDonald	12,464	24.0	−4.2
Green	Adam Twine	1,332	2.6	+0.4
UKIP	Nikolai Tolstoy	798	1.5	−0.4
English Democrat	Gerald Lambourne	646	1.2	New
Majority		8,017	15.4	+4.0
Turnout		51,931	68.2	+3.7
Conservative hold		Swing	+1.9	

General election 2001: Wantage
Party	Candidate	Votes	%	±%
Conservative	Robert Jackson	19,475	39.6	−0.2
Labour	Stephen Beer	13,875	28.2	−0.7
Liberal Democrats	Neil Fawcett	13,776	28.0	+1.5
Green	David Brooks-Saxl	1,062	2.2	+1.1
UKIP	Nikolai Tolstoy	941	1.9	+1.1
Majority		5,600	11.4	+0.5
Turnout		49,129	64.5	−13.6
Conservative hold		Swing	+0.3	

=== Elections in the 1990s ===
General election 1997: Wantage
Party	Candidate	Votes	%	±%
Conservative	Robert Jackson	22,311	39.8	−14.2
Labour	Celia Wilson	16,222	28.9	+9.4
Liberal Democrats	Jenny Riley	14,862	26.5	−2.4
Referendum	Stuart Rising	1,549	2.8	New
Green	Miriam Kennet	640	1.1	−0.4
UKIP	Nikolai Tolstoy	465	0.8	New
Majority		6,089	10.9	−18.2
Turnout		56,049	78.1	−4.6
Conservative hold		Swing		

General election 1992: Wantage
Party	Candidate	Votes	%	±%
Conservative	Robert Jackson	30,575	54.1	+0.1
Liberal Democrats	RMC Morgan	14,102	25.0	−5.5
Labour Co-op	Vivian Woodell	10,955	19.4	+3.9
Green	RJ Ely	867	1.5	New
Majority		16,473	29.1	+5.6
Turnout		56,499	82.7	+4.8
Conservative hold		Swing	+2.8	

=== Elections in the 1980s ===
General election 1987: Wantage
Party	Candidate	Votes	%	±%
Conservative	Robert Jackson	27,951	54.0	+1.1
SDP	Winifred Tumim	15,795	30.5	−1.8
Labour	Stephen Ladyman	8,055	15.5	+1.0
Majority		12,156	23.5	+2.9
Turnout		51,801	77.9	+1.0
Conservative hold		Swing	+1.5	

General election 1983: Wantage
Party	Candidate	Votes	%	±%
Conservative	Robert Jackson	25,992	52.9	
SDP	Winifred Tumim	15,867	32.3	
Labour	Andrew Popper	7,115	14.5	
Wessex Regionalists	AP Mockler	183	0.4	
Majority		10,125	20.6	
Turnout		49,157	76.9	
Conservative win (new seat)				

== See also ==
- List of parliamentary constituencies in Oxfordshire
- Banbury (UK Parliament constituency)
- Henley (UK Parliament constituency)
- Oxford East (UK Parliament constituency)
- Oxford West and Abingdon (UK Parliament constituency)
- Witney (UK Parliament constituency)
