= Anne Owers =

British prison inspector

Owers's voice
from the BBC programme Desert Island Discs, 4 March 2011

Dame Anne Elizabeth Owers, DBE (née Spark; born 23 June 1947) was Her Majesty's Chief Inspector of Prisons. Owers was the fifth holder of the post, appointed in August 2001, succeeding David Ramsbotham. Her appointment was renewed in June 2006 and in March 2008. She was appointed as the first National chair the Independent Monitoring Boards in October 2017. She was chair of the Independent Police Complaints Commission, and prior to this, she directed JUSTICE, the UK-based human rights and law reform organisation.

Owers was educated at Washington Grammar School, County Durham, and studied history at Girton College, Cambridge. On graduating she went to Zambia to teach and to carry out research into African history. While taking time out to bring up her three children, Owers continued to undertake research and voluntary advice and race relations work. She joined the Joint Council for the Welfare of Immigrants in 1981 as a research and development officer and was appointed its general secretary four years later.

In June 2008, she was appointed Chairman of Christian Aid, succeeding John Gladwin. She opposed the Government's former proposal to build "Titan jails".

Owers was appointed Commander of the Order of the British Empire (CBE) in 2000 for her work in human rights and elevated to Dame Commander of the Order of the British Empire (DBE) in the 2009 New Year Honours.

In 2010, she was appointed to the position of Chairman of Clinks, a charity that supports the work of the voluntary and community sector working with offenders and their families. She is also a Trustee of The Butler Trust.

She was appointed head of the Independent Police Complaints Commission (IPCC) in March 2012. In July 2012, she gave the 2012 John Harris Memorial Lecture, hosted by the Police Foundation. Also in 2012, she was the winner of the Perrie Award.

Government offices
| Preceded by David Ramsbotham | Her Majesty's Chief Inspector of Prisons; 2001–2010 | Succeeded by Nick Hardwick |
