= Adrian Usher =

English and Welsh Ombudsman

- Born: c.1967 (age 58–59)
- Occupations: Ombudsman; police officer
- Employer: Metropolitan Police (1987—2023)

Prisons and Probation Ombudsman for England and Wales
- Incumbent
- Assumed office 24 April 2023
- Nominated by: Justice Select Committee
- Appointed by: Lord Chancellor
- Preceded by: Sue McAllister

Adrian Usher (born c. 1967) is a British ombudsman and former police officer. Usher has served as the Prisons and Probation Ombudsman for England and Wales since April 2023 following a pre-appointment hearing by the Justice Select Committee. In 2026, the Lord Chancellor approved his reappointment as Ombudsman for a further three years, to conclude on 24 April 2029.

== Career ==
Usher previously worked for the Metropolitan Police for 35 years. He served as the Borough Commander for Barnet and served on both Counter-Terrorism and Anti-Corruption Commands. Giving evidence to the parliamentary Joint Committee on Human Rights, Usher, who was at that time, Commander, said it should not be enough for a protest to be "peaceful" to be considered lawful, after protests by Extinction Rebellion disrupted parts of London in April 2019.

In October 2023, the Lord Chancellor commissioned Usher to undertake an independent investigation into abuse at Medomsley Detention Centre; and his report was published in November 2025. Minister for Youth Justice Jake Richards apologised to the victims and created the Youth Custody Safeguarding Panel to look at how professionals work with young people in custody.
