= John Huntbach =

John Huntbach (1639–1705) was an English antiquary who lived at Featherstone in Staffordshire. He was the nephew and pupil of Sir William Dugdale and is widely regarded as "Featherstone’s most celebrated resident." He married Mary Gough (b.27 Sept 1636) of Bushbury; she died in 1704. John Huntbach was the son of Thomas Huntbach, whose sister Margery had married Sir William Dugdale. Dugdale was thus John Huntbach's uncle.

Huntbach was most notable as a collector of rare and important historical manuscripts, consisting mostly of copies of parish registers, family records and documents and histories of the titled families of Staffordshire. These proved extremely useful to later historians. For example, Shaw's "History of Staffordshire," relied heavily on Huntbach's manuscripts for much of its information content.

The Huntbach surname is reputed to come from a small place near Eccleshall in the time of King Edward III.

== External sources ==
- THE HUNTBACH FAMILY OF SEAWALL AND FEATHERSTONE (archived)
