= Olly Glover =

British politician

Councillor Olly Glover MP
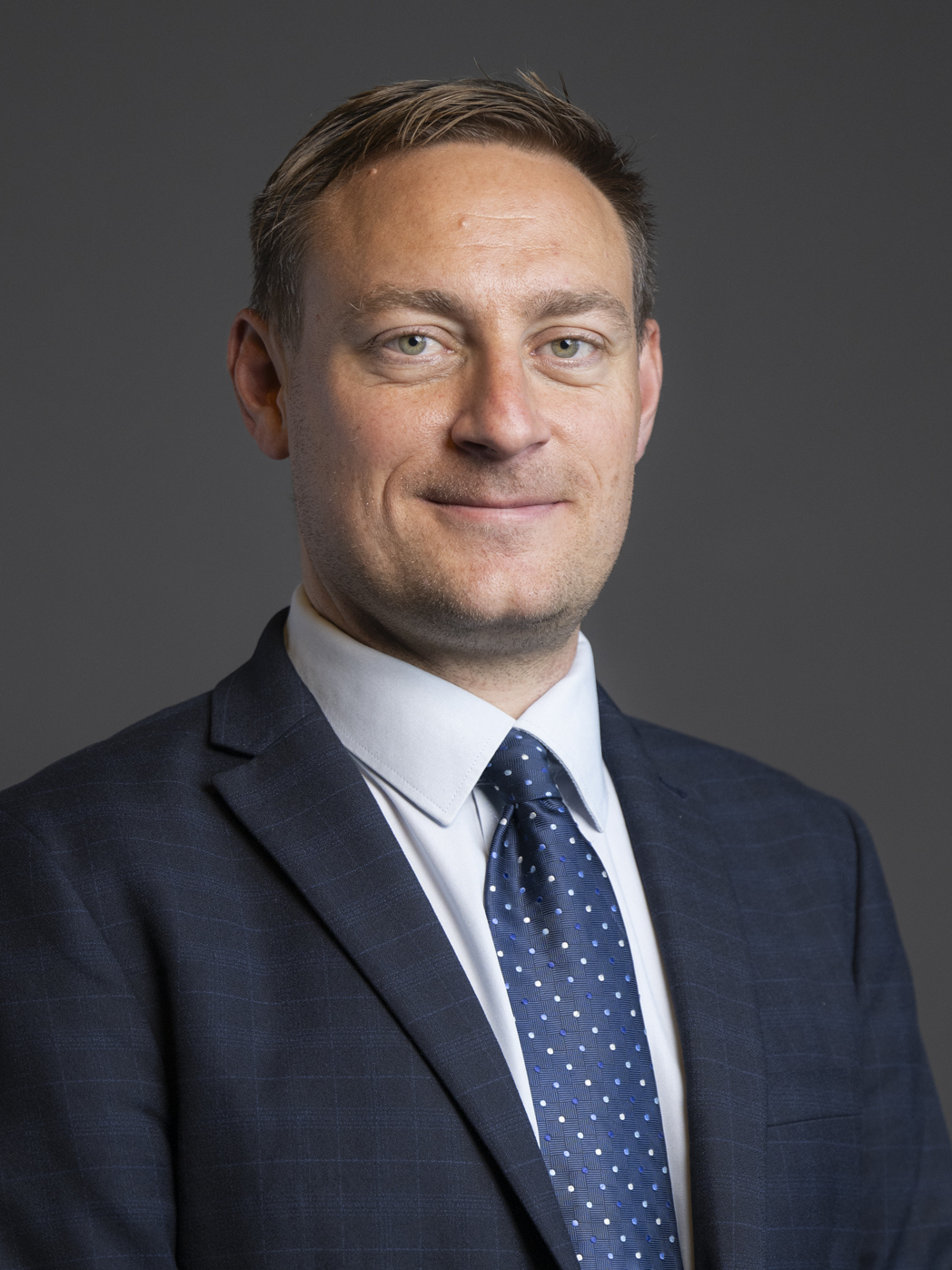
- Official portrait, 2024

Member of Parliament for Didcot and Wantage
- Incumbent
- Assumed office 4 July 2024
- Preceded by: Constituency created
- Majority: 6,233 (11.4%)

Liberal Democrat spokesperson for Transport
- Incumbent
- Assumed office 1 October 2025
- Leader: Ed Davey
- Preceded by: Paul Kohler

Personal details
- Born: Oliver Guy Nicholas Glover
- Party: Liberal Democrats
- Education: University of Cambridge

Oliver Guy Nicholas Glover is a British Liberal Democrat politician who has been Member of Parliament (MP) for Didcot and Wantage since 2024, elected with a 39.8% share of the vote for the newly created constituency. He is also a town and parish councillor in Oxfordshire. Glover has worked in operations management for various railway companies.

== Early life and education ==
Glover was educated at Hampton School and Fitzwilliam College, Cambridge, graduating with a BA in history. During his time at Cambridge, he was chairman of the Cambridge University Students Union (CUSU) LGBT group and junior treasurer of the Cambridge University Railway Club. He has worked in operations management for Network Rail and various train operating companies.

== Political career ==
Glover stood in the 2019 general election for the London constituency of Tooting, finishing in third place. In the 2023 local elections, Glover was elected to the town council of Didcot, South Oxfordshire, and the parish council of Milton, Vale of White Horse.

In the 2024 general election, Glover was elected as MP for the new constituency of Didcot and Wantage, with a 39.8% share of the vote and a majority of 6,233.

== Personal life ==
As of 2019, Glover lived in Balham, South London. He now lives in Milton. He is gay, and came out aged 15.

Parliament of the United Kingdom
| New constituency | Member of Parliament for Didcot and Wantage; 2024–present | Incumbent |
