= Featherstone, Staffordshire =

Village in Staffordshire, England

Coordinates: 52.64347°N 2.09349°W

Featherstone
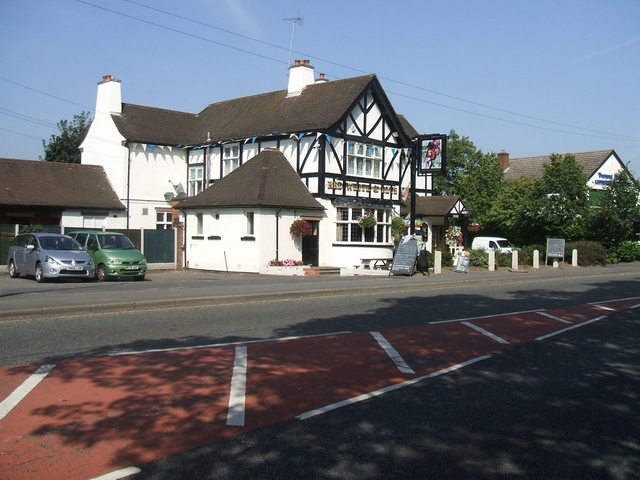
- Red, White and Blue public house

- Location within Staffordshire
- Population: 4,725 (2011 Census)
- OS grid reference: SJ937050
- District: South Staffordshire
- Shire county: Staffordshire
- Region: West Midlands
- Country: England
- Sovereign state: United Kingdom
- Post town: Wolverhampton
- Postcode district: WV10
- Police: Staffordshire
- Fire: Staffordshire
- Ambulance: West Midlands
- UK Parliament: Stone, Great Wyrley and Penkridge

Featherstone is a village in the district of South Staffordshire in Staffordshire England. It is near to the border with Wolverhampton.

== History ==
Originally a farming community consisting of a few scattered farms, it is mentioned in the Domesday Book of 1086 and was owned by the clergy of Wolverhampton Church. It is possible that the population numbers were fairly static until the opening of a new mine, Hilton Main, in the 1920s, it closed in 1969.

The Duke of Cleveland was lord of the manor of this small township of 550 acres and just 34 souls in 1851. This was once the residence of John Huntbach, the noted antiquary. The principal inhabitants were Joshua Price and Edward Tunycliffe, farmers, John Perry the lock manufacturer and Thomas Hill a vermin killer.

The village's population at the time of the 1851 census was 35. By 1921 this had risen to 39. By the time of the 2001 census it was 3,948.

== Today ==
The village has one primary school, Featherstone Academy.

Recently, controversy was sparked over the proposed building of 1,500 houses on green belt land, although many people believed the extra facilities proposed would make the village a better place to live. After much public opposition, this plan was rejected in early 2009.

Featherstone also has a Methodist church and some small shops. There are three off licences, a hairdresser and a chemist. In 2008 there was some concern over the future of the post office, but it was not one of those closed.

On the outskirts of the village are three prisons; HM Prison Featherstone, HM Prison Oakwood and HM Prison Brinsford, which is also a Youth Offender Institution (YOI).

Nearby is the site of the former Brinsford Lodge Teachers' Training College and Polytechnic Hall of Residence. The site of the old college, which stood near Oakwood Prison, is rich in history. There are traces of several old Second World War shelters and tiles from the kitchens.

=== Schools ===
Featherstone Academy, the Avenue (formerly Whitgreave Primary School)

=== Churches ===
Featherstone is part of the ecclesiastical Parish of Shareshill, where the Parish Church of St Mary & St Luke is situated.

There is a Methodist chapel sited at the junction of the Avenue and the A460.

=== Transport links ===
The village has a regular hourly bus service (service 70, Mon-Sat) to Wolverhampton and Cannock. The bus service is run by D&G Bus trading as Chaserider. In addition Select Bus service 67 runs three times daily Mon-Fri between Wolverhampton and Cannock via Wedge Mills and Bushbury. This latter service also serves Featherstone Prison.

The nearest active railway station to Featherstone is Landywood on the Chase Line and Wolverhampton on the West Coast Main Line.

=== Political representation ===
Featherstone has a parish council with two wards.

- Brinsford Ward, two councillors.
- Featherstone Ward, nine councillors.

Featherstone is represented in the House of Commons by Member of Parliament Gavin Williamson, Conservative member for South Staffordshire.

== Media ==
Local news and television programmes are provided by BBC West Midlands and ITV Central. Television signals are received from either the Wrekin or Sutton Coldfield TV transmitters.

Radio stations are served by BBC Radio WM, Heart West Midlands, Smooth West Midlands, Greatest Hits Radio Black Country & Shropshire, Hits Radio Black Country & Shropshire, and WCR FM, a community based station which broadcast from nearby Wolverhampton.

The town is served by the local newspaper, Express & Star.

== Notable people ==
- Andy Thompson (born 1967 in Featherstone) an English former footballer, played 533 professional games, of which 376 were for Wolverhampton Wanderers F.C.

== See also ==
- Listed buildings in Featherstone, Staffordshire
