= Winifred Tumim =

English charity administrator (1936–2009)

Winifred Tumim CBE
- Born: Winifred Letitia Borthwick; 3 June 1936; Wethersfield, Essex, England
- Died: 5 November 2009 (aged 73); Oxford, Oxfordshire, England
- Occupation: Charity administrator
- Years active: 1974–2009
- Spouse: Stephen Tumim (m. 1962; died 2003)
- Children: 3

Winifred Letitia Tumim, Lady Tumim CBE (née Borthwick; 3 June 1936 – 5 November 2009) was an English charity administrator and reform campaigner. As chairperson of the Royal National Institute for the Deaf (RNID) from 1985 to 1992, she led a reform of its management to create clear duties for all the staff. Tumim worked with the Charity Commission for England and Wales and the National Council for Voluntary Organisations (NCVO) to research attitude and performance in the charity world's wider managerial sector. She was chairperson of the NCVO between 1996 and 2001, writing a report advocating for the reform of charity law, which led the Blair ministry to pass the Charities Act 2006. After Tumim's death. the NCVO created an award in her name to reward an improvement in charity governance.

== Biography ==
=== Family background ===
Tumim's father, Algernon Malcolm Borthwick, was chairperson of the family-owned global meat-importing business, served in the Gordon Highlanders as a lieutenant-colonel in the Second World War, winning the Military Cross, and was unsuccessful in getting elected to the House of Commons as a Conservative Party MP in the 1945 United Kingdom general election. He was married to Edith Wylde (née Addison) and was a descendant of Scottish landowners from Midlothian; Tumim's great-grandfather Thomas Borthwick was appointed a peer but died before the issuing of letters patent in 1915. Tumim was born Winifred Letitia Borthwick at Wethersfield Place, Wethersfield, Braintree, Essex, on 3 June 1936 and grew up at the home. She was educated at North Foreland Lodge School. In 1955, Tumim enrolled at Lady Margaret Hall, Oxford, to read philosophy, politics and economics. She graduated in 1958. At the college, Tumim met Stephen Tumim, the barrister and future Her Majesty's Chief Inspector of Prisons, and the couple married on 1 February 1962. They had three daughters; the second was born profoundly deaf and the youngest lost her hearing while she was still an infant.

=== Career ===
Knowing two of their daughters were deaf, Tumim and her husband were devoted to learning about deafness and taking actions that would improve their livelihood, in an era where there were controversies over how deaf persons should be educated. In 1974, she became a governor at Mary Hare Grammar School for the Deaf in Newbury and was a member of the Warnock inquiry on the education of handicapped children four years later. In 1979, Tumim earned a diploma in linguistics at School of Oriental and African Studies in London. She stood as a Social Democratic Party parliamentary candidate for the Oxfordshire seat of Wantage in the 1983 United Kingdom general election and again in 1987 but came second in both elections. According to Tumim's obituarist in The Times, the experience of running for office proved to be "an important addition to her armoury for later campaigns."

From 1985 to 1992, she served as chairperson of the Royal National Institute for the Deaf (RNID). Tumim reorganised the management of the RNID to create a clear distinction of responsibilities of her job, the committee and its paid and volunteer staff. Having been attracted by this approach, the Charity Commission for England and Wales and the National Council for Voluntary Organisations (NCVO) invited her to lead a working party to look into the wider managerial sector in the charity world in 1992. Tumim focused mainly on trustees' attitude and performance and learnt two-thirds of interviewees did not know their legal and professional obligations. She called this state of management "mad chair disease" in a report emphasising the need to improve the appointment and education of trustees.

Tumim became chair of the NCVO in 1996 and left in 2001. In the role, she led the NCVO's campaign for reform of charity law, which she and others regarded as considerably out of date by four centuries. Tumim knew of a plethora of resistance to change in the charity and law worlds but concluded a revamp was needed. Her report was sent to the Blair ministry's strategy unit in 2002. which had considered change and agreed. Tumim's recommendations led to the passing of the Charities Act 2006, which introduced a definition of "public benefit" and revised public collection regulations. She was chair of the Forum on Children and Violence, which was formed after the 1993 Murder of James Bulger to campaign for investigations into what caused violence amongst children.

Between 1992 and 1999, Tumim was a trustee of the National Portrait Gallery, London, and was appointed chair of the Independent Advisory Group on Teenage Pregnancy in 2000, in an era where rates of teenage pregnancy in the United Kingdom were reportedly one of the worst in Western Europe. Recognising the need to take a more rational approach to teenage pregnancy, the group produced reports to promote awareness of it the and possible routes to lower the rates. This included Tumim visiting areas with high rates of teenage pregnancies to review the progress of the group's strategy on bettering childcare, education, employment and housing for adolescent parents while developing contraception and information services along with sex education programmes.

In December 2001, she was made chair of the Foyer Federation, a charity providing accommodation and support to homeless young persons. Tumim hosted the Sunday luncheons at St Edmund Hall, Oxford, in the Warden's Lodge, and joined the General Medical Council as an associate member, having been on its disciplinary committee from 1996 to 2003. Starting in 2008, she was the founding chairperson of the National Registers of Communication Professionals Working with Deaf and Deafblind People, became an ambassador for the health and education services charity for young people Brook, served as vice-president of the National Deaf Children's Society, and a member of the National Council of Voluntary Organisations and the Athenaeum Club, London.

== Personal life ==
In 1992, Tumim was awarded the OBE for her work with the RNID and the CBE in 2003. She suffered a heart attack and died at John Radcliffe Hospital in Oxford on 3 November 2009. On 24 March 2010, a memorial service was held for her at St Martin-in-the-Fields, Westminster.

== Legacy ==
Paul Levy of The Independent wrote Tumim was an effective campaigner through "her willingness to challenge authority". She is regarded by the media and the charity world as one who played a significant role in the voluntary sector in the prior two decades. In 2010, the NCVO established the Winifred Tumim Memorial Prize for best practice in charity governance, to commemorate her work with the body "to improve the quality of charity governance."
