= David Johnston (British politician) =

British Conservative politician (born 1981)

David Johnston OBE
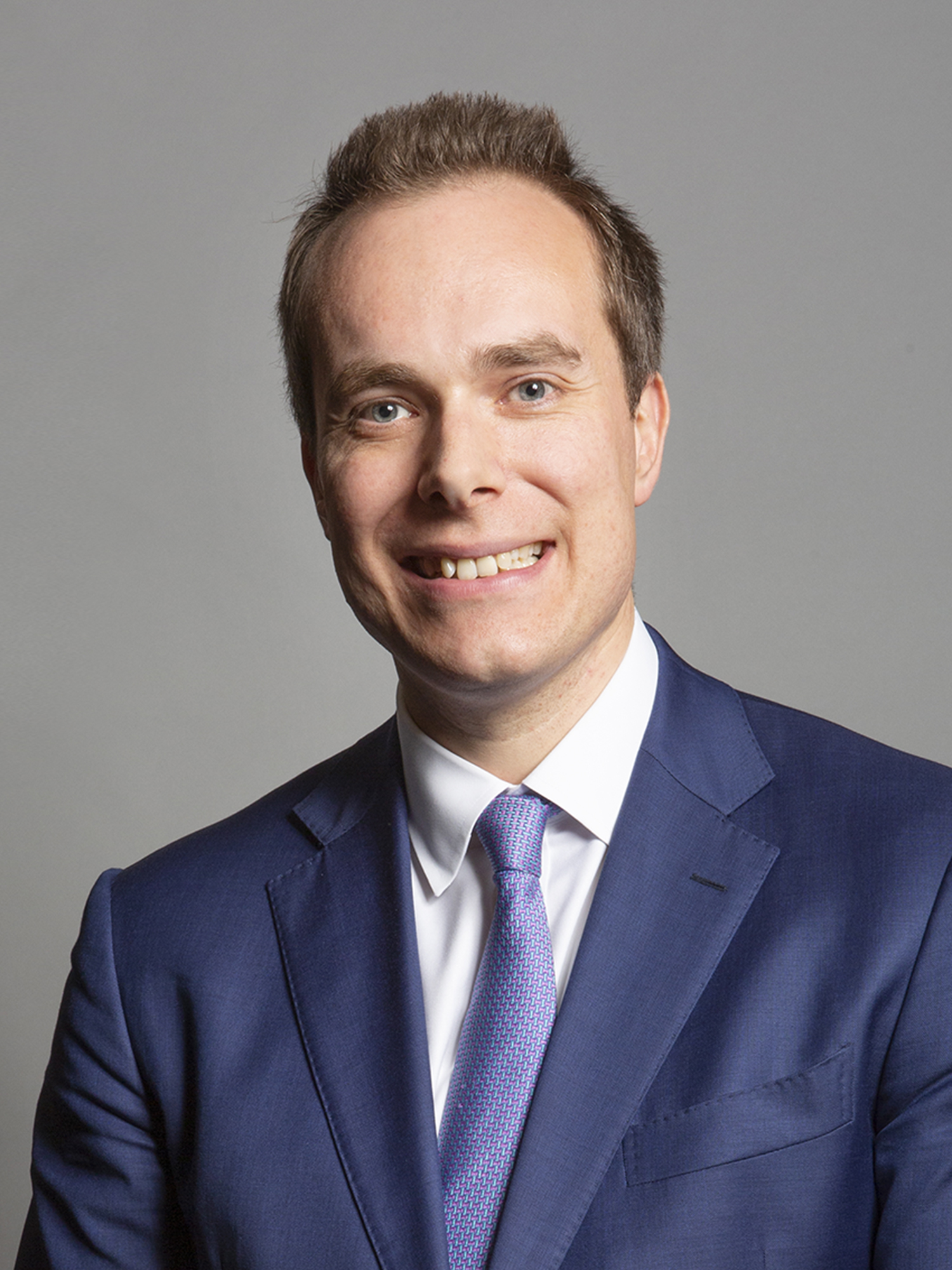
- Official portrait, 2019

Parliamentary Under-Secretary of State for Children, Families and Wellbeing
- In office 31 August 2023 – 5 July 2024
- Prime Minister: Rishi Sunak
- Preceded by: Claire Coutinho
- Succeeded by: Janet Daby

Member of Parliament for Wantage
- In office 12 December 2019 – 30 May 2024
- Preceded by: Ed Vaizey
- Succeeded by: Constituency abolished

Personal details
- Born: David Mervyn Johnston; 27 November 1981 (age 44) Whitechapel, London, England
- Party: Conservative
- Education: Balliol College, Oxford
- Website: www.david-johnston.org.uk

David Mervyn Johnston OBE (born 27 November 1981) is a British politician who served as Parliamentary Under-Secretary of State for Children, Families and Wellbeing from August 2023 to the general election of July 2024. A member of the Conservative Party, he was the Member of Parliament (MP) for Wantage from 2019 until 2024 when the seat was abolished.

On 6 July 2022, he resigned from his position as Parliamentary Private Secretary at the Department for Education amid the Chris Pincher scandal which led to Boris Johnson’s resignation as Prime Minister.

== Personal life and education ==
Johnston was born in Whitechapel, East London, to parents Mervyn and Carol Johnston. He attended Tom Hood Comprehensive School in Leytonstone and Sir George Monoux Sixth Form College, Walthamstow, before going on to university at Balliol College, Oxford, where he gained a BA in Modern History and Politics in 2003.

Johnston's partner is Charlotte Pickles. He lists his recreations as travel, the outdoors and the gym, in addition to being a Liverpool season ticket holder.

== Pre-parliamentary career ==
From 2003 to 2006, Johnston was co-ordinator of the Oxford Access Scheme. He then became a director of Future, holding his role from 2006 to 2009.

Before standing for election, he was chief executive of the Social Mobility Foundation for over ten years, from 2009 to 2020. He worked alongside his partner Charlotte Pickles during this time and they received tickets from the UK government to attend the opening ceremony of the 2012 Olympic Games together. He was also a member of the Social Mobility Commission from 2012 to 2017.

Johnston was a governor at Sir George Monoux Sixth Form College, where he had studied, from 2008 to 2016, as well as Pimlico Academy from 2008 to 2017.

== Parliamentary career ==
He was elected to Wantage, a safe seat for the Conservative Party in Oxfordshire, in 2019. He succeeded Ed Vaizey.

He served on the Education Select Committee between 2020 and 2021. In September 2021, he was appointed as Parliamentary Private Secretary at the Department for Education. Johnston resigned as PPS on 6 July 2022, following other resignations in protest of Boris Johnson's conduct in the Chris Pincher scandal.

On 31 August 2023 he was appointed Parliamentary Under-Secretary of State for Children, Families and Wellbeing, replacing Claire Coutinho.

With the abolition of the constituency of Wantage, in the 2024 United Kingdom general election Johnston stood for re-election in the newly created constituency Didcot and Wantage where he was the notional incumbent. With 28.4% of the vote share he came second to the Liberal Democrats candidate and consequently was not elected to parliament.

== Post-parliamentary career ==
Following his defeat at the 2024 UK General Election, Johnston founded the campaign group Conservative Networks, in order to "regain the support we lost, find a broader range of candidates to stand at elections or advise those who do".

Parliament of the United Kingdom
Preceded by Ed Vaizey	Member of Parliament for Wantage; 2019–2024	Succeeded by Constituency abolished
