= Didcot and Wantage =

UK Parliament constituency (since 2024)

- County constituency for the House of Commons
- Boundaries since 2024
- Boundary of Didcot and Wantage in South East England
- County: Oxfordshire
- Electorate: 74,356 (2023)
- Major settlements: Didcot, Wantage, Wallingford

Current constituency
- Created: 2024
- Member of Parliament: Olly Glover (Liberal Democrats)
- Seats: One
- Created from: Wantage

Didcot and Wantage is a constituency of the House of Commons in the UK Parliament. Further to the completion of the 2023 Periodic Review of Westminster constituencies, it was first contested at the 2024 general election. The seat was won by Olly Glover representing the Liberal Democrats.

The constituency is named for the towns of Didcot and Wantage in Oxfordshire.

== Constituency profile ==
Didcot and Wantage is a mostly rural constituency located in Oxfordshire (although traditionally in Berkshire). Its largest town is Didcot, which has a population of around 32,000. Other settlements in the constituency include the towns of Wantage and Wallingford and the large village of Grove. Didcot is an important railway town and Wantage and Wallingford are historic market towns. The Harwell Science and Innovation Campus is a significant local employer. The constituency is generally affluent with low levels of deprivation.

Residents of the constituency have high rates of education and professional employment, and household income is considerably higher than the national average. At the 2021 census, White people made up 92% of the population. Most of the constituency is represented by Liberal Democrats at the local council level, with some Labour Party councillors in Didcot and Greens in rural areas. An estimated 53% of voters in the constituency supported remaining in the European Union in the 2016 referendum compared to 48% nationwide.

== History ==
A campaign to change the name of the previous Wantage constituency to include 'Didcot' dates back to at least 2016.

== Boundaries ==
The constituency is composed of the following (as they existed on 1 December 2020):

- The District of South Oxfordshire wards of: Cholsey; Didcot North East; Didcot South; Didcot West; Sandford & the Wittenhams; Wallingford.
- The District of Vale of White Horse wards of: Blewbury & Harwell; Drayton; Grove North; Hendreds; Ridgeway; Stanford; Steventon & the Hanneys; Sutton Courtenay; Wantage & Grove Brook; Wantage Charlton.

It comprises the majority of the former Wantage constituency plus a small part of the former Henley electorate (Sandford-on-Thames):

== Members of Parliament ==
Wantage prior to 2024

Election	Member	Party
2024	Olly Glover	Liberal Democrats

== Elections ==
=== Elections in the 2020s ===
General election 2024: Didcot and Wantage
Party	Candidate	Votes	%	±%
Liberal Democrats	Olly Glover	21,793	39.8	+8.5
Conservative	David Johnston	15,560	28.4	−21.4
Labour	Mocky Khan	8,045	14.7	−1.3
Reform UK	Steve Beatty	6,400	11.7	N/A
Green	Sam Casey-Rerhaye	2,693	4.9	+4.2
SDP	Kyn Pomlett	242	0.4	N/A
Majority		6,233	11.4	N/A
Turnout		54,733	67.8	−5.3
Registered electors		80,689		
Liberal Democrats gain from Conservative		Swing	+15.0	

=== Elections in the 2010s ===
2019 notional result
Party	Vote	%
Conservative	27,045	49.8
Liberal Democrats	17,022	31.3
Labour	8,708	16.0
Others	1,201	2.2
Green	370	0.7
Turnout	54,346	73.1
Registered electors	74,356	

== See also ==
- List of parliamentary constituencies in Oxfordshire
- List of parliamentary constituencies in the South East England (region)
