= HM Inspectorate of Probation =

Statutory body in England and Wales

Agency overview
- Formed: 1936; 90 years ago
- Type: Statutory inspectorate
- Jurisdiction: England and Wales
- Headquarters: Manchester Civil Justice Centre, Manchester; 53°29′06″N 2°15′19″W
- Employees: c. 65 (2019)
- Agency executive: Martin Jones, Chief Inspector
- Key document: Criminal Justice and Court Services Act 2000
- Website: hmiprobation.justiceinspectorates.gov.uk

His Majesty's Inspectorate of Probation (HMIP) is a statutory body and independent inspectorate in England and Wales, funded by the Ministry of Justice, formed in 1936. It constitutes one of the 5 inspectorates of the criminal justice system of England & Wales, with the others being His Majesty's Crown Prosecution Service Inspectorate, His Majesty's Inspectorate of Prisons for England & Wales, His Majesty's Inspectorate of Constabulary and Fire & Rescue Services, and the Criminal Justice Joint Inspectorate.

== Role and functions ==
HMIP reports to the Secretary of State for Justice on the effectiveness of the arrangements for and discharge of work done on individual offenders to reduce their likelihood of offending or risk of serious harm. Historically, HMIP has inspected the work of the National Probation Service and from 2003 Youth Offending Teams, but since the Offender Management Act 2007 it has a brief to supervise more widely to reflect new arrangements by which probation services could be provided by other bodies.

HMIP also works to improve the performance of probation organisations by providing a range of advice; and to provide advice on good practice to ministers, officials, managers and practitioners.

Much of the work of the Inspectorate is concerned with the production of inspection reports of two sorts: inspections of individual probation providers; and thematic reports on the handling of aspects of probation work such as race equality, or drug treatment orders. The inspectorate has also published several reports on effective and evidence-based practice.

== History ==
The Probation of Offenders Act 1907 granted the Magistrates’ Courts the power to appoint probation officers.

A Departmental Committee to examine to role of social services in courts of summary jurisdiction was set up in 1934. When it reported in 1936 the first HM Inspector of Probation was appointed.

In earlier years the inspectorate was greatly concerned with the development of probation services in the UK, including the training of suitable staff, the organisation of probation areas, the creation of supervisory posts, and the accreditation of holders of those posts. As probation boards and areas matured, some HMIP functions such as training and accreditation were ceded to areas or other providers, and increased emphasis was put on inspection and the making of recommendations for improvement.

The Inspectorate existed as a Home Office function until placed on a statutory footing by the Criminal Justice Act 1991. The Inspectorate was hosted and funded by the Home Office until 2007, when its funding and hosting was moved to the new Ministry of Justice.

The role of HMIP has changed over its history to meet the needs of the time.

In 2014, HMIP had a staff of around 35 inspectors and 15 support staff and a budget of circa £3.5M.

== Chief Inspectors of Probation ==
- 1936-1949 No Chief Inspector
- 1949-1972 Finlay MacRae (title of Principal Probation Inspector)
- 1972-1980 Mike Hogan
- 1980-1985 Roy Taylor
- 1985-1988 Cliff Swann
- 1988-1992 Colin Thomas
- 1992-2001 Sir Graham Smith
- 2001-2004 Professor Rod Morgan
- 2004-2011 Andrew Bridges
- 2011-2014 Liz Calderbank (interim)
- 2014-2015 Paul McDowell
- 2015-2016 Paul Wilson (interim)
- 2016-2019 Dame Glenys Stacey
- 2019-2023 Justin Russell
- 2023-2024 Sue McAllister (interim)
- 2024- Martin Jones

== See also ==
- HM Chief Inspector of Prisons
- HM Inspectorate of Prisons for Scotland
- HM Prison and Probation Service
