= David Ramsbotham, Baron Ramsbotham =

British Army general (1934–2022)

General The Right Honourable The Lord Ramsbotham GCB CBE
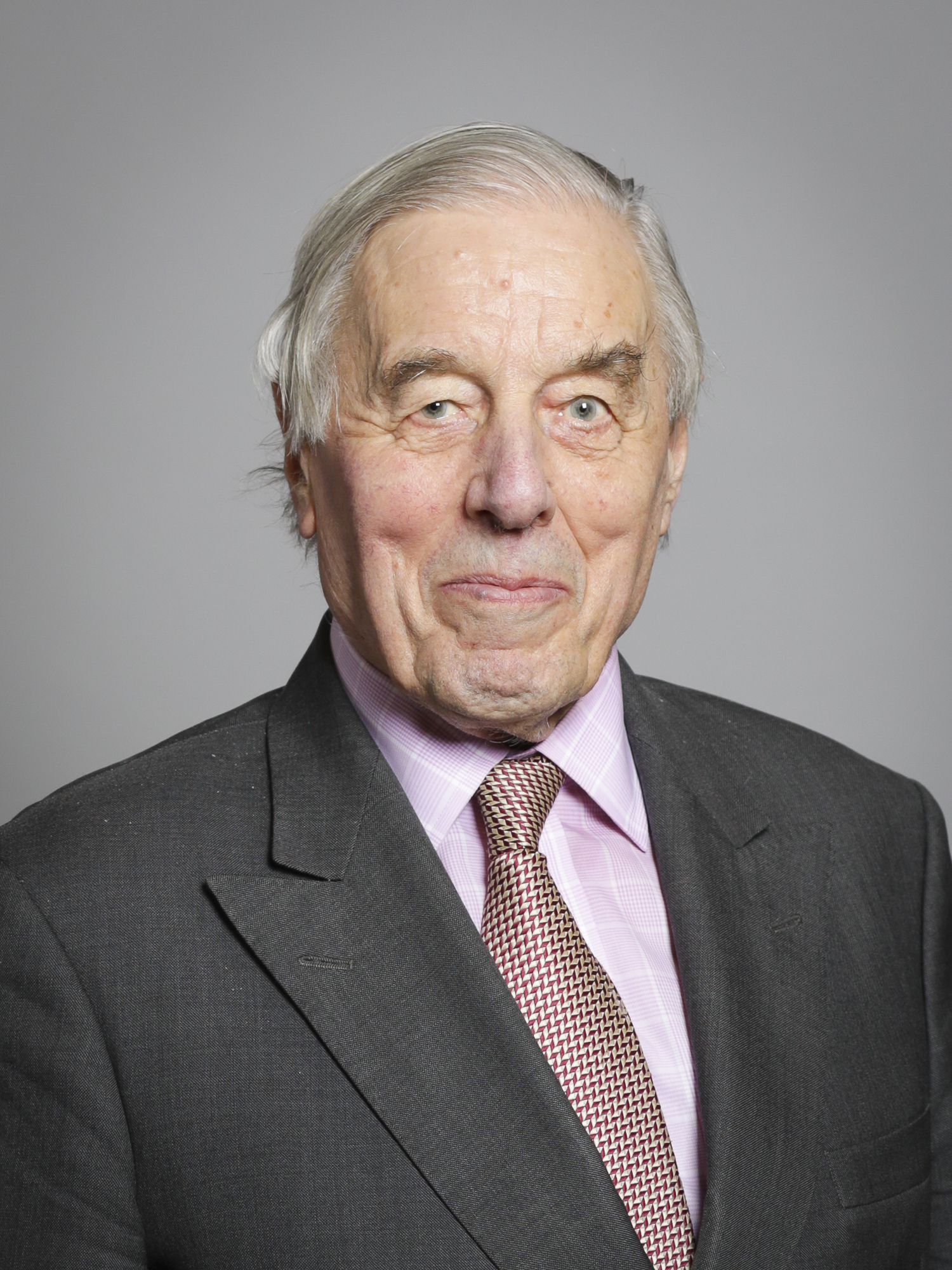
- Official portrait, 2019
- Born: 6 November 1934; Wells, Somerset, England
- Died: 13 December 2022 (aged 88); Paddington, London, England
- Relatives: John Ramsbotham (father)
- Military career
- Allegiance: United Kingdom
- Branch: British Army
- Service years: 1953–1993
- Rank: General
- Service number: 427439
- Units: Royal Artillery; Rifle Brigade; Royal Green Jackets
- Commands: 3rd Armoured Division; Field Army
- Conflicts: Indonesia–Malaysia confrontation; Northern Ireland
- Awards: Knight Grand Cross of the Order of the Bath; Commander of the Order of the British Empire; Mentioned in Despatches
- Other work: HM Chief Inspector of Prisons

Member of the House of Lords
- Lord Temporal
- Life peerage 17 May 2005 – 13 December 2022

Personal details
- Party: Crossbencher

General David John Ramsbotham, Baron Ramsbotham (6 November 1934 – 13 December 2022) was a British Army officer who later served as HM Chief Inspector of Prisons. He was awarded a life peerage in 2005 and later sat on the crossbenches of the House of Lords.

== Early life and military career ==
Ramsbotham was born at a nursing home in Wells, Somerset, on 6 November 1934, the son of a Church of England clergyman, later Bishop of Wakefield, John Alexander Ramsbotham, son of Rev. Alexander Ramsbotham. He was educated at Haileybury and Imperial Service College. Ramsbotham entered the army through National Service, and was commissioned as a second lieutenant in the Royal Artillery on 14 March 1953. He completed his National Service as an acting lieutenant, and retained a Territorial Army commission. He then took a history degree at Corpus Christi College, Cambridge.

On 21 February 1958 he was appointed to a regular army commission as a lieutenant, with seniority from 31 January 1957. He was promoted to captain on 31 January 1961. He served in Borneo during the Indonesia–Malaysia confrontation as an acting major in the period 24 December 1965 to 23 June 1966, and was Mentioned in Despatches. He was promoted to substantive major on 31 December 1967, and to lieutenant-colonel on 30 June 1971. From 11 June 1970 to 20 June 1973 he served as Military Assistant to the Chief of the General Staff, Sir Michael Carver. This was a particularly busy time for the British Army; the Troubles in Northern Ireland were beginning, and the army's contribution, Operation Banner, was taking an increasingly large proportion of resources.

For his performance in this role, Ramsbotham was appointed an Officer of the Order of the British Empire (OBE) in the 1974 New Year Honours. He later commanded a battalion of the Royal Green Jackets in Northern Ireland from 1974 to 1975.

Ramsbotham was elevated to colonel on 30 June 1976, and brigadier on 31 December 1978 (with seniority from 30 June 1978). He then served in Northern Ireland, commanding a brigade based in Belfast, and was appointed Commander of the Order of the British Empire (CBE) for his service there in the operational honours of 21 October 1980. His career was almost derailed when as the army's director of public relations (a position he held from 1982 to 1984) he leaked documents to a journalist which showed that prior to the Falklands War the army had developed a comprehensive plan for dealing with the media, but it had been overlooked; and the army was subsequently criticised for not having done such planning. He was then promoted to major-general and commanded 3rd Armoured Division for a period prior to 13 March 1987. On 1 January 1987 he was appointed to the honorary position of Colonel Commandant, 2nd Battalion, Royal Green Jackets, in succession to Sir Frank Kitson, which he held until 25 July 1992. On 15 April 1987 he was promoted to lieutenant-general and appointed Commander UK Field Army and Inspector General of the Territorial Army. He was appointed a Knight Commander of the Order of the Bath (KCB) in the 1987 Queen's Birthday Honours, and a further honorary appointment as Honorary Colonel of the Officer Training Corps at the University of Cambridge on 1 July, which he held until 1 May 1993. He stepped down as Commander of the Field Army on 13 August 1990, and received a further honorary appointment as Aide de Camp General to HM the Queen (ADC Gen) on 3 December 1990, which he held until his retirement from the army. On 27 December 1990 he was appointed Adjutant-General (AG), with the local rank of general, and he received substantive promotion to that rank on 24 January 1990 (with seniority from 1 September 1990). This period included the United Kingdom's involvement in the Gulf War. He was promoted to Knight Grand Cross of the Order of the Bath (GCB) in the 1993 New Year Honours. He stepped down as AG on 17 May 1993, and retired from the army on 13 July 1993.

== Chief Inspector of Prisons ==
Ramsbotham was HM Chief Inspector of Prisons for England and Wales from 1 December 1995 to 2001 when he was succeeded by Anne Owers CBE. As Chief Inspector of Prisons, he had a, at times, strained relationship with Home Secretaries Michael Howard and Jack Straw, and this contributed to his contract not being continued for the full eight years that had originally been possible (an initial period of five years, with extension for a further three years possible).

== Later activities ==
On 22 March 2005, it was announced that Ramsbotham was to be elevated to a life peerage. The title was gazetted as Baron Ramsbotham, of Kensington in the Royal Borough of Kensington and Chelsea, on 17 May. He sat in the House of Lords as a crossbench peer. He was Chairman of the Koestler Awards scheme, and vice-chair of both the All Party Penal Affairs Group and the All Party Parliamentary Group for Learning & Skills in the Criminal Justice System. He was President of UNLOCK, The National Association of Ex-Offenders and an Ambassador for the charity, the Prison Advice and Care Trust (pact). He was also a trustee and vice-chairman of the Institute for Food, Brain and Behaviour and a Patron of Prisoners' Advice Service (PAS).

Ramsbotham was elected an honorary Fellow of Corpus Christi College, Cambridge in 2001, and served on the advisory board of the International Centre for Prison Studies at King's College London. He was also a Patron of Prisoners Abroad, a charity that supports the welfare of Britons imprisoned overseas and their families, Prisoners Education Trust, a charity that supports serving prisoners through a range of academic, creative and vocational distance learning courses whilst inside and Prisoners' Advice Service, a charity which offers free legal advice and support to adult prisoners throughout England and Wales regarding their human and legal rights, conditions of imprisonment and the application of Prison Law and the Prison Rules. He was also a Patron of the African Prisons Project, an international non-governmental organisation with a mission to bring dignity and hope to men women and children in African prisons through health, education, justice and reintegration. He was President of the charity PTSD Resolution, Charity number 1133188, providing treatment to Veterans with post traumatic stress through its UK-wide network of 200 therapists.

Ramsbotham wrote extensively on matters relating to prisons and the military, in particular his 2003 book Prisongate: The Shocking State of Britain's Prisons and the Need for Visionary Change set out his vision for reform of the prison system.

== Personal life and death ==
In 1958, he married Susan Caroline Dickinson (1938–2021), and had two sons, James and Richard. Ramsbotham died after a fall at St Mary's Hospital in Paddington, London, on 13 December 2022, aged 88.

Ramsbotham was a patron to the Zahid Mubarek Trust from 2007 and was also a patron of the charity SkillForce.

== Arms ==
Coat of arms of David Ramsbotham, Baron Ramsbotham

Crest
Issuant from a coronet Or a ram's head Argent armed Or holding in the mouth a wild garlic flower Proper.
Escutcheon
Per fess Gules and Vert (the shade thereof being known as rifle green) in chief a pelican in her piety Argent vulning herself Gules and in base a bugle horn stringed also Argent.
Supporters
On either side a ram that on the dexter Gules and that on the sinister Vert each armed unguled and supporting with the interior hind foot a portcullis Or.
Motto
Non Vi Sed Virtute

Military offices
Preceded by Antony Walker	General Officer Commanding the 3rd Armoured Division; 1984–1987	Succeeded by Edward Jones
Preceded by Sir John Akehurst	Commander UK Field Army; 1987–1990	Succeeded by Sir Michael Wilkes
Preceded by Sir Robert Pascoe	Adjutant General; 1990–1993	Succeeded by Sir Michael Wilkes
Government offices
Preceded by Stephen Tumim	Her Majesty's Chief Inspector of Prisons; 1995–2001	Succeeded by Anne Owers
