= Bobby Cummines =

English reformed criminal (1951–2026)

Bobby Cummines OBE FRSA
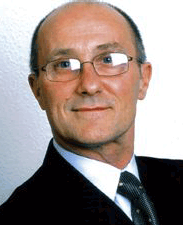
- Born: Robert Cummines; 23 November 1951; Islington, London, England
- Died: 5 March 2026 (aged 74); Brentwood, Essex, England
- Known for: Executive at Unlock, reformed criminal
- Children: 2

Robert Cummines OBE FRSA (23 November 1951 – 5 March 2026) was an English rehabilitated business crime leader, protection racketeer, armed robber and criminal enforcer who was chief executive of Unlock, The National Association of Reformed Offenders from April 1999 until March 2012. Despite being described as a gangster in some of the media, Cummines refused the label, saying he never considered himself one, instead stating he was a "businessman whose business was crime".

== Early life ==
Robert Cummines was born in Islington, London, the youngest of eight children. His father was a builder.

He described the moment he decided to get into crime, saying as he was walking through Finsbury Park, he noticed two individuals he had previous encounters with and two police officers allegedly mistreated the two during interrogations, which led Cummines to speak up, saying that as the two involved were minors, an adult had to be present during questioning. According to Cummines, the two officers then left for a short period and returned with a straight razor which they threw on the ground in front of him, and said that they would arrest him as well for possession of the blade. He was told that if he pleaded guilty to the possession charge, he would only have to pay a 10-shilling fine, whereas if he chose to proceed to a trial, he would likely be convicted and sentenced to time in a borstal. He pleaded guilty and paid the fine.

Upon returning to his place of work (a shipping office), where his employers had read about the guilty plea in the newspaper, he was dismissed. Cummines said that with a criminal record, it was incredibly difficult to find another job, and so thought "if you're gonna make me a bad guy, I'll show you how bad I can be."

== Career ==
Cummines began a criminal career at the age of 16, beating up those who owed associates money, but quickly moved on, becoming Britain's youngest armed robber. He expanded into leading a group of criminal enforcers, extortionists and racketeers known as "The Chaps", employing extreme violence in 1970s North London with his fearsome reputation and a sawn-off double-barrel shotgun named "Kennedy" after John F. Kennedy. He also used a brutal method common in the underworld, filling his shotgun with rock salt instead of buckshot–doing less damage but causing serious pain and removing any forensic evidence. Cummines claims he was taught to dehumanize anyone he killed, to think of them as vermin, saying that if you did think about it then you would think of their families and guilt. He did, however, feel sorry for one death; a hostage in a routine bank heist died due to suffering a serious panic attack, where he vomited and choked on a gag.

He was sentenced to 18 years when an arms dealer (referred to as "Ernie" in his autobiography) informed and told the authorities almost everything Cummines and his gang had done. Ernie worked with the police to entrap Cummines, telling him he had an Uzi sub-machine gun for sale, allowing multiple armed police to ambush and arrest him. He went to prison and within the first few months he had taken a governor hostage for being "unreasonable". This led authorities to designate him as a class "A" prisoner, causing him to be frequently moved from one prison to another. In his autobiography, Cummines details how he met a broad range of people, from members of the Irish Republican Army to American gangsters.

Cummines turned his life around in prison after a conversation with Charlie Richardson, who urged him to become educated and earn money without hurting anyone. He began writing poetry and got into contact with Labour MP Tony Benn who was willing to help him and contributed a foreword to his published poems, as well as changing rules so that the aim of prisons was stated to be to "rehabilitate and educate" rather than the free-for-all ethos that Cummines had experienced.

He criticised the system of high-security prisons, which places many brilliant criminal minds in one location and thus enables them to teach each other tricks and establish connections. He said that if he had not wanted to escape criminal life he would have used these techniques, such as building bombs or smuggling illicit goods. He then studied for a degree with the Open University whilst in prison.

Queen Elizabeth II awarded Cummines the OBE in June 2011 in recognition of his services to reformed offenders.

His autobiography, I Am Not a Gangster, was published 15 May 2014 by Random House's Ebury Press imprint.

== Death ==
Cummines died in hospital on 5 March 2026, at the age of 74, after being hit by a car in Warley, Brentwood.
