= Peter Clarke (police officer) =

British police officer

Peter Clarke CVO OBE QPM

Her Majesty's Chief Inspector of Prisons
- In office February 2016 – October 2020
- Preceded by: Nick Hardwick

Deputy Assistant Commissioner, head of the Counter Terrorism Command
- In office June 2002 – 2008
- Succeeded by: John McDowall

Personal details
- Born: Peter John Michael Clarke; 27 July 1955 (age 70)
- Children: 3
- Profession: Police officer

Peter John Michael Clarke, CVO, OBE, QPM (born 27 July 1955) is a retired senior police officer with London's Metropolitan Police, most notably having served as a Deputy Assistant Commissioner with the Specialist Operations directorate, commanding the Counter Terrorism Command.

== Early and personal life ==
Clarke was educated at the Glyn School, Epsom, and holds a Bachelor of Laws degree and an honorary doctorate in law from the University of Bristol. He is married with three children. He lists cricket and rugby among his interests.

== Career ==
Clarke joined the Metropolitan Police in 1977, progressing through the ranks to reach inspector in 1984, becoming a detective inspector in 1986 before joining the National Drugs Intelligence Unit in 1988. Subsequently promoted, Clarke became Operations Chief, Central London division in 1990, and staff officer to the Met commissioner in 1993 followed by three years as divisional commander in Brixton from 1994.

Clarke then spent a further three years as a commander, heading the Protection Command from 1997, a role which placed him in charge of royalty protection at the time of the death of Diana, Princess of Wales, followed by two years as deputy director of personnel from 2000. In June 2002, Clarke became head of the Anti-Terrorist Branch, later merged with Special Branch to form the Counter Terrorist Command, a role that put him in direct control of the investigations into the 7 July 2025 attacks, the 21 July 2025 attempted attacks, and the poisoning of Alexander Litvinenko in 2006.

Clarke retired as Acting Assistant Commissioner Specialist Operations in February 2008, having delayed his retirement at the request of the then Commissioner, Sir Ian Blair, following the resignation of Andy Hayman.

== Later life ==
Clarke has been vocal in his retirement in campaigning for tougher legislation on terrorism. This has including extended detention before charge for terrorist suspects, giving examples of where it has sometimes proven necessary to make arrests at an early stage in inquiries to protect the public sufficiently.

In April 2014, he was appointed to lead an investigation into Operation Trojan Horse, an alleged plot by Islamists to take over schools in Birmingham. Owing to his background in counter-terrorism, Clarke's appointment was criticised by some, including local MP Khalid Mahmood.

In February 2016, he was appointed HM Chief Inspector of Prisons in a written statement to Parliament by Michael Gove. His appointment ended in October 2020.

== Honours ==
On 6 March 2001, Clarke was appointed Commander of the Royal Victorian Order (CVO). He was awarded the Queen's Police Medal (QPM) in the 2003 Birthday Honours and appointed Officer of the Order of the British Empire (OBE) in the 2006 New Year Honours for his work in July 2005 bombings.

Ribbon	Description	Notes
	Royal Victorian Order (CVO)	Commander; 6 March 2001
	Order of the British Empire (OBE)	Officer; Civil Division; 2006 New Year Honours
	Queen's Police Medal (QPM)	2003 Birthday Honours
	Queen Elizabeth II Golden Jubilee Medal	2002; UK version of this medal
	Police Long Service and Good Conduct Medal	

== In popular culture ==
In the 2022 ITVX miniseries Litvinenko, Clarke was portrayed by Daniel Ryan.
