= HM Prison Brinsford =

Prison near Wolverhampton, England

HMP Brinsford
- Interactive map of HMP Brinsford
- Location: Featherstone, Staffordshire; 52°38′49″N 2°06′36″W
- Security class: Juveniles/Young offenders
- Population: 470 (21 June 2017)
- Opened: 1991
- Managed by: HM Prison Services
- Governor: Darren Hudson
- Website: Brinsford at justice.gov.uk

HMP & YOI Prison Brinsford is an adult male Category B & C prison and Young Offenders Institution (YOI), located in the village of Featherstone (near Wolverhampton), in Staffordshire, England. The prison is operated by His Majesty's Prison Service.

== History ==
Brinsford was opened in 1991 as a YOI and Remand Centre. The site had been previously acquired from the Ministry of Defence, and already housed Featherstone Prison.

In 2001, Brinsford was branded a disgrace after an inspection found the prison's regime to be negligent and lacking in understanding towards prisoners, with large indicators of self harm, fear of safety and bullying at the prison. A year later two additional education blocks were built at Brinsford, with the regime promising a renewed focus on education and training at the site.

In 2003, four prisoners escaped from Brinsford after assaulting a prison officer and stealing his keys to an administration block. The four inmates then smashed a window and escaped over the prison's perimeter wall.

In 2008, an additional residential unit and activity centre were built at Brinsford. This resulted in a reduction of places for Juveniles, and an increase in places for Young Offenders at the prison.

In 2016, it was in the process of changing to a Category C male prison.

Since the beginning of 2019, it became a Category B & C male prison, mainly due to the rise in violence, self-harm and drug abuse, it has been named as one of the worst prisons in the United Kingdom.

== The prison today ==
Brinsford holds young offenders and adults (those aged over 18). Accommodation at the prison comprises five Residential Units:

- Unit 1 – supported living unit for those prisoners with mental health or complex needs
- Unit 2 – for men attending work
- Unit 3 – for induction to the prison
- Unit 4 – a healthy living unit
- Unit 5 – for those men reaching an enhanced level of behaviour within the systems.

All cells have integral sanitation, television and electricity, while cells in Unit 5 also have showers.

Education at the prison is provided by Milton Keynes College and courses offered include: Literacy and Numeracy; Social & Life Skills; Communication & Application of Number; ESOL; Practical Crafts; Visual Art; Cookery; Information Technology; Painting and Decorating; Woodwork; Horticulture; Cleaning Science; Physical Education; and Music.

Other facilities at the prison include a gym and sports pitches, Chaplaincy service, Job Centre, PIN telephones, Legal Services, Incentives and Earned Privileges schemes, Connexions and the Samaritans.

== Inspections ==
A November 2013 inspection of HMYOI Brinsford found that the situation at the institution had not improved since the previous inspection in 2012. The Chief Inspector of Prisons stated that Brinsford had "the worst overall findings my inspectorate has identified in a single prison during my tenure as Chief Inspector". The report found that the prison failed at inducting new inmates to the regime, that the level of violence was "too high", that a quarter of inmates surveyed said that it was easy to get drugs into prison. The report also found that many cells were "squalid" in condition and that communal areas were "dirty and in need of refurbishment".

The inspectorate found that just under a third of the inmates were not engaged with either work or education programmes. Overall, they found that the institution required "significant improvement" and that while staff were aware of the problems raised, they were "overwhelmed" and unable to improve the situation.
