= Stephen Tumim =

English jurist and Chief Inspector of Prisons

Sir Stephen Tumim (15 August 1930 – 8 December 2003) was an English jurist, and Her Majesty's Chief Inspector of Prisons from 1987 to 1995.

Tumim was the son of a barrister, and was educated at St Edward's School, Oxford and Worcester College, Oxford. In 1978 he became a Circuit judge.

Appointed as Her Majesty's Chief Inspector of Prisons by Douglas Hurd, Tumim soon made a reputation as a critic of the existing system. He campaigned successfully for an end to slopping out, and was also critical of the "enforced idleness" of prisoners, and poor mental health care. He served under successive Conservative Home Secretaries (not all of them sympathetic to his views), until Michael Howard declined to renew his contract in 1995, and Sir David Ramsbotham was appointed. He was knighted soon afterwards, served on many charitable trusts, and continued to inspect prisons overseas. He was the founding President of UNLOCK, The National Association of Ex-Offenders. Between 1996 and 1998 he was principal of St Edmund Hall, Oxford, leaving amidst some controversy (he was popular with students, less so with academic colleagues). He was High Steward for Wallingford from 1995 to 2001. Tumim was named "Oldie of the Year" in 1994 by The Oldie magazine.

Tumim was on the committee and a buyer for the Contemporary Art Society. Between 1990 and 2003 he was President of the Royal Literary Fund.

He was married to Winifred Tumim CBE née Borthwick (1936–2009) and had three daughters.

== Publications ==
- Great Legal Disasters, Barker, London, 1983. ISBN 021316874X
- Great Legal Fiascos, Weidenfeld & Nicolson, London, 1985. ISBN 0213169274
- Crime and Punishment, Phoenix, London, 1997. ISBN 0297819372

Government offices
Preceded by James Hennessy	Her Majesty's Chief Inspector of Prisons; 1987–1995	Succeeded by David Ramsbotham
