= HM Prison Featherstone =

Men's prison in Featherstone, England

Coordinates: 52.6499°N 2.1117°W

HMP Featherstone
- Interactive map of HMP Featherstone
- Location: Featherstone, Staffordshire
- Security class: Adult Male/Category C
- Population: 702 (December 2015)
- Managed by: HM Prison Services
- Governor: Rebecca Wyatt
- Website: Featherstone at justice.gov.uk

HM Prison Featherstone is a Category C men's prison, located in the village of Featherstone (near Wolverhampton), in Staffordshire, England. The prison is operated by His Majesty's Prison Service.

== History ==
Featherstone Prison was constructed on property previously owned by the Ministry of Defence.

In the early 1980 inmates of the prison were found to be making forgeries of the work of Bernard Leach.

Brinsford Prison was opened on the same site, adjacent to Featherstone in 1991.

In a 2001 study by the Prison Reform Trust, Featherstone Prison was revealed to have the highest number of drug-using prisoners in the UK. 34% of all inmates in the jail admitted to taking drugs. A year later it was revealed that inmates were brewing their own beer using Marmite, with fruit and vegetables also being used to make alcoholic drinks. However the governor of the day Mike Pasco stated that, while not condoning the practice, he found it preferable to the inmates smuggling hard drugs into the prison.

In 2004, a report by Her Majesty's Chief Inspector of Prisons stated that the drug problems at Featherstone had been "turned around", and that the prison "was largely calm and efficient with little bullying". However the report also warned that improvements had not been made without a cost, as the new emphasis on security "pervaded the life" of the prison, creating an "over-controlled" environment.

In 2006 another report by the Chief Inspector criticised Featherstone Prison for its overcrowding and poor environment, "with poorly-managed strip searches and too many prisoners being locked in cells during the day."

In 2007 a government study found that Featherstone Prison had the highest percentage of inmates in the UK testing positive for opiates such as heroin. During the study, prisoners were randomly tested throughout the UK over a three-month period, and 16.7% of the inmates tested at Featherstone had been taking opiates.

== The prison today ==
An adult Category C Closed Training prison, Featherstone Prison has single and double cells. The prison offers education, workshops, Physical Education, Enhanced Thinking Skills programmes, Welfare to Work programmes, a Job Club, community projects and a Listeners Scheme to its prisoners, who are required to work as directed by the Labour Board.

There is a Visitors Centre outside the prison which has toilets, refreshments and children's play area.

== Notable former inmates ==
- Lee Hughes, former West Bromwich Albion striker.
