= Marina Vaizey =

Anglo-American art critic, broadcaster, exhibition curator, author and journalist

The Right Honourable The Lady Vaizey CBE
- Born: Marina Alandra Stansky; January 16, 1938 (age 88); New York City, New York, U.S.
- Education: Harvard University (BA); Girton College, Cambridge (BA)
- Spouse: John Vaizey (m. 1961; died 1984)
- Children: Ed

Marina Alandra Vaizey, Baroness Vaizey, CBE (née Stansky; born 16 January 1938) is an Anglo-American art critic, broadcaster, exhibition curator, author and journalist based in the UK.

She was born in New York City, daughter of Lyman Stansky, an American lawyer. She was educated at the Brearley School, Putney School, Radcliffe College of Harvard University with a bachelor's in medieval history and literature in 1959, and Girton College, Cambridge for a second bachelor's in history (later promoted to a master's per tradition). She moved to Britain in 1959. In 1961, she married the economist John Vaizey, Lord Vaizey, who died in 1984. One of their sons is Ed Vaizey, British media columnist and Member of Parliament who served as UK Minister for Culture and the Digital Economy from 2010 to 2016.

She was formerly Art Critic for the Financial Times and Sunday Times and editor of the Art Quarterly and Review. She has written several books on art. She now lectures including at the National Gallery and British Museum. She was a founding Trustee of both the Geffrye Museum and National Museums Liverpool and has also been a trustee of the Imperial War Museum and the South Bank. She is a current trustee of ACE Foundation. She has also been a judge for the Turner Prize.

She was appointed Commander of the Order of the British Empire (CBE) in the 2009 New Year Honours.

== Works ==
- John Golding, Paintings and Drawings, Kettle's Yard Gallery, Cambridge (1975).
- The St. Michael’s Guide to Famous Paintings, Marks & Spencer Ltd (1979)
- Andrew Wyeth, Royal Academy of Arts (1980).
- The Artist as a Photographer, Sidgwick and Jackson, Sep. (1982). ISBN 9780283987397
- Peter Blake London: Weidenfeld & Nicolson, Chicago: Academy Publishers (1986). ISBN 0297787357
- Steve Buck, New Sculpture Observed, Angel Row Gallery, Nottingham (1990)
- Christo (20th Century Artists Series), Rizzoli International Pub. (1990). ISBN 9780847812394
- Jørgen Haugen Sørensen, Kunstbogklubben, Forlaget Søren Fogtdal, Copenhagen, 1994.
- À La Rencontre De 100 Peintures Célèbres (French), Chantecler (1997), ISBN 9782803427826
- Picasso’s Ladies, Jewelry by Wendy Ramshaw (co-authored with Paul Greenhaulgh and Eric Turner), Merrell Pub. Ltd (1998). ISBN 9781858940656
- Art: The Critics’ Choice, Watson and Guptill (1999). ISBN 9780823002603
- Sutton Taylor: A Lustrous Art, UK, Hart Gallery (1999). ISBN 9781902721026
- Great Women Collectors (co-authored with Charlotte Gere), UK: P. Wilson. USA: H. Abrams (1999). ISBN 9780810963931
- Max Couper: The Plot, Booth-Clibborn Editions (2002). ISBN 9781861541239
- Smile, British Museum Press (2002). ISBN 9780714127811
- Colin Rose: Edge to Edge, Black Dog Publishing Ltd (2003). ISBN 9781901033922
- Art - The Critics Choice: 150 Masterworks of Western Art Selected and Defined by the Experts, New Line Books (2005). ISBN 9781597640459
- Lucian Freud, Mapping the Human, CV Publications (2012). ISBN 9781908419538
- Figure to Ground: Five Painters, Cv Publications (2012). ISBN 9781908419477
- David Hockney and the Yorkshire Landscape (co-authored with James Cahill, Michael Lovell-Plank and edited by Nicholas James), CV Publications (2012). ISBN 9781908419262
- Photography and Art: Documents and Dreams (co-authored with Anne Blood), CV Publishing (2013). ISBN 9781908419408
