= Titan (prison) =

Proposed classification of prison in England and Wales

Titan Prison (proposed)
- Location: England and Wales (proposed sites: London, West Midlands, North West)
- Status: Cancelled
- Security class: Proposed high-capacity prison model
- Capacity: 2,500 per unit (planned)
- Population: N/A
- Opened: Not built (initial plan: 2012–2014)
- Closed: Cancelled in April 2009
- Managed by: Ministry of Justice (UK)
- Governor: N/A

Titan Prison or Titan gaol was a proposed new classification of prison in England and Wales, designed to increase the overall prison capacity and improve operational efficiency.

In plans announced in December 2007, the Titan concept included the proposed construction of three new prisons each housing 2,500 inmates, well above the 1,461 capacity of the largest prison at the time, HMP Wandsworth in London.

After much opposition and criticism, the plans were understood to have been dropped on 24 April 2009, with the postulated reason being difficulty in gaining planning permission for the new sites. It was expected that capacity would instead be increased through the creation of five new 1,500-capacity prisons, with two to be started immediately.

In a related change, in 2008, the operational management of three existing closely located prisons were merged to form the newly named Hewell (HM Prison), in an effort to improve efficiency, while retaining the existing buildings.

== Background ==
Labour Government Justice Minister Jack Straw initiated a review of over-crowding in the prison system, which resulted in the December 2007 report, Securing the Future - Proposals for the efficient and sustainable use of custody in England and Wales, produced by Lord Carter of Coles Review of Prisons .

The report amongst other issues proposed the building three new prisons larger than any before built. The existing largest prisons held on average 1,461 prisoners. The new Titan jails would hold 2,500 prisoners each.

There were three proposed Titan prisons, one initially due to be completed in 2012, with the other 2 in 2014. Likely locations were in London, the West Midlands and the North West of England.

The location for the proposed Titan Prison in the North West was the Omega business park in of Warrington.

The Titan Prison for the London area may have been located in the Thames corridor region.

== Design ==
The Titan prisons were to have comprised five units, each with about 500 offenders in different segments. The segments would have been served by central catering and healthcare facilities. The new prisons would have incorporated technology by design, including electronic locking and bio-metric identification.

== Advantages ==
The stated advantages were relieved overcrowding, with prison places rising to 96,000 from the current 81,000. The new prisons would also have allowed closure of existing old facilities, some dating from the Victorian era. The new facilities would also provide economies of scale in the construction and operation of the new prison places.

== Criticisms ==
The plans were criticised over the availability of possible sites, and the possibility of planning delays and disputes. The programme has been planned with no formal consultation of key experts such as the Chief Inspector of Prisons or the Prison Governors Association. Organisations such as the Howard League for Penal Reform have been leading the campaign against titan prisons.

The policy was also criticised for going against the established benefit of smaller prisons closer to prisoners' homes, allowing better interaction between prisoners and family/prison staff. Titan prisons could have been built on "brownfield sites" that supposedly would have "good transport links" so that families and friends will have "reasonably easy access to visit". However, what constituted "reasonably easy access" was open to debate and the needs of many prisoners' families, who may have been single parents on benefits - needed to be properly understood. Anne Owers, Chief Inspector of Prisons, said: “On the horizon loom the Titans – 2,500-strong prison complexes, flying in the face of our, and others’, evidence that smaller prisons work better than large ones. They may be more efficient, but at the cost of being less effective.” Paul Tidball, of the Prison Governors Association also criticised the plans: “We are under-whelmed by the case… Our instinct is that smaller is better.”

Security concerns were also raised, pointing out Lord Woolf's report following the 1990 riots at Manchester Prison (known as Strangeways at the time), recommending a maximum prison size of 400.

The staffing levels and regime within titan prisons was also called into question. The Ministry of Justice has stated that titans will "focus on the strong dynamic interaction between officers and prisoners" - vital in creating a regime that looks to cut reoffending. Dynamic security uses high staff to prisoner ratios and allows for relative freedom of movement. The opposite would be a prison that relies on barred gates and CCTV more than staff and where the emphasis is on control, monitoring and restriction of movement. Concerns have been raised over the government's plans for titans to include "new technology" such as "biometric scanning, bar coding, electronic door operation" which will "deliver significant staff savings". The prison design will also include "optimal sight lines" to "result in better staff utilisation".

Examples from abroad also showed failings in programmes similar to the proposed titans. Chief Inspector of Prisons, Anne Owers, gave evidence to the House of Commons Justice Select Committee in December 2007, and said: “We assess every prison we inspect against our 4 tests of a good prison - that prisoners are held safely, treated with respect, engage in purposeful activity and are prepared for resettlement - and it is very evident, when we look at those assessments, that small prisons do better... That is because they provide an environment in which people are known, in which relationships can develop, in which people are often closer to home… In France, in 1992 it was decided to build a very large prison just outside Paris, a place called Fleury-Mérogis. That was to hold 2,800 people. It currently holds 3,600 people and the one thing the French have decided is they will never do it again…because they found that it could not be managed well.”

The National Council of Independent Monitoring Boards also claimed that ministers have not explained why they would save money.

== HMP Hewell ==
In January 2008 it was announced that the prisons HMP Blakenhurst, Brockhill and Hewell Grange will be merged into one, as a newly named 1,428 capacity prison, HMP Hewell, due to be in place by April 2008. HM Prison Service, 07 Mar 2008. The three prisons are all sited on the estate of Hewell Grange a country house Worcestershire, England, and will not be demolished. Rather, several administrative and management functions will be merged for efficiency, along the Titan model.

== See also ==
- United Kingdom prison population
- His Majesty's Prison Service
- List of prisons in the United Kingdom
- Howard League for Penal Reform
