= John Vaizey, Baron Vaizey =

British author and economist

The Right Honorable The Lord Vaizey
- Born: John Ernest Vaizey; 1 October 1929
- Died: 19 July 1984 (aged 54)
- Spouse: Marina Stansky (m. 1961)
- Children: 3 (including Edward)

Academic background
- Education: Queens' College, Cambridge

Academic work
- Discipline: Economics
- Sub-discipline: Economy of the United Kingdom; education economics
- Institutions: United Nations Office at Geneva; St Catharine's College, Cambridge; University of Oxford; University of London; Worcester College, Oxford; Brunel University

Member of the House of Lords
- In office 23 June 1976 – 19 July 1984

Personal details
- Party: Labour (until 1978); Conservative (from 1978)

John Ernest Vaizey, Baron Vaizey (1 October 1929 – 19 July 1984) was a British author and economist, who specialised in education.

== Early life and education ==
Vaizey was born on 1 October 1929 in East Greenwich, London, England, younger child and only son of wharfinger Ernest Vernon Vaizey and Lucy Butler Hart. He was educated Colfe's Grammar School in Lewisham, London (since the abolition of grammar schools in 1976, it has been an independent school). However, in December 1943 he developed osteomyelitis, and was admitted to hospital here he spent the next two painful years lying on his stomach encased in plaster. He completed his education at the school of Queen Mary's Hospital, Carshalton.

Having won an open exhibition to the University of Cambridge, he chose his college by pricking a list with a pin; it landed on Queens' College, Cambridge. He matriculated into Queens' College in 1948 to study the economics Tripos. He achieved a second class (division I) in part one 1949 and a first class in part two in 1951. He thereby graduated with a Bachelor of Arts (BA) degree in 1951: as per tradition, his BA was later promoted to a Master of Arts (MA Cantab) degree.

== Career ==
=== Academic career ===
From 1952 to 1953, Vaisey was a research officer at the United Nations Economic Commission based at the United Nations Office at Geneva. In 1953, he was elected a fellow of St Catharine's College, Cambridge. Three years later, in 1956, Vaizey moved to the University of Oxford where he had been appointed a university lecturer in economics and economic history. The main theme of his research was the economics of education, which began with his book The Costs of Education published in 1958. In 1960, he moved to the Institute of Education, University of London, where he oversaw a research unit as its director for the next two years.

In 1962, Vaizey elected a fellow of Worcester College, Oxford. While at Worcester College, Vaizey set up a committee to aid people arrested in Oxford for importuning, having accused the police of using agents provocateurs in policing public spaces. From 1965 to 1966, he was a visiting professor to the University of California. In 1966, he gave the Eleanor Rathbone Lectures to the Universities of Liverpool and Durham. In 1966, he moved to Brunel University as Professor of Economics; a former College of advanced technology, it had only just been awarded University Status by royal charter that year. He became head of its school of social sciences in 1973. He served as an early Chief Examiner for the subject of economics for the International Baccalaureate. From 1974 to 1975, he was a Centenary Professor at the University of Adelaide.

In 1975, Vaizey was offered the post of the vice-chancellor of the Monash University, based in Melbourne, Australia. He accepted and then withdrew, after attacks by Australian artists against his close friend Bryan Robertson, who should have taken over the directorship of the National Gallery of Victoria.

Vaizey retired from Brunel in 1982. Then, in his last years, he served as principal of the St Catherine's Foundation at Cumberland Lodge: he had been a trustee from 1972 to 1982.

=== Politics and government ===
In addition to his academic career, Vaizey was active in politics and government. He was an executive of the Fabian Society, a socialist organisation with links to the Labour Party from 1959 to 1966. From 1962 to 1966, he was a member of the National Advisory Council on the Training and Supply of Teachers which reported to the Minister of Education. He sat on the Public Schools Commission from 1966 to 1968: its aim was to "advise on the best way of integrating the public schools with the state system of education" (broadly including all independent schools and later also direct grant grammar schools. From 1970 to 1972, he was a member of the Inner London Education Authority.

Internationally, he was a member of the UNESCO National Commission from 1965 to 1972 and from 1978 until his death. He was also a member of the Spanish Commission on Education from 1968 to 1972: in recognition of his work, he was awarded the Order of El Sabio by Spain in 1969.

In the 1976 Prime Minister's Resignation Honours (Labour's Harold Wilson), he was awarded a life peerage, and on 23 June, he was created Baron Vaizey, of Greenwich, in Greater London. He made his maiden speech on 20 July 1976 during the debate on the Race Relations Bill. He originally took the Labour whip, having been a socialist since his early youth. However, he became more and more disillusioned with the party under James Callaghan, and in 1978 he left the party and joined the Conservatives in advance of the general election the following year. On 20 June 1984, he made his final speech in the House of Lords, fittingly, during a debate on Adult and Further Education.

== Personal life ==
In 1961, he married the author Marina Stansky, daughter of Lyman Stansky, a lawyer from New York City. One of their children is the Conservative Party politician Edward Vaizey, who himself was made a life peer.

Vaizey was very religious, being a devout high Anglican although he also described himself as a Puritan.

Lord Vaizey died on 19 July 1984 in St Thomas' Hospital, London, following heart surgery. He was 54 years old.

== Works ==
- The Trade Unionist and Full Employment (1955)
- The Costs of Education (1958)
- Scenes from Institutional Life and Other Writings (1959)
- The Brewing Industry 1886–1951: An Economic Study (1960)
- Britain in the Sixties: Education for tomorrow (1962)
- The Economics of Education (1962)
- Education in a Class Society: The Queen and her Horses Reign ([1963])
- The Control of Education (1963)
- Barometer Man (1966)
- The Costing of Educational Plans (1967)
- Industry and the Intellectuals (1970)
- The Type to Succeed (1970)
- Capitalism (1971)
- Education (1971)
- Social Democracy (1971)
- The History of British Steel (1974)
- Education in the Modern World (1975)
- Political Economy and the Problems of Our Time (1975)
- Capitalism and Socialism: A History of Industrial Growth (1980)
- In Breach of Promise: Gaitskell, Macleod, Titmuss, Crosland, Boyle: Five Men who shaped a Generation (1983)
- National Health (1984)

== Arms ==
Coat of arms of John Vaizey, Baron Vaizey
Crest Between two martlets respectant Sable a cubit arm in armour the hand gauntleted and holding a sprig of oak leaves Proper. Escutcheon Azure on a cross engrailed between four cross crosslets erased Argent a Catherine wheel of the field. Supporters On either side a harlequin vested paly Argent and Azure cap and shoes Or supporting with the exterior hand a staff Proper. Motto Evasi
