= Ed Vaizey =

British Conservative politician

The Right Honourable The Lord Vaizey of Didcot PC
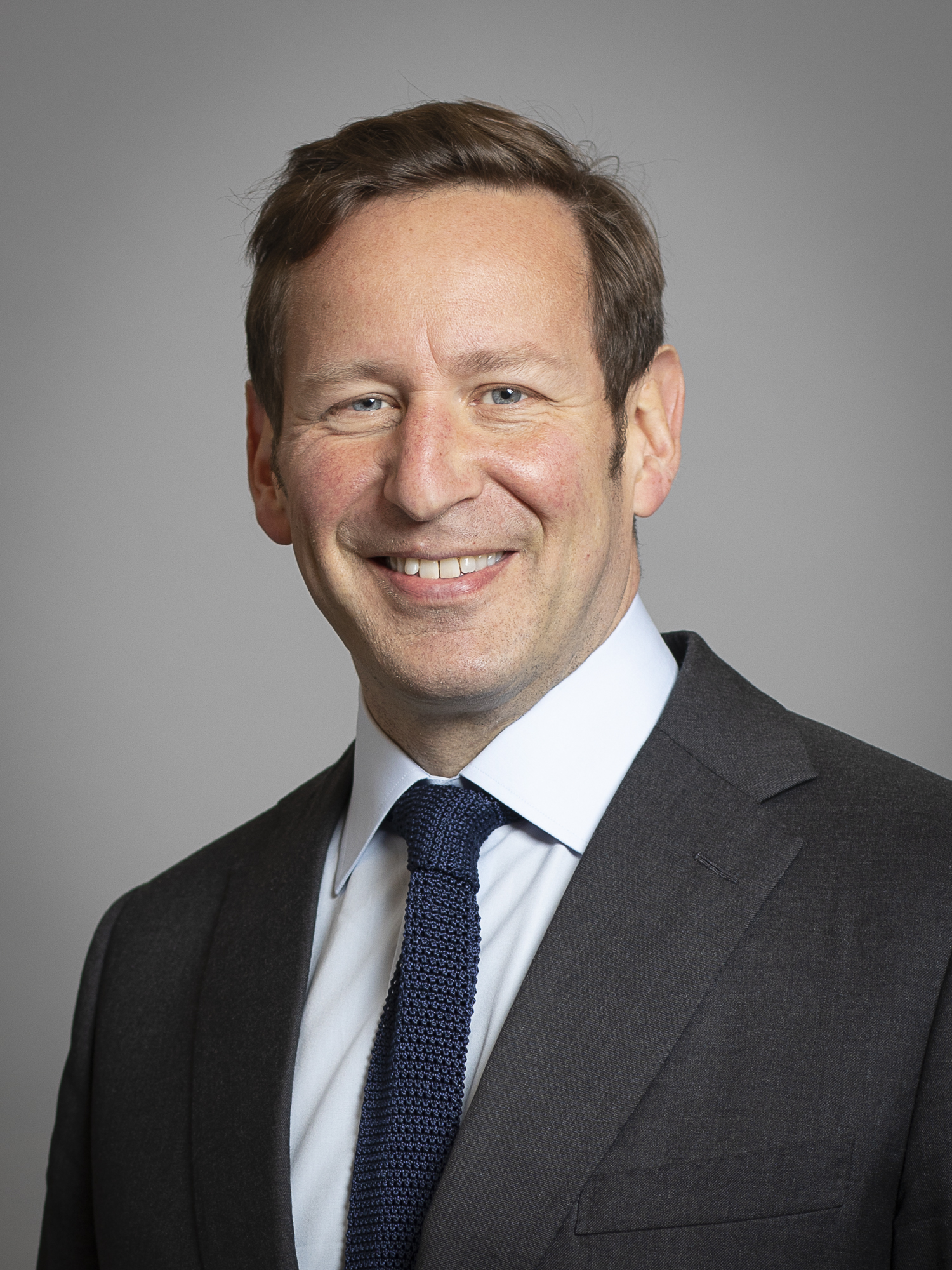
- Official portrait, 2020

Minister of State for Culture and the Digital Economy (Note: Culture, Communications and Creative Industries (2010–2014))
- In office 14 May 2010 – 15 July 2016
- Prime Minister: David Cameron
- Preceded by: Siôn Simon
- Succeeded by: Matt Hancock

Shadow Minister for Culture, Media and Sport
- In office 7 November 2006 – 6 May 2010
- Leader: David Cameron
- Preceded by: Malcolm Moss
- Succeeded by: Gloria De Piero

Member of the House of Lords
- Lord Temporal
- Life peerage 1 September 2020

Member of Parliament for Wantage
- In office 5 May 2005 – 6 November 2019
- Preceded by: Robert Jackson
- Succeeded by: David Johnston

Personal details
- Born: Edward Henry Butler Vaizey; 5 June 1968 (age 58) St Pancras, London, England
- Party: Conservative (Note: Whip suspended from 3 September to 29 October 2019.)
- Spouse: Alexandra Holland (m. 2005)
- Children: 2
- Parents: John Vaizey, Baron Vaizey (father); Marina Vaizey (mother)
- Education: Merton College, Oxford (BA)
- Website: vaizey.com

Edward Henry Butler Vaizey, Baron Vaizey of Didcot, PC (born 5 June 1968) is a British politician, media columnist and political commentator. A member of the Conservative Party, he was Minister for Culture, Communications and Creative Industries from 2010 to 2016 and Member of Parliament (MP) for Wantage from 2005 to 2019. He was made a life peer in 2020.

== Early life ==
Vaizey was born in June 1968 in St Pancras, London. He is the son of the late John Vaizey, a Labour (later Conservative) life peer, and the art historian Marina Vaizey (The Lady Vaizey CBE). His father's family is from South London. His mother's family, of Polish Jewish descent, is from New York City. He spent part of his childhood in Berkshire. He was educated at St Paul's School, London before reading history at Merton College, Oxford. Elected Librarian of the Oxford Union, he graduated with an upper second class degree. After leaving university, Vaizey worked for the Conservative MPs Kenneth Clarke and Michael Howard as an adviser on employment and education issues. He practised as a barrister for several years, in family law and child care.

== Political career ==
Vaizey first stood for Parliament at the 1997 general election, when he was the Conservative Party candidate for Bristol East. In the 2001 general election, he acted as an election aide to Iain Duncan Smith. He unsuccessfully stood at the 2002 local elections for the safe Labour ward of Harrow Road (based around the area of that name) in the City of Westminster.

Vaizey is regarded as a moderniser within the Conservative Party, contributing in both policy and image terms. He was a speechwriter for Michael Howard, the then Leader of the Conservative Party, until December 2004, and editor of the Blue Books series which looked into new approaches to Conservative policy in areas such as health and transport.

Vaizey was one of Michael Howard's inner circle of advisers and a member of a group of Young Conservatives somewhat disparagingly referred to as the "Notting Hill Set" along with David Cameron—elected party leader in December 2005—George Osborne, Michael Gove, Nicholas Boles and Rachel Whetstone. Like Gove and Boles, he is a fellow of the Henry Jackson Society, and also a vice-chairman of Conservative Friends of Poland.

=== Member of Parliament ===
In 2002, Vaizey was selected by Wantage Conservative Association to be its candidate for the 2005 general election to succeed the sitting MP, Robert Jackson, who subsequently crossed the floor to Labour. Vaizey won a two-thirds majority in the final ballot of members and was elected as MP in that election, receiving 22,394 votes. His majority was 8,017 over the Liberal Democrats; this represented 43% of the voters and a 1.9% swing from the Liberal Democrats to the Conservatives.

When first elected to the House of Commons, Vaizey became a member of the Standing Committee on the Consumer Credit Bill. Before being appointed to the Opposition frontbench he was a member of the Modernisation and Environmental Audit Select Committees and was Deputy Chairman of the Conservative's Globalisation and Global Poverty Policy Group.

In November 2006, Vaizey was appointed to the Conservative frontbench as a Shadow Minister for Culture, overseeing Arts and Broadcasting policy.

In 2009, Vaizey was reported to have claimed expenses for high-end furniture initially delivered to his London home, but intended for his constituency residence in Wantage. He later repaid the costs, acknowledging that some items were of higher quality than necessary, and stated he had not made similar claims before or since.

In the 2010 general election Vaizey received a vote of 29,284, which was 52% of the votes cast, winning an increased majority of 13,457. While the Conservative Party was in negotiations with the Lib Dems in the days after 6 May 2010, Vaizey was appearing regularly on television putting forward the Conservative viewpoint. In the 2015 general election Vaizey increased his majority to 21,749. In the 2017 general election Vaizey's majority was reduced but his share of the vote increased to 54.2%.

Vaizey was one of the group of 21 MPs who had the Conservative Whip removed in September 2019, sitting as an independent politician until having the whip restored on 29 October 2019. On 6 November 2019 Vaizey announced his decision not to stand for re-election in the 2019 general election.

=== Ministerial career ===
In 2010, Vaizey was appointed as Minister for Culture, Communications and Creative Industries with responsibilities in the Departments for Culture, Media and Sport and for Business, Innovation and Skills. Vaizey was the longest serving Minister of Culture since the post was created in 1964, serving a total of 2,255 days, exceeding the total set by the first incumbent, Jennie Lee, by 186 days. In 2013 the professional association for librarians, CILIP, passed a motion of no confidence in his tenure of the post at its AGM.

Upon leaving office, over 150 senior figures from the arts and creative industries wrote to the Daily Telegraph to express their thanks for his service as Minister for Culture and the Digital Economy. In 2011 he was mistakenly informed that he was to be Trade Minister, a post actually intended for Ed Davey.

Vaizey supported continued membership of the European Union in the 2016 referendum and is supportive of the European Atomic Energy Community (Euratom).

As a minister, Vaizey upheld the policy of free entry to the UK's national museums. Towards the end of his tenure, the Treasury introduced tax credits for theatre, orchestras and museums. Vaizey also secured £150 million in capital funding from the Treasury to help reform museum storage.

He oversaw the separation of English Heritage into two arms – a regulator, now known as Historic England, and a charity, English Heritage. Vaizey also held responsibility for the creative industries and ensured the continuance of the film tax credits, as well as the introduction of tax credits for video games, television and visual effects. As a result, the film industry became the second highest contributor to growth in the service sector in 2017, growing by 72.4% since 2014, compared to European growth of 8.5%. During his tenure, the creative industries grew at three times the rate of the UK economy as a whole. He was dismissed as a minister by Theresa May on 14 July 2016, and returned to the backbenches. He was appointed a member of the Privy Council in July 2016.

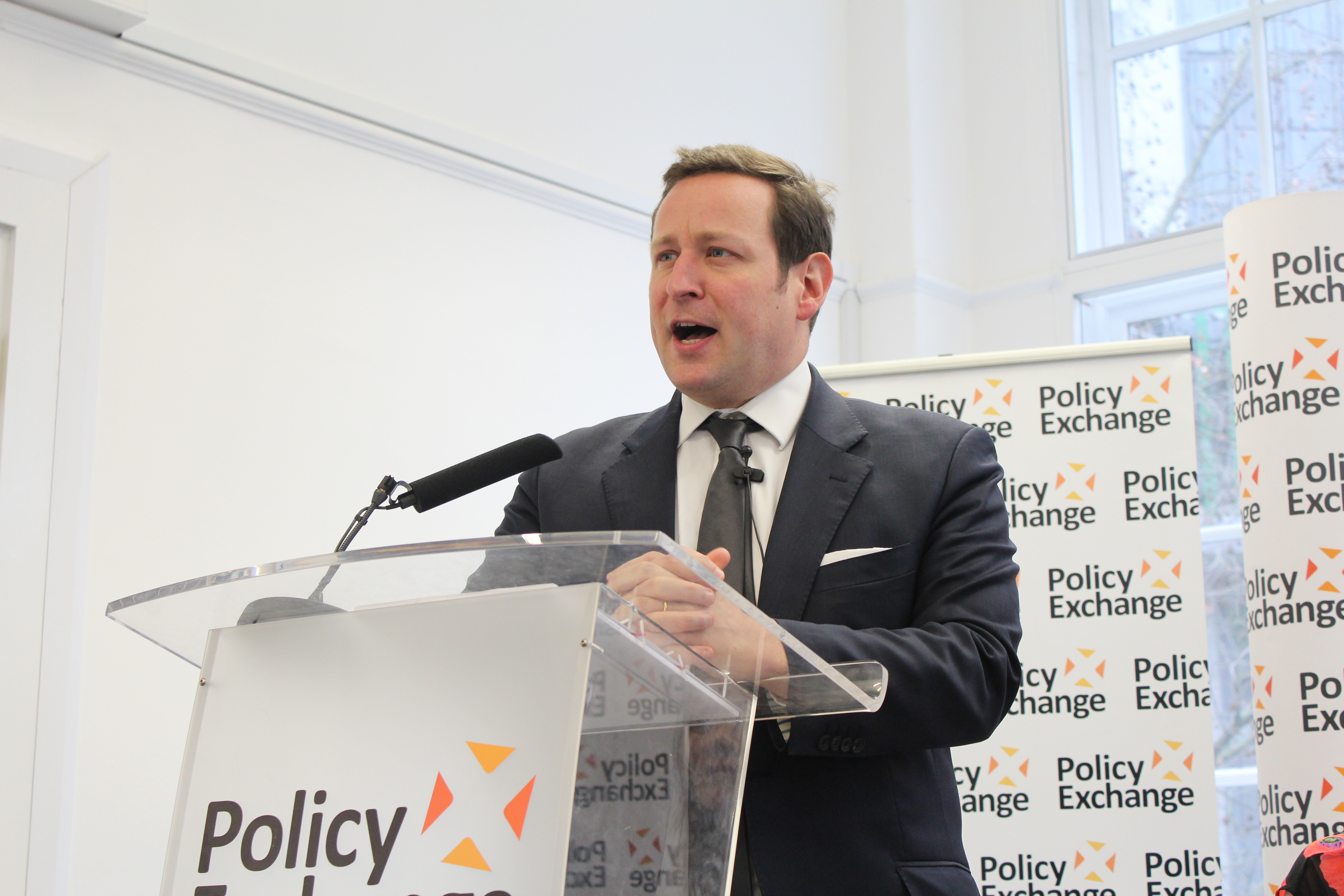
Vaizey in 2013

=== Peerage ===
It was announced on 31 July 2020 that Vaizey was to be raised to the peerage in the 2019 Dissolution Honours. He was created Baron Vaizey of Didcot, of Wantage in the County of Oxfordshire in the afternoon of 1 September.

As a peer, Vaizey proposed an amendment (and effective delay) to the 2024–25 Tobacco and Vapes Bill on 14 May 2025, following his visit to the Swiss research facility of leading heated tobacco company Philip Morris International, which paid for Vaizey's flight and accommodation. He suggested that more research was needed into comparing the harm to human health from heated tobacco relative to the harm of smoking cigarettes. Martin McKee, professor of European public health at the London School of Hygiene & Tropical Medicine, suggested that a better comparison would be to compare its harm relative to not smoking at all.

== Media career ==
Vaizey has been a regular commentator for the Conservative Party in the broadcast and news media. He wrote regular comment pieces for The Guardian between 1998 and 2005 and has contributed articles to The Sunday Times, The Times and The Daily Telegraph. He briefly wrote editorials for the Evening Standard. Vaizey is also a regular broadcaster, having appeared on Fi Glover's and Edwina Currie's shows on BBC Radio 5 Live, as a regular panelist on Channel 5's The Wright Stuff, BBC Radio 4's Despatch Box and Westminster Hour, and occasionally presented People and Politics on the BBC World Service. Vaizey is a regular contributor on ITV’s Good Morning Britain, and since December 2022, Vaizey has been a regular presenter on Times Radio.

On 24 September 2010, Vaizey was named tenth in the 2010 Guardian Film Power 100 list. He played a cameo role as an Oxfordshire MP in the 2012 film Tortoise in Love.

== Other work ==
Subsequent to leaving office as Minister for Culture, Communications and Creative Industries, Vaizey became a trustee of the National Youth Theatre and the international charity BritDoc, which supports long-form documentary making, both of which roles are unpaid. Vaizey is also a trustee of London Music Masters, a charity which provides children from disadvantaged backgrounds access to a high quality music education.

He was appointed the unpaid chairman of Creative Fuse NE, a programme overseen by five universities in North East England to look at the importance of fusing creativity and technology.

Vaizey took a role with LionTree Advisors who paid a salary of £50,000 for one day's work per week. The Advisory Committee on Business Appointments approved his application to work for the investment bank, which specialises in media and technology mergers and acquisitions, despite Vaizey's having met the firm on "official business" three times in his final months as minister.

He is a past president of the Old Pauline Club, the alumni association of St Paul's School which he attended as a pupil.

== Personal life ==
Vaizey married Alexandra Mary-Jane Holland on the 17 September 2005 in the chapel of the House of Commons. Michael Gove was his best man. The couple have two children.

== Bibliography ==
- A Blue Tomorrow – New Visions for Modern Conservatives (2001) (ed. with Michael Gove and Nicholas Boles). ISBN 1-84275-027-5
- Blue Book on Health: Conservative Visions for Health Policy (2002) ISBN 1-84275-043-7
- Blue Book on Transport: Conservative Visions for Transport Policy (ed with Michael McManus) (2002) ISBN 1-84275-044-5
- Blue Book on Education (ed with Michael McManus) (2003)

== Arms ==
Coat of arms of Ed Vaizey
Notes Arms of Edward's father, The Lord Vaizey Crest Between two martlets respectant Sable a cubit arm in armour the hand gauntleted and holding a sprig of oak leaves Proper. Escutcheon Azure on a cross engrailed between four cross crosslets erased Argent a Catherine wheel of the field. Supporters On either side a harlequin vested paly Argent and Azure cap and shoes Or supporting with the exterior hand a staff Proper. Motto Evasi

== Notes ==
Parliament of the United Kingdom
Preceded by Robert Jackson	Member of Parliament for Wantage; 2005–2019	Succeeded by David Johnston
Political offices
Preceded by Malcolm Moss	Shadow Minister for Culture, Media and Sport; 2006–2010	Succeeded by Gloria De Piero
Preceded by Siôn Simon	Parliamentary Under-Secretary of State for Culture, Communications and Creative Industries; 2010–2014	Succeeded by Himself as Minister of State for Culture and the Digital Economy
Preceded by Himself as Parliamentary Under-Secretary of State for Culture, Communications and Creative Industries	Minister of State for Culture and the Digital Economy; 2014–2016	Succeeded by Matt Hancock
Orders of precedence in the United Kingdom
Preceded by The Lord Herbert of South Downs	Gentlemen; Baron Vaizey of Didcot	Followed by The Lord Wharton of Yarm
