= Prisons and Probation Ombudsman =

British public oversight body

- Incumbent; Adrian Usher since April 2023; 3 years ago
- Appointer: Secretary of State for Justice
- Term length: 3 years
- Inaugural holder: Sir Peter Woodhead
- Formation: April 1994; 32 years ago
- Website: ppo.gov.uk

The Prisons and Probation Ombudsman (PPO) is a public body in the United Kingdom, appointed by the Secretary of State for Justice. The PPO carries out independent investigations into complaints and deaths in custody. The detailed roles and responsibilities of the PPO are set out in their terms of reference.

The PPO investigates:

- Complaints made by prisoners, young people in detention, offenders under probation supervision and individuals detained under immigration powers;
- Deaths of prisoners, young people in detention, approved premises’ residents and detained individuals due to any cause; and
- Deaths of recently released prisoners (except homicides) that occur within 14 days of release from prison.

The PPO’s remit covers prisons and probation areas in England and Wales. The PPO’s remit also includes the immigration detention estate throughout the UK and those under immigration escort anywhere in the UK and internationally.

== History ==
The report into the Strangeways Prison riot of 1990 led to the creation of an independent adjudicator for prisoner complaints. The report identified a lack of an independent point of appeal as one of the causes for the disturbances and recommended that an independent arbiter be appointed who would consider applications from complainants who had not achieved satisfaction through the internal complaints system. The office of the Prisons Ombudsman was officially created in 1994.

In 2001, the ombudsman’s remit was extended to include complaints from those under probation supervision. The office was re-named the Prisons and Probation Ombudsman to reflect this change. A further extension in 2006 incorporated complaints from those in immigration detention.

The fatal incidents function was introduced in 2004, adding to the ombudsman’s remit the requirement to investigate all deaths in prisons, probation approved premises and immigration detention facilities. The Ombudsman also has the ability to conduct ad-hoc investigations on request.

== Prisons and Probation Ombudsman ==
As of April 2023, the Prisons and Probation Ombudsman is Adrian Usher, who replaced acting ombudsman, Kimberley Bingham. Bingham replaced Sue McAllister who was originally appointed in October 2018.

Usher was previously a senior police officer at the Metropolitan Police Service, having served on Counter Terrorism and Anti-Corruption Commands, and was most recently a commander for learning and development where he led training across policing operations.

	From	Until	Remarks
Sir Peter Woodhead	May 1994	October 1999	Prisons Ombudsman
Stephen Shaw	November 1999	May 2010	Appointed as Prisons Ombudsman, became Prisons and Probation Ombudsman in 2001
Jane Webb	April 2010	June 2011	Acting Prisons and Probation Ombudsman
Nigel Newcomen	June 2011	July 2017	Prisons and Probation Ombudsman
Elizabeth Moody	1 August 2017	October 2018	Acting Prisons and Probation Ombudsman
Sue McAllister	October 2018	June 2022	Prisons and Probation Ombudsman
Kimberley Bingham	July 2022	April 2023	Acting Prisons and Probation Ombudsman
Adrian Usher	April 2023	Present	Prisons and Probation Ombudsman
