= Parole Board (England and Wales) =

Independent executive non-departmental public body in the United Kingdom

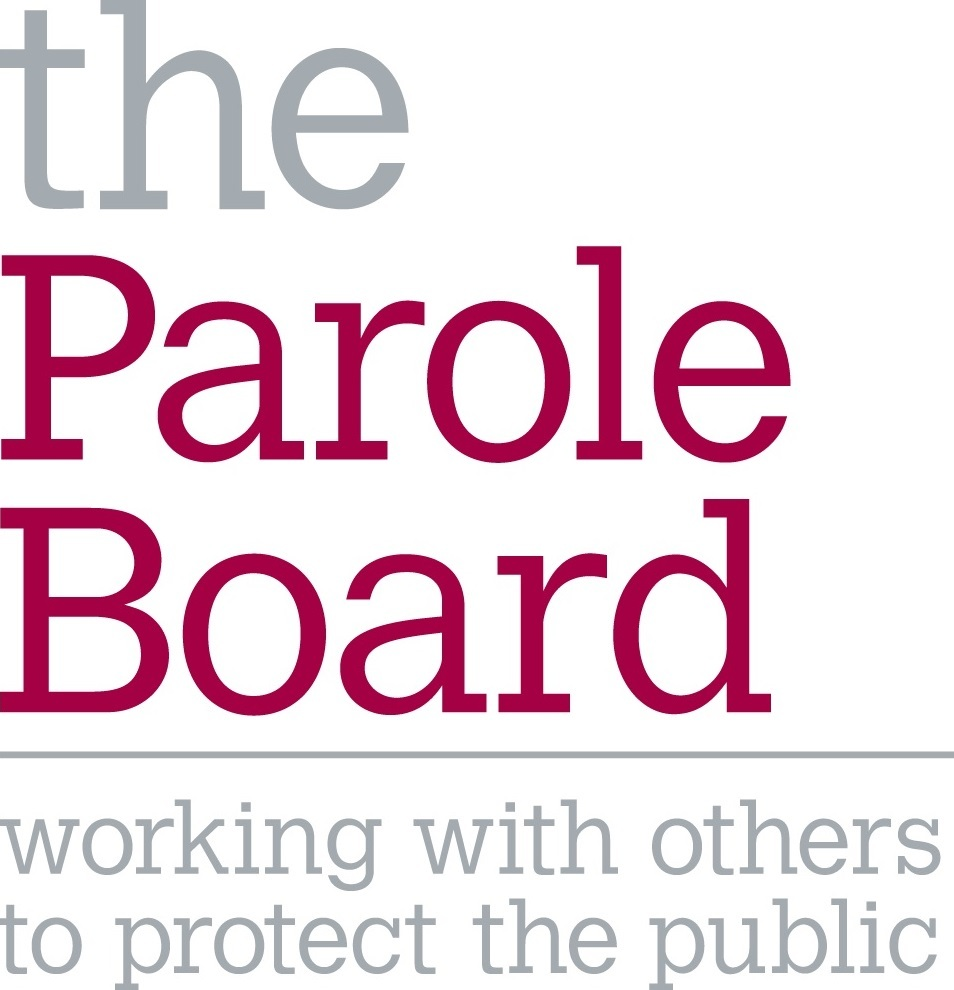
- Formation: 1968
- Legal status: Non-departmental public body
- Headquarters: 10 South Colonnade, London
- Region served: England and Wales
- Chief Executive Officer: Cecilia French
- Employees: 234 (2024/25)
- Website: www.gov.uk/government/organisations/parole-board

The Parole Board (Welsh: Y Bwrdd Parôl ar gyfer Cymru a Lloegr) was established in 1968 under the Criminal Justice Act 1967. It became an independent executive non-departmental public body (NDPB) on 1 July 1996 under the Criminal Justice and Public Order Act 1994. The Parole Board is governed by the Parole Board Rules 2016 made by Parliament under the Criminal Justice Act 2003. Parole Board members are appointed by the Secretary of State for Justice, but are required to take judicial decisions independent of Government.

The Parole Board's role is to make risk assessments about prisoners and to make a binding direction to Government about whether prisoners are released into the community on parole. The Parole Board must also give advice to Government when asked, most often about whether offenders are ready to be moved to open prisons from the closed prison estate.

== Responsibilities ==
The Parole Board must act in accordance with the type of sentence levied.

=== Indeterminate sentences ===
These include life sentence prisoners (mandatory life, discretionary life and automatic life sentence prisoners), His Majesty's Pleasure detainees, and prisoners given indeterminate sentences for public protection (IPP). The Parole Board also considers whether prisoners are safe to release into the community once they have completed their tariff (the minimum time they must spend in prison) and also whether the Secretary of State is justified in recalling them to prison for a breach of their life licence conditions (the rules which they must observe upon release).

=== Determinate sentences ===
These include discretionary conditional release (DCR) prisoners serving more than 4 years whose offence was committed before 4 April 2005, prisoners given extended sentences for public protection (EPP) for offences committed on or after 4 April 2005, and prisoners serving standard determinate sentences who have been recalled to prison after being released on licence. The Parole Board considers whether these prisoners are safe to release into the community once they have completed the minimum time they must spend in prison and also whether the Secretary of State is justified in recalling them to prison for a breach of their parole licence conditions (the rules which they must observe upon release).

== Hearings ==
The Parole Board holds two types of hearings.

=== Oral hearings ===
These normally take place in prison. The panel is chaired by a suitably accredited, trained and experienced Parole Board member. In most cases, there will be three Parole Board members on an oral panel, although the composition of the panel may be fewer when decided by the Parole Board. Where the circumstances of the case warrant it the panel will include a psychologist or psychiatrist.

In addition to the prisoner and the panel, others who may be present include the legal representative of the prisoner, together with a public protection advocate representing the Secretary of State and the victim(s), and witnesses such as probation officers, prison officers, psychologists and psychiatrists. The victim might also be in attendance at the beginning of a hearing in order to present their victim personal statement.

Oral hearings are used to consider the majority of cases where an indeterminate sentence prisoner is applying for release and also for some cases involving both determinate and indeterminate sentences where a prisoner is making representations against a decision to recall them to prison.

=== Paper hearings ===
Parole Board members sit in panels of one, two or three to consider cases on the papers and each member contributes to them on an equal footing. Any type of member can sit on these panels.

The panel takes a considered decision on the basis of a dossier that contains reports from prison staff and the probation service as well as details of the prisoners' offending history. The dossier also contains a variety of formal risk assessments based on offending history, behaviour in prison, courses completed and psychological assessments. The dossier may also contain a victim impact statement or a victim personal statement.

Paper panels are used to consider the majority of cases where a determinate sentence prisoner is applying for parole and also for the initial hearing for all cases where a prisoner has been recalled to prison.

== See also ==
- Electronic tagging
- Temporary licence
- Parole Board for Scotland
