= HM Chief Inspector of Prisons =

Prison inspector in England and Wales

His Majesty's Chief Inspector of Prisons of HM Inspectorate of Prisons
- Emblem of HM Inspectorate of Prisons
- Incumbent; Charlie Taylor since 2020
- Type: Senior inspector of prisons in England and Wales
- Nominator: Secretary of State for Justice
- Appointer: Secretary of State for Justice
- Formation: 1 January 1981
- First holder: Philip Barry
- Website: hmiprisons.justiceinspectorates.gov.uk

- Applies to: England and Wales
- Relates to: Head of HM Inspectorate of Prisons (England and Wales)

Other UK counterparts
- Northern Ireland: Chief Inspector of Criminal Justice in Northern Ireland
- Scotland: HM Chief Inspector of Prisons for Scotland

His Majesty's Chief Inspector of Prisons (commonly HM Chief Inspector of Prisons) is the head of HM Inspectorate of Prisons and the senior inspector of prisons, young offender institutions and immigration service detention and removal centres in England and Wales. The current chief inspector is Charlie Taylor.

HM Chief Inspector of Prisons is appointed by the Justice Secretary from outside the prison service for a period of five years. The post was created by royal sign-manual on 1 January 1981 and established by the Criminal Justice Act 1982 on the recommendation of a committee of inquiry into the UK prison service under Justice May.

The chief inspector provides independent scrutiny of detention in England and Wales through carrying out announced and unannounced inspections of detention facilities. Their remit includes prisons, young offenders institutions, police cells and immigration service detention centres. They are also called upon to inspect prison facilities in Commonwealth dependencies and to assist with the monitoring of Northern Ireland prison facilities.

The chief inspector is not operationally part of His Majesty's Prison Service or the Ministry of Justice (United Kingdom), and both have been criticised at times in the reports issued by the chief inspector after prison visits, or in their annual report, delivered to the Justice Secretary and presented to Parliament. The inspectorate's independence has been interpreted differently by the different holders of the post. From the inspectorate of Stephen Tumim onwards, HM Chief Inspector of Prisons has been more willing to speak critically in public of government penal policy.

There is also a separate post of His Majesty's Inspectorate of Prisons for Scotland, and a HM Inspectorate of Probation.

== Prisons Act 1835 ==
Prisons Act 1835 (Note: The citation of this act by this short title was authorised by section 1 of, and the first schedule to, the Short Titles Act 1896. Due to the repeal of those provisions it is now authorised by section 19(2) of the Interpretation Act 1978.)
- Act of Parliament
- Parliament of the United Kingdom
- Long title: An Act for effecting greater Uniformity of Practice in the Government of the several Prisons in England and Wales; and for appointing Inspectors of Prisons in Great Britain.
- Citation: 5 & 6 Will. 4. c. 38
- Territorial extent: England and Wales (Note: Section 1.)

Dates
- Royal assent: 25 August 1835
- Commencement: 25 August 1835 (Note: The Acts of Parliament (Commencement) Act 1793.)
- Repealed: 18 December 1953
Other legislation
Amended by	Millbank Prison Act 1843
Repealed by	Prison Act 1865; Statute Law Revision Act 1874; Prison Act 1877; Statute Law Revision (No. 2) Act 1888; Statute Law Revision Act 1953

Status: Repealed

Text of statute as originally enacted

The Prisons Act 1835 (5 & 6 Will. 4. c. 38) was an act of the Parliament of the United Kingdom of Great Britain and Ireland that introduced five paid prison inspectors.

Sections 2, 5, 6, 11, and 12 of the act were repealed by section 73 of, and the third schedule to, the Prison Act 1865 (28 & 29 Vict. c. 126), which came into force on 1 February 1866.

The whole act, so far as unrepealed, was repealed by section 1 of, and the first schedule to, the Statute Law Revision Act 1953 (2 & 3 Eliz. 2. c. 5), which came into force on 18 December 1953.

== HM Chief Inspectors of Prisons ==
- 1981–1982: Philip Barry
- 1982–1987: Sir James Hennessy
- 1987–1995: Judge Stephen Tumim
- 1995–2001: General Sir David Ramsbotham
- 2001–2010: Dame Anne Owers
- 2010–2016: Nick Hardwick
- 2016–2020: Peter Clarke
- 2020–present: Charlie Taylor

== See also ==
- Prison Act 1877
- His Majesty's Inspectorate of Prisons for Scotland
- Criminal Justice Inspection Northern Ireland
