= Prison: First & Last 24 Hours =

- Genre: Reality television, Documentary
- Narrated by: Siobhan Redmond (2015); Gavin Mitchell (2016)
- Country of origin: United Kingdom
- Original language: English
- No. of series: 2
- No. of episodes: 16

Production
- Production location: Scotland
- Running time: 60 minutes
- Production companies: STV Productions and Motion Content Group

Original release
- Network: Sky 1
- Release: 28 October 2015 – 5 December 2016

Prison: First & Last 24 Hours is a British documentary series that was broadcast between 28 October 2015 and 5 December 2016 on Sky 1. It followed prisoners in four Scottish Prison Service-run prisons in Scotland who are either in their first 24 hours of their sentences or are about to be released (liberated in Scotland) from jail.

The first series aired on Wednesdays from 28 October 2015 for 8 weeks until 16 December 2015 and featured inmates and staff from HM Prison Barlinnie, HM Prison Cornton Vale, HM Prison Greenock and HM Prison Low Moss. This was the only series HMP Cornton Vale was featured in the programme.

On 26 April 2016, STV productions and Sky 1 recommissioned Prison: First & Last 24 Hours for the second and final series which aired on Mondays from 17 October 2016 for 8 weeks until 5 December 2016. it once again featured inmates and staff from series one prisons HMP Barlinnie, HMP Greenock and HMP Low Moss with HM Prison Edinburgh added as a new prison.

== Locations ==
Prison	Location	Duration
HM Prison Barlinnie	Riddrie, Glasgow	Series 1–2
HM Prison Greenock	Greenock	Series 1–2
HM Prison Low Moss	Bishopbriggs	Series 1–2
HM Prison Edinburgh	Stenhouse, Edinburgh	Series 2
HM Prison Cornton Vale	Stirling	Series 1

== International versions ==
In October 2015, STV Productions and GroupM Entertainment announced a format deal for the series with Australian broadcaster Nine Network, who will produce an 8-part series for viewers in Australia.
