= HM Prison Cornton Vale =

Women's prison in Stirling, Scotland

HMP YOI Cornton Vale
- Interactive map of HMP YOI Cornton Vale
- Location: Stirling; 56.14099°N 3.9482°W
- Status: Due to close in July 2023
- Capacity: 119
- Opened: 1975
- Closed: 2023
- Managed by: Scottish Prison Service
- Governor: Paula Arnold

HMP & YOI Cornton Vale was a women's prison and young offenders institution in Stirling, Scotland operated by the Scottish Prison Service. The facility comprised a total of 217 cells in its 5 houses. It accepted solely convicted women and girls from 1975 until 1978. In 1978 Parliament passed the necessary legislation to allow females to be held there on remand. Cornton Vale housed female adults and young offenders in Scotland, alongside HMP Grampian, HMP Edinburgh, HMP Greenock and HMP Polmont. In April 1999, the separation of adults and young offenders was attained. Lady Martha Bruce was the first Governor. The last Governor at Cornton Vale was Paula Arnold.

Cornton Vale was replaced by HMP & YOI Stirling, which has been constructed on an adjacent site. The new facilities opened in July 2023. Cornton Vale closed in April 2023 with inmates being accommodated in other establishments across the female estate prior to moving into the new HMP & YOI Stirling.

== Description ==
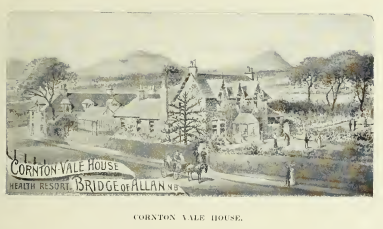
Cornton Vale Farm c.1880

The lands of Cornton Vale were sold by John Christie in 1871 to John Thomson, a farmer from Drumtogle in Perthshire. He built a new house and steading on the site, thereafter known as Cornton Vale and advertised it as a "Health Resort" with an address as Bridge of Allan. When he died in 1877 the property passed to his daughter Catherine. She married John Alexander, a Glasgow cement merchant and they lived in the house until his death in 1897. From then until 1901 it was occupied by Dr David McCosh, son of John McCosh.

Before 1939, the site belonged to a Church of Scotland labour colony (common until the Second World War). Opened in 1907, the colony provided a home and training in market gardening for habitual inebriates and others – all male – sent by the Church or by their families. After the First World War, it took in unemployed men, mainly veterans at first. From 1926 to 1931, it received public funds under the Empire Settlement Act 1922, and most of the trainees were helped to emigrate to the Dominions. It continued to train unemployed young men until the Second World War, but was sold off subsequently and re-opened as a male Borstal in 1946.

In 1975 the site was redeveloped as a purpose-built female prison. The layout was unconventional with a series of bungalows forming the basic concept, each with one warden and seven prisoners in individual rooms.

It is now Scotland's only all-female establishment and so nearly all female prisoners and young offenders in Scotland are housed here. The complex provides 230 places for women prisoners in five blocks. Four of these blocks (or houses) have 178 places and are sub-divided into six or seven-room units each with its own dining/sitting room, and almost all have a common kitchen or servery. One of these blocks containing 27 places is currently being renovated to provide a dedicated Young Offender facility.

In 2004 there was a trial period, allowing children up to the age of 5 years to stay with their mothers.

== Criticism ==
It has been criticised for overcrowding, with 340 inmates being held there in August 2004. A high number of suicides have taken place there. Eleven women killed themselves while serving sentences at Cornton Vale between 1995 and 2002. In 2010, Brigadier Hugh Munro (the Chief Inspector of Prisons for Scotland) declared the prison in a "state of crisis", citing overcrowding, two-hour waits for the toilet, cold meals, lack of activities and a deep problem of prisoner boredom which was impeding rehabilitation.

In 2006, 98% of the inmates had addiction issues; 80% had problems with mental health and 75% were survivors of abuse. It also holds children, in particular the babies of inmates who are imprisoned alongside their mothers and teenagers where there is no suitable accommodation available in young offenders institutions.

In 2006 it was announced that the practice of "double cuffing" all inmates who are in labour to a custody officer until second stage labour and immediately re-handcuffed after giving birth, had ended.

A 2012 review into women's prisons in Scotland, conducted by former Lord Advocate Elish Angiolini described Cornton Vale as "a miserable place" and that conditions for prisoners were "antediluvian and appalling".

In 2019 women were found “who clearly were in need of urgent care and treatment in a psychiatric facility, and [who] should not have been in a prison environment”. Among them was one woman who bit through the skin and muscle of her arm down to the bone and another who set her hair on fire.

== Replacement ==
Responding to the Angiolini report, the Scottish Government initially planned to construct HMP Inverclyde, a large women's prison near the existing HM Prison Greenock. The new prison, built on the former site of St Columba's High School on Inverkip Road, would have 300 places and would cost £75 million to construct.

In 2014 Justice Secretary Michael Matheson announced revised plans. The new Inverclyde unit will only accommodate 80 high-security women prisoners, with the remaining population housed at smaller units at HMP Grampian and HMP Edinburgh and regional custody units each accommodating up to 20 women. The Government also plans to increase use of non-custodial alternatives such as electronic tagging. The new plan called for the Inverclyde unit to open by 2017 and for Cornton Vale to close entirely by 2018. Responding to a 2016 inspector's report, which found unsanitary conditions at Cornton Vale, the Scottish Prison Service said pressures on Corton Vale would ease with the beginning of its rundown in the summer of 2016 (when some prisoners would move to HMP Polmont) but that full closure would not happen until 2020.

== Notable inmates ==
- Isla Bryson was briefly held at Cornton Vale.
- Avril Jones – woman who was convicted after the 2016 discovery of the disappearance of Margaret Fleming, a 19-year-old in her care. It was discovered that Fleming had been killed by her and her accomplice in late 1999 or early 2000 in order to secretly claim financial benefits for years. The case featured in the 2020 BBC documentary Murder Trial: The Disappearance of Margaret Fleming.
- Edith McAlinden (as of 2014) – responsible for a triple murder at a flat in Glasgow in 2004.
- Natalie McGarry – former SNP MP, jailed for embezzlement in 2022
