= Tiffany Scott (prisoner) =

Scottish criminal

Tiffany Louise Scott (born Andrew Burns, 1991/92 – 29 February 2024), was a Scottish sex offender who was subject to an Order for Lifelong Restriction after admitting to stalking a 13-year-old girl by sending her letters while serving time in prison. While in prison, Scott came out as a trans woman and applied successfully to be transferred from a men's to a women's prison.

== Biography ==
Originally from Kinglassie, Fife, media have described Scott as one of Scotland's most dangerous prisoners. Scott was first convicted of attacking a nurse in Cheshire, England, in 2010, while trying to escape from a hospital. In 2013, Scott admitted to stalking a 13-year-old girl while serving time in prison in 2011, and was sentenced to fourteen months in prison, but handed an Order for Lifelong Restriction, meaning release from prison would not be considered until there was no longer an "unmanageable risk to public safety". Scott had begun her social transition by 2016, but according to a 2023 article in The Telegraph, had not begun to medically transition.

Following a series of violent incidents at Glenochil Prison in Clackmannanshire during 2015, which included throwing a chair at a nurse and attacking prison officers, Scott appeared at Falkirk Sheriff Court in 2017 and was sentenced to a further year in prison. Originally scheduled for Alloa Sheriff Court, the Crown Office had recommended dropping the case because Scott was believed to pose too much of a danger to the public to appear in court, and the Victorian building at Alloa was deemed to be insufficiently secure. However, the trial was instead moved to Falkirk. Scott did not attend the trial in person, but was required under Scottish law to appear in court for sentencing. Members of the public were cleared from the court when Scott was present. In October 2023, Scott was convicted of assaults against four prison officers that had occurred during incidents at Glasgow Royal Infirmary and HMP Low Moss during 2021, and sentenced to two years in prison. The trial had to be moved partway through proceedings to accommodate an increase in security personnel.

In January 2023, the Daily Record reported that Scott had successfully applied for a transfer from a men's to a women's prison. The Telegraph reported that a previous application to be transferred had been rejected, and that Scott had successfully reapplied to be moved to a women's prison. Following the report, and the case of Isla Bryson, who was sent to a women's prison after a rape conviction, the Scottish Prison Service announced on 29 January 2023 that it would pause the movement of all transgender prisoners while it carried out an "urgent review" into all of the transgender cases within its prisons. New guidelines were subsequently introduced requiring transgender offenders convicted of violent offences against women to be housed in men's prisons. These became effective from 26 February 2024.

== Death ==
On the evening of 28 February 2024, Scott, who was being held at HMP Grampian, was taken to hospital after becoming unwell and died at Aberdeen Royal Infirmary the following day. The Scottish Prison Service confirmed that a report had been submitted to the Procurator Fiscal and that a Fatal Accident Inquiry would be held in due course.

== Subsequent events ==
On 20 November 2024, the author J. K. Rowling criticised Edinburgh City Council, and accused it of honouring Scott's death, after it flew the transgender flag above the City Chambers to mark Transgender Day of Remembrance, and included Scott's name as the only Scottish entry on a list of deceased transgender people. A spokesman responded that the flag had been flown annually since 2019 but made no comment about the inclusion of Scott's name.

== See also ==
- Isla Bryson
- Karen White
