= Ian McAteer =

Scottish gangster

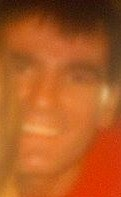
- Born: Ian Douglas McAteer; November 1961 (age 64); Dalmuir, Clydebank, Scotland
- Other names: Mad Jock; Little Hands
- Occupations: Drug dealer, used car salesman
- Years active: 1979–2001
- Children: 2
- Status: Incarcerated
- Convictions: Robbery (1985); Illegal drug trade (1993); Murder, illegal drug trade, perverting the course of justice (2001)
- Penalty: Five years' imprisonment plus four months (1985 offences); Five years' imprisonment (1993 offences); Life imprisonment with a minimum term of 22½ years (2001 offences)

Ian Douglas McAteer (born November 1961) is a Scottish former gangster who was a prominent figure in the Glasgow and Liverpool criminal underworlds during the later 20th century. McAteer accumulated various convictions, and in 2001 was sentenced to life for the 1999 murder of a gangland associate; he had been acquitted of a previous murder charge in 1998. McAteer was a suspect in other crimes, including the 1999 murder of television presenter Jill Dando.

== Background ==
McAteer was born in Dalmuir, Clydebank, growing up between his birthplace and Easterhouse, Glasgow. By age 11, an impoverished McAteer was robbing purses and handbags to feed himself and his four siblings, all of whom had fractured childhoods and spent time in foster care.

Investigative journalist Graham Johnson records McAteer's career as beginning in 1979, when he started to forge links with Glasgow's main drug barons. He attained preferred status as a distributor in Scotland, and developed an even more profitable relationship with the Liverpool Mafia. Aside from drug dealing, McAteer reportedly became involved in arms trafficking, debt collection and protection, and laundered money through his successful used car business. According to Johnson and Liverpool Echo crime reporter Tom Duffy, McAteer also worked as a hitman.

McAteer was described in the Liverpool Echo as "one of Scotland's most feared gangsters", while a senior Liverpool detective labelled him "extremely dangerous". He was known within Merseyside as "Mad Jock"; "Little Hands" has been reported as an alternate nickname.

McAteer had a nomadic lifestyle, with home bases including Maryhill, Drumchapel and Leicester. He has two children.

== Criminal history ==
=== Robbery conviction ===
In 1985, McAteer was sentenced to four years' imprisonment for his role in a robbery at the Golden Garter Disco in Drumchapel. He was also given an additional three-month sentence for a bail offence.

=== Drug conviction and Bennett trial ===
In 1993, McAteer was arrested while in possession of an abundance of recreational drugs. He represented himself at Glasgow's High Court later that year, but was nevertheless sentenced to five years in prison. While incarcerated at HMP Glenochil in Tullibody, he had conflict with Glaswegian criminal John "Jack" Bennett, a former associate. According to the family of Bennett, he rejected McAteer's sexual advances, which led to a rift between the two.

On 28 February 1998, following both McAteer and Bennett's release from prison, the latter was killed in a daylight attack on Glasgow's Royston Road, incurring 57 stab wounds. McAteer and two other men (Robert Burke and Donald McPhail) stood trial for the murder; the prosecution posited that McAteer had put out a contract while in jail, offering "2 oz of tobacco and 50 temazepam tablets" to any inmate who killed Bennett. On 10 August a jury at Glasgow's High Court returned a not proven verdict.

=== Shooting arrest and further scrutiny ===
Later in 1998, McAteer was arrested in Merseyside on suspicion of shooting a man at a set of traffic lights in Glasgow: the incident had occurred mere yards from the site of the Bennett murder. He avoided charges when the victim refused to make a formal complaint. McAteer also became a suspect in the 1999 murder of English television presenter Jill Dando.

=== Selkirk murder and additional convictions ===
While in prison, McAteer met Liverpudlian Warren Selkirk, and later enlisted him as a drug courier. By 1999, McAteer reportedly feared that his colleague was becoming a liability, and had particular concerns over his mounting gambling debts. On 30 October, Selkirk was shot five times at Crosby Marina in North Merseyside, while his children waited for him in a nearby car; a plastic bag filled with dog excrement – a sign of "contempt" – was found in his right hand. Police traced McAteer travelling from Glasgow to Liverpool by tracking his mobile phone activity, which led to his arrest. McAteer maintained his innocence, and later blamed Liverpool associate Paul Bennett for setting him up. An Irish terrorist group appeared to take responsibility for Selkirk's murder, but police determined that this was a red herring devised by McAteer.

According to Observer crime correspondent Tony Thompson, McAteer threatened to shoot multiple police officers as well as anyone who testified against him: at least two criminals were given new identities under the witness protection program in return for their testimony. On 5 April 2001 at Liverpool Crown Court, McAteer was found guilty of murder and sentenced to life. He was given a concurrent five-year term for attempting to pervert the course of justice, with sentencing delayed on a further conviction of plotting to supply ecstasy and heroin. Liverpool criminal David Baker received a four-year sentence for conspiracy to pervert the course of justice, for asking an associate to provide McAteer with a false alibi. Glaswegian James O'Neill, who had also been charged with the murder, was exonerated due to a lack of evidence.

Six months later, the drug offences – for which McAteer and seven others were originally remanded in custody by Liverpool magistrates in February 2000 – met with a 16-year sentence.

As of September 2002, McAteer was incarcerated at HMP Long Lartin in Worcestershire. In December 2003, he was refused permission to appeal his murder conviction. Following a 2006 review of the case at London's Royal Courts of Justice, Mr Justice Grigson ruled that McAteer must serve a minimum of 22-and-a-half years before being considered for parole.

==== Paul Ferris ====
Former Glasgow gangster Paul Ferris has known McAteer since childhood. In his 2005 book, Vendetta, Ferris protested McAteer's innocence in relation to the murder of Selkirk, suggesting that police pinned the murder to McAteer in order to assuage grief among the city of Liverpool. He argued that McAteer's "jealous" henchman, George Bell Smith – whose ex-girlfriend was now in a relationship with McAteer – provided false testimony of his boss indicating guilt (including the brandishing of a gun) in return for having a child sexual abuse charge dropped. McAteer's appeal would have indeed asserted that a key witness had charges against them dismissed after agreeing to give evidence.

Ferris found it implausible that McAteer, whom he described as being "so cautious as to be almost paranoid", would implicate himself in such a way, and concluded that Selkirk was killed by Irish criminals due to unpaid debts. In a 2005 interview he said: "It is common knowledge that [McAteer] did not do it. Even the dogs in the street know it... he is being kept inside because of politics and nothing else."

== Later life ==
In 2011, McAteer, alongside another former Glasgow gangster, Jamie Stevenson, raised £3,776 for Glasgow's Royal Hospital for Sick Children by running a marathon on a treadmill at HMP Shotts in North Lanarkshire. The effort was branded a "con" by the sister of Jack Bennett: she maintained McAteer's culpability for the murder of her brother.
