= Dominic Devine =

Scottish serial rapist (died 2023)

- Born: Dominic Devine c.1957
- Died: 6 August 2023 (aged 66); HM Prison Barlinnie, Glasgow, Scotland
- Other names: Dom; The Beast of Ibrox
- Status: Deceased
- Penalty: Life imprisonment (14-year minimum term)

Details
- Victims: 5–8
- Span of crimes: 1979–1987
- Country: Scotland
- Date apprehended: 1987

Dominic Devine (c.1957 – 6 August 2023) was a British convicted sex offender and serial rapist. Devine, known as the Beast of Ibrox, was sentenced to life imprisonment in 1987 for attacks against five women in the Ibrox area of Glasgow, including four rapes. He was the third person in Scottish history to be sentenced to life imprisonment for rape.

== Crimes ==
Devine was linked to the rapes of eight women in Ibrox between 1979 and 1987, although police suspected that he may have had other victims who were too afraid to come forward. He often ensured that large periods of time had passed between attacks in order to lull victims into a false sense of security. His attacks were characterised by extreme violence, with Devine frequently beating his victims with a hammer to subdue them. During one undated period, Devine was convicted and imprisoned for the attempted rape of his sister-in-law, but his attacks resumed after his release from prison.

Devine's final attack took place in early 1987, when he abducted a young woman from a bus stop in Shieldhall Road, dragged her to a railway embankment and raped her for several hours before trying to strangle her. Although badly injured and suffering from hypothermia, the woman survived the attack and managed to flag down a police car, which drove her to the nearby Southern General Hospital. During the drive, the victim provided a description of her attacker, saying that he was about 30 and had a beard. However, in a later interview she made no mention of his having a beard. Based on her description, a facial composite was made depicting the suspect without a beard.

Police had not initially linked Devine's attacks to the same perpetrator. After the final assault, the head of the Govan CID noticed similarities between the incidents and ordered a review of all unsolved rapes since 1979. This resulted in the discovery of seven other women who described being assaulted by a man resembling Devine. After concluding that all eight attacks were perpetrated by a serial rapist, the police appealed for information on the so-called "Beast of Ibrox". The 31-year-old Devine was arrested after multiple people reported that he matched the rapist's description. Although the most recent victim could not identify him, as he had shaved off his beard after raping her to avoid recognition, another woman whom he had raped the previous year was able to pick him out of a police lineup. Devine was charged with the woman's rape and remanded in custody. Over the next few days, Devine was identified by other victims and himself confessed to several of the rapes, including the 1987 attack.

Later that year, Devine appeared at Edinburgh High Court for trial. He was found guilty of four counts of rape, one count of attempted rape, and attempted murder. He was sentenced to life imprisonment, the third time in Scottish history that the sentence was applied to somebody who had been convicted of rape.

== Imprisonment ==
Devine served portions of his sentence at several different prisons. During his imprisonment he was reportedly friendly with infamous Scottish murderer Angus Sinclair.

Initially, Devine was held at Saughton Prison in Edinburgh. After becoming eligible for early release, Devine was controversially given a work placement outside the prison, and was allowed to go free five days a week to help him prepare for life outside prison in the event of his being paroled as part of the "Training for Freedom" program. This led to public anger that dangerous prisoners like Devine were being allowed to leave prison. However, in 2005 an investigation by the Sunday Mail found that Devine and fellow inmate Billy Stewart were exploiting the work release program to smuggle drugs into the prison, and possessed contraband mobile phones that they used to organise drug deals. The two men were removed from the Training for Freedom program but did not face criminal charges.

By 2009, Devine had been transferred to HM Prison Shotts. He was again entered into the Training for Freedom program, having served 23 years of his life sentence, but was once again removed from the program after being caught smuggling drugs into the prison and was transferred to another facility.

Although it was reported in 2017 that Devine had been released, he was in fact still imprisoned at HMP Barlinnie as of 2023.

== Death ==
He died in his cell on 6 August 2023; the Scottish Prison Service confirmed his death on 9 August and announced that it planned to hold a fatal accident inquiry.
