= Isla Bryson case =

Controversial imprisonment of transgender woman

Isla Annie Bryson is a transgender woman from Clydebank, Scotland, who, prior to transitioning in 2020, raped two women, one in 2016 and another in 2019, and was convicted of those offences in 2023. Bryson was charged, and first appeared in court in 2019.

Bryson was remanded to a women's prison while awaiting trial, and segregated from other prisoners pending risk assessment. Following public backlash, she was transferred to a men's prison. The case was used to criticise the Scottish Parliament's passage of the Gender Recognition Reform (Scotland) Bill, despite it having been blocked by the British government (using Section 35 of the Scotland Act 1998).

During the controversy, the Scottish Prison Service announced an "urgent review" into the location of transgender inmates, and announced that trans people would be initially imprisoned according to their assigned sex rather than gender identity, until assessment could determine which was ultimately more appropriate for the individual.

== Background ==
Bryson was born in 1991 and named Adam Binnie Bryson. Bryson married a woman in July 2016 and took on her surname, Graham. In September 2016 and June 2019, Bryson raped two women. One woman testified having met her as Adam Graham on the dating website Badoo. The other woman met Bryson, who was using the name DJ Blade, on Bigo Live.

Bryson appeared in court in July 2019 as Adam Graham, and was charged that year. In 2020, she came out as transgender, and changed her name to Isla Annie Bryson. As of May 2021, her legal name was Annie Bryson, but her legal gender was unchanged. In the 2023 trial, she testified that she knew she was trans since the age of four, Bryson's mother and her estranged wife expressed scepticism about this. Her wife further accused Bryson of stabbing her and attempting to rape her, and said she had been trying to end their marriage for seven years, but had been unable to locate Bryson.

As of February 2023 Bryson was undergoing feminising hormone therapy.

== Enrolment at Ayrshire College ==
In 2021 Bryson, awaiting trial, studied cosmetology at Ayrshire College's campus in Kilwinning for three months, where she went by Annie. Most of her coursemates were younger women. Upon learning of her later rape conviction, three of her course-mates expressed feeling shocked and violated, as she had practised applying spray tan on them as part of a one-day course, during which they had worn little clothing. The college said that it had no knowledge of the charges against her at the time.

Susan Smith of the campaign group For Women Scotland (Note: For Women Scotland is often described as either "gender-critical" or "anti-trans" by various publishers.) called it "terrifying" that Bryson's name change had allowed her to "hide her identities and gain access to young women". The lawyer Thomas Ross said that, under law, people accused of crimes are not obliged to disclose that fact. He called the situation a catch-22 for institutions, that would have to choose between putting other students at risk by allowing that person to attend, or discriminating against someone with the presumption of innocence.

== Trial ==
Bryson was tried at the High Court of Justiciary in Glasgow in January 2023. The prosecution, the advocate depute John Keenan, described how she had "preyed on two vulnerable female partners" after meeting them online. Bryson denied the rape charges, saying the sex had been consensual, and that she was "in no way a predatory male". Bryson's defence, Edward Targowski, argued that she was also vulnerable due being transgender.

Bryson was convicted of the rapes on 24 January 2023, making her the first trans woman known to be convicted of rape in Scotland. The presiding judge, Lord Scott, warned her that a "significant custodial sentence" was inevitable. Following her conviction, Police Scotland declared that Bryson had been arrested and charged as a man, and that her crimes would therefore be recorded as having been committed by a man.

On 28 February 2023 Bryson was sentenced to eight years in prison, with a further three years of supervision upon release. She was also placed on the Violent and Sex Offender Register for life. The court heard reports of Bryson having neurodevelopmental problems. In his summary, Lord Scott said Bryson continued to deny the crimes, and had claimed, without evidence, that the victims had colluded against her:

You see yourself as the victim in this case. But you are not [...] Your vulnerability is no excuse at all for what you did to these two women in 2016 and 2019. Regardless of your own vulnerability, in a period of just under three years, you raped two women who can both be regarded as vulnerable.

== Remand to women's prison ==
From 2014, the Scottish Prison Service (SPS) held a policy that—while allowing for case-by-case consideration and ongoing risk assessments—advised that transgender people should generally be allocated to prisons matching "the new gender in which they are living". While the warrant issued by the Scottish Courts and Tribunal Service (SCTS) called for Bryson to be taken to HM Prison Barlinnie, a men's prison in Glasgow, the SPS was not bound by it and detained her at HM Prison Cornton Vale in Stirling, Scotland's sole women-only prison, where she was segregated from other prisoners. Per the SPS's report, Bryson did not have any contact with the other prisoners during her time at Cornton Vale, and thus did not pose any risk to them.

A Freedom of Information request by The Times reported that, in October 2022, there were a total of 19 transgender prisoners in Scotland, 12 of whom began transitioning while in prison.

=== Reactions ===
Bryson's imprisonment in a woman's prison sparked debate and concerns about the safety of the other prisoners.

Sandy Brindley, the chief executive of Rape Crisis Scotland, said "It cannot be right for a rapist to be in a women's prison", while concerns were also expressed by 10 Downing Street, where a spokesman for Prime Minister Rishi Sunak compared the case with the situation in England and Wales, where "transgender women must go through a robust risk assessment that factors in their offending history and anatomy before they can be moved to a women's prison".

Dominic Raab, the Secretary of State for Justice, said a similar incident would not happen in England and Wales, where a recent change in the law would shortly be implemented to prevent trans women convicted of sex offences against women, as well as any who had not undergone bottom surgery, from being detained in a women's prison, apart from in exceptional circumstances authorised by the minister. Yvette Cooper, the Shadow Home Secretary, said "this dangerous rapist should not be in a women's prison". Keith Brown, the Scottish Cabinet Secretary for Justice, told MSPs he trusted the Scottish Prison Service to decide where Bryson should be held: "The facts of the matter are that the Scottish Prison Service has a long track record – I'm talking 20 years and more – of assessing risks within our prisons, including those presented by the presence of trans prisoners – both for the trans prisoners themselves and other prisoners."

==== Gender Recognition Reform Bill ====
Bryson's conviction came several weeks after the Scottish Parliament passed the Gender Recognition Reform (Scotland) Bill, designed to allow trans people in Scotland to more easily change their legal sex. The bill's opponents pointed to the Bryson case, and questioned whether it contained a sufficient level of safeguarding for women in prison. The bill would have precluded anyone with a sexual harm prevention order or sexual offences prevention order from obtaining a Gender Recognition Certificate.

The UK government subsequently blocked the bill under the Scotland Act 1998, citing the alleged potential for predatory men to use the legislation to access women-only spaces for malicious purposes. Nicola Sturgeon, First Minister of Scotland, denied such a risk, and accused the UK government of attacking Scottish democracy and trying to fuel a culture war. The policy analyst Lucy Hunter Blackburn addressed the Scottish Equalities Committee and warned the bill could lead to legal challenges and suggested it be amended to exempt prisons from recognising the trans status of prisoners.

== Move to a men's prison ==
On 26 January 2023 Sturgeon commented on the case at First Minister's Questions after the Scottish Conservatives leader, Douglas Ross, raised the issue. Sturgeon confirmed that Bryson would not serve her sentence at Cornton Vale, saying "There is no automatic right for a trans woman convicted of a crime to serve their sentence in a female prison even if they have a gender recognition certificate. Every case is subject to rigorous individual risk assessment and the safety of other prisoners is paramount." She also confirmed the Gender Recognition Reform Bill had no bearing on Bryson's case. Under Sturgeon's orders, Bryson was moved to a men's wing of HM Prison Edinburgh later the same day. In First Minister's Questions on 2 February, Sturgeon agreed with Ross's claim that Bryson was "almost certainly" lying about being transgender, as an "easy way out".

Rhona Hotchkiss, a former governor of Cornton Vale prison, described the decision to send a convicted rapist to a women's prison as an "unnecessary shambles".

== Aftermath ==
Following the decision to move Bryson to a men's prison, speculation arose of a potential blanket rule against accommodating transgender prisoners, after Sturgeon agreed with comments made by the Rape Crisis Scotland executive Sandy Brindley in a 27 January episode of The News Agents podcast. Vic Valentine of the campaign group Scottish Trans Alliance expressed concern that such a blanket rule would place many trans women at substantial risk if they were sent to a men's prison, but agreed that sex offenders who pose significant risk to women should not be housed with other female prisoners.

On 29 January 2023, following public backlash over the Bryson case as well as that of Tiffany Scott, a trans woman convicted of stalking a 13-year-old girl, who had successfully transferred to a women's facility, the SPS announced it would pause movements of all transgender prisoners while it carried out an "urgent review" into their locations. On 9 February it announced that trans prisoners in Scotland would initially be housed according to their assigned sex at birth, after which their case would be assessed to determine whether it would be suitable to accommodate them in a men's or women's facility. On the Bryson case, the report said the Scottish Prison Service's procedures had been followed, but that the SPS had received "conflicting and limited information" about Bryson beyond her immediate convictions, and recommended a "shared justice process" for the future admission of transgender people to prison. The report also confirmed that Bryson did not have any contact with the other prisoners during her time at Cornton Vale, and therefore did not pose a risk to them.

On 27 February 2023, regulations in England and Wales came into force banning transgender women "with their male genitalia intact", or those who are sex offenders, from being sent to women's prisons.

On 3 July 2023, Sky News reported that Bryson had written to the Sunday Mail to say that prison was "full of transphobic people" after a man was charged with threatening behaviour against her. Police Scotland confirmed that they had attended the prison on 8 June, and that a 24-year-old man had been charged over the incident. In another letter to the Sunday Mail in April 2024, she claimed to have received an apology from the Scottish Prison Service after a female prison officer misgendered her.

On 5 December 2023, the Scottish Prison Service issued new guidelines on transgender prisoners, stating that trans women who have hurt women or girls would not be sent to a female prison unless there were "exceptional" circumstances.

In September 2024, Jo Farrell, the Chief Constable of Police Scotland, said the force would not record a male rapist as female, telling Sky News "You can only commit that crime as a man". However, it was later reported that Police Scotland had considered recording Bryson as female. The matter was subsequently raised at Holyrood, where the Scottish Conservatives suggested Police Scotland had "serious questions to answer" over the proposal.

=== Media coverage ===
Gina Gwenffrewi argues that the media coverage of the Isla Bryson case, particularly that of the three major newspapers The Guardian, The Times, and the Daily Mail, contributed to the othering of trans women by "presenting them as posing a predatory threat in women's spaces".

== See also ==
- Kim Marie Johansson
- Amber McLaughlin
- Tiffany Scott (prisoner)
- Karen White case
