= HM Prison Inverness =

Prison in Inverness, Scotland

Coordinates: 57°28′28″N 4°13′17″W

HMP Inverness
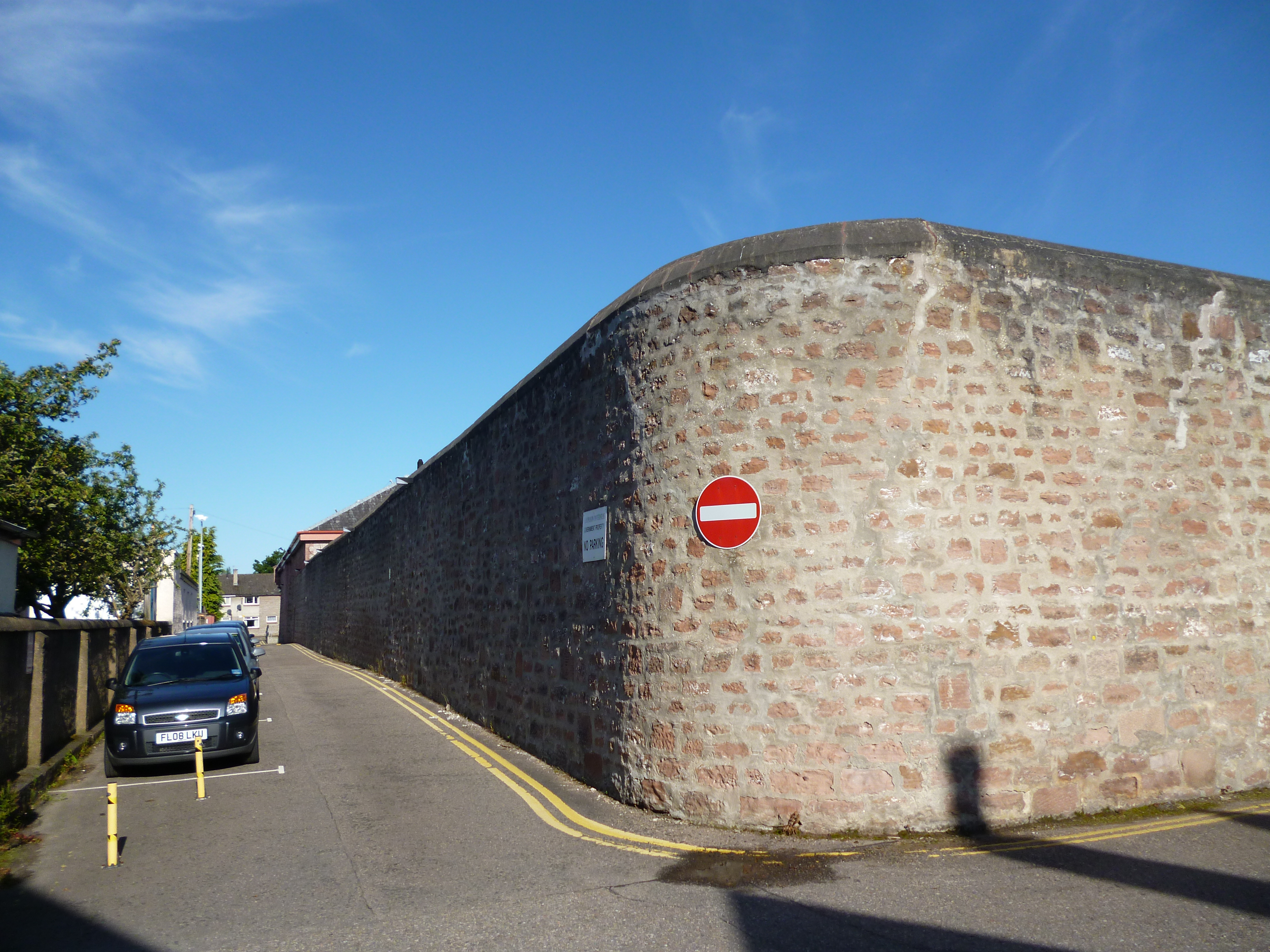
- Interactive map of HMP Inverness
- Location: Inverness, Highland
- Status: Operational
- Capacity: 110
- Opened: 1902
- Managed by: Scottish Prison Service
- Governor: Scott Watson

HM Prison Inverness, also known as Porterfield Prison (Prìosan Uch a' Phortair), is located in the Crown area of Inverness, Scotland, and serves the courts of the Highlands and Islands. It covers all the courts in the Western Isles as well as courts from Fort William, Wick and Elgin. The prison houses both adult and young remand prisoners, convicted adults serving up to four years, and other prisoners awaiting to go to another prison or needing management support, tending to be serving long sentences up to life imprisonment.

The prison in October 2024 was governed by Scott Watson; designed to hold 103 prisoners, the average population was 117.

Gangster Jimmy Boyle was a notorious prisoner at Porterfield, severely disruptive and often in the "cages" whose only facility was a concrete block to sleep on. His life was transformed after he was transferred to the "special unit" in Barlinnie Prison, where he was rehabilitated and became a respected artist after his release.

== Redevelopment plans ==
As of 2016, due to insufficient capacity at HMP Inverness, the Scottish Prison Service announced its intention to build a new prison near Milton of Leys.

In June 2016 after significant opposition from local residents the Scottish Prison Service suspended the consultation on the Milton of Leys site to assess an alternative option.

In 2021, the Scottish Government confirmed its intention to proceed with a new HM Prison Highland to replace HM Prison Inverness, shortlisting four major construction companies for the contract. As of October 2024 the Scottish Prison Service website listed HMP Inverness as active.
