= HM Prison Peterhead =

Former prison in Peterhead, Scotland

HMP Peterhead
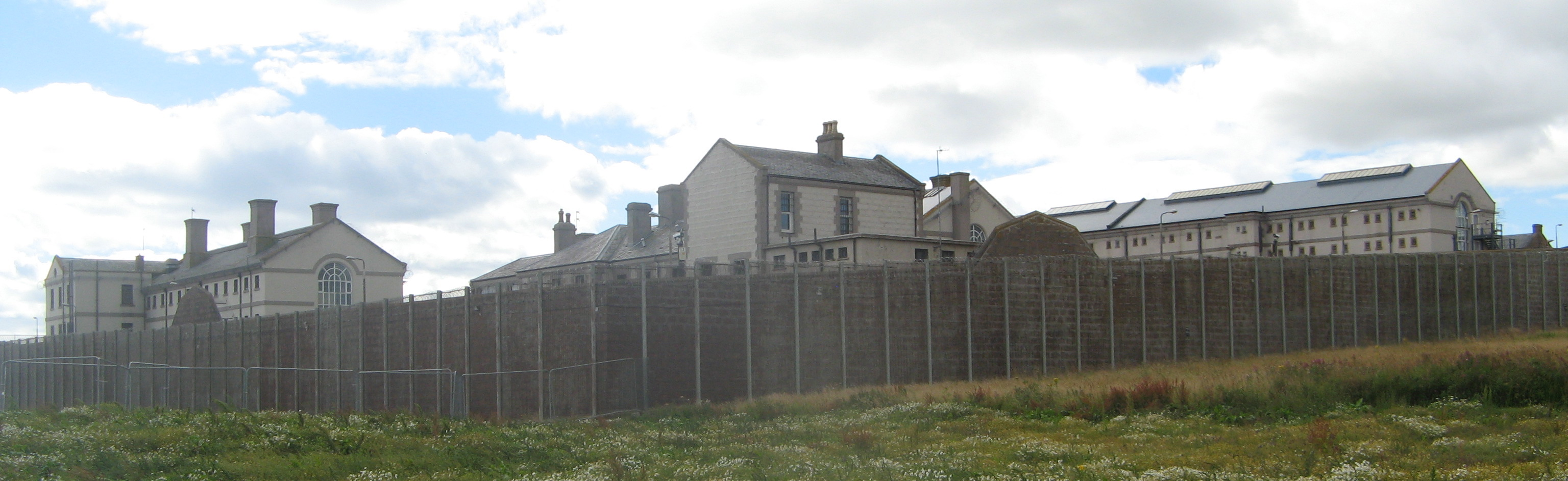
- Interactive map of HMP Peterhead
- Location: Peterhead, Scotland, UK; 57°29′24″N 1°47′14″W
- Status: Historical museum
- Capacity: 152 (February 2012)
- Opened: 1888
- Closed: 2013
- Managed by: Scottish Prison Service
- Governor: Michael Hebden

HMP Peterhead was a prison in Peterhead in Aberdeenshire, Scotland, operating from 1888 to 2013. Since June 2016, the former grounds operate as the Peterhead Prison Museum.

== History ==
Peterhead Convict Prison was built around 1888. It was designed to hold 208 prisoners and to be Scotland's only convict prison, i.e. for prisoners sentenced to 'hard labour'. Occupancy averaged at around 350 however, until peaking at 455 in 1911. Additional buildings were completed in 1909, 1960 and 1962, bringing capacity up to 362. According to the Scottish Prison Service, the prison could, in 2012, accommodate up to 142 prisoners.

It closed in 2013, to be replaced by the new HMP Grampian, the first prison in Scotland to jointly house youths, men and women. The first inmates transferred on to site on 2 March 2014 having been temporarily housed at other sites and connected to family with virtual visits by videolink.

Until the opening of Peterhead Convict Prison, Scots convicts were transported to England to serve their sentences. The first convicts were received in August 1888.

Peterhead supplied the labour force to work in Stirlinghill Quarry and in the Admiralty Yard attached to the prison. These convicts supported the work of a civilian labour force employed by the Admiralty to construct the Harbour of Refuge breakwater.

The Admiralty project was unique in Scotland as it was served by the only state-owned passenger-carrying railway in its day.

== Riot ==
On 28 September 1987, a riot in the prison's D wing resulted in prisoners taking over the building and taking a prison officer, 56-year-old Jackie Stuart, hostage. The rioters were serving life in prison for violent crimes. It was thought that they had nothing to lose and would not hesitate to make good on their threats to kill their hostage, whom they had taken up to the rafters. When negotiations broke down, the then-Home Secretary, Douglas Hurd, dispatched the SAS to bring the riot to an end on 3 October. The operation was successful. The hostage was released unharmed and order in the prison was restored.

== Facilities ==
Peterhead Prison had a history of poor conditions for prisoners, being referred to as "Scotland's gulag, a prison of no hope." A 2005 inspection reported that electricity had only just been made available in all the cells and slopping out continued at the prison. HMP Peterhead was a specialist centre for sex offenders.

Talks on replacing the prison with a new one began in 2006. They were revived in November 2006. Demolition of part of the prison began on 13 February 2012, with the opening of the new HMP Grampian planned for winter 2013/14. The prison closed on 6 December 2013. The new facility can hold about 500 male and female prisoners – both adults and young offenders – from the Northern Community Justice Authority catchment area.

== Filming location ==
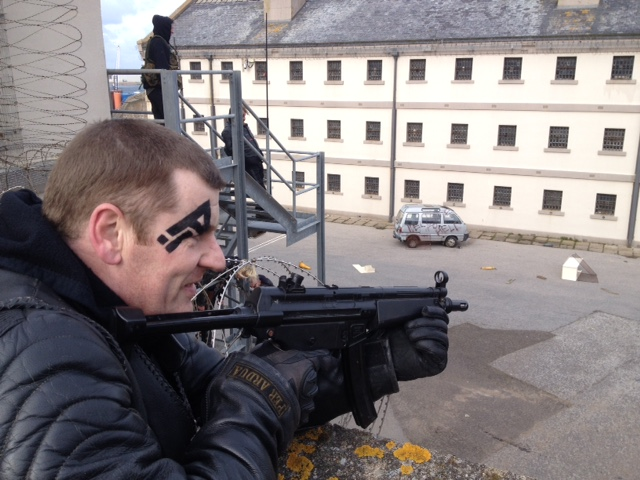
Actors on the roof of the prison during the filming of Redcon-1 around 2018

In 2016, Peterhead Prison was used as a filming location for the 2018 British zombie action film Redcon-1.

In January 2022 the prison again became a filming location for Channel 4 series Screw, an STV Studios produced prison drama starring Derry Girls actress Jamie-Lee O'Donnell and The Bill and Killing Eve actress Nina Sosanya. It was confirmed the show has been picked up for a second series.

== Museum ==
The building now serves as the Peterhead Prison Museum which provides an Audio Guided Tour of cells, exercise areas, kitchens, laundry, hospital and ancillary rooms. There is a small first-floor cafeteria. The museum is run by Cove Attractions Ltd who also own Shrewsbury and Shepton Mallet Prisons.
