= HM Prison Glenochil =

Scottish prison

Coordinates: 56.14238°N 3.81791°W

HMP Glenochil
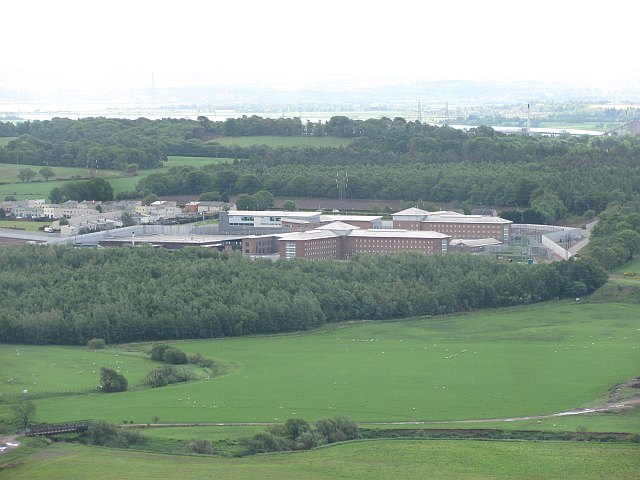
- Interactive map of HMP Glenochil
- Location: near Tullibody, Scotland
- Status: Operational
- Security class: Mixed-classification, All Male
- Capacity: 670
- Population: 668 (May 2010)
- Opened: 1966
- Managed by: Scottish Prison Service
- Governor: Sharanne Findlay

HMP Glenochil is a prison located near Tullibody, Scotland. It houses male offenders of High, Medium and Low security classifications. The prison does not accept prisoners directly from the courts but commits prisoners who have been previously convicted and located in other prisons, primarily HMP Perth, HMP Edinburgh, HMP Barlinnie and HMP Grampian. The prison has a design capacity of 670 prisoners and in May 2010 held 668 prisoners (284 short-term, 384 long-term). The governor is Sharanne Findlay.

== History ==
Glenochil was first opened in 1966 as a Detention Centre on land which was purchased from the Coal Board. It was extended in 1975 to become a Young Offender's Institution and Detention Centre. In the 1980s it began holding long-term prisoners and in 2007 began accepting short term prisoners.
