= Kilmarnock (disambiguation) =

Kilmarnock is a burgh in East Ayrshire, Scotland.

Kilmarnock may also refer to:

== Objects ==
- Kilmarnock volume, the first edition of poet Robert Burns' work
- Kilmarnock bonnet obsolete name for Balmoral bonnet or pillbox hat

== Peerage ==
- Baron Kilmarnock, a title in the Peerage of the United Kingdom
- Earl of Kilmarnock, a title in the Peerage of the United Kingdom

== Places ==
- Kilmarnock, a community in Montague, Ontario, Canada
- Kilmarnock, Virginia, a town in Lancaster County, Virginia, United States
- Kilmarnock Academy, a comprehensive school in Kilmarnock, Scotland
- Kilmarnock (HM Prison), a prison near Kilmarnock, Scotland
- Kilmarnock railway station, a railway station in Kilmarnock, Scotland

== Politics ==
- Kilmarnock (UK Parliament constituency), a constituency of the UK House of Commons from 1918 to 1983
- Kilmarnock Burghs (UK Parliament constituency), a constituency of the UK House of Commons from 1832 to 1918
- Kilmarnock and Loudoun (UK Parliament constituency), a constituency of the UK House of Commons
- Kilmarnock and Loudoun (Scottish Parliament constituency), a constituency of the Scottish Parliament

== Sport ==
- F.C. Kilmarnock Ladies, a Scottish women's football club
- Kilmarnock F.C., a Scottish football club
- Kilmarnock RFC, a Scottish rugby union club
- Kilmarnock (Barassie) Golf Club, a Scottish golf club
