= Lady Martha Bruce =

British aristocrat, prison governor (1921–2023)

Lieutenant-Colonel Lady Martha Bruce OBE TD DL
- Born: 7 November 1921; Limekilns, Fife, Scotland
- Died: 22 January 2023 (aged 101)
- Military career
- Allegiance: United Kingdom
- Branch: British Army
- Service years: 1941–1968
- Rank: Lieutenant-Colonel
- Service number: 282096
- Unit: Women's Royal Army Corps
- Conflicts: World War II
- Awards: Order of the British Empire; Territorial Decoration

Lieutenant-Colonel Lady Martha Veronica Bruce OBE TD DL (7 November 1921 – 22 January 2023) was a British aristocrat, prison governor and Women's Royal Army Corps officer.

== Early life and family ==
Bruce was born on 7 November 1921 in Limekilns, Fife, she was the eldest of six children of Edward Bruce, 10th Earl of Elgin and 14th Earl of Kincardine, chief of Clan Bruce, and Katherine Elizabeth Cochrane. She was raised at the family seat, Broomhall House, near Limekilns. When she was a child, her parents entertained King George V and Queen Mary with the Duke and Duchess of York at Broomhall. After this visit, the Bruce children's governess, Marion Crawford, went to work for the Yorks, raising the future Queen Elizabeth II. Her younger siblings included Andrew Bruce, 11th Earl of Elgin and 15th Earl of Kincardine, and the Hon. James Bruce.

Bruce was educated at Downham School, where she was head girl. After leaving Downham, she took dancing and deportment lessons at Madame Vacani's school in Knightsbridge in preparation for her coming out season. She and her sister had a debutante ball at Claridge's.

== Career ==
During World War II, Lady Martha joined the Auxiliary Territorial Service in 1941. She later joined an anti-aircraft battery defending London during the Blitz. After the war, she went on to command the WRAC Battalion supporting 51st (Highland) Division in Perth in the 1960s, rising to the rank of lieutenant-colonel.

In May 1949, she served as a maid of honour during the Duke and Duchess of Gloucester's stay at the Palace of Holyroodhouse during the Duke's term as Lord High Commissioner to the General Assembly of the Church of Scotland. She was also briefly a lady-in-waiting to the Princess Royal in 1965.

In 1968, after leaving the army, she joined the Scottish prison service, first as assistant governor of HM Prison Greenock. When HM Prison Cornton Vale opened in 1975 she became its first governor. She retired in 1983. She returned to Cornton Vale in 2015 for its 40th anniversary, planting a tree to mark the occasion.

Bruce maintained an interest in prisons and was active in philanthropy, notably the Perth and Kinross branch of the SSAFA. She was appointed a deputy lieutenant of Fife in 1987. To mark her 100th birthday in 2021, Fife Council installed benches in Charlestown, Limekilns and Pattiesmuir.

Bruce lived her whole life in Limekilns, renting a small house on the Broomhall estate. She died on 22 January 2023, at the age of 101.
