= Murder of Margaret Fleming =

Scottish murder victim

Margaret Fleming
- Born: 1 November 1980; Inverclyde, Scotland
- Died: December 1999/January 2000; Inverkip, Inverclyde, Scotland
- Cause of death: Homicide (manner undetermined)
- Known for: Murder victim

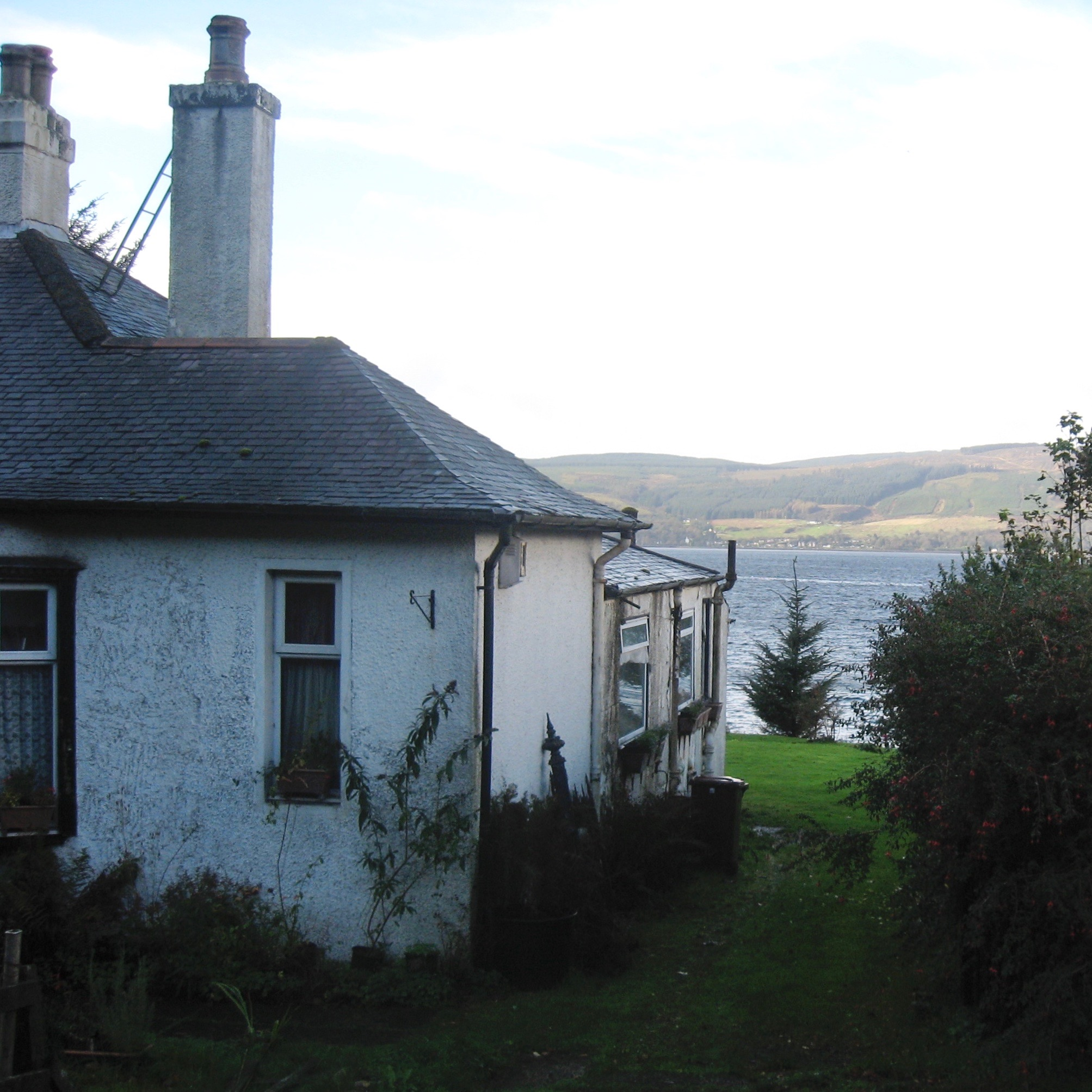
"Seacroft", Inverkip, from the A78

Margaret Fleming (1 November 1980 – c. December 1999/January 2000) was a Scottish woman who was murdered by her nominated caregivers Edward Cairney (1941–2023) and Avril Jones (1960–2026) in the village of Inverkip, Inverclyde, Scotland. The case was one of a murder conviction without a body.

== Background ==
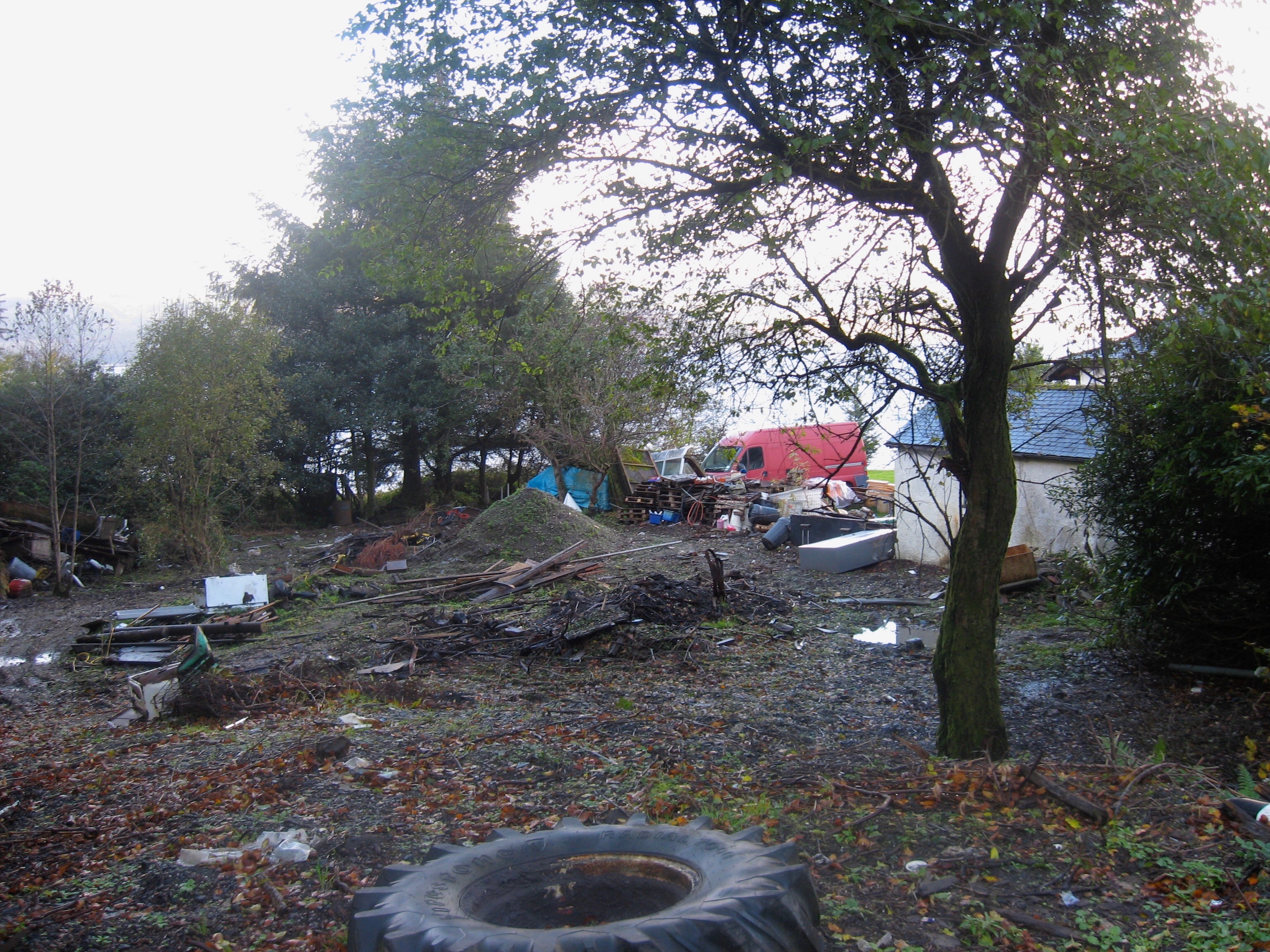
By 2011 the garden and adjacent ground to the south of Seacroft were littered with junk.

Margaret Fleming was born on 1 November 1980. She had learning difficulties which had been identified at a young age. After her father died in 1995, she went to live with his close friends Edward Cairney and Avril Jones, whom he had named as her guardians in his will. Fleming moved in with the couple at their bungalow "Seacroft" in Inverkip; they became her full-time caregivers, with Jones managing Fleming's disability benefits.

In 2016, changes to the social security system meant that Fleming was required to reapply for disability benefits. Jones completed an application form for new benefits on Fleming's behalf which raised concern. It was then discovered that no one from social services had been in contact with Fleming for 17 years. When neither the Department for Work and Pensions nor social workers were able to contact her, Police Scotland visited the couple's home. Unable to locate Fleming, the police launched a missing person investigation.

== Investigation and outcome ==
Upon investigation, it was discovered that the last independent sighting of Margaret Fleming had been on 17 December 1999, when she had accompanied Cairney and Jones on a visit to Jones's brother at his house. The following week she was not present with the couple at a family Christmas dinner. On 5 January 2000, Jones told her mother that Fleming had left with a member of the travelling community.

While still under investigation in 2017, Cairney and Jones agreed to be interviewed by reporters from BBC and STV. In these interviews they claimed that Fleming was still alive and had recently been in contact with them. Jones said that she had been going to attend a benefit assessment with Fleming, who had refused to go, pushed her over and run away. Cairney also said that Fleming had been travelling around Europe with members of the travelling community, using a fake passport and going by several aliases. He said she had been in Poland and was working as a gangmaster, hiring agricultural workers in the south of England, and she was involved in the illegal drugs trade. Cairney and Jones also claimed that Fleming would occasionally return home to receive her disability benefit money from them.

The couple appeared at the High Court in Glasgow in 2018, charged with murder. The prosecution case alleged that Fleming was killed by the couple between 18 December 1999 and 5 January 2000, that the murder had been concealed and that Jones had continued to receive Fleming's benefits.

Following the trial, Cairney and Jones were both convicted in 2019 of Margaret Fleming's murder and of perverting the course of justice on majority jury verdicts. They were each given a life sentence, to serve a minimum of 14 years before being able to apply for parole. Jones was also unanimously convicted of fraud and ordered to pay back £182,000 of benefits which had been claimed in Fleming's name. Despite a painstaking search of their dilapidated property and its junk-filled garden, no trace of Fleming's body has ever been found.

The police investigation and subsequent murder trial were the subject of the BBC two-part documentary Murder Trial: The Disappearance of Margaret Fleming, broadcast in January 2020.

Cairney died in HMP Edinburgh on 15 October 2023, aged 82. Jones died in HMP Stirling on 08 November 2026, aged 66.

== "Seacroft" ==
"Seacroft", the bungalow where Fleming lived with Cairney and Jones, stood on the coast beside the A78 road, about 500 metres (550 yd) to the south of the village. The property was sold in 2017. Planning permission was given in January 2020 to build two new houses on the site, and the bungalow was demolished two months later.

== See also ==
- List of solved missing person cases (post-2000)
- List of murder convictions without a body
