= HM Prison Barlinnie =

Prison in Riddrie, Glasgow, Scotland

HMP Barlinnie
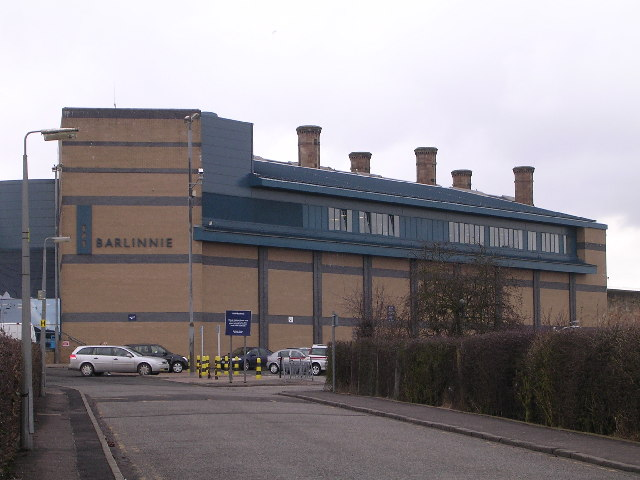
- Interactive map of HMP Barlinnie
- Location: Riddrie, Glasgow; 55°52′10″N 4°10′55″W
- Status: Operational
- Capacity: 1018
- Population: 1600 (approx)
- Opened: 1882
- Managed by: Scottish Prison Service
- Governor: Michael Stoney
- Website: sps.gov.uk/prisons/barlinnie

HM Prison Barlinnie is the largest prison in Scotland. It is operated by the Scottish Prison Service and is located in the residential suburb of Riddrie, in the northeast of Glasgow, Scotland. It is informally known locally as The Big Hoose, Bar and Bar-L. In 2018, plans for its closure were announced.

== History ==
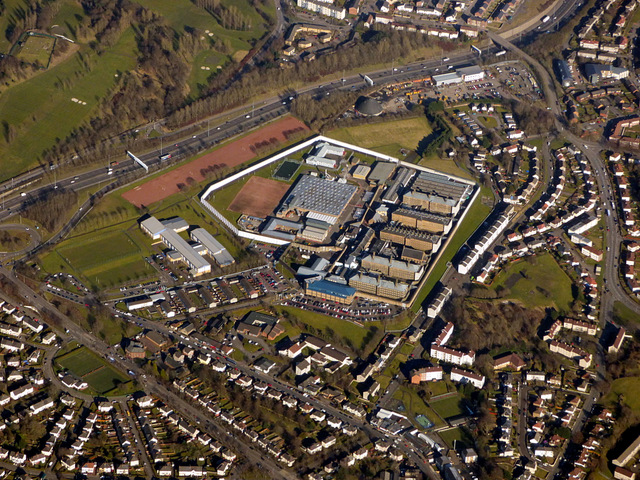
Aerial view of the prison (2018) showing its proximity to Smithycroft Secondary School and housing

Barlinnie was designed by Major General Thomas Bernard Collinson, architect and engineer to the Scottish Prison Department, and it was built in the then rural area of Riddrie adjacent to the Monkland Canal (now the route of the M8 motorway), first opening with the commissioning of A hall in July 1882.

Barlinnie prison's five accommodation halls: A, B, C, D and E, were built in stages between 1882 and 1897, with each holding approximately 69 inmates.

There was a major extension to the perimeter in 1967 to create an industrial compound. From 1973 till 1994, the world-famous "Special Unit" placed emphasis on rehabilitation, the best known success story being that of reformed Glasgow gangster Jimmy Boyle. Cultural output associated with the Special Unit included Boyle's autobiography, A Sense of Freedom (1977); The Hardman (1977), the play Boyle wrote with Tom McGrath; a body of sculpture; and The Silent Scream (1979), a book of prose and poems by Larry Winters, who committed suicide in 1977.

=== Capital punishment ===
A total of 10 judicial executions by hanging took place at HMP Barlinnie between 1946 and 1960, replacing the gallows at Duke Street Prison before the final abolition of capital punishment in the United Kingdom for murder in 1969:

Date	Name	Age (years)	Executioner
8 February 1946	John Lyon	21	Thomas Pierrepoint
6 April 1946	Patrick Carraher	39	Thomas Pierrepoint
10 August 1946	John Caldwell	20	Albert Pierrepoint
30 October 1950	Christopher Harris	28	Albert Pierrepoint
16 December 1950	James Robertson	33	Albert Pierrepoint
12 April 1952	James Smith	22	Albert Pierrepoint
29 May 1952	Patrick Gallagher Deveney	42	Albert Pierrepoint
26 January 1953	George Francis Shaw	25	Albert Pierrepoint
11 July 1958	Peter Manuel	31	Harry Allen
22 December 1960	Anthony Miller	19	Harry Allen

Each of the condemned men had been convicted of murder. All the executions took place at 8.00 am. As was the custom, the remains of all executed prisoners were the property of the state, and were therefore buried in unmarked graves within the walls of the prison. During the D hall renovations of 1997, the prison gallows cell (built into D-hall) was finally demolished and the remains of all the executed prisoners were exhumed for reburial elsewhere.

=== Escapes ===
The first man to escape from Barlinnie was John Dobbie, three days after being sentenced to 15 years for a violent robbery in 1985. Dobbie escaped inside a laundry van; he was captured by armed police five days later and was sentenced to a further five years.

== Current use ==
Today Barlinnie is the largest prison in Scotland, holding just under 1,400 prisoners although it has a design capacity of 987. The prison currently receives prisoners from the courts in the West of Scotland as well as retaining male remand prisoners and prisoners serving less than 4-year sentences. It also allocates suitable prisoners from its convicted population to lower security prisons, including HMP Low Moss and HMP Greenock, as well as holding long-term prisoners in the initial phase of their sentence prior to transfer to long-term prisons such as HMP Glenochil, HMP Shotts, HMP Kilmarnock or HMP Grampian.

Barlinnie prison still consists of five accommodation halls with each holding approximately 200 inmates and an additional National Top End Facility (Letham Hall) housing long term prisoners nearing the end of their incarceration. All five accommodation halls were refurbished between 1997 and 2004. There is also a hospital unit with accommodation for 18 prisoners, which includes eight cells specially designed for suicide supervision. A new administration and visiting block was completed in 1999.

The in-cell bucket-as-toilet routine known as slopping out was still in practice there as late as 2003. Since 2001, refurbishment has taken place after critical reports by the Scottish Chief Inspector of Prisons.

In October 2018, it was announced that HMP Barlinnie is to be sold and replaced with a new superjail within Glasgow or its outskirts.

In 2019, local MP Paul Sweeney proposed that the historic prison buildings be saved from demolition and converted into a prison museum after it is decommissioned.

In January 2020, the Prison Service announced that the proposed site for the replacement prison was a 22-hectare (54-acre) site formerly occupied by Provan Gas Works.

As at February 2025 the prison was operating at 140% capacity with 1,400 prisoners, and was scheduled to have additional prisoner releases to relieve over-crowding.

In December 2025, Historic Environment Scotland granted the site Category A listed building status. The listing covers some of the earliest parts of the site, including five accommodation halls, the chapel, the former infirmary and store building, the gatehouse, work sheds and parts of a boundary wall. In May 2026, the Scottish Prison Service announced their decision to appeal against the listing, on the grounds that it would hinder the redevelopment of the site. Hearings were expected to take place in July.

== Research ==
Cooperation between the prison authorities, the prisoners and third parties has resulted in the production of research materials suggesting the following conclusions:

(2010) Alcohol is blamed by the majority of youths (av age 18.5 years) for their committing serious harm to others (base study 172 persons) by the use of weapons (mostly knives). 90% of the study group were in Barlinnie for committing serious harm to others (i.e. not crimes of dishonesty). Most were gang members.

== Notable former inmates ==
- Paul Ferris – Glasgow Gangland figure
- Jimmy Boyle
- Hugh Collins – died 14 August 2021 aged 70. Glasgow Gangland figure, once dubbed Scotland's most dangerous prisoner, author and sculptor, married Caroline McNairn
- Duncan Ferguson
- Peter Manuel
- Abdelbaset al-Megrahi – Lockerbie bomber (died of cancer in 2012)
- Tommy Sheridan – Scottish politician
- Dominic Devine – serial rapist, died 6 August 2023
