= HM Prison Highland =

Future prison

Coordinates: 57.480083°N 4.182551°W

HM Prison Highland is a prison under construction in the Highlands of Scotland. Originally anticipated to open in 2020, it is expected to replace HM Prison Inverness in 2027.

== History ==
In November 2022, the construction costs rose to £140 million. By 2024, the completion date was delayed to 2026 and the cost increased to over £200M; over four times the original budget. In June 2026, it was revealed the prison was further delayed to spring 2027.

In August 2024, workers uncovered a 2,000 year old prehistoric settlement.

== See also ==
- List of prisons in the United Kingdom
