= Milton of Leys =

Coordinates: 57.4519099°N 4.173413°W

Milton of Leys: Scottish Gaelic: Baile Muilinn an Leigheis; Scots: Milton o' Leys
- Suburb
- Location within the Inverness area
- Population: 3,160 (2020)
- Council area: Highland
- Country: Scotland
- Sovereign state: United Kingdom
- Postcode district: IV2 6
- UK Parliament: Inverness, Skye and West Ross-shire
- Scottish Parliament: Inverness and Nairn

Milton of Leys (Scottish Gaelic: Baile Muilinn an Leigheis, meaning The Town of the Mill of Leys) is an area of the city of Inverness in the Highland council area of Scotland. It lies on high ground overlooking the Moray Firth, 3 miles (5 km) southeast of the city centre, to the west of the A9 road.

Since the 1990s, Milton of Leys has developed largely as a residential settlement. Construction of a local primary school began in June 2010, opening in August 2011. Previously, pupils attended at the nearby Inshes Primary.

Housing development has continued throughout the 21st century, with Milton of Leys being one of the city's fastest growing areas.
