= Scots law on murder =

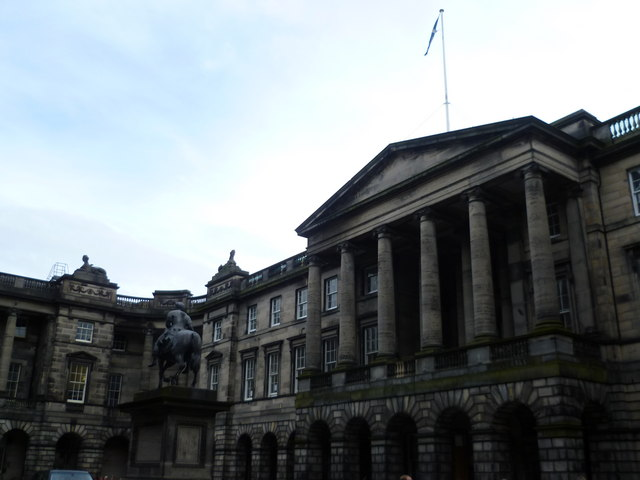
Scottish Law Courts

Scots law on murder is understood as the unlawful killing of another person, with the required mental state. This mental state must be one of two kinds: wicked intention to kill, or wicked recklessness.

== Wicked intention to kill ==
In Drury v HM Advocate it was held that intention to kill must be ‘wicked’. ‘Wicked’ does not mean premeditated. Rather it means that there are no legally relevant factors that justify or excuse it, such as self-defence or provocation.

== Wicked recklessness ==
The alternative mental state for murder is wicked recklessness. This requires both intention to cause physical injury and wicked disregard to whether the victim lives or dies. This point was first raised in the case of HM Advocate v Purcell, where a motorist, who was driving extremely dangerously, knocked down a child, causing injuries which the child subsequently died from. The court found that the accused could not be convicted of murder, because the driver did not intend to harm the child.

== Punishment ==
The Criminal Procedure (Scotland) Act 1995, section 205 states that conviction of murder results in a sentence of life imprisonment.

== Partial defences to murder in Scotland ==
Voluntary culpable homicide is when the requirements of murder are satisfied, but the accused has a partial defence of either provocation or suffering from diminished responsibility. If the partial defences are successful, this does not result in full acquittal. Instead, the accused’s conviction is reduced from murder to culpable homicide, which is a lesser conviction.

=== Diminished responsibility ===
s.51B(1) of the Criminal Procedure (Scotland) Act 1995 provides that diminished responsibility means that a person who would otherwise be convicted of murder will be convicted of culpable homicide instead when, at the time, that person’s ability to determine or control their conduct was “substantially impaired by reason of abnormality of mind”. ‘Abnormality of mind’ includes, but is not limited to, mental disorders. However, the provision made clear that voluntarily being under the influence of alcohol or drugs is not sufficient to be the basis for diminished responsibility.

=== Provocation ===
Where a person kills another person because they were provoked to do so, they will be convicted of culpable homicide rather than murder. The killing in retaliation must occur immediately after the provocation. This prevents premeditated murder as revenge from being covered. Violence is one type of acceptable provocation, and the accused’s reaction must be proportionate to the victim’s provocative act of violence. This is clear in the case of Thomson v HM Advocate, where the reaction of the accused repeatedly stabbing the victim in retaliation to the victim trying to stop him from leaving a room was found to be grossly disproportionate, and provocation could not be used as a partial defence. Sexual infidelity, or confession of adultery is the other kind of acceptable provocation, and is open to be used as a partial defence within any relationship where there is an expectation of sexual infidelity. It is not limited to those who are married.

== See also ==
- Murder in English law
