= Slopping out =

Manual emptying of human waste from prison cells

Slopping out is the manual emptying of human waste when prison cells are unlocked in the morning. Inmates without a flush toilet in the cell have to use other means (formerly a chamber pot, then a bucket, now often a chemical toilet) while locked in during the night. The reason that some cells in UK prisons do not have toilets is that they date from the Victorian era and were therefore not designed with plumbing. As a result, there is no space in which to put a toilet, together with the expense and difficulty of installing the necessary pipes.

== Dirty protest ==
During the late 1970s, Provisional IRA volunteers protested against conditions of internment at HM Prison Maze by refusing to slop out and instead smearing their faeces on the cell walls. This was later referred to as the dirty protest, part of several acts of disobedience within the "H-Blocks" culminating in the 1981 Irish Hunger Strike.

== Phasing out ==
Slopping out was allegedly abolished in England and Wales by 1996, although Private Eye in 2011 reported that Prisons Inspector Nick Hardwick stated that it still persisted at HMP Gloucester.

It was scheduled to be abolished in Scotland by 1999. Due to budget restraints the abolition was delayed, and by 2004 prisoners in five of Scotland's sixteen prisons still had to slop out. Slopping out ended in HM Young Offenders Institution Polmont in 2007, leaving HM Prison Peterhead as the last Scottish prison where prisoners did not have access to plumbing; 300 prisoners had to use chemical toilets due to the difficulty of installing modern plumbing in the prison's granite structure. Peterhead ultimately closed in December 2013.

Slopping out is still in practice in prisons in the Republic of Ireland. Speaking at the launch of the Irish Human Rights Commission's Annual Report for 2009, the Green Party Junior Minister for Integration Mary White said it was time to move on from the Victorian practice. Slopping out was eradicated in Dublin's Mountjoy Prison by the end of 2013 and in Cork Prison in 2016. However, the practice continues at Limerick Prison.

== Other ==
A "potwalloper" was a trusty prisoner who made sure the buckets were emptied and cleaned each morning. He did not do the cleaning himself, but he was responsible for making sure that other prisoners did.

== See also ==
- Manual scavenging, a system of emptying "dry" toilets
- Bucket toilet
