= HM Prison Stirling =

Prison in Stirling, Scotland

Coordinates: 56°8′28″N 3°56′53″W

HM Prison and Young Offender Institution Stirling is a prison facility in Stirling, Scotland, intended to replace HMP Cornton Vale. Opened in 2023, it is Scotland's primary facility for incarcerated women and is designed to offer improved treatment for women in custody, and is notable in not utilising traditional penal designs such as bars on windows and cell doors, taking influence from trauma-informed care.

In May 2025, the prison was named as one of the winners of the annual Royal Incorporation of Architects in Scotland (RIAS) awards, and thereby longlisted for the RIAS Best Building in Scotland Award. The judges described it as "a model of how public buildings can be both operationally robust and deeply humane". It also received a RIBA National Award.
