= Stenhouse, Edinburgh =

Suburb of Edinburgh, Scotland

Coordinates: 55°55′57.85″N 3°15′36.91″W

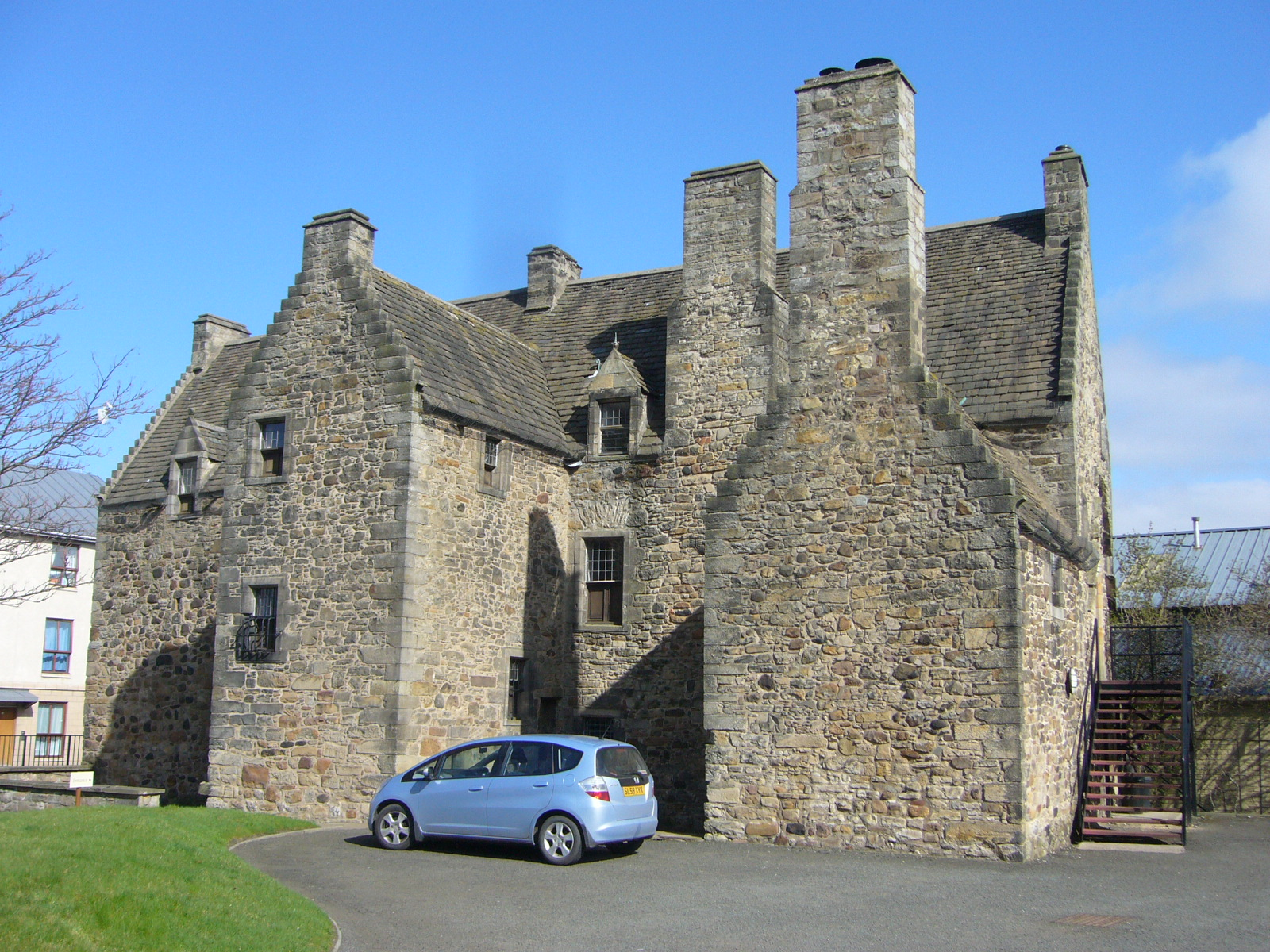
Stenhouse Mansion

An aerial view of Ford's Road, a typical Stenhouse street

Stenhouse is a suburb of Edinburgh, the capital of Scotland. It lies to the west of the City Centre, adjacent to Whitson and Saughton Mains and close to Broomhouse and Chesser. It is a mainly residential area.

The area derives its name from the Stanhope or Stenhope family who held land and mills near the Water of Leith from 1511 to 1621. Early references are variously to Stennop Milne (1576), Stanehope mylnes (1578), Stanehopps (1585), Stenhopmilne (1630) until, in 1773, the name Stenhouse Mill appears.

The oldest building, now known as Stenhouse Mansion, lies to the south of the area. The house was probably originally built by the Stenhopes but it was substantially rebuilt and extended by Patrick Ellis, an Edinburgh burgess and merchant, in 1623 according to the datestone over the main entrance with his initials and the Ellis heraldry, as described by George Mackenzie. It was restored in 1964 and used as a centre for conservation of paintings and carved stones for Historic Scotland until 2009 and now is maintained by the National Trust for Scotland.

Around five hundred houses were built at Stenhouse between 1930 and 1936 by the City Architect Ebenezer MacRae, mainly two-storey flatted blocks but with three-storey tenements to the north-west. The area was provided with shops at Stenhouse Cross (originally a crossroad but now a roundabout) and a school, Stenhouse Primary. on Saughton Mains Street.

From November 1953, 287 (4th Edinburgh) Squadron, of the Air Training Corps, was based at its drill hall in the extreme north-west of Stenhouse, next to the Edinburgh/Glasgow railway line. In 2008, the Squadron was forced to move to make way for the Edinburgh Trams line but it relocated to new premises on Stevenson Drive, adjacent to Saughton Enclosure, in 2010. In recognition of its connection with Stenhouse, the Squadron was renamed 287 (Stenhouse) Squadron in 2012.

Another part of Edinburgh – a hamlet east of Liberton now referred to as Ellen's Glen – was once also known as Stenhouse probably after an ancient stone-built house in the area.

== Transport ==
Lothian Buses services 1,2,22 and night bus N22 pass through the area while services 3,25,30,33,35,300 and night services N25 and N30 travel along Stenhouse Road on the southern edge. The nearest trams stops are Saughton and Balgreen.

== Notable residents ==
- William Stevenson (1772–1829), Scottish nonconformist preacher and writer

== Sources ==
- (Google Maps)
- Aerial views of Stenhouse Housing Estate in 1935
