= HM Prison Low Moss =

Government agency in East Dunbartonshire, Scotland

HMP Low Moss
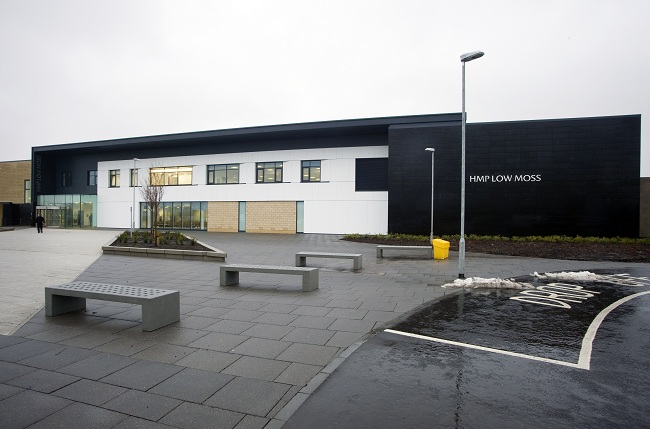

- Location in Scotland
- Location: Bishopbriggs, East Dunbartonshire; 55.906°N 4.220°W
- Status: In Service
- Capacity: 784 (884 revised safe operating capacity)
- Opened: 1968 (Redeveloped 2012)
- Managed by: Scottish Prison Service
- Governor: Karen Norrie

HMP Low Moss is located on the outskirts of Bishopbriggs, East Dunbartonshire; near Glasgow, Scotland. It has been operated by the Scottish Prison Service as a prison since 1968 and was for low-category prisoners who had sentences of less than 36 months to serve. The original establishment was closed in May 2007, with the entire site being cleared and redeveloped with a considerably enlarged footprint. The new prison was reopened in March 2012, and accepted its first intake in almost five years. Scott Watson is the Establishment's acting Governor.

== History ==
=== RAF Bishopbriggs ===
Originally a Second World War-era Royal Air Force (RAF) Barrage balloon depot, known as RAF Bishopbriggs, constructed in 1939, base of No.18 (Balloon) Squadron and No. 15 Maintenance Unit. It was also used as an overnight 'transit' camp for other RAF Units being transferred from the south of England to the north of Scotland. After WW2, RAF Bishopbriggs was utilised as a training school for the Royal Military Police for a time.

==== RAF 388 Mobile Radar Bomb Scoring Signals Unit ====
In the 1960s the Officers Mess building on the other side of the Lenzie road, next to St Mungo's playing fields, was later used for the Combined Messing (Officers, SNCOs and other ranks) and Unit HQ base for 388 Signals Unit (RAF), also known as 388MRBSSU or the Glasgow bomb plot. It used two AA No. 3 Mk.7 radars to score simulated bombing missions on pre-determined target ranges in the Glasgow area. The radars were installed on one of the concrete former Barrage Balloon pans, situated near the Civil defence practice house and were enclosed by a fence and locked gates. The unit closed in mid 1966 and the radars moved to RAF Ouston in Northumberland.

USAF and RAF bombers utilised the range, types included the Douglas B-66 Destroyer, Convair B-58 Hustler, the V bombers and English Electric Canberras.

=== Scottish Prison Service use ===
Low Moss was first used by the Scottish Prison Service as a training school between 1964 and 1970. There was a break in this use between 1966 and 1968 when training reverted to Barlinnie Prison.

=== Conversion to Prison ===
In September 1968, the former RAF camp was initially converted into a temporary, low security male prison. The planning permission restricted the sentence length and category of prisoner, and it set an eventual closure date of the temporary prison for December 1974. An extension of time until 1986 was sought in December 1981, to allow closure of Low Moss once Shotts Prison had been refurbished. Strathkelvin District Council agreed to that extension in January 1982.

A further year was requested in February 1988, but in July the council objected to that request and sought a public local inquiry, after which the council approved a limited 3-year period, as opposed to the originally proposed 5 years, in June 1989. In June 1992 the council received a further renewal request, and in November it agreed to the continued use of the site as a prison until November 2002. Another 10 year renewal request was lodged in June 2002, and because the council objected in August 2002, the request was referred to the Scottish Executive for a decision, with a further 10-year extension granted in June 2003.

=== Accommodation ===
The prison was of wooden, single-storey construction, and the accommodation comprised 11 Nissen hut dormitory-style units linked by internal corridors and Davidson House, a temporary, pre-fabricated building. The corridors linking the dormitories were narrow and did not permit good access. Some investment took place, with the partial refurbishment of seven dormitories in the mid-1980s. The accommodation was communal and offered little privacy. It housed approximately 300 prisoners at any one time.

== Closure and reconstruction ==
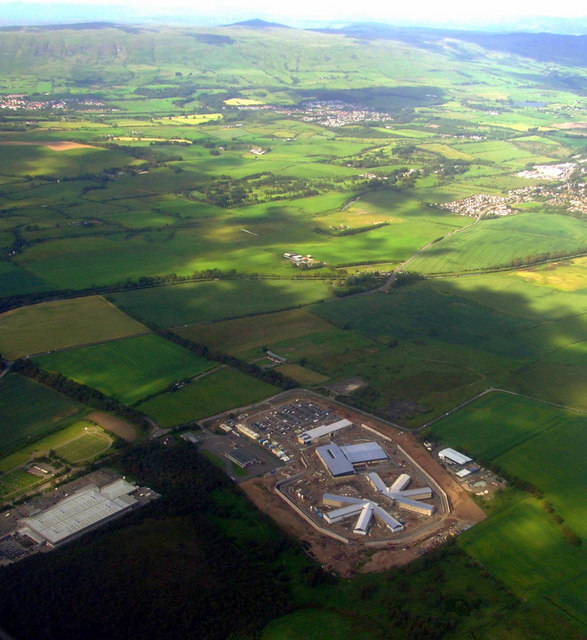
Aerial view of HMP Low Moss during reconstruction (2011)

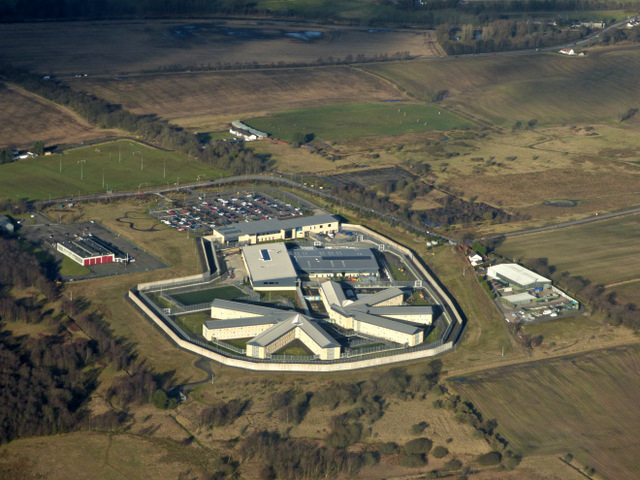
Aerial view of HMP Low Moss (2018)

In early January 2007, it was announced that the Scottish Executive had overruled the initial objection by East Dunbartonshire Council for the prison to be totally rebuilt to modern standards under a private finance initiative. However a review by the New Scottish Government later that year called for the original plans to be re-evaluated. As a result, the prison is the first new build publicly operated prison to be opened in Scotland for almost 30 years.

The subsequent tendering process, resulted in Carillion being selected as contractor for the new publicly funded prison in May 2009. The replacement prison on completion was to be three times the size of the old prison, capable of accommodating 700 inmates with 300 staff in a medium-security facility. Construction on the new prison began in February 2010 for completion in early 2012.

Whilst the old prison was operated for low-category prisoners serving sentences of less than 36 months the SPS said that the new HMP Low Moss, in common with all new prisons, was built to take the highest category of prisoner as standard. The prison opened its doors in March 2012 and prisoners were phased in over a 10-week period. Though the SPS had been recruiting over the months leading up to the opening, the majority of the staff were to be experienced officers transferring from existing prisons.

== Other uses ==
Part of the former RAF Bishopbriggs site has also been used as a Large goods vehicle and MOT testing centre from the late 1960s, and a Golf Driving range, which was constructed on the northeastern part of the former base. A Department of Health and Social Security Homeless Resettlement Unit, known as "the Spike" also used part of the former RAF Bishopbriggs site until its closure in March 1996.
