= HM Prison Kilmarnock =

Prison in East Ayrshire, Scotland

Coordinates: 55.58327°N 4.43213°W

HMP Kilmarnock
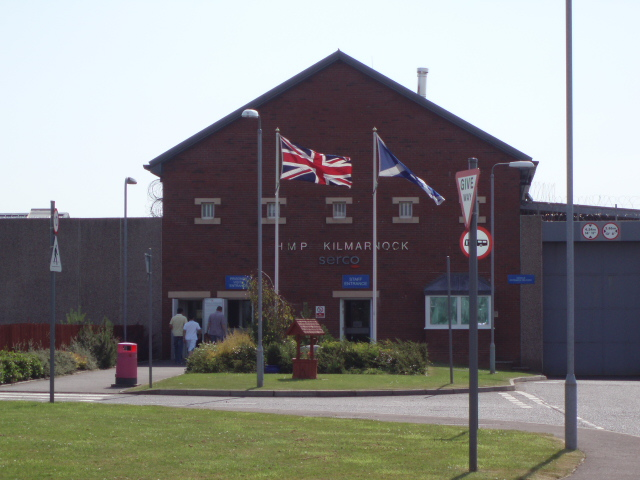
- Interactive map of HMP Kilmarnock
- Location: Kilmarnock, East Ayrshire
- Status: Operational
- Capacity: 500
- Population: 493 (October 2021)
- Opened: 1999
- Managed by: Scottish Prison Service
- Governor: Craig Thomson

HM Prison Kilmarnock is a prison in Bowhouse, Hurlford near Kilmarnock, East Ayrshire, Scotland. It is situated 3 miles (5 km) south-east of Hurlford on the Mauchline Road. Its location means it is locally known as Bowhouse Prison.

The prison was opened 25 March 1999 by Premier Prison Services and was privately run by Serco (who acquired Premier in 2002) until the expiry of their contract in March 2024 at which point the Scottish Prison Service took over direct management of the prison.

In 2005 the BBC program Panorama uncovered several failings in the operational running of the prison, resulting in the prison carrying out internal investigations.

The prison has a design capacity of 500 places and holds short-term, long-term and remand male adults.

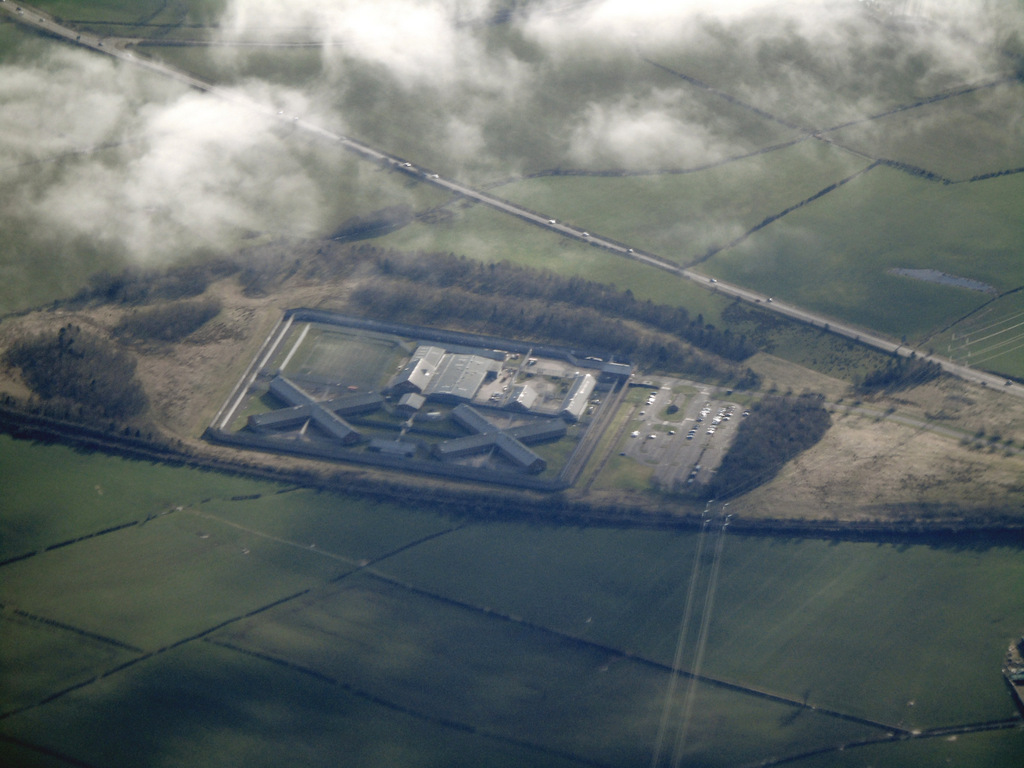
Aerial view of HMP Kilmarnock in 2022
