= Scottish Prison Service =

Executive agency

Agency overview
- Formed: 1993
- Type: Executive agency of the Scottish Government
- Jurisdiction: Scotland
- Headquarters: One Lochside 1 Lochside Avenue Edinburgh EH12 9DJ
- Employees: 4,900
- Minister responsible: Neil Gray MSP, Cabinet Secretary for Justice
- Agency executives: Teresa Medhurst, chief executive; Linda Pollock, deputy chief executive
- Website: www.sps.gov.uk

Map
- Scotland in the UK and Europe

The Scottish Prison Service (SPS) (Scottish Gaelic: Seirbheis Phrìosain na h-Alba) is an executive agency of the Scottish Government tasked with managing prisons and Young Offender Institutions.

The chief executive of the Scottish Prison Service, currently Teresa Medhurst, is responsible for its administration and reports to the Cabinet Secretary for Justice, who is responsible for the Scottish Prison Service within the Scottish Government.

There are fifteen prison establishments in the country, one of which is privately managed. The SPS employs over 4,000 staff, with its headquarters in One Lochside, located in South Gyle, Edinburgh.

== Key personnel ==
Teresa Medhurst is chief executive of the SPS. She is responsible to Scottish Ministers for the management, performance and future development of SPS. Responsibility for all operational matters is delegated to the chief executive by the director general (Education and Justice).

She is supported by Deputy Chief Executive Linda Pollock.

SPS operates a four directorate model. Each directorate is headed by an executive director who are members of both the SPS Advisory Board and the SPS Executive Management Group.

Directors

- Ian Whitehead and Andy Hodge – directors of operations
- Sarah Angus – director of policy
- Adam Jobson – director of organisational development
- Gerry O'Donnell – director of finance

== List of establishments ==
- HMP Addiewell (privately managed by Sodexo Justice Services under contract to the SPS.)
- HMP Barlinnie
- The Bella Centre
- HMP Castle Huntly (open prison)
- HMP Dumfries
- HMP Edinburgh
- HMP Glenochil
- HMP & YOI Grampian (Young Offenders Institution)
- HMP Greenock
- HMP Inverness
- HMP Kilmarnock
- The Lilias Centre
- HMP Low Moss
- HMP Perth
- HMYOI Polmont (Young Offenders Institution)
- HMP Shotts
- HMP Stirling

=== Future prisons ===
- HM Prison Glasgow
- HM Prison Highland

== Other responsibilities ==
=== Prisoner escorting ===
Prior to April 2004, the SPS was directly responsible for escorting convicted prisoners in Scotland, including those appealing their conviction or sentence. The duties of escorting prisoners on remand and managing court custody facilities were the responsibility of the relevant local police force.

In November 2003, the SPS signed a contract on behalf of the Scottish Ministers for a "Prisoner Escort and Court Custody Service". This contract with Reliance Secure Task Management Ltd provided for all prisoner escorting between police cells, court, prisons and hospitals as well as covering escorts from prison such as funerals, hospital appointments and community placements and also operating the court custody units.

In 2012, the court custody and prisoner escort service contract was taken over by G4S. GEOAmey currently run the service, having taken over from G4S in January 2019. The current contract is due to expire in January 2027, subject to an optional extension for a period of up to 4 years.

=== Secure hospital ===
Some prisoners are detained in a secure psychiatric hospital. This is run by the Scottish National Health Service rather than the SPS.

- State Hospital, Carstairs, South Lanarkshire

== Prison aftercare ==
An aftercare scheme, Throughcare, has significantly cut reoffending. The scheme involves getting released prisoners a roof over their heads, sorting out their benefits and medical needs, and showing them that someone cares about them. 78% of former prisoners who received Throughcare did not return to prison over two years. Eleven Scottish prison service sites use Throughcare. "The TSOs [Throughcare Support Officers] use a case management approach, working collaboratively with the prisoner, their family, statutory and third sector service partners, to discuss appropriate support provision and to develop a personalised plan to support the person during their transition from custody back in to the community."

== Media coverage ==
The SPS has been featured in many TV shows including Prison: First & Last 24 Hours on Sky One which was broadcast between 28 October 2015 and 5 December 2016.

== See also ==
- His Majesty's Chief Inspector of Prisons for Scotland
- His Majesty's Prison Service
- List of United Kingdom prisons
- Northern Ireland Prison Service
- Prison categories in the United Kingdom
- Scottish Courts and Tribunals Service
- United Kingdom prison population
- Young offender
