= HM Prison Edinburgh =

Prison in Edinburgh, Scotland

Coordinates: 55.9268°N 3.2611°W

HMP Edinburgh
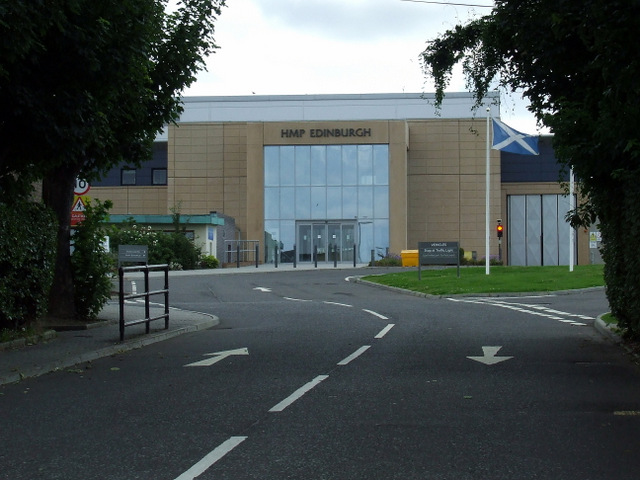
- Interactive map of HMP Edinburgh
- Location: Stenhouse, Edinburgh
- Status: Operational
- Capacity: 872
- Population: 923
- Opened: 1920
- Managed by: Scottish Prison Service
- Governor: Scott Watson
- Website: sps.gov.uk/prisons/edinburgh

HMP Edinburgh is a prison in Scotland. It is located in the west of Edinburgh on the main A71, in an area now known as Stenhouse, and, although never named as such, has commonly been known as Saughton Prison from the old name for the general area. The prison is situated on the edge of a predominantly residential area and has good transport and road links to the city centre, which provides good access both for local courts and prison visitors. The building of the prison began on 31 July 1914 with the first prisoner being received in 1919. The prison consists of four halls: Glenesk, Hermiston, Ingliston and Ratho.

The prison receives inmates from the courts in Edinburgh, the Lothians and the Borders. The prison manages adult male individuals including those on remand, short term sentences (serving less than four years), long term sentences (serving four years or more), life sentence prisoners and extended sentence prisoners (Order for Lifelong Restriction).

== Healthcare ==
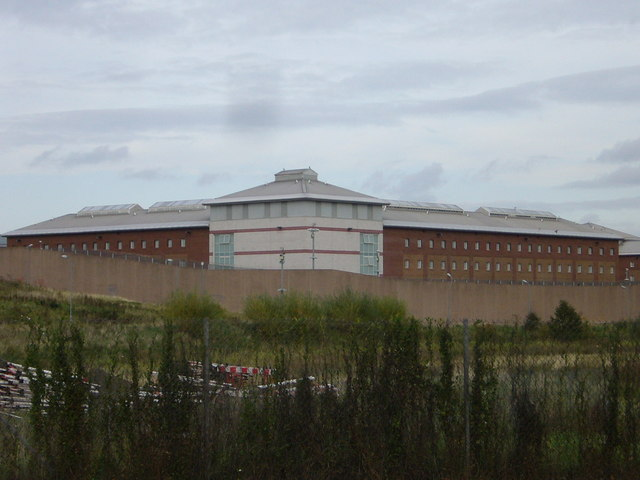
H.M. Prison, Saughton

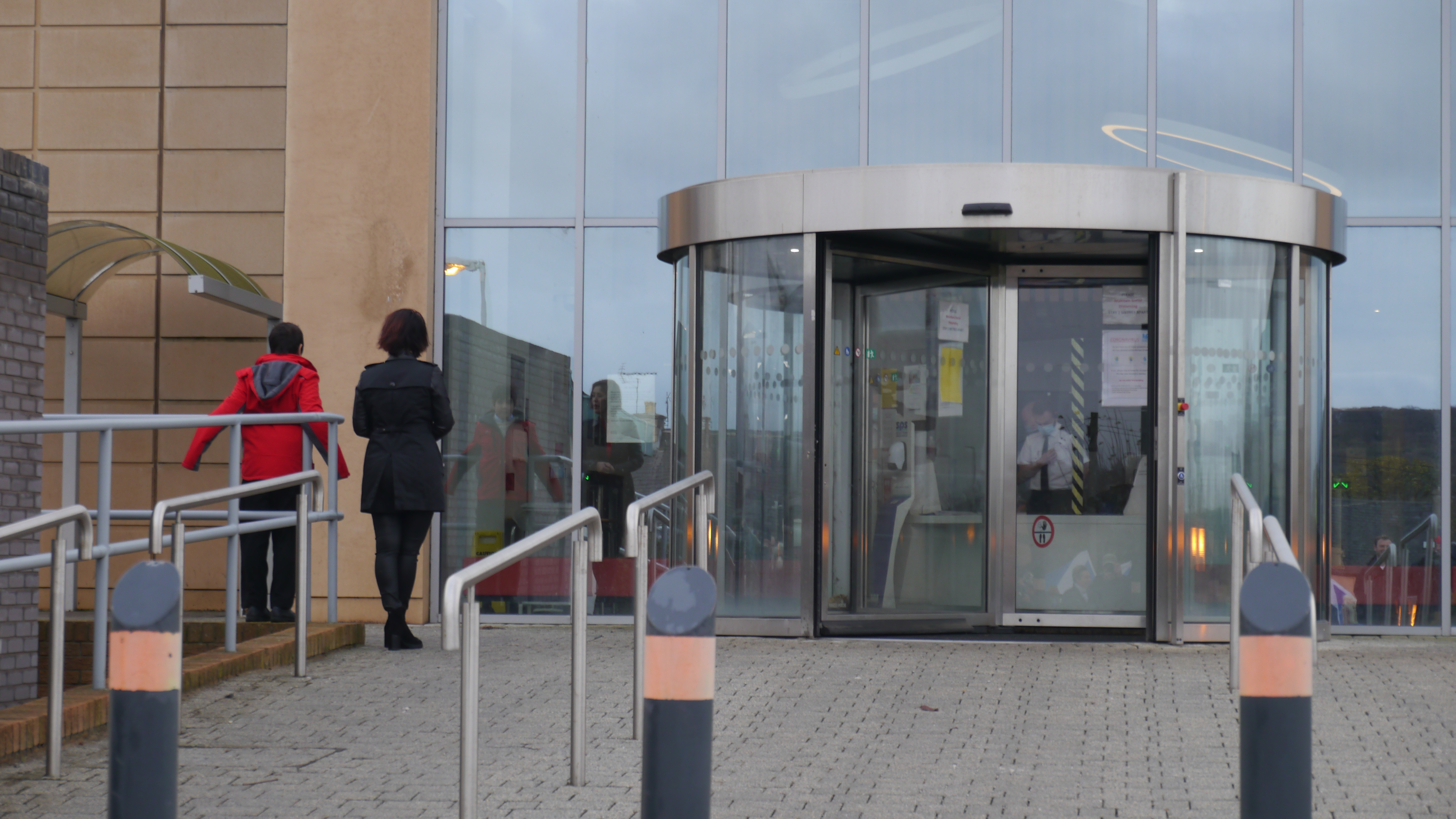
Craig Murray's wife and son wait outside the entrance of the Saughton Prison at the day of his release

As of 1 November 2011, healthcare is provided by the NHS. Prior to this it was provided through prison service employed nursing staff, with a GP and on call service provided by the healthcare staff provider (Medacs).

== Library ==
The prison library was the winner of the 2010 UK Libraries Change Lives Award for its work in promoting literacy among its incarcerated population, who typically have much lower literacy rates on admission than the general population. Kate King, the librarian, was also named UK public library staff member of the year in 2014.

== Notable inmates ==
- Robert Bayne – Sentenced to life imprisonment for the murder of Zoe Nelson.
- Isla Bryson – believed to be the first transgender woman to be convicted of rape for offences she committed prior to transition.
- Dominic Devine – Convicted of rape and attempted murder. Transferred to HM Prison Shotts after being caught smuggling drugs.
- Stephen Gough – A naked rambler repeatedly imprisoned for public nudity.
- Craig Murray – Journalist convicted of contempt of court.
- Eduardo Paolozzi – Scottish sculptor and artist was held here for three months during World War II because of his Italian heritage.
- Kenny Richey – Served 21 years on death row in Ohio, and spent 6 months at HMP Edinburgh before being found not guilty of Serious Assault to permanent disfigurement and was released on 8 March 2009.
- Nicholas Alahverdian – American sex offender and fugitive, who claims mistaken identity. Extradited back to the USA in January 2024.
- Vincent Reynouard – French holocaust denier and Nazi sympathiser.
- Peter Murrell - Former SNP chief Executive moved to HMP Dumfries sentenced to 5 years and 3 months in prison he will serve this sentence in HMP Dumfries
- Peter Tobin – Sentenced to life imprisonment with a whole life order for the murders of Angelika Kluk, Vicky Hamilton and Dinah McNicol. Tobin died in October 2022.
