= HM Prison Shotts =

Prison near Shotts, North Lanarkshire, Scotland

His Majesty’s Prison Shotts
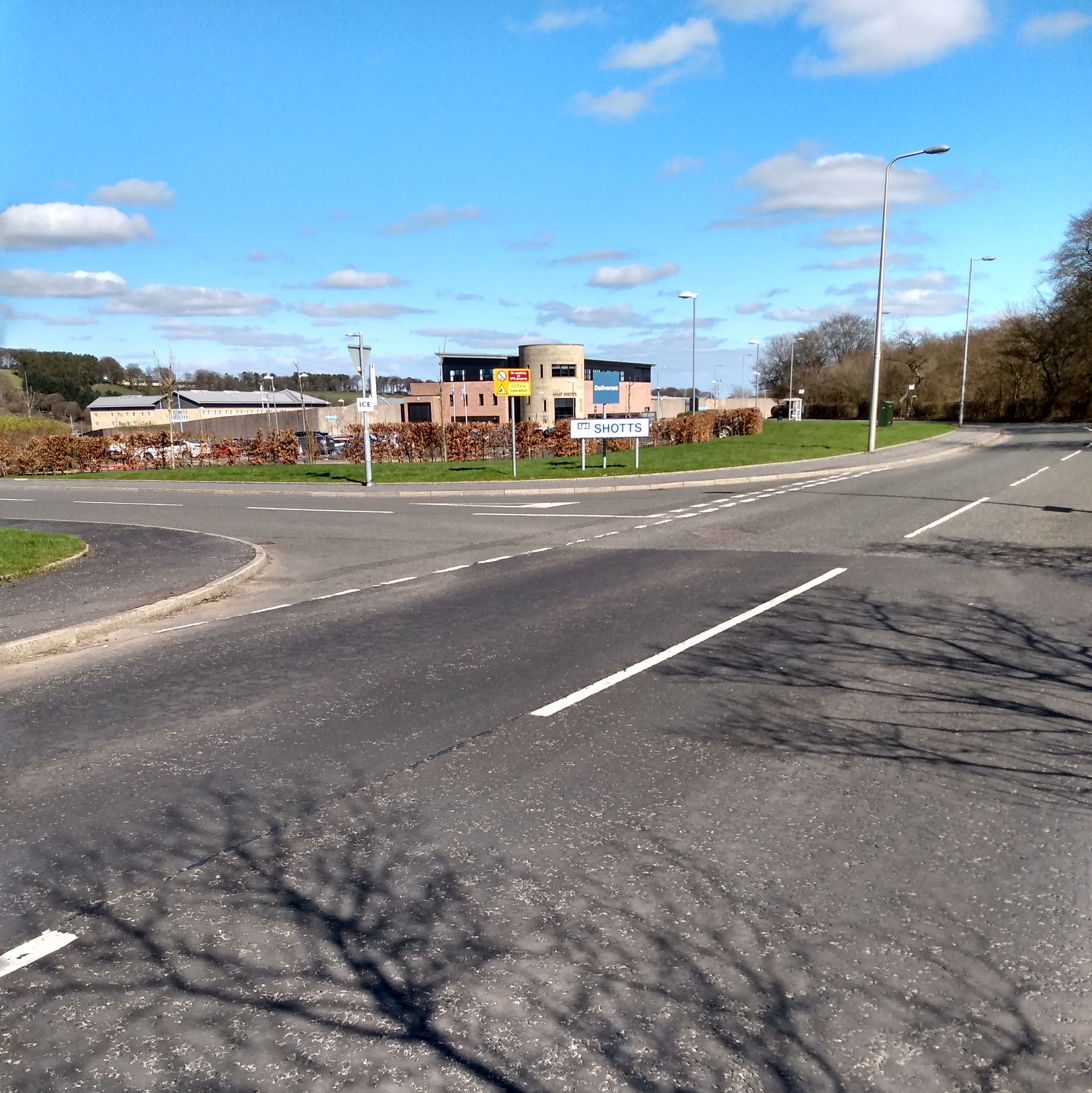
- Entrance to HMP Shotts in 2021
- Interactive map of His Majesty’s Prison Shotts
- Location: Shotts, Scotland; 55°49′43″N 3°49′32″W
- Status: Operational
- Capacity: 550
- Population: 2.5(February 2007)
- Opened: 1978
- Managed by: Scottish Prison Service
- Governor: Gillian Walker

HM Prison Shotts is a prison near Shotts, North Lanarkshire, Scotland. It is a prison holding male prisoners with maximum security classification. Shotts exclusively holds prisoners serving a term of five years or longer, with some prisoners being transferred from other prisons due to a need for a more secure environment. The original prison was opened in 1978 with a design capacity of 528 inmates; the prison was completely rebuilt and new facilities opened in 2012, with a capacity of 538 adult male prisoners.

== National facilities ==
Shotts is the location for two national facilities, which provide specialist environments for a range of offenders around Scotland, including those outside the standard "catchment area" for the prison.

=== National Induction Centre ===
The National Integration Centre (NIC) is a national facility providing for prisoners at the start of sentences of at least eight to ten years. The function of the centre is to provide an environment which can prepare the inmates for eventual moves to mainstream prisons. The NIC excludes prisoners serving sentences for sex offences. The centre was created to provide for prisoners in the first three to six months of their sentence, but some stay for up to two years with the average stay being approximately one year. In February 2007 the centre held 116 inmates.

=== Kerr House ===
Kerr House is a 'top-end facility' located at HMP Shotts. It became the national top-end facility for Scotland in March 2007. It provides accommodation for low-supervision prisoners nearing the end of medium to long sentences (at least four years), most of whom have progressed from the mainstream facility at Shotts. The facility provides room for up to 59 inmates and in February 2007 held 46.

== Accommodation ==
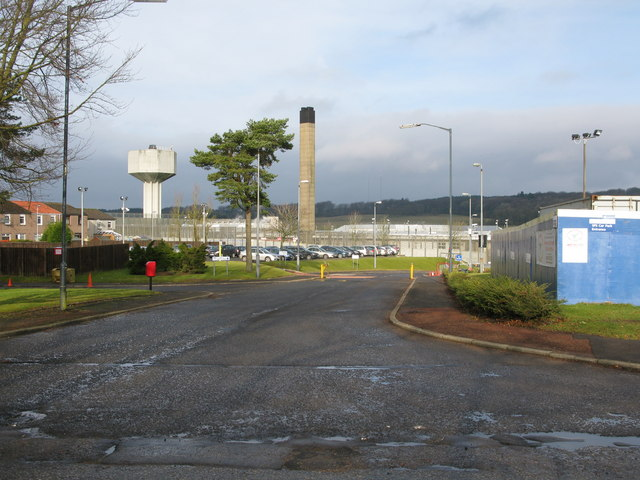
Old prison site in 2011, before demolition

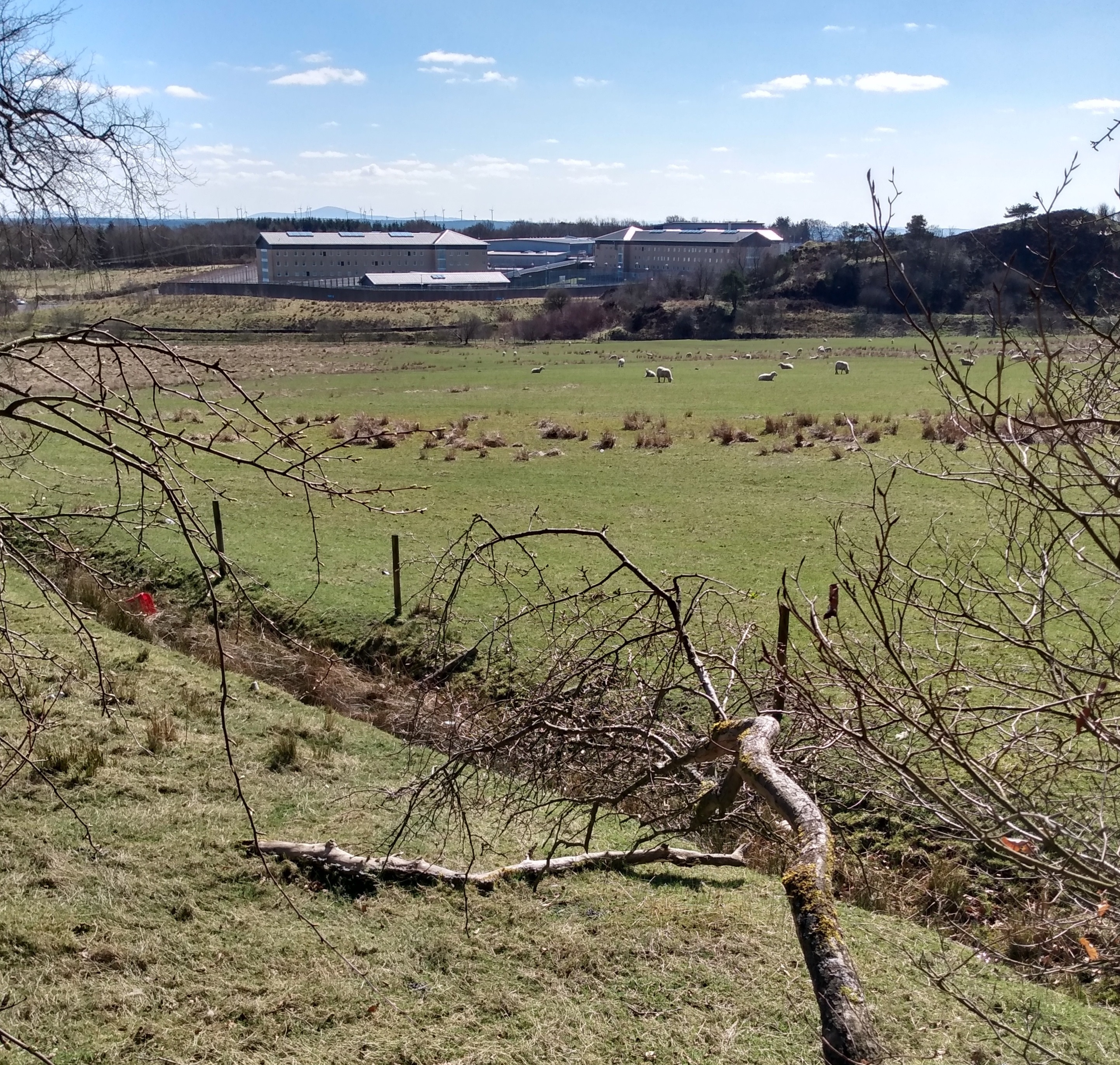
New prison site in 2021

HMP Shotts contains 6 accommodation units, including a Segregation Unit and the two National Facilities. 'B' and 'C' halls are the mainstream halls holding prisoners from the National Induction Centre or other nearby prisons. 'D' hall is a non-sex offender protection unit which houses inmates who have asked to be removed from mainstream circulation for their own protection. The NIC, 'B', 'C' and 'D' halls are almost identical in design, providing accommodation for approximately 120 prisoners. The Segregation Unit houses up to 12 inmates, from Shotts and other prisons around Scotland, who have been removed from general prison populations.

When inspected by HM Inspectorate of Prisons in February 2007, Shotts held a total of 512 prisoners. During an inspection in February 2007, the units held the following number of prisoners:

Hall	Prisoner Count
'B' Hall	114
'C' Hall	116
'D' Hall	112
Segregation Unit	8

Shotts prison was completely rebuilt in 2012, with a capacity of 553 adult male prisoners.

When HMP Shotts was rebuilt they removed the 'B' 'C' and 'D' halls along with Kerr House. As of 2023 HMP Shotts contains 'Allanton Hall' holding roughly 275 prisoners, which has four floors, floor one and two contains protection prisoners, while three holds mainstream and four is the National Induction Center (NIC). There is also 'Lamont Hall' which holds roughly 275prisoners and all four of its floors hold mainstream prisoners. The 'Segregation & Reintegration Unit' or SRU holds 12 prisoners who are kept in the SRU for many reasons such as: to be removed from the mainstream, for their own protection and for others protection.
