= HM Prison Greenock =

Prison in Inverclyde, Scotland

Coordinates: 55.9424°N 4.78214°W

His Majesty’s Prison, Greenock
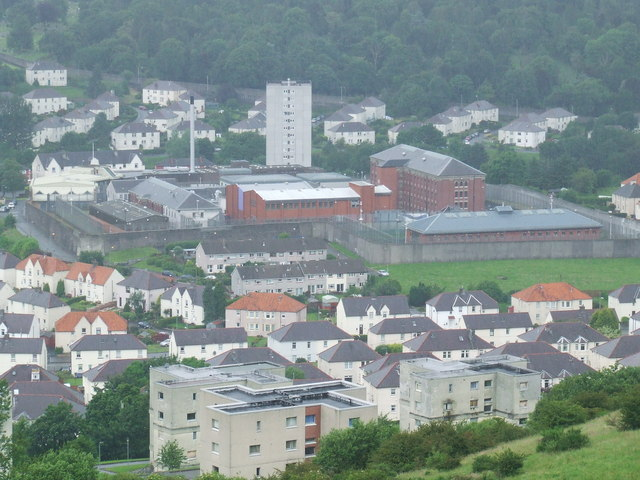
- Interactive map of His Majesty’s Prison, Greenock
- Location: Greenock, Inverclyde
- Status: Operational
- Opened: 1910; 116 years ago
- Managed by: Scottish Prison Service
- Governor: George Ferguson

HMP Greenock is a prison located in Greenock, Scotland, serving designated courts in western Scotland by holding male prisoners on remand, and short-term convicted prisoners. It also provides a national facility for selected prisoners serving 12 years or over, affording them the opportunity for progression towards release. It also accommodates a small number of female prisoners ranging from remand to long-term. Although officially labelled as HMP Greenock, it continues to be known by its original name Gateside Prison.

== Residential areas ==
HMP Greenock is divided into five separate residential areas.

=== Arran and Bute ===
Work began to build Arran and Bute halls in August 2013, with work completed in July 2014. These Halls are a new type of facility called Community Integration Units (CIU) They will hold 8 and 6 prisoners respectively, who will use their time there as a stepping stone in to the community.

=== Ailsa Hall ===
Ailsa Hall is the Prison's largest hall with a design capacity of 131, although this is usually exceeded. It holds remand prisoners, short term prisoners (STPs) and a small selection of long term prisoners (LTPs). This hall is all single-cell accommodation with electric power in cells and integral sanitation facilities.

=== Darroch Hall ===
Darroch Hall accommodates female offenders. This hall is all single accommodation with electric power in cells and integral sanitation facilities. Darroch Hall is designed to accommodate 56 prisoners.

=== Chrisswell House ===
The role of Chrisswell House is to prepare LTPs for progression to open conditions at HMP Castle Huntly. It has electric power in cells with shared sanitation facilities. Chrisswell House is designed to hold 64 prisoners.

== Notable prisoners ==
- Edward Cairney – Murderer of Margaret Fleming, who in 2016 was discovered to have disappeared while under Cairney and his partner's care in 1999 or 2000. This was the subject of the 2019 BBC documentary Murder Trial: The Disappearance of Margaret Fleming
- Abdelbaset al-Megrahi - Found guilty of 270 counts of murder in 2001 in connection with the 1988 Lockerbie bombing, which remains the worst act of terrorism to take place on British soil. Released in August 2009 on compassionate grounds due to his terminal prostate cancer prognosis, he died in Libya in May 2012.
