= HM Prison Grampian =

High-security correctional facility in Peterhead, Scotland

HMP YOI Grampian
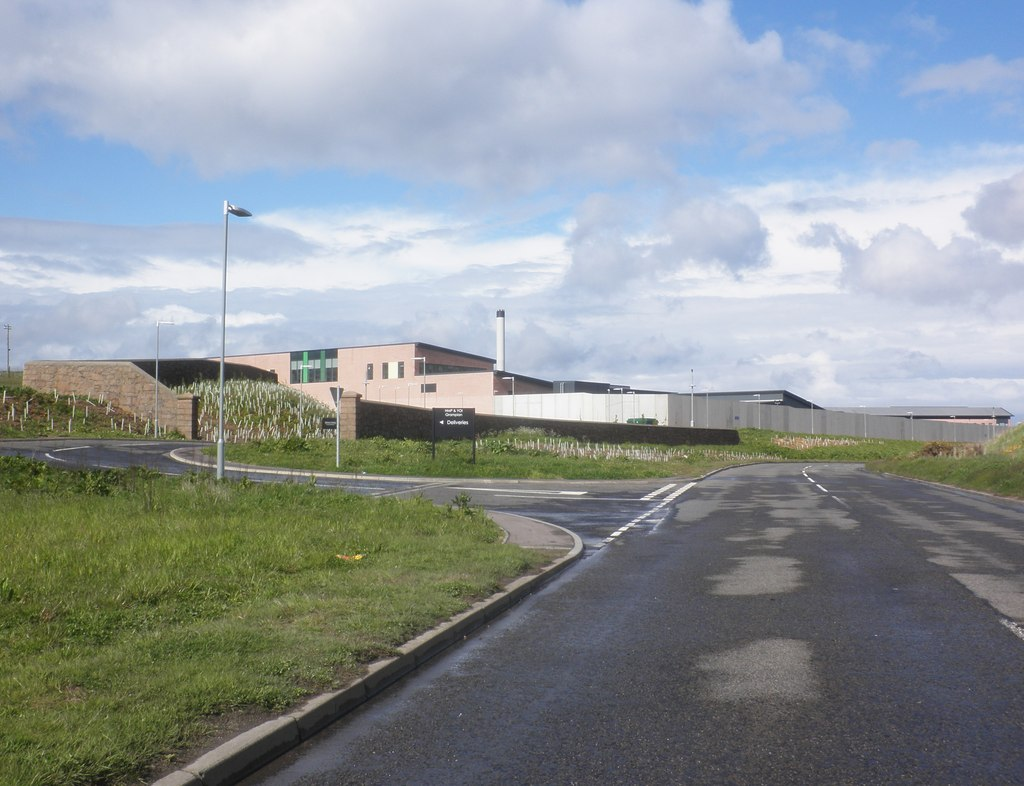
- Interactive map of HMP YOI Grampian
- Location: Peterhead, Scotland; 57.4897°N 1.7911°W
- Status: In Service
- Security class: Maximum Security
- Capacity: 560
- Opened: March 2014
- Managed by: Scottish Prison Service
- Governor: Martin Milne

HMP & YOI Grampian is a high security prison in Peterhead, Scotland. It is the only such facility in the northeast of the country, having replaced the former HMPs in Aberdeen and Peterhead in 2014. It is the newest jail in Scotland and amongst the newest in the United Kingdom. It has a design capacity of around 560 inmates.

The establishment has five residential housing blocks. Ellon Hall houses male offenders; Banff Hall houses female offenders. Cruden Hall is currently out of use, previously housing male young offenders. Aberlour unit houses prisoners who have community access. Finally, Dyce Hall is the Separation & Re-Integration Unit.

== History ==
Initially, the institution was planned to hold male prisoners, female prisoners and young offenders; however, two months after opening a riot led to damage of accommodation and the young offenders were transferred to HMYOI Polmont. Grampian did not return to holding male young offenders, due to the change in Scottish Government sentencing policy, and the reduction in young offenders at HMYOI Polmont.

== Senior management ==
=== Current ===
- Martin Milne — Governor
- Stuart Campbell — Deputy governor
- Eilidh Smith — Head of Offender Outcomes

=== Governors ===
There have been five governors since 2014.

1. James Farish, 2014–2015
2. Allister Purdie, 2015–2019
3. Michael Hebden, 2019–2023
4. Brian McKirdy, 2023–2025
5. Martin Milne - 2025–present

=== Deputy Governors ===
1. Mike Hebden (2014–2020)
2. Unknown (2020–2024)
3. Stuart Campbell (2024–present)
