= Plumstead =

Area in southeast London

Coordinates: 51.49°N 0.09°E

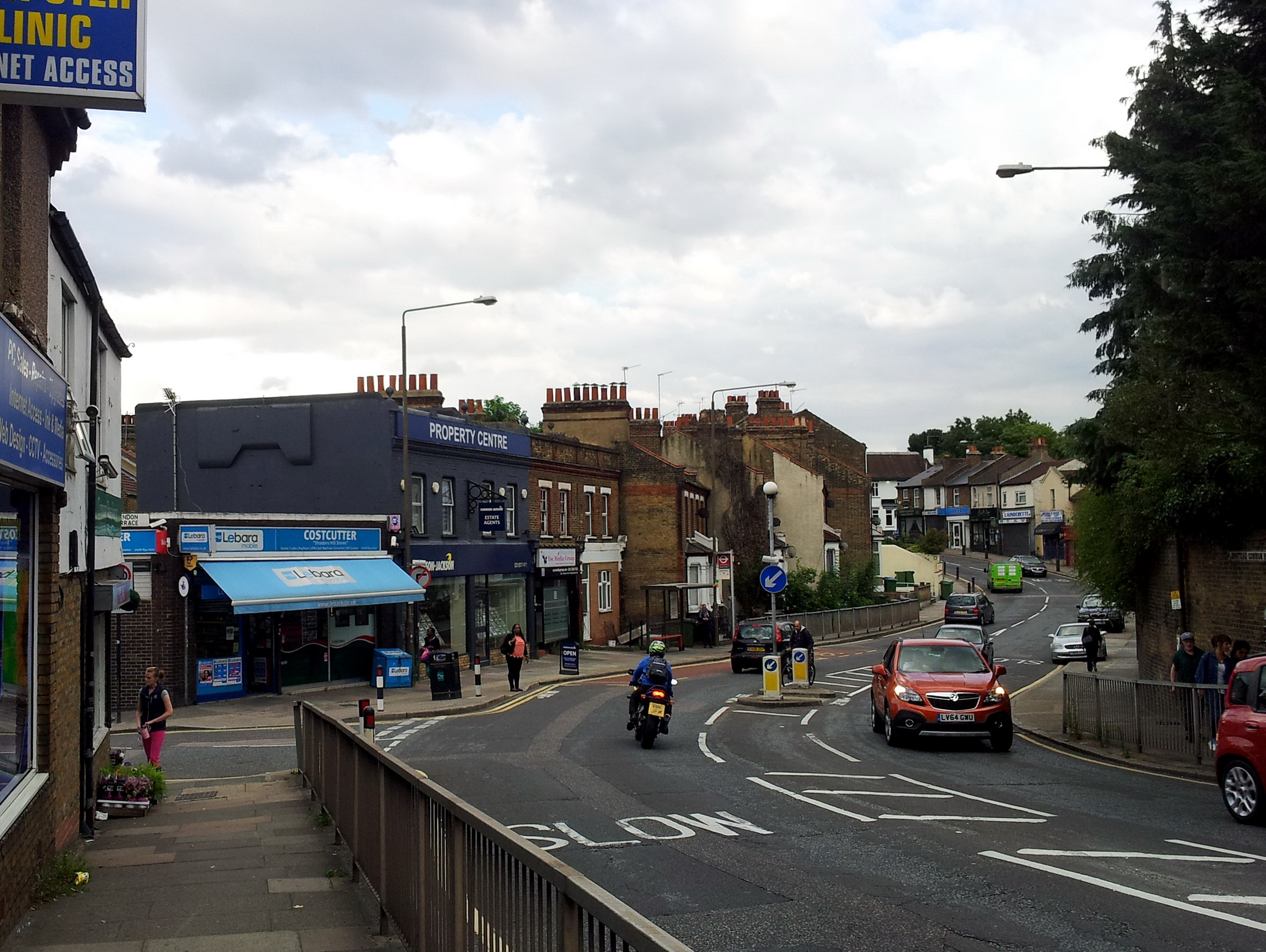
- Plumstead Common Road in 2015

- Location within Greater London
- Population: 16,736 (2011 Census Ward)
- OS grid reference: TQ445785
- London borough: Greenwich
- Ceremonial county: Greater London
- Region: London
- Country: England
- Sovereign state: United Kingdom
- Post town: LONDON
- Postcode district: SE18
- Postcode district: SE2
- Dialling code: 020
- Police: Metropolitan
- Fire: London
- Ambulance: London
- UK Parliament: Greenwich and Woolwich; Erith and Thamesmead Eltham and Chislehurst
- London Assembly: Greenwich and Lewisham

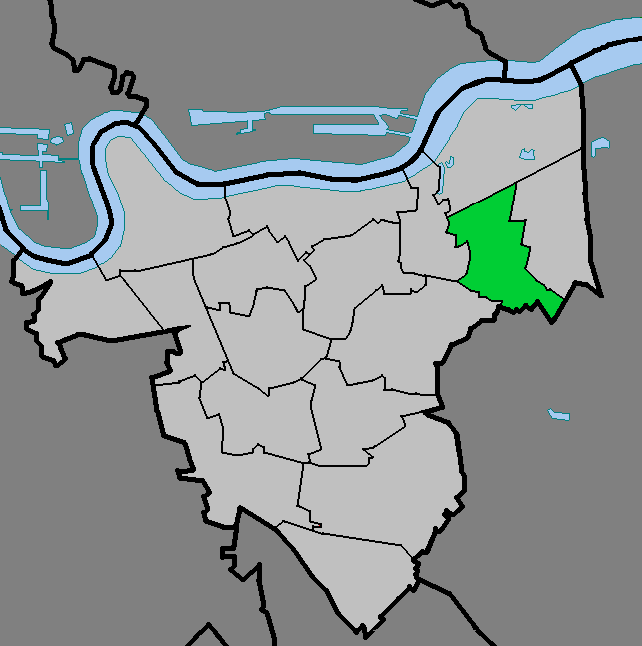
Plumstead ward (green) within the Royal Borough of Greenwich (light grey)

Plumstead is an area in south-east London, within the Royal Borough of Greenwich, England. It is located east of Woolwich.

== History ==
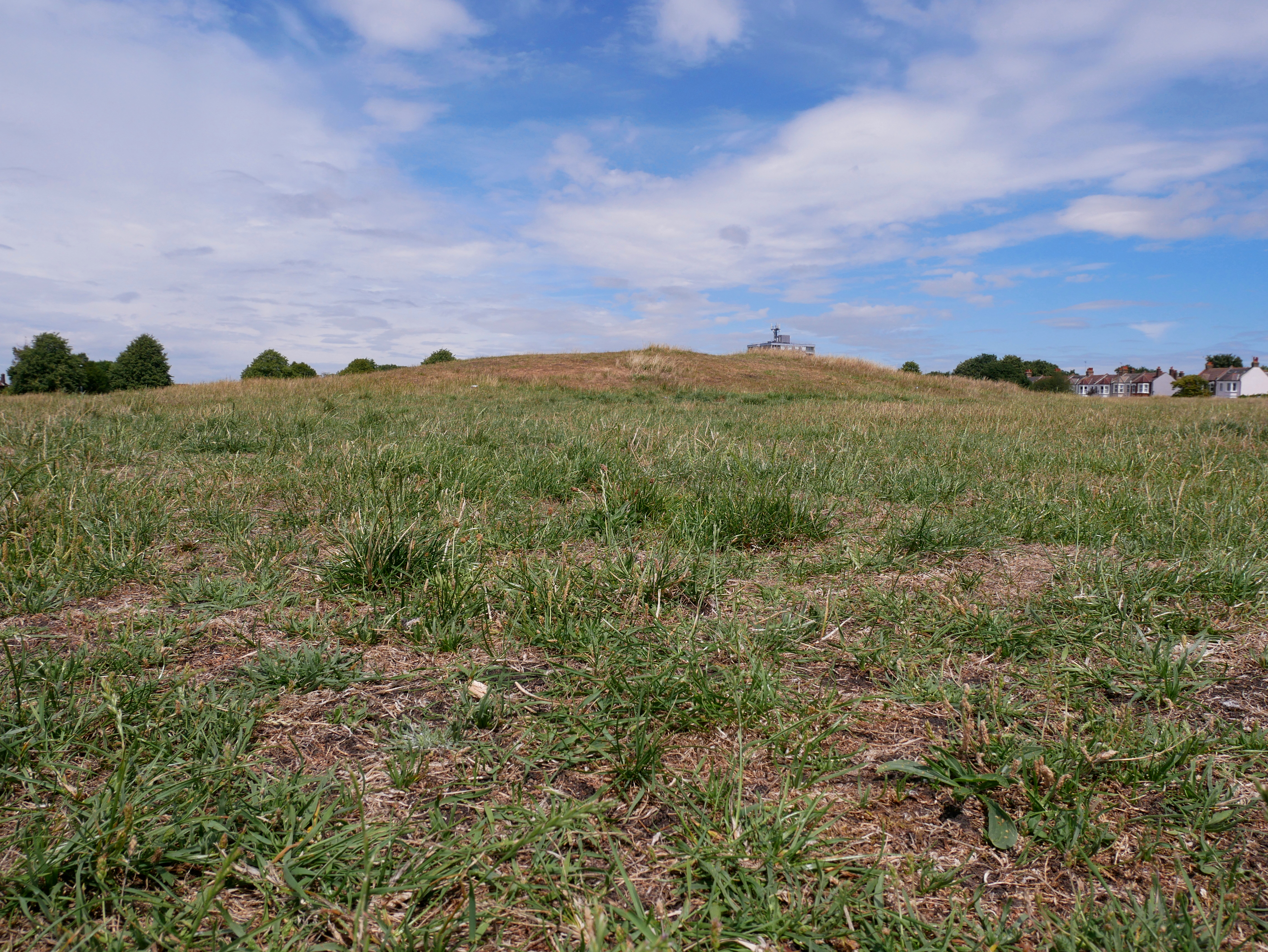
The prehistoric tumulus on Winn's Common in Plumstead

Plumstead has been settled since ancient times, and London's earliest timber structure has been found here. During the excavation of a peat bog near Belmarsh Prison in 2009, an ancient timber trackway, radiocarbon dated to be nearly 6,000 years old, was discovered by archaeologists.

In 960 King Edgar gave four plough lands, collectively called Plumstead, to a monastery - St Augustine's Abbey near Canterbury, Kent. These were subsequently taken from the monastery by Earl Godwin for his fourth son, Tostig.

King Edward the Confessor restored them again to the monastery on taking power, however Tostig saw the opportunity to take possession of them once again after Edward's death in 1066 when King Harold seized his brother's estates.

After the Battle of Hastings in 1066, William the Conqueror gifted Plumstead to his half-brother Odo, Bishop of Bayeux, whom he also titled Earl of Kent. The Archbishop of Canterbury Lanfranc of Pavia and the Norman abbot of St Austin's successfully interceded to reclaim a portion of the land on behalf of the monastery. In 1074 Odo then granted by deed the remainder of the parish and also the right of the abbot to be "Chief Lord of the Fee".

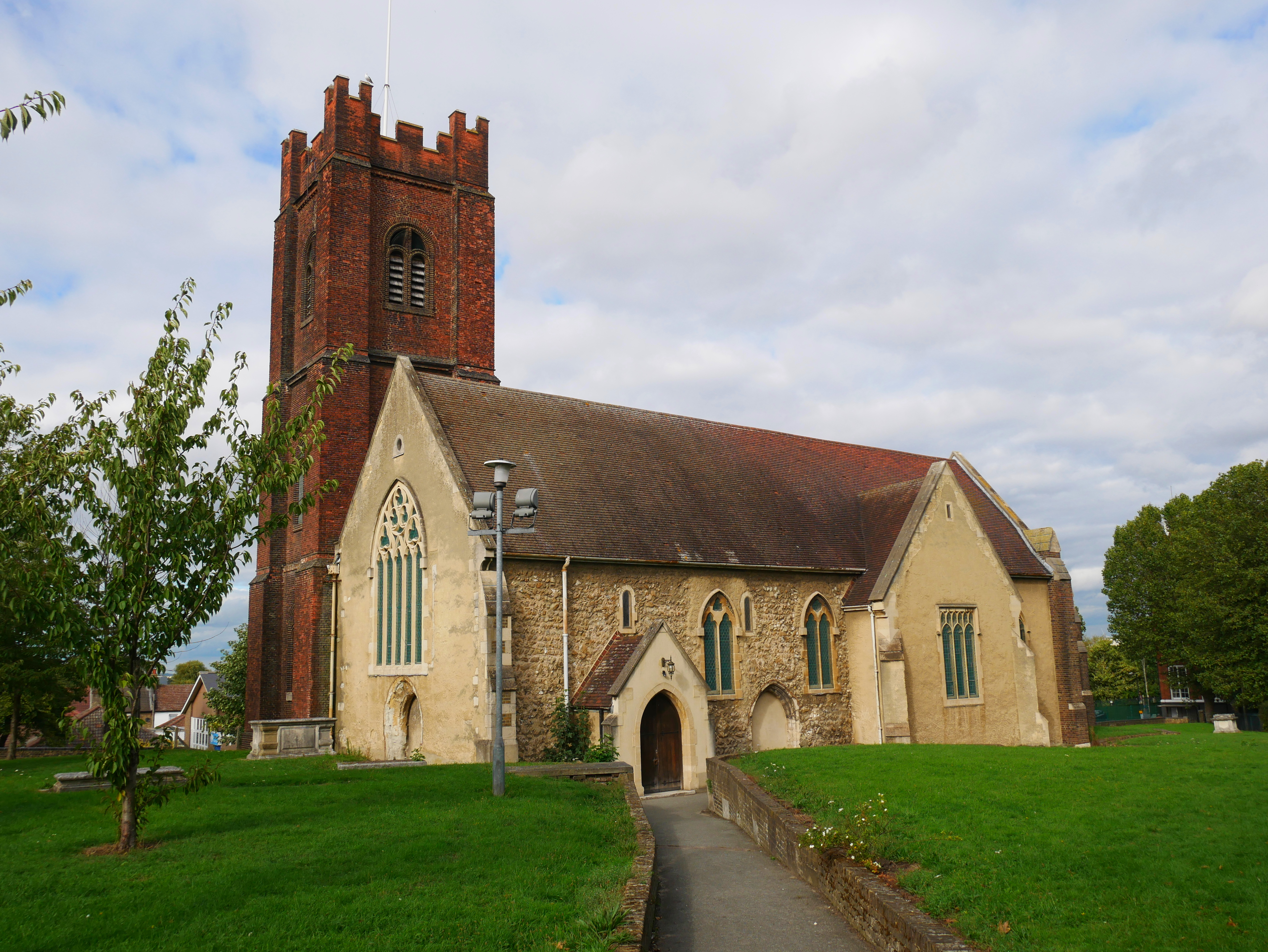
The medieval Church of Saint Nicholas in Plumstead

However, the Domesday Book of 1086 holds the details of Plumstead as two separate entries. Under the title of the land of the church of St. Augustine it reads

In Litelai hundred. The abbot of St. Augustine has 1 manor, named Plumstede, which was taxed at 2 sulings and 1 yoke. The arable lands is ... In demesne there is 1 carucate and 17 villeins, with 6 cottagers, having 6 carucates, there is wood for the pannage of 5 hogs. In the time of king Edward the Confessor, and afterwards it was worth 10 pounds, now 12 pounds, and yet it pays 14 pounds and 8 shillings and 3 pence.

while under the general title of the Bishop of Bayeux's lands

The abbot of St. Augustine holds of the bishop of Baieux, Plumsted. It was taxed at 2 sulings and 1 yoke. The arable land is 5 carucates. In demesne there is 1 carucate and 17 villeins, with 3 boarderers, having 4 carucates. There is wood for the pannage of 5 hogs. In the time of king Edward the Confessor it was worth 10 pounds, when he received it 8 pounds, and now as much, and yet he who holds it pays 12 pounds. Brixi Cilt held it of king Edward.

Around this time Reginald, son of Gervase de Cornhill, released to the abbot and convent all claims in this manor from David and Robert de Cornhill who had rented it from them.

By 1273 Nicholas de Spina was elected abbot of the monastery and by the following year he was receiving eleven pounds from Plumstead residents.

Lora de Ros, lady of Horton, gave her right to two carucates of land and 50 acres (200,000 m^{2}) of woods in Plumstead to the abbot, Thomas, in return for the rights of her and her heirs to partake of prayers performed in the church during 1287. It appears that Robert, the last abbot but one, had recovered a share of this land from her ancestor, Richard de Ros. It was found by a jury of grand assizes that his ancestors held this land in tenancy from the abbot and convent at a rent of twelve pound per annum.

In 1314, during the reign of Edward II, the abbot was summoned before Hervey de Stanton, the Chancellor of the Exchequer. He was asked to show by what right he claimed sundry liberties and free warren on the manor of Plumstead amongst others. Other questions included the right for a weekly market in Plumstead on a Wednesday and a fair yearly for three days "on the Eve day, and morrow of St. Nicholas".

For reasons that remain unclear, Edward III exempted the men and tenants of the manor of Plumstead from providing four men from the borough for the sheriff as was the requirement elsewhere. A writ to Roger de Reynham, Sheriff of Kent, in 1332 directed and commanded him that the residents of Plumstead should be allowed to send one man only. By 1363 Edward also decreed to the monastery in his charter of infpeximus that he released all manors and possessions given to it by former kings, including William the Conqueror. He also confirmed all the grants of liberties previously bestowed on the abbot and monastery.

By the time of Richard II of England the taxes from Plumstead were valued at 69 pounds, 10 shillings and sixpence, and Henry VI of England reconfirmed the liberties and rights of the monastery.

Plumstead manor, together with the church of Plumstead and the chapel of Wickham annexed to it, remained part of the possessions of the monastery until its final dissolution in 1539, the 30th year of the reign of Henry VIII, when the abbey and all its revenues were surrendered into the King's hands by the then abbot, John Essex, and its thirty members.

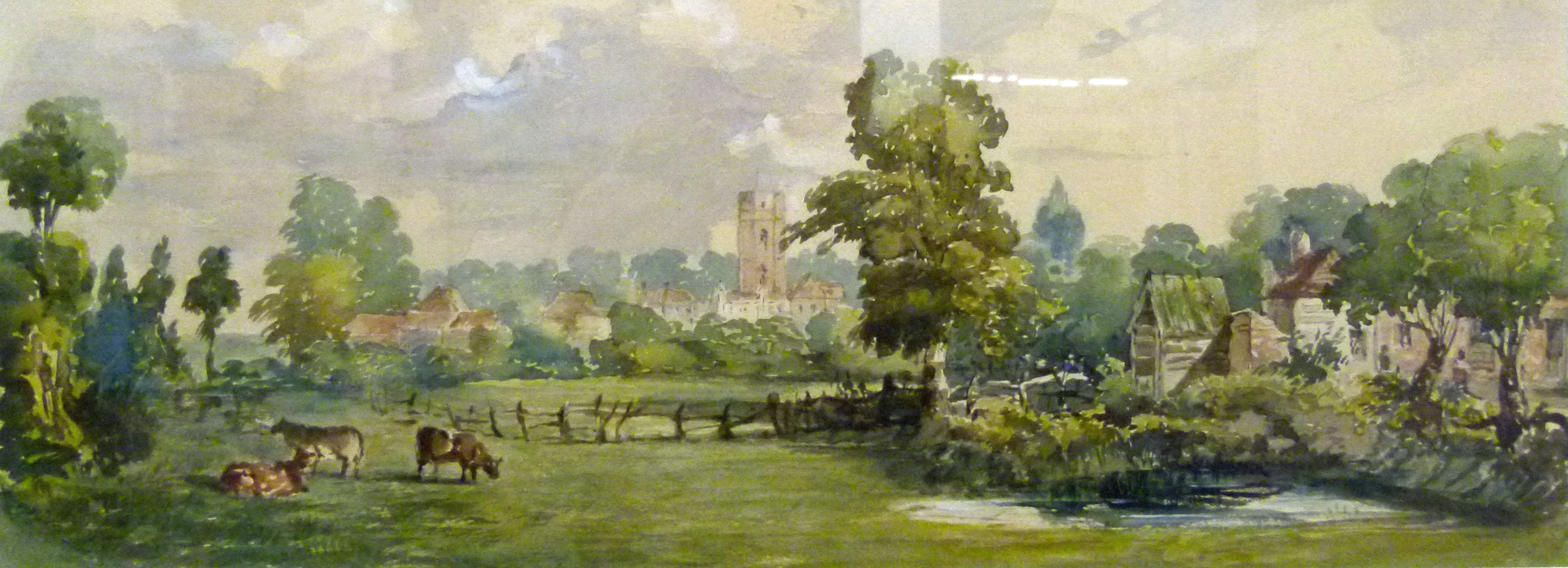
Plumstead around 1845

Plumstead expanded rapidly in the 1880s with housing developed for workers at the Royal Arsenal; two-up two-down terraced housing was common in the area close to the river and the Arsenal, whereas larger and smarter properties were developed uphill from the Thames, around Plumstead Common. The Plumstead Common Act 1878 (41 & 42 Vict. c. cxlv) protected Plumstead Common as public open space forever. In the late 19th century, Woolwich cemetery was developed in two phases (1856, 1855) on land formerly part of the southern edge of the Common.

Plumstead was also the home of the Peculiar People and an account of this Protestant sect is recorded in 'Unorthodox London' by the journalist Charles Maurice Davies. The Plymouth Brethren have had numerous meeting rooms in the area since about 1845. The present Brethren meeting places are at Plum Lane (1865), Willenhall Road (ca 1910) and Brewery Road (Richmond Gospel Hall). Quakers met nearby in Woolwich from 1905, and in their own Meeting House from 1924.

Plumstead had rapid housing growth but still retained large areas of green land i.e. Winns Common, Plumstead Common, Shrewsbury Park and Rockcliffe Gardens. The urban sprawl of lower Plumstead adjacent to Woolwich was not initially matched by upper Plumstead.

On 31 March 1930 the civil parish was abolished to form Borough of Woolwich. At the 1921 census (the last before the abolition of the parish), Plumstead had a population of 49,724.

== Education ==
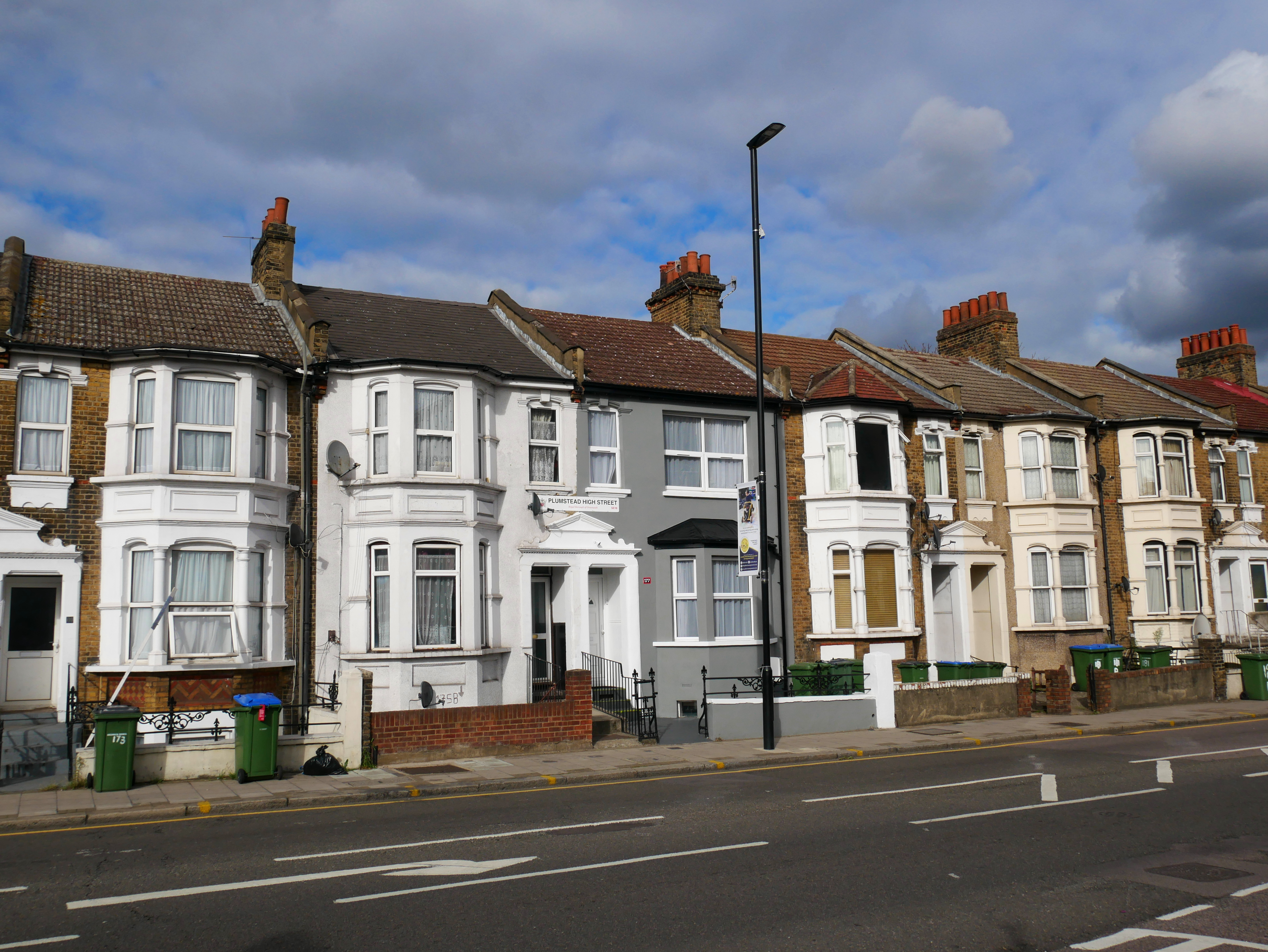
Terraced housing along the High Street at Plumstead

Plumstead Manor School is located in the area. The school was first established as Plumstead County School for Girls in 1913, and was later renamed Kings Warren Grammar School before becoming a comprehensive school in 1967. The school was a girls school until September 2018, after which it began accepting students of all genders.

There are a number of primary schools in Plumstead including St. Patricks RC Primary School, St. Margaret's CofE Primary School, Gallions Mount Primary School, Timbercroft Primary School, Bannockburn Primary School, Plumcroft Primary School, Greenslade Primary School, South Rise Primary School, and Conway Primary School.

== Sport ==
Arsenal Football Club (then known as Royal Arsenal or Woolwich Arsenal) played in Plumstead between 1886 and 1913, at various grounds in the Plumstead area, but mainly at the Manor Ground, on the north side of Plumstead Common Road and the Invicta Ground, where the Royal Ordnance Factories F.C. also played.

== Transport ==
=== Rail ===
Plumstead railway station serves the area with National Rail services to London Charing Cross via Lewisham, London Cannon Street via Greenwich, London Cannon Street via Bexleyheath, London Cannon Street via Sidcup, Kentish Town via Greenwich, Dartford and Rainham.

=== Buses ===
Plumstead is served by many bus routes provided by Transport for London. These connect Plumstead with other areas including Bexleyheath, Central London, Crystal Palace, Dartford, Eltham, Erith, Greenwich, Lewisham, New Cross, Orpington, Peckham, Sidcup, Thamesmead, Welling and Woolwich.

== Notable people ==
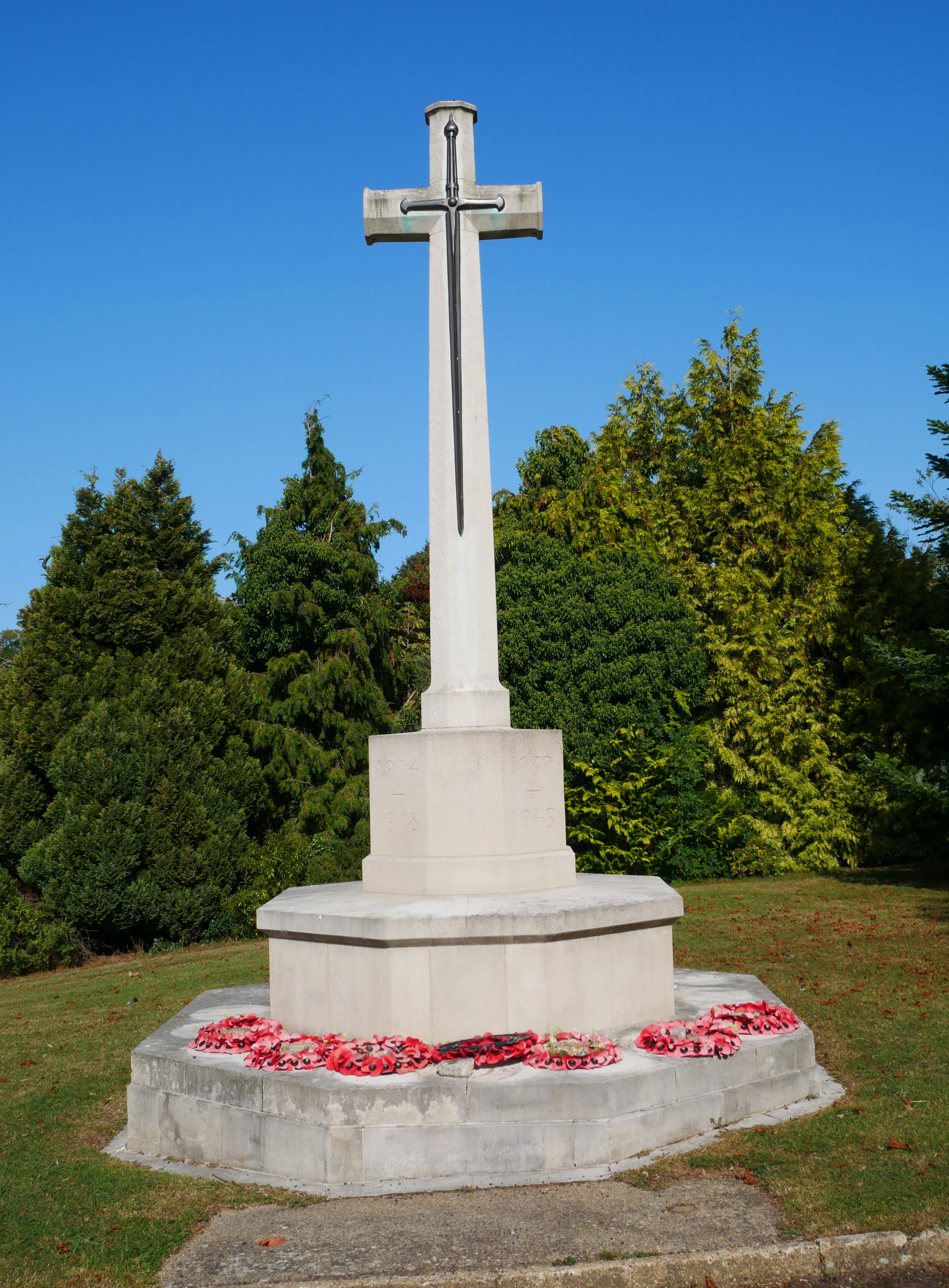
The twentieth-century war memorial in Plumstead Cemetery

Notable people from Plumstead include:

- Ethel Edith Bilsland, composer, soprano and pianist
- Michael Bradshaw, actor
- Charlie Buchan, footballer and writer
- Mason Burstow, footballer
- John Carnell, science fiction magazine editor
- Stephen Lawrence, victim of a racially motivated homicide
- George Chakravarthi, artist
- Ernest Clark, Governor of Tasmania.
- Charlie Collier, motorcycle racer
- Dave Courtney, gangland associate and author
- Steve Davis, snooker player
- Tanya Franks, actress
- Fred Hammill, trade unionist
- Kevin Horlock, footballer
- Marvin Humes, member of X-Factor finalist boy band, JLS
- Malvin Kamara, footballer
- Scott Maslen, television actor
- Taiwo Owatemi, MP for Coventry North West
- Lee Ryan, of boy band Blue
- Tinie Tempah, rapper
- Nina Toussaint-White, television actress
- Paul Walsh, footballer
- Bill Whitehouse, Formula 1 racing driver
- Shampoo, Pop duo
- Sir Charles Kuen Kao (1933 – 2018), an electrical engineer, lived on Wrottesley Road in Plumstead

Notable people buried in Plumstead Cemetery include:

- William Bennet (bishop), Bishop of Cloyne, Ireland, was buried in Plumstead in 1820, before the local cemeteries were established.
- Thomas Flawn VC (22 December 1857 - 19 January 1925)
- Edwin Hughes MP (27 May 1832 – 15 September 1904)
- Alfred Smith VC (1861 - 6 January 1932)

== Nearby areas ==
- Abbey Wood
- Belvedere
- Bexleyheath
- Blackheath
- Charlton
- East Wickham
- Greenwich
- Shooter's Hill
- Thamesmead
- Welling
- West Heath
- Woolwich

== Gallery ==
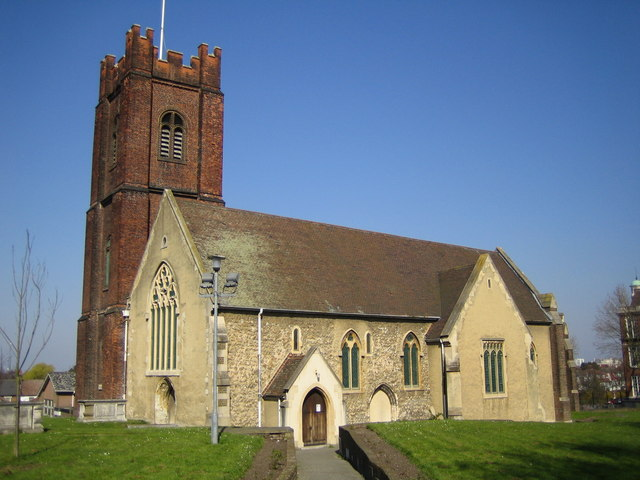
St. Nicholas' Church

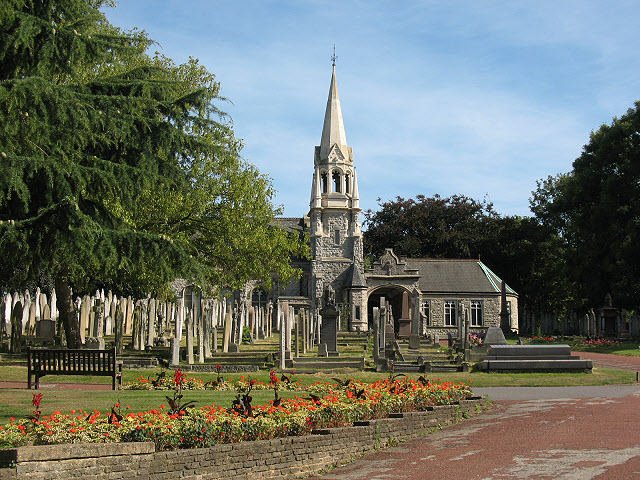
Cemetery

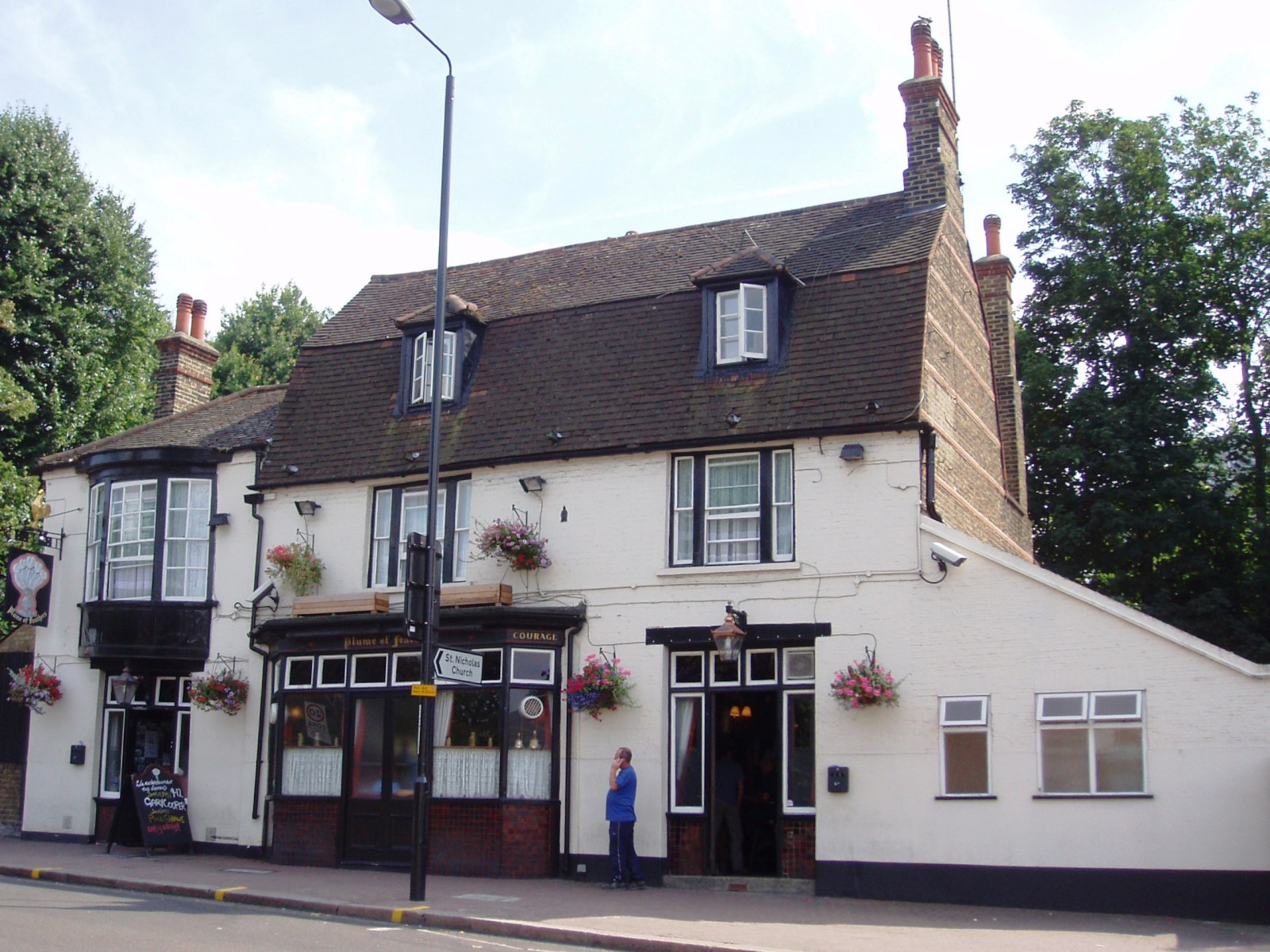
Traditional pub

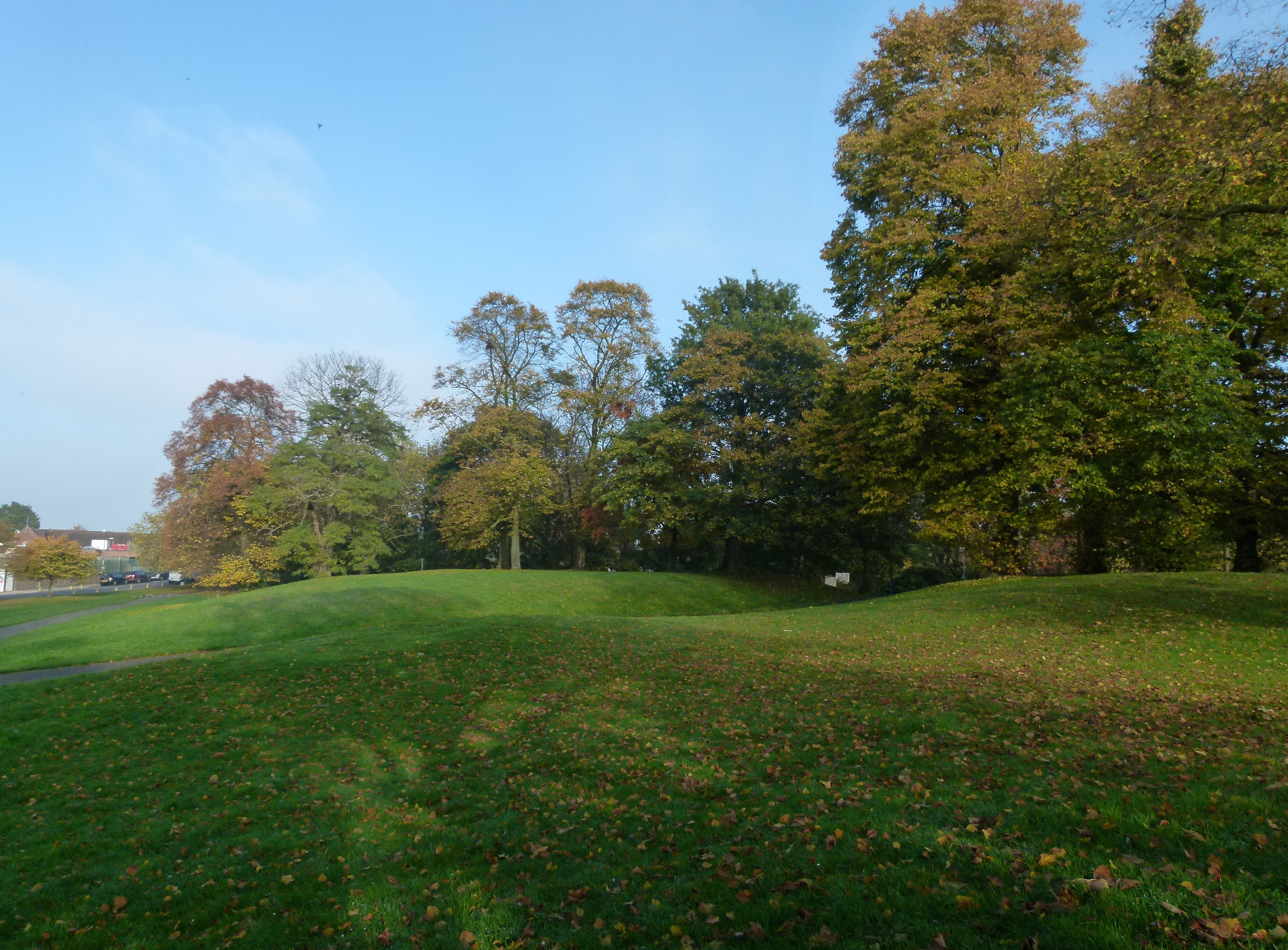
Plumstead Common
