= St Nicholas Church, Plumstead =

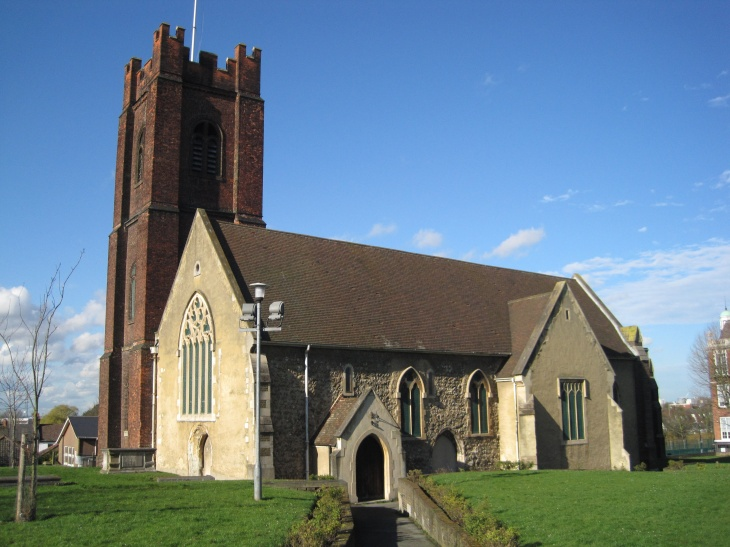
- St Nicholas Church, Plumstead
- 51°29′13″N 0°06′02″E
- OS grid reference: TQ 45931 78545
- Country: England
- Denomination: Church of England
- Website: saintnicholasplumstead.org

History
- Founded: c. 960

Administration
- Archdiocese: Canterbury
- Diocese: Southwark / Fulham
- Parish: St Nicholas

St Nicholas Church, Plumstead is an ancient parish church in Plumstead, Royal Borough of Greenwich, London.

The first church on the site dated to the 10th century, around the time of the first mention of Plumstead in written records c. 960. The earliest surviving part is the current south aisle (originally the nave), whose west wall was built in the 12th century and whose south wall is 13th century. The current nave is a former north aisle added in the 15th century. The tower dates to 1664.

Charles Henry Cooke (better known for designing over 200 lifeboat stations for the RNLI) restored the building in 1867–1868, and a north extension was added by Greenaway and Newberry in 1907–1908. It was badly damaged by doodlebugs in 1944–1945, and T.F. Ford & Partners repaired it in 1959. In the meantime it was Grade II* listed on 26 March 1954.
