= Woolwich Polytechnic School for Girls =

Location
- 1 Birchdene Drive; Thamesmead, Greater London, SE28 8RF; England

Information
- Type: Free school
- Established: 2019
- Local authority: Greenwich
- Department for Education URN: 143686 Tables
- Ofsted: Reports
- Head of school: Lizaan Williams
- Gender: Girls
- Age range: 11–16
- Enrolment: 472 (2021)
- Website: www.woolwichpolygirls.com

Woolwich Polytechnic School for Girls is a secondary school located in the Thamesmead area of the Royal Borough of Greenwich in London, England.

The school was established in September 2019, constructed on a playing field of Woolwich Polytechnic School for Boys. It is a free school for girls aged 11 to 16, however a sixth form provision is offered in conjunction with Woolwich Polytechnic School for Boys on the boys' school site.
