= Woolwich Polytechnic School for Boys =

Woolwich Polytechnic School For Boys

Location
- Hutchins Road; Thamesmead, Greater London, SE28 8AT; England; 51°30′13″N 0°06′30″E

Information
- Type: Academy
- Established: 1912
- Local authority: Greenwich
- Department for Education URN: 141163 Tables
- Ofsted: Reports
- Chair of Local Academy Committee: Holly Broughton
- Headteacher: Tom Lawrence
- Website: https://www.woolwichpoly.co.uk/

Woolwich Polytechnic School for Boys (founded 1912) is a secondary school for boys located in the Thamesmead area of the Royal Borough of Greenwich, London, England. The school is part of PolyMAT, a multi-academy trust.

== History ==
=== The founding of Woolwich Polytechnic ===
Woolwich Polytechnic School for Boys has its roots in the Polytechnic movement of the late 19th century. These polytechnics, of which Woolwich was the second, were set up with the aim of educating and 'improving' adult members of the working classes.

Quintin Hogg, a successful London sugar merchant and philanthropist, had been involved in the ragged school movement for many years, but in 1871 focused his efforts on forming an Evening Institute for those at work in the day. This was to approach the whole person, both by education, but also by moral example, giving access to meetings, opportunities for physical activities and enriching debates. There was a strong evangelical Christian input in these aims. Hogg's early aims were realised by the establishment of the London Polytechnic at Regent Street, which was set out to improve the whole person.

An early student at the Royal Polytechnic Institution at Regent Street was Francis (Frank) Didden. In 1884 Didden moved to Woolwich to take up a job as a fitter at the Royal Arsenal. He also had a burning ambition to set up a polytechnic in the Woolwich.

In 1884 Woolwich had a population of about 34,000 people, many of whom were employed as engineers at the Royal Arsenal, or the other large factories in the area. Despite its industries, Woolwich had many slums, drunkenness was widespread, and many jobs offered little or no real security. For many people a lack of education and dissolute habits prevented them from "getting on". Didden saw a polytechnic as a way forward, and in 1886 he asked Hogg for support (Hogg had founded a ragged school in Castle Street, Woolwich). Hogg's reply is illuminating.

“You certainly require, as a minimum, a gymnasium, a few class rooms, a reading room and a coffee bar, besides some small hall where meetings can be held.”

Didden campaigned passionately, raising some funding through a sports meeting held in July 1888 in Charlton Park, supported by the London Polytechnic, the Royal Arsenal and Royal Arsenal Co-operative Society. In 1890 T.A. Denny, a Woolwich bacon merchant, provided most of the £1,000 needed to buy a house in William Street (now Calderwood Street). Woolwich Polytechnic had its foundation. It grew rapidly. In 1891 it offered 38 courses to 504 students. In 1892 there were 80 courses offered to nearly 800 students. True to Hogg's model, Didden ensured that there was a strong sporting and social side to attract and reform the habits of members.

=== The school in Woolwich ===
Woolwich Polytechnic founded a number of day schools and junior technical schools with a history of beating the military spirit into children only to be sent to war, partly in response to the fact that much of its premises was left empty during the day as much of the teaching and activities took place in the evenings. In September 1897 a day school for boys was opened, Woolwich Polytechnic Boys Secondary School; Woolwich's first secondary school started with 72 boys. Woolwich Polytechnic Junior Technical School for Boys was established in MacBean Street in 1912 to train boys for jobs at engineering works. The school became the responsibility of London County Council in 1956, as Woolwich Polytechnic Boys School.

In 1974 the polytechnic was reorganised as a six-form entry comprehensive school spread over two sites. Years 1 and 2 (now 7 and 8) remained in MacBean Street, while the Upper School occupied the premises of the old Woolwich Central School in Sandy Hill Road.

=== History since 1997 ===
In 1997 the school was designated a Technology College. The school maintained a presence in Woolwich up to 1999 when the Upper and Lower Schools were combined in the former Waterfield School buildings in Thamesmead. The Upper school site was turned into a modern apartment complex; the Lower school was demolished and the site currently stands empty.

The school gained a good reputation for the quality of its pastoral care. Until the re-formation of its sixth form in 2011, it was (at 8 forms of entry) the largest all-boys 11–16 comprehensive in England. Exam results improved and the polytechnics was the most improved boys' school in England in 2010.

Woolwich Polytechnic was inspected by Ofsted in October 2011 and judged as 'outstanding'. The school got top marks in 21 out of 24 indicators on the report.

Previously a community school administered by Greenwich London Borough Council, Woolwich Polytechnic School converted to academy status on 1 August 2014. However the school continues to co-ordinate with Greenwich London Borough Council for admission.

From the 2012/13 academic year the school decided to elect a Head Boy, two Deputy Head Boys and a Head Girl. These are assisted by sixth form prefects, headed by a Senior Prefect.

== Notable former pupils ==
- David Bolarinwa, sprinter
- Terence Boston, Labour Party politician
- Jon Davison, professor of teacher education; former Dean of the Institute of Education, University of London
- Kevin Horlock, professional footballer with Manchester City, Swindon Town and Ipswich Town, and a Northern Ireland international
- Alan Knott, England cricketer (wicket-keeper)
- Rob Lee, a professional footballer with Charlton Athletic, Newcastle United and Derby County, and an England international
- Barrie Linklater (1931–2017) illustrator and painter
- Lee Murray, convicted bank robber; professional mixed martial artist
- Martyn Sekjer, England International bowler and team manager
- Paul Walsh, professional footballer with Charlton, Luton, Liverpool, Tottenham Hotspur, Manchester City and Portsmouth, and England international (was also Woolwich Poly football school captain)
- Delroy Lindo, British born actor, Hollywood and stage
- Abdullah Malik, teacher at Oxford University, former astrophysicist
- Kelvin Todd, Former English professional footballer
- Grady Diangana, Congolese professional footballer

== See also ==
- Woolwich Polytechnic School for Girls
