= Plumstead Manor School =

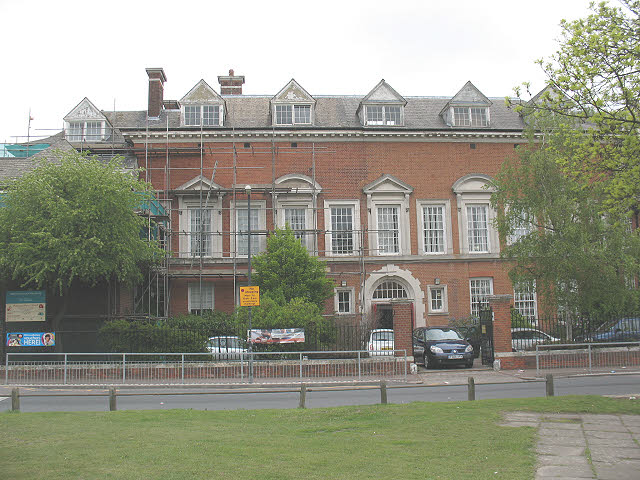

Location
- Old Mill Road; Plumstead, London, SE18 1QF; England
- 51.48201°N 0.08468°E

Information
- Type: Community school
- Established: 1913
- Local authority: Greenwich
- Department for Education URN: 100183 Tables
- Ofsted: Reports
- Head Teacher: Douglas Greig
- Gender: Coeducational
- Age: 11 to 19
- Enrolment: 1,486
- Website: www.plumsteadmanor.com

Plumstead Manor School is a coeducational secondary school and sixth form located next to Plumstead Common in the Plumstead area of the Royal Borough of Greenwich in London, England. It is a community school administered by Greenwich London Borough Council.

The school was founded as Plumstead County School for Girls in 1913. The school was later renamed Kings Warren Grammar School. The school became comprehensive in 1967, being renamed to Plumstead Manor School. The school was enlarged in the 1970s, and new additional buildings were opened at the school in 2013. Plumstead Manor School was a girls school until September 2018, when it started accepting both genders.

Plumstead Manor School offers GCSEs, BTECs and vocational courses as programmes of study for pupils. Students in the sixth form have the option of studying from a range of A Levels as well as further BTECs.
