= Thamesmead =

Coordinates: 51.504°N 0.1261°E

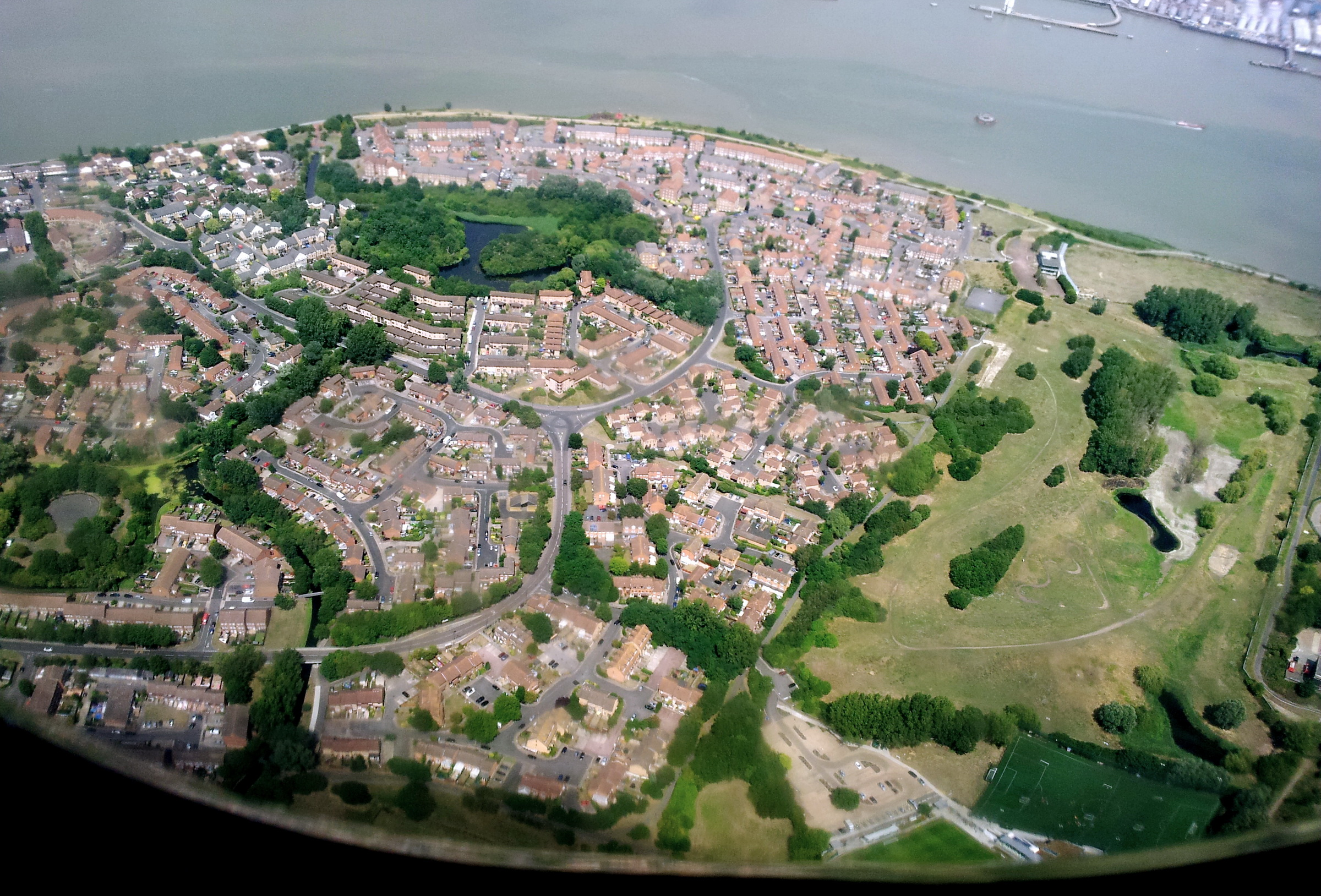
- Aerial view of Thamesmead in July 2015

- Location within Greater London
- Population: 31,824 (Thamesmead Moorings and Thamesmead East wards 2011)
- OS grid reference: TQ475805
  - Charing Cross: 10.6 mi (17.1 km) W
- London borough: Bexley; Greenwich
- Ceremonial county: Greater London
- Region: London
- Country: England
- Sovereign state: United Kingdom
- Post town: LONDON
- Postcode district: SE2, SE28
- Post town: ERITH
- Postcode district: DA18
- Dialling code: 020
- Police: Metropolitan
- Fire: London
- Ambulance: London
- UK Parliament: Erith and Thamesmead
- London Assembly: Bexley and Bromley; Greenwich and Lewisham

Thamesmead (/ˈtɛmzmiːd/) is an area of south-east London, England, straddling the border between the Royal Borough of Greenwich and the London Borough of Bexley. It is located 11 miles (18 km) east of Charing Cross, north-east of Woolwich and west of Belvedere. It mainly consists of social housing built from the mid-1960s onwards on former marshland on the south bank of the River Thames.

== History ==
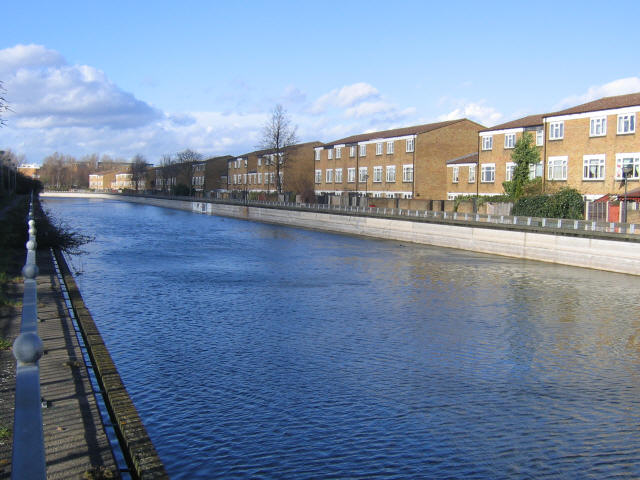
Pilkington Canal (also called Broadwater Canal) formerly connected to Woolwich Arsenal, and now remains as a water feature.

There is some evidence of prehistoric human occupation of the area: flints, animal bones and charcoal were found in bore holes around Western and Central Way in 1997 by the Museum of London Archaeological Service (MOLAS). In Roman times, the river level was significantly lower, and work by MOLAS in 1997 around Summerton Way revealed evidence of field ditches and pottery and quernstones from Germany dating from around the 3rd or 4th century. After the Roman era, river levels rose again and the area reverted to marshland. According to Hasted, some areas of this marshland were drained in 1279 by the monks of Lesnes Abbey.

Between 1812 and 1816, a canal was built by convicts to take materials such as timber from the River Thames to Woolwich Royal Arsenal. Much of this canal has been filled in, but part remains in Thamesmead West and is now called the Broadwater. A disused lock gate and swing bridge over the canal still exist beside the River Thames.

Most of the land area of Thamesmead previously formed about 1,000 acres (4.0 km^{2}) of the old Royal Arsenal site that extended over Plumstead Marshes and Erith Marshes.

=== Original concept ===
Thamesmead as it is now was built at the end of the 1960s. Efforts were made to solve the social problems that had already started to affect earlier estates. These were believed to be the result of people being uprooted from close-knit working-class communities and sent to estates many miles away, where they did not know anybody. The design of the new estates meant that people would feel more isolated than they would have done in the terraced housing that had been typical in working-class areas. The solution proposed was that once the initial residents had moved in, their families would be given priority for new housing when it became available.

Another radical idea of the GLC division architect Robert Rigg was taken from housing complexes in Sweden, where it was believed that lakes and canals reduced vandalism and other crime, mainly among the young. He used water as a calming influence on the residents.

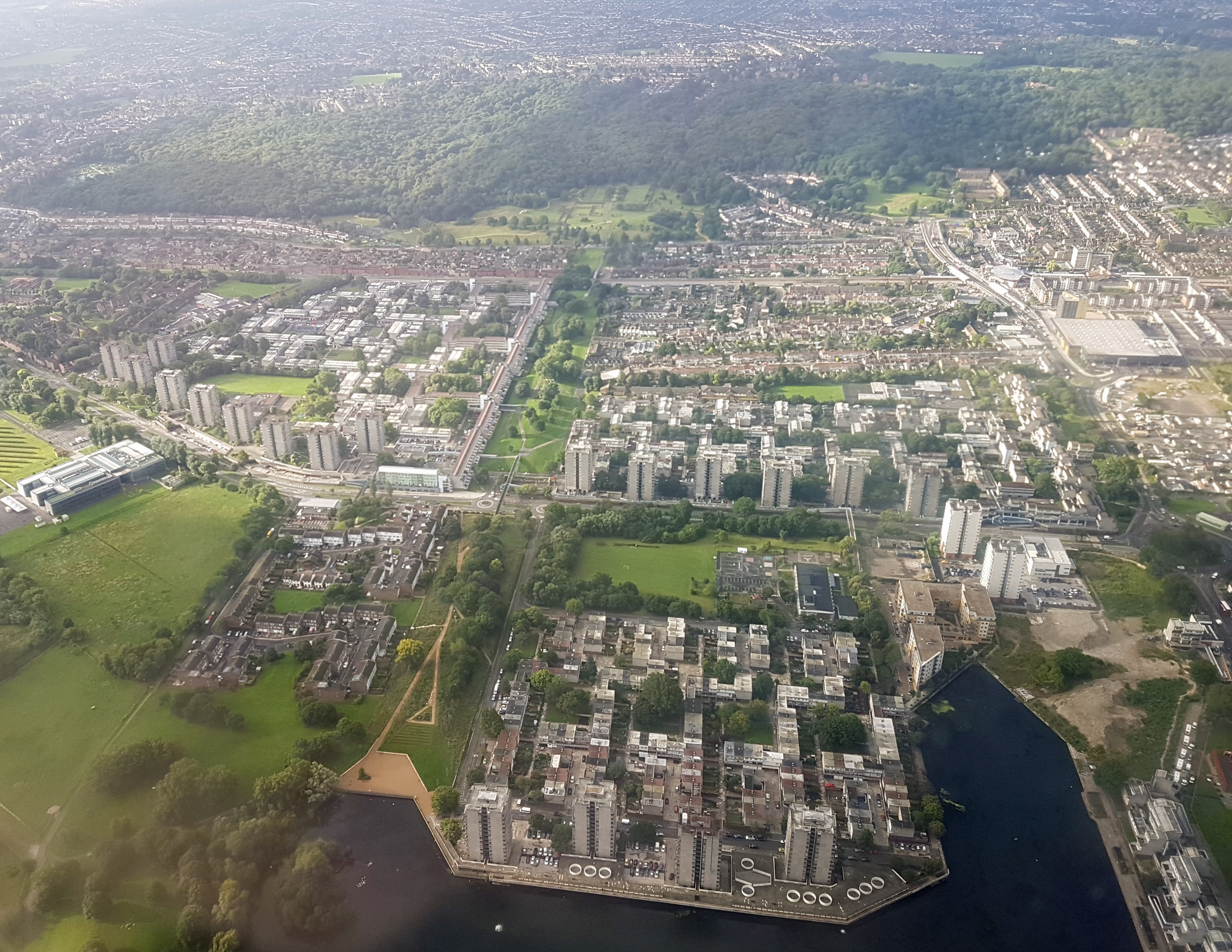
Aerial view, looking south, of Thamesmead South and Central, with Southmere Lake which is fed by the River Wogebourne in the foreground (2017)

Much of Thamesmead was initially built by the Greater London Council (GLC) for rent to families moving from overcrowded back-to-back Victorian housing (also referred to as slums) in south eastern parts of Inner London. The area had been inundated in the Flood of 1953, so the original design placed living accommodation at first floor level or above, used overhead walkways and left the ground level of buildings as garage space. There is also an elevated 'escape route' from the estate to be used in the event of flooding, which runs along the top of a grassed mound to the north of Lesnes neighbourhood.

The first residence was occupied in 1968, but already there were rain penetration problems. The pre-1974 parts of Thamesmead are a mix of modernist town houses, medium-rise and 12-storey blocks system built in concrete, which have featured in various films due to their 'rough urban look'; the design of the newer buildings is more traditional and in brick.

In 1985, the government abolished the GLC. They transferred ownership of Thamesmead to Thamesmead Town Limited (TTL) which was formally established in 1986, following a public vote. Its nine executive directors were local residents; they periodically submitted themselves to re-election. Subsequently six additional paid directors who did not live in the area were appointed.

The design did not accurately predict the lived experience of residents, and many people avoided the elevated pathways linking the houses, choosing instead to walk across open patches of grass included in the landscaping.

=== 21st century ===
==== 2000s ====
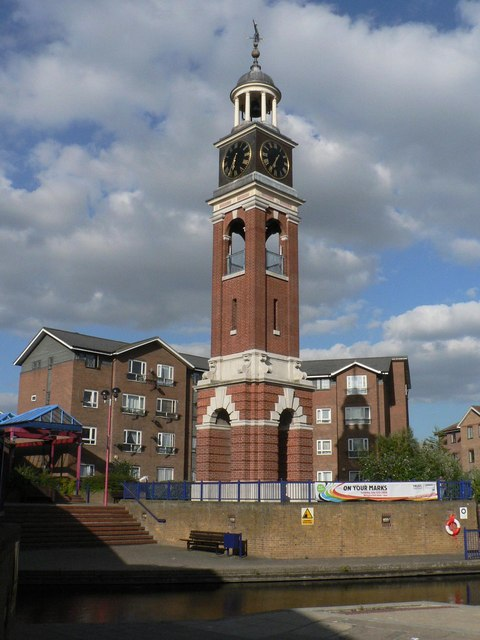
The clocktower, originally in Deptford Dockyard, now in the pedestrianised central shopping area of Thamesmead

In 2000, TTL was wound down and two new organisations were formed. In broad terms, Gallions Housing Association took over the ownership and management of the housing assets whilst Tilfen, later Tilfen Land, took over the remaining undeveloped land. Tilfen is jointly owned by Gallions and Trust Thamesmead. District heating and cable radio broadcasting were pioneered in Thamesmead. The District heating system was decommissioned around 2000; properties connected to it had wet radiator systems installed by the landlord.

The Tavy Bridge area was redeveloped by Gallions in partnership with Wates Group; the plans included homes with dwelling space at ground-floor level, making them susceptible to any future flooding. The Lesnes estate is also planned to be demolished and redeveloped by Bexley Council and the Peabody Trust.

Thamesmead now features a retail park finished in brick anchored around a Morrisons Supermarket; there is also a shopping parade which has mainly service-based outlets such as hairdressers and estate agents. It features a clock tower and a lake. Some of the original overhead pedestrian walkways have been demolished for reasons of public safety and some ground-floor garages have been unfilled, as incidents of crime deterred their use as parking space.

Trust Thamesmead is a registered charity set up to provide community services across Thamesmead. It runs six community centres and a variety of projects promoting social development and work and training projects.

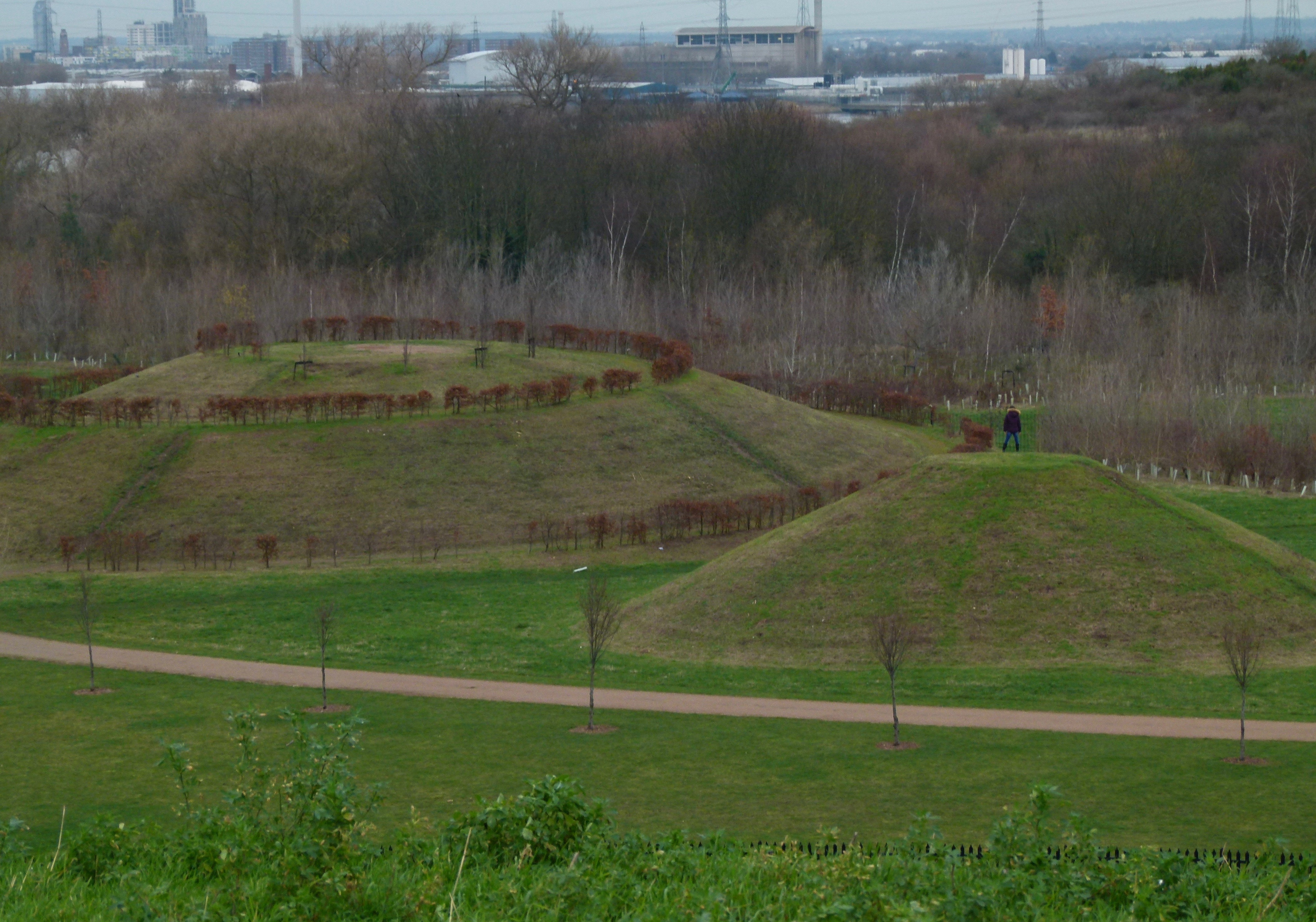
View from Gallions Hill towards Gallions Reach Park

Thamesmead West contains Gallions Ecopark, a pioneering small social/affordable housing development with homes built to high energy efficiency and environmental standards. The estate also includes a small lake and a number of man-made landmarks created from recycled excavated materials that serve as viewing platforms. The biggest of these is the 20 m (66 ft) high Gallions Hill, with a spiral path leading to the summit.

Part of Thamesmead West is also sometimes referred to as Gallions Reach Urban Village. This can lead to confusion, as it is on the opposite bank of the River Thames from Gallions Reach DLR station and Gallions Reach shopping park. There is no Docklands Light Railway, London Underground or rail station in Thamesmead West. Many new build properties in Thamesmead West in the early 21st century have been blighted by social problems and mass repossessions.

In November 2007, Bexley Council marked Thamesmead's 40th birthday with a motion proposed by local Councillor David Leaf and seconded by Councillor John Davey.

==== 2010s ====
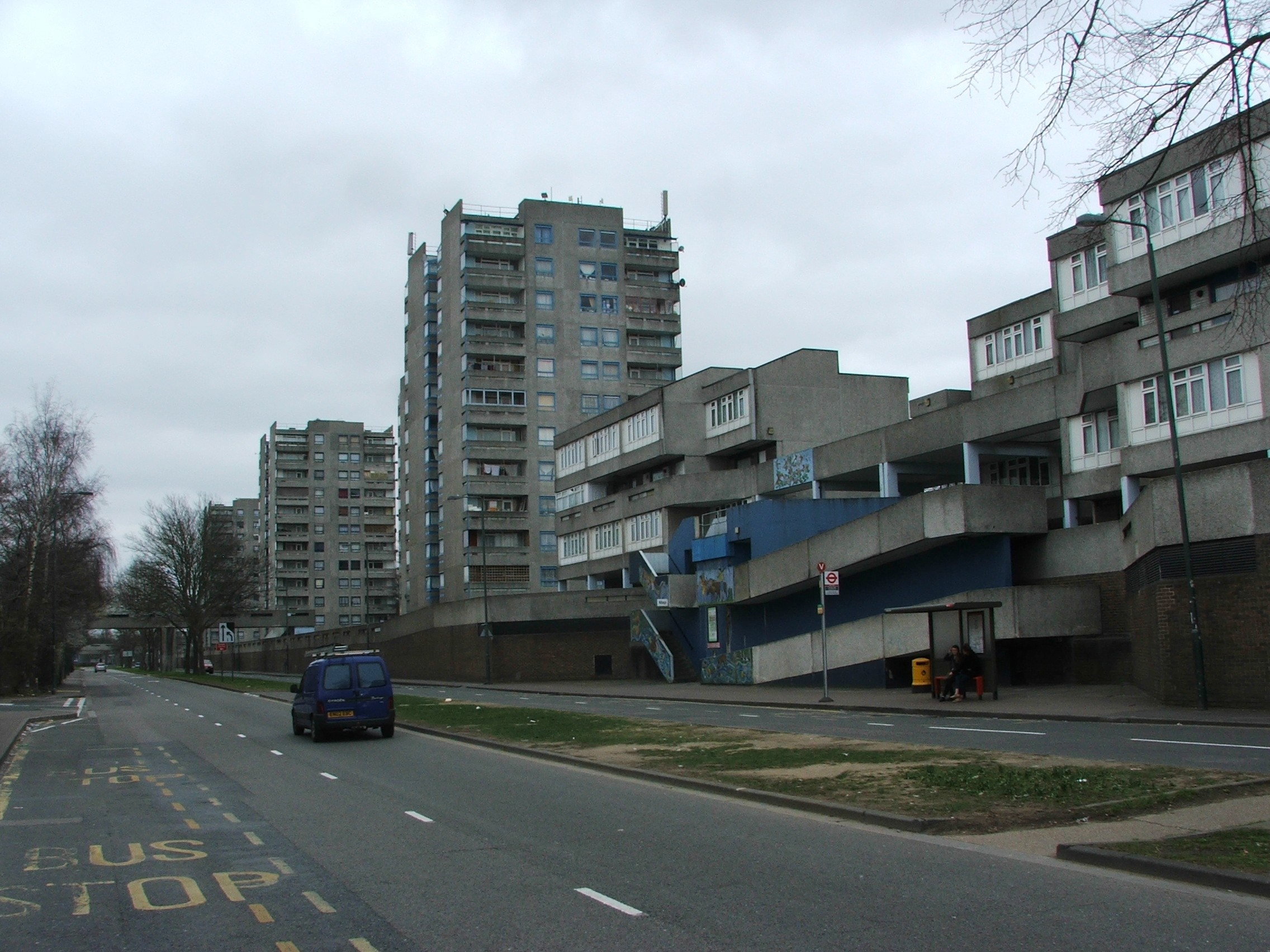
Yarnton Way, Thamesmead (2015)

New housing came under construction by both Gallions Housing Association (for rent and part rent/part buy) and by private developers (for outright sale). Another new development began construction in 2010. The final phase of the Gallions Reach Urban Village (ecopark) is the creation of Gallions Reach Park, a 14.3-acre (5.8 ha) public open space land, between Gallions Hill and the River Thames. Water remains an important feature of several parks and open spaces.

In 2014, Gallions, Tilfen Land and Trust Thamesmead were taken over by Peabody Trust, a London housing association. In 2015, two Housing Zones in Thamesmead were announced by the Mayor of London for the delivery of 2,800 homes. The zones are Abbey Wood and South Thamesmead, between Abbey Wood station and Southmere Lake, and Abbey Wood, Plumstead and Thamesmead. Peabody said in 2018 that it will deliver 20,000 new homes, increasing the number of residents to around 80,000. Peabody's plans to demolish the 1960s concrete blocks and subsequent regeneration was estimated in 2016 to cost £1.5 billion, and expected to be completed by 2024. As part of phase one, 2,000 new homes and 10,000 square metres of offices, shops and leisure space would be built, as well as a new civic square inspired by European piazzas.

==== 2020s ====
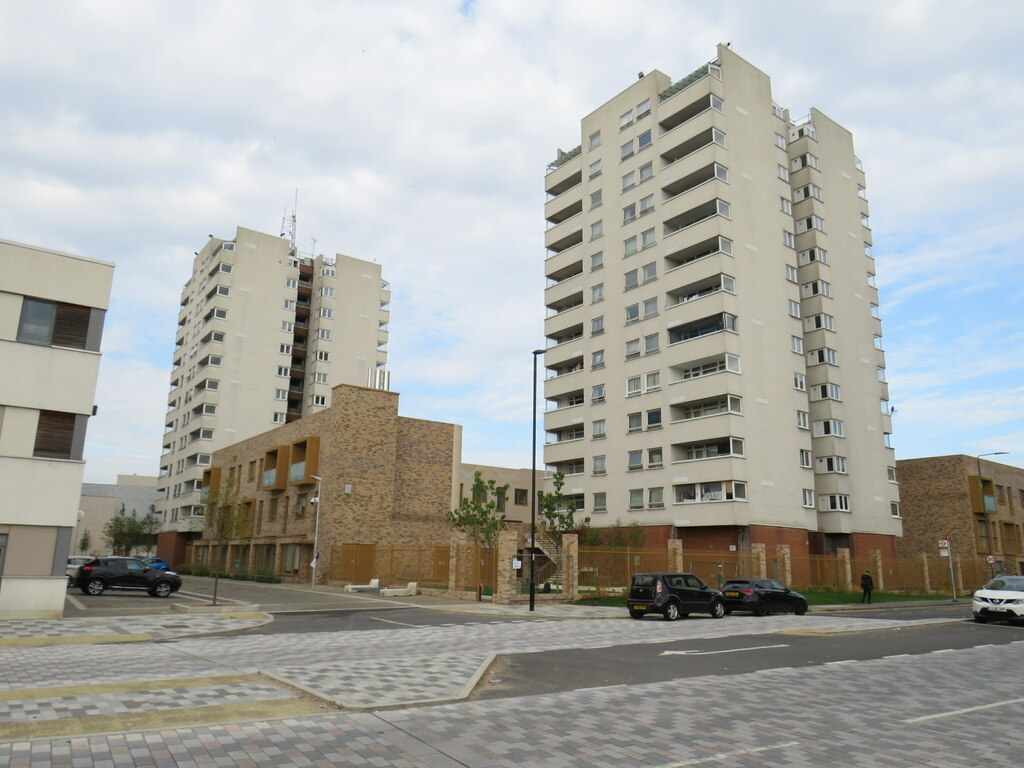
Southmere Village, Thamesmead (2021)

Thamesmead is the only London postcode which does not have a direct train link, with Abbey Wood station being the closest. While a railway extension from Barking Riverside was mooted for several years, Transport for London secured funding in 2020 for a potential Docklands Light Railway extension to Thamesmead on the network's branch to Beckton. A public consultation about the proposed extension was launched in February 2024. The extension forms a major component of the 'Thamesmead Waterfront' redevelopment project, which aims to construct 15,000 new homes on a brownfield site in the area.

Residents of Nigerian descent have nicknamed the area 'Little Lagos', owing to Thamesmead containing one of the United Kingdom's largest British Nigerian communities. However, some Nigerian residents, as well as those of other ethnicities, have protested against what they perceive as the gentrification or 'artwashing' of the area. Additionally, there have been complaints that the new building developments do not match the unique aesthetic of the remaining brutalist buildings from the 1960s.

== Geography ==
Thamesmead is located 11 miles (18 km) east of central London, being on the same latitude as Westminster. In Thamesmead East, the River Thames makes its most northerly incursion within Greater London near the Crossness Sewage Treatment Works.

=== Areas ===
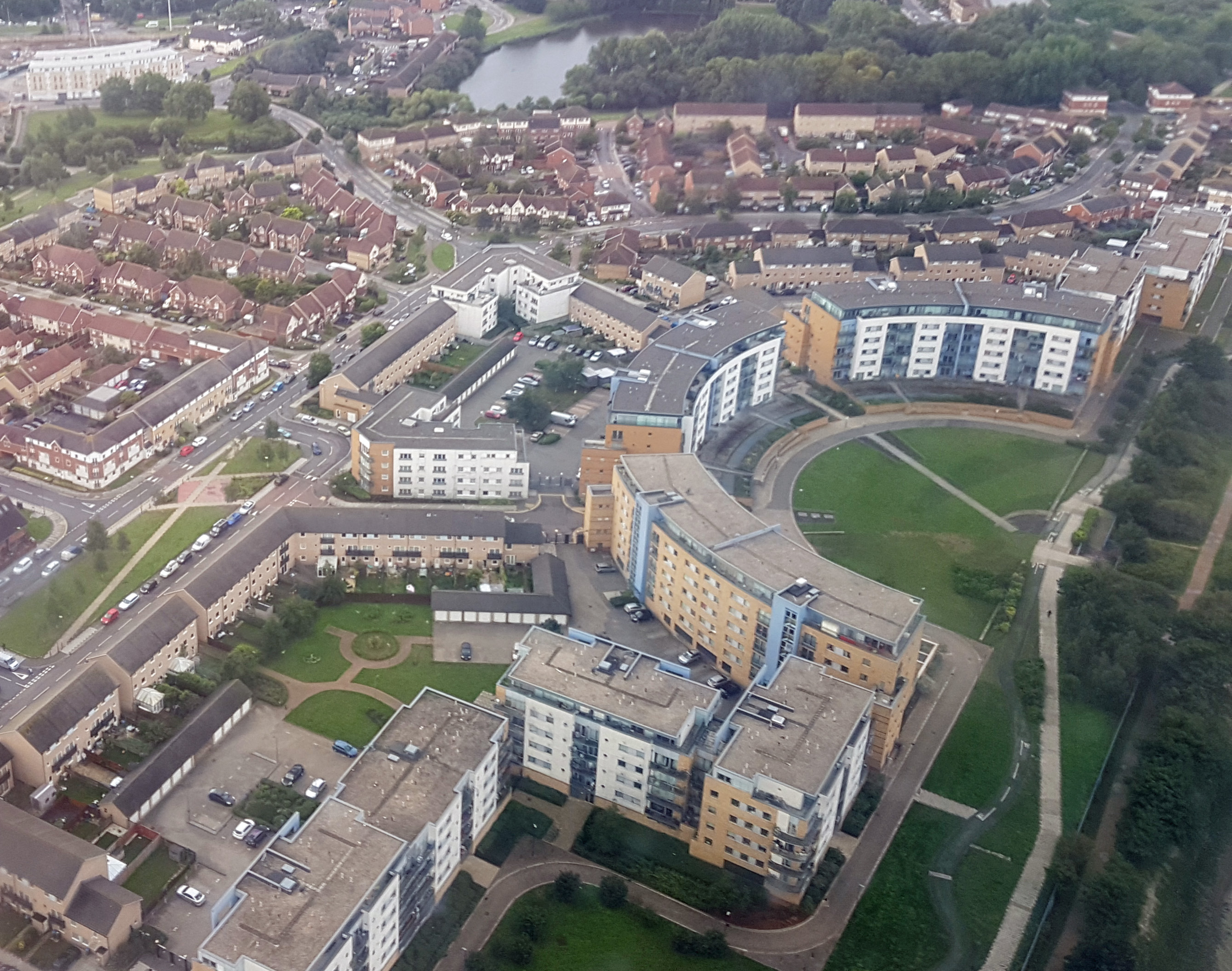
Aerial view of Thamesmead West (2017)

Thamesmead consists of four distinct areas:

- Thamesmead South and Thamesmead East is in Bexley and is the location of the original development built in the late 1960s to early 1970s. The buildings are almost entirely of concrete, in a Cubist/Brutalist/Modernist style, and include a number of high-rise blocks. It is east of Harrow Manorway (A2041) and south of the A2016. Postcode(s): SE2, DA18
- Thamesmead North is in Greenwich and Bexley and is north of the A2016 and east of the A2041. Built from the 1970s onwards, it was initially made up of town houses in grey brick; more recent builds are in red & yellow brick. Postcode(s): SE2, SE28
- Thamesmead Central is in Greenwich and was first developed in the early 1980s in the ring between the A2016 and A2041. It originally consisted of large, sprawling, concrete and red brick, eight- and nine-storey estates overlooking the A2041, and three-storey red-brick town houses. It has spread west of the A2041 and now also includes a number of red and yellow brick homes built from the 1990s onwards. Postcode(s): SE28
- Thamesmead West (also known as Broadwater Green) is in Greenwich near Woolwich and Plumstead (Between Whinchat Road, the A2016 & the banks of the river Thames) and was built from the 1990s onwards. It is a significant distance from the original development and consists mainly of medium density residential development with yellow brick fascias, with towers along the riverside. Postcode(s): SE28

Belmarsh Prison, Isis Prison and Thameside Prison are located on the western edge of the area, while the sewage processing works at Crossness, built in the Victorian era, is on eastern edge of Thamesmead. The southern boundary is the covered Southern Outfall Sewer, which has been landscaped as an elevated footpath called the Ridgeway.

=== Neighbouring areas ===
Nearby areas are: Barking & Dagenham (across the Thames), Belvedere, Abbey Wood, Plumstead, Charlton, Welling, Woolwich, Bexleyheath, Erith and Greenwich.

== Demography ==
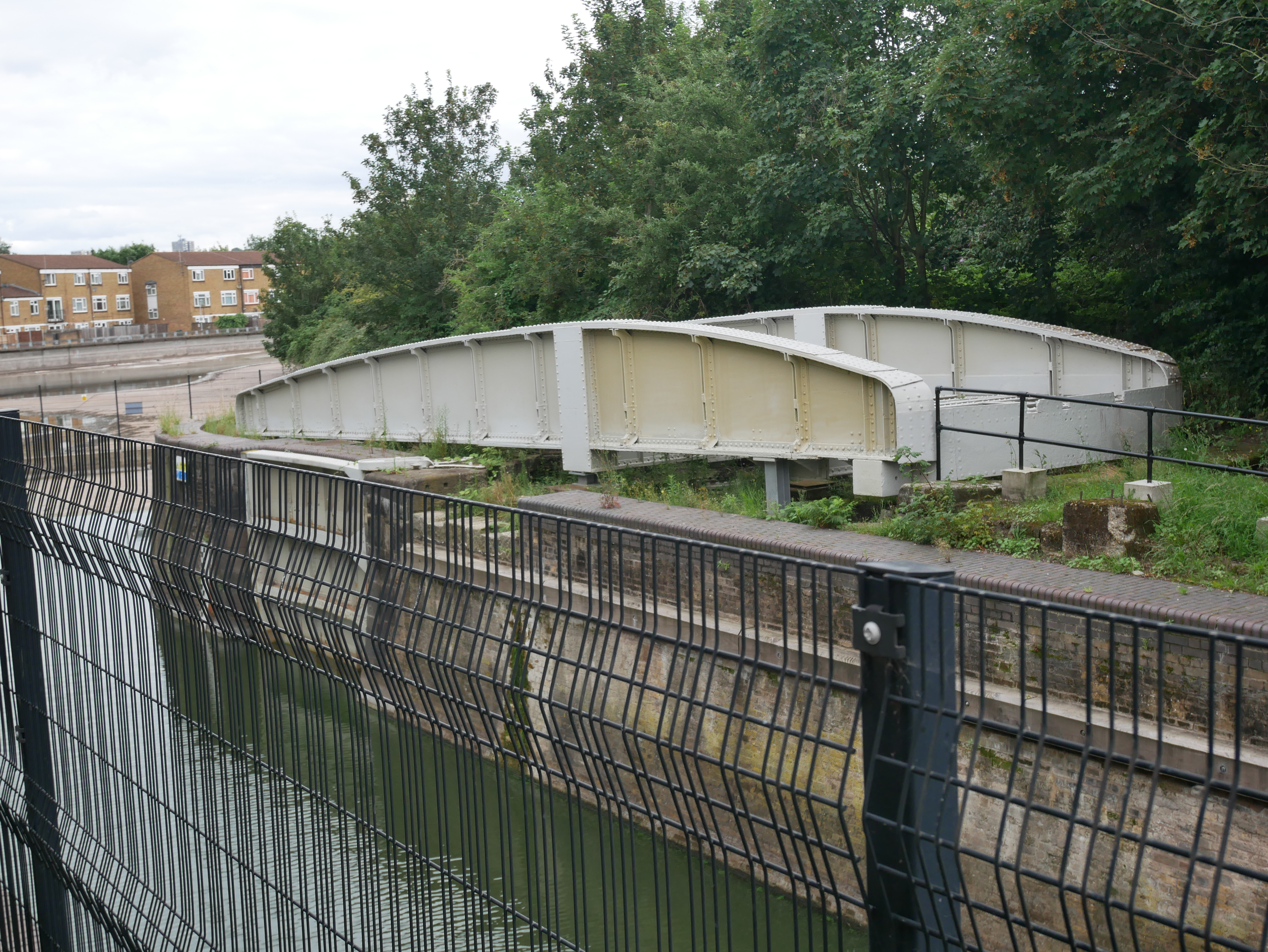
Part of the Grade II listed lock and springbridge on the Broadwater Estate in Thamesmead

Thamesmead's population is increasing rapidly as new developments are being built in the area. Based on mid-2018 estimates, the area's population has reached to 41,121, an increase of almost 30% in seven years over the 2011 figure of 31,824. Because of this, there is an increasing level of demand for the proposed DLR extension from Gallions Reach.

In common with the rest of London, the ethnic make-up of Thamesmead has changed since it was first built. Initially, it was one of the most homogenous estates of its type in London, being predominately white and working class. The lack of London Underground services as well as being at the very edge of the metropolis may have led to Thamesmead not being the first port of call for immigrants arriving in London. The housing selection policy that favoured relatives of existing residents reinforced this aspect.

However, after the Fall of Saigon and the American withdrawal from Vietnam in the late 1970s, a small group of Vietnamese refugees built a community in the area. In the 1990s, another ultimately larger wave of emigration from West Africa (predominately Nigeria and Ghana) began. The 2011 census revealed that 35.58% of residents in the Thamesmead Moorings ward described themselves as Black African, the highest percentage in both London and the UK; Thamesmead East had the second highest at 34.88%.

Thamesmead also adjoins the Thistlebrook Travellers' site which is situated just inside Abbey Wood.

Thamesmead Moorings; ethnicity breakdown:

Black or Black British 42.9%

Black African 35.6%
Black Caribbean 3.8%
Black Other 3.5%

White 42.4%

White British 33.3%
White Irish 0.7%
White Gypsy or Irish Traveller 0.3%
White Other: 8.1%

Asian or Asian British 7.8%

Indian 1.5%
Bangladeshi 0.7%
Pakistani 0.7%
Chinese 2.2%
Other Asian 2.7%

Mixed race 5.3%

White and Black Caribbean 1.7%
White and Black African 1.8%
White and Asian 0.6%
Mixed Other 1.2%

Other ethnic groups 1.7%

Arab 0.3%
Other 1.4%

== Crime ==
Gangs and crime became prevalent in the area in the late 1970s due to high rates of poverty. In the 1980s, there was an increase in racist gangs within Thamesmead and neighbouring areas such as Welling, Erith, Belvedere, Eltham, and Plumstead. The murder of Rolan Adams in 1991 drew international attention to racist violence in the area and is frequently discussed in connection with the murder of Stephen Lawrence, who was killed in a similar incident in nearby Eltham in 1993. From the late 1990s onwards, a significant increase in Afro-Caribbean people moved into the area from abroad (especially from Ghana, Nigeria, and Jamaica) and from inner South London (due to re-housing and gentrification in areas such as Peckham, Camberwell, Walworth and Brixton). In 2009, Thamesmead was found to have the highest rate of credit card fraud in the UK, primarily carried out by criminal gangs of West Africans, particularly Nigerians. BBC News reported that this activity had earned Thamesmead a reputation as 'the fraud capital of the UK', as well as 'Little Lagos'. In 2014, some estate residents claimed that the gang T-Block (now known locally as Greenside or GS28) had been left untouched by police, amid high levels of drug-related crime and violence taking place in Thamesmead and the nearby areas of Abbey Wood and Plumstead. During the mid-to late 2000s and early 2010s, T-Block engaged in a turf war with local gangs Woolwich Boys, Cherry Orchard Boys and R.A. (Welling and Erith), while also forming alliances with other local gangs such as Glyndon Boys, Ferrier Estate Boys and Peckham Boys.

== Education ==
The Bishop John Robinson CofE School is a voluntary-aided primary school with a nursery in Hoveton Road, Thamesmead, named after John Robinson, Bishop of Woolwich. Harris Garrard Academy (formerly Bexley Business Academy) is a secondary school located in Thamesmead. Woolwich Polytechnic School for Boys, as well as Woolwich Polytechnic School for Girls is also located in Thamesmead.

== Transport ==
Despite early proposals for the Jubilee Line Extension to go to Thamesmead, via the Isle of Dogs and the Royal Docks, Thamesmead was not included and after reaching the Greenwich Peninsula, the line heads north to Stratford (via Canning Town and West Ham).

Thamesmead's location between the Thames and the South London escarpment (see North Downs) makes it difficult to build new road and railway infrastructure. As a result, Thamesmead has no underground or above-ground rail lines. With a population of almost 32,000, it is one of the largest districts in Greater London with no railway infrastructure. Most residents travel by bus to the nearest rail stations. There is, however, a disused railway trackbed from Plumstead which originally served the Royal Arsenal. The London Assembly proposed on 4 October 2016 to build an extension of the DLR from Gallions Reach to Thamesmead, and a public consultation about the proposed extension was launched in February 2024.

=== Buses ===
Many bus routes serve the area, all provided by Transport for London.

=== National Rail ===
The nearest stations are Abbey Wood, Belvedere, Plumstead and Woolwich Arsenal for Southeastern services towards Crayford, Dartford, London Cannon Street, London Charing Cross and Thameslink services towards Rainham via Dartford and Luton via Blackfriars. In 2022, Elizabeth line services towards Paddington and Reading were opened at Abbey Wood station.

=== Cycle paths ===
The Ridgeway cycle path, owned by Thames Water, passes through the town from Plumstead Railway station to Crossness Sewage Treatment works, dividing the town into North and South Thamesmead.

== Culture ==
=== Places of worship ===
Places of worship in the area include the Thamesmead Ecumenical Parish, with shared buildings and co-operation by the Methodist Church, Church of England, United Reformed Church and Roman Catholic Church, and the Redeemed Christian Church of God, Goodnews Haven on Nathan Way.

=== Sport and leisure ===
The local football team was formerly Thamesmead Town, founded in 1969, who played at Bayliss Avenue until folding in October 2018 due to budgetary issues. Sporting Club Thamesmead, who had a groundshare deal with Thamesmead Town, continue to play at Bayliss Avenue. As of 2026, they compete in the Southern Counties East League First Division.

The Thamesmead Riverside Walk runs alongside the Thames through Thamesmead West, Thamesmead Central and Thamesmead North and is part of both the Thames Path Southeast Extension and National Cycle Route 1. Thamesmead is also one of the starting points of the Green Chain Walk, which links to places such as Chislehurst and Crystal Palace.

There is a combined swimming pool, fitness centre and library run by Greenwich Council and Greenwich Leisure Limited in Thamesmead Central (The Thamesmere Centre).

=== Library ===
In 2026, a newly constructed library called The Nest was chosen by Poet Laureate Simon Armitage as one of the venues for his annual library tour which in that year visited libraries in places with initials N-P.

=== Music ===
There was a short-range commercial radio station 106.8 Time FM (now defunct), that grew from the original cable (subsequently FM) service "Radio Thamesmead". Radio Thamesmead was revived in 2018 as part of Thamesmead's 50th anniversary celebrations and still broadcasts, run by volunteers.

The music video of "Come to Daddy" by electronic musician Aphex Twin, directed by Chris Cunningham, was shot in Thamesmead in 1997. The estate is featured in The Libertines' music video for "What Became of the Likely Lads in 2004. The Kaiser Chiefs filmed the music video for their song "Never Miss a Beat" in Thamesmead. The music video for New York rapper A$AP Rocky's and London rapper Skepta's song "Praise the Lord (Da Shine)" was partially filmed in Thamesmead in 2018, with the estate featuring prominently alongside shots of the New York projects throughout the music video. The music video for American producer Skrillex and British producer Four Tet's song "Butterflies" was filmed in Thamesmead in 2021. Primal Scream filmed their song "The Centre Cannot Hold" in Thamesmead in 2024.

=== Film and TV ===
The Tavy Bridge area of Thamesmead South, including Southmere Lake, was used as a setting for the Stanley Kubrick film A Clockwork Orange (1971). The estate was featured prominently in the film The Optimists of Nine Elms (1973) starring Peter Sellers. Thamesmead is seen as a new and better alternative through the eyes of two small children who live in older, dilapidated flats in Nine Elms, Battersea. Football hooligan film The Firm (1989), starring Gary Oldman, was filmed in Thamesmead, as was the Channel 4 coming-of-age film Beautiful Thing (1996). The British E4 superhero drama Misfits (2009–2013) was filmed mainly in Thamesmead, known as 'Wertham' in the series. The crime film The Guvnors (2014), starring David Essex, was filmed on location in the area, with several scenes taking place in The Barge Pole flat-roofed pub, which was demolished in 2018. BBC One drama series Informer (2018), and BBC One comedy series Black Ops (2023–present) was filmed in the area.

== Notable people ==
- Enny, rapper
- Jnr Choi, rapper
- Karlan Grant, footballer
- Kate Herron, director
- Ryan Barrett, former boxer
- Shantell Martin, visual artist
- Stella English, winner of The Apprentice (series 6)
- Tobi Sho-Silva, footballer
- Tony Craig, footballer
- Twist and Pulse, street dancers
- Weruche Opia, actress

== See also ==
- List of schools in Bexley
- List of schools in Greenwich
