= Barrie Linklater =

British equestrian painter & illustrator (1931–2017)

- Born: 11 June 1931; Birmingham
- Died: 24 March 2017 (aged 85)
- Alma mater: Woolwich Polytechnic School for Boys
- Occupation: Illustrator, painter
- Website: http://www.barrielinklater.co.uk/

Barrie Reith Linklater (11 June 1931 – 24 March 2017) was a British illustrator and painter, latterly specialising in equine subjects.

Linklater was born in Birmingham, then in Warwickshire, England, on 11 June 1931.

He was educated at Woolwich Polytechnic School of Art.

He first worked as an illustrator in London, then in 1957 moved to Australia for four years where he worked as a freelancer. He worked for publications including Look and Learn.

In 1975 he was commissioned by the Welsh Guards to paint a portrait of Prince Philip, Duke of Edinburgh, depicted in his uniform as their Colonel, and holding his horse. This led to a commission from Philip to paint the Queen's favorite horses and ponies, as his gift to her, for her silver jubilee. For her golden jubilee, the Honourable Artillery Company commissioned a painting depicting her arrival at St Paul's Cathedral for the service of thanksgiving, in the Gold State Coach.

His 1989 painting of the racehorse Desert Orchid was auctioned by Bonhams in July 2007.

The Ascot Authority commissioned him to paint Frankie Dettori riding all seven winners in one day there, in September 1996.

Linklater exhibited at London's Guildhall and at the Royal Society of Portrait Painters. He had solo exhibitions at Spinks and at the Waterhouse Gallery.

He was a member of the Society of Equestrian Artists.

He died in March 2017.

The British Royal Collection holds some of his works.
