= HM Prison Thameside =

Prison in London, England

Coordinates: 51.4941°N 0.0891°E

HMP Thameside
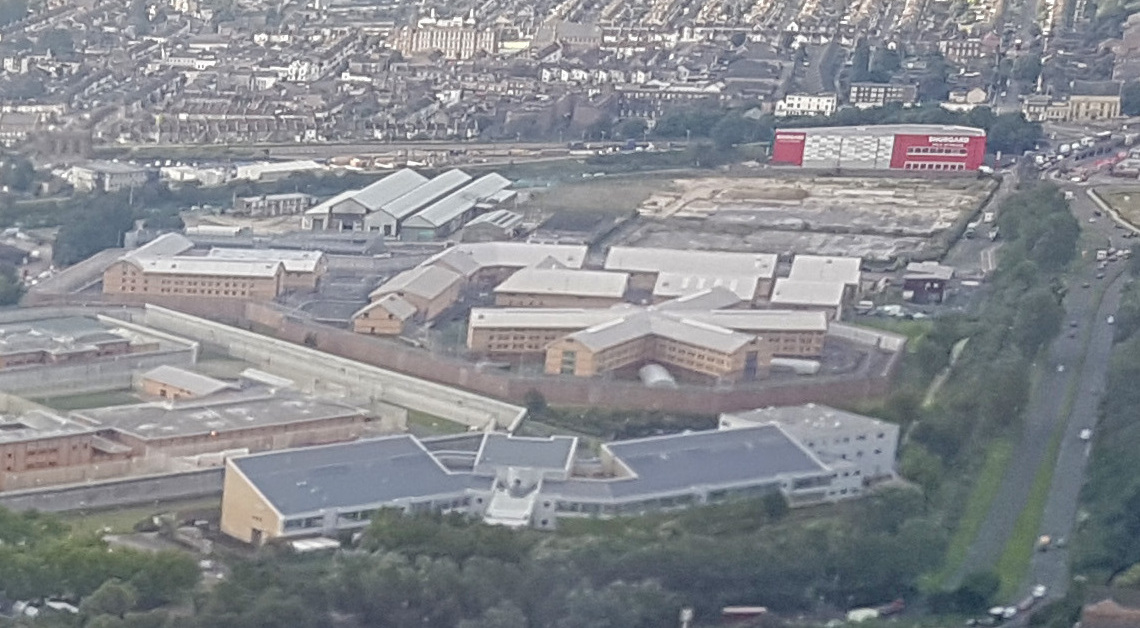
- Aerial view of HM Prison Thameside. To the left, a section of HM Prison Belmarsh.
- Interactive map of HMP Thameside
- Location: Thamesmead, London, England
- Security class: Adult Male/Category B
- Population: 1,232 (February 2017)
- Opened: March 2012
- Managed by: Serco
- Director: Dave Bamford

HM Prison Thameside is a Category B men's private prison in the Thamesmead area of the Royal Borough of Greenwich, south-east London, England. Thameside Prison is operated by Serco and is situated next to Belmarsh and Isis prisons.

== History ==
The prison was designed and constructed by Serco and opened on 30 March 2012, becoming fully operational in the autumn of 2012, with a capacity of 900. It holds prisoners from courts previously served by Brixton Prison and other prisons in London.

In January 2013, the Ministry of Justice announced that an additional houseblock would be constructed at Thameside Prison, increasing its capacity.

In May 2013, a report by the Chief Inspector of Prisons was critical of the levels of violence at the prison and its restricted regime. The report found that there was a high level of assaults and use of force, while 60% of prisoners were locked up during the working day, and some inmates spent 23 hours a day in their cells. However, the report also praised the quality of accommodation throughout the prison.

== The prison today ==
The regimen at Thameside Prison combines work, education, vocational training, accredited offending behaviour programmes, and prisoner health and appropriate interventions. It is a Local category B establishment.

The prison has a baseline Certificate of Normal Accommodation of 932, and an in-use operational capacity of 1232 convicted and remand male prisoners.
