= HM Prison Isis =

Young offenders' institution in London

Coordinates: 51.49412°N 0.08915°E

HMP Isis
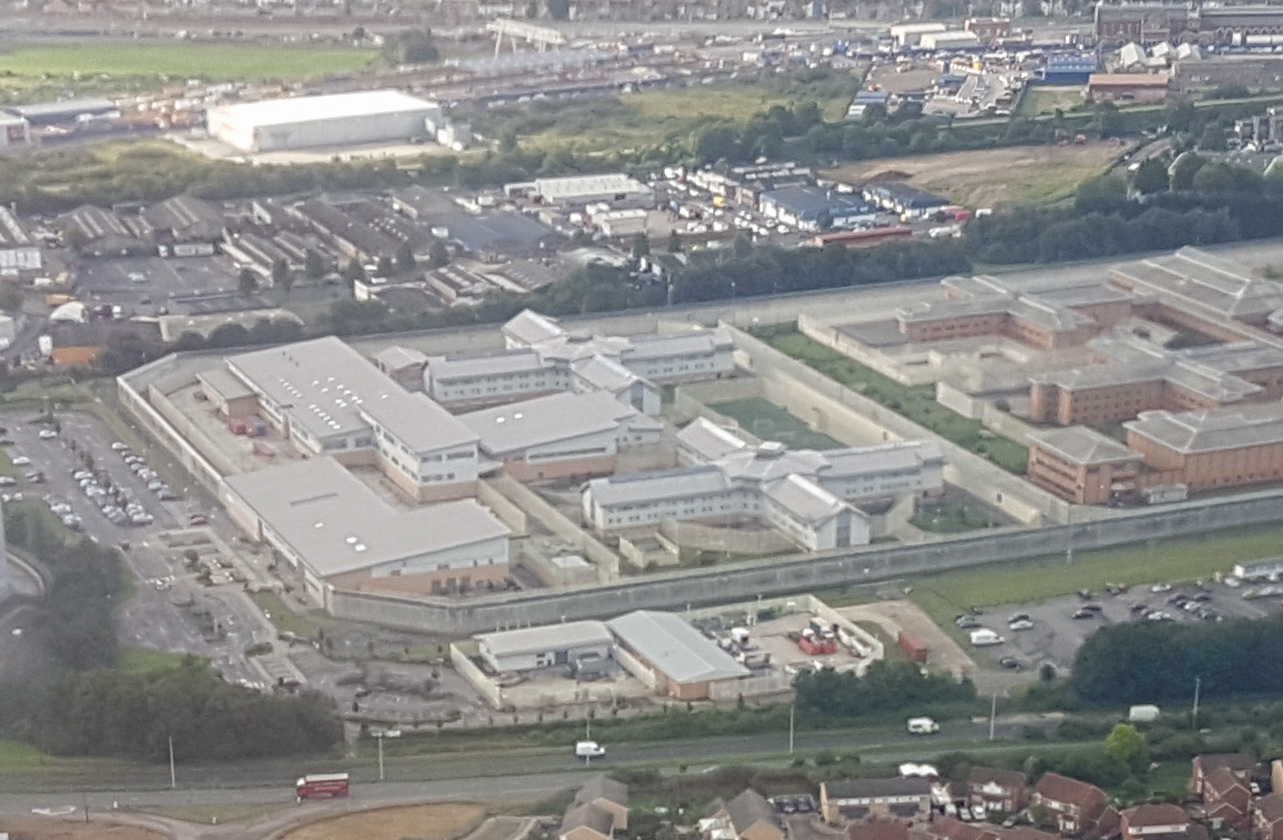
- HMP Isis adjacent to HMP Belmarsh (right)
- Interactive map of HMP Isis
- Location: Thamesmead, London, SE28
- Security class: Young Offenders Institution
- Population: 622 (June 2011)
- Opened: 2010
- Managed by: HM Prison Services
- Governor: Emily Thomas
- Website: Isis at justice.gov.uk

His Majesty’s Prison Isis is a Category C male Young Offenders Institution, located in the Thamesmead area of the Royal Borough of Greenwich, in south-east London, England. The Prison is operated by His Majesty's Prison Service, and is situated next to Belmarsh Prison and Thameside Prison.

== History ==
In May 2009, the Ministry of Justice awarded Interserve a £110 million contract to design and construct a new prison called Isis (named for an alternative name for the River Thames) on underused land within the perimeter wall of Belmarsh Prison. The new prison was built to Category B security standards. In August 2009, the construction site of the new prison was evacuated after contractors discovered a suspected World War II bomb. Isis Prison is located on the site of the former Royal Arsenal, and the suspected bomb was found to be an empty shell casing. Interserve handed over the completed Isis Prison in April 2010, with the prison becoming operational soon after.

In January 2012, an inspection report by the Chief Inspector of Prisons criticised faulty technology which was being used at the prison. The report also found that the combination of new and transferred staff was causing problems in forming good staff-prisoner relations at the jail. However the report praised the prison's resettlement services, low drug use and support of prisoners at risk of self-harm. A month later, inmates at Isis claimed that there was a significant gang culture developing in the prison. Isis prison governor, Grahame Hawkins, admitted that gangs were a problem in the prison.

== The prison today ==
As a Young Offenders Institution and C-cat prison Isis holds male offenders aged from 18 (there is no maximum age). Accommodation comprises a mixture of single and double cells in two house blocks. The prison also has an entry building and a central activities centre (which houses a learning academy, segregation unit and PE academy). However, the prison does not have in-patient healthcare facilities.

Education and vocational training at the prison is delivered in partnership with Kensington and Chelsea College. Courses include mechanics (motorbike repair), construction, waste management, bicycle repair, barbering, catering, reprographics, broadcasting and media studies, ESOL and job related studies.

There is a visitor's centre at Isis Prison which is run by the Spurgeons charity. The visits complex consists of a main room, a supervised children's play area, a refreshment counter and vending machines.
