= HM Prison Belmarsh =

Men's prison in Thamesmead, London, England

Coordinates: 51.4964°N 0.0929°E

HMP Belmarsh
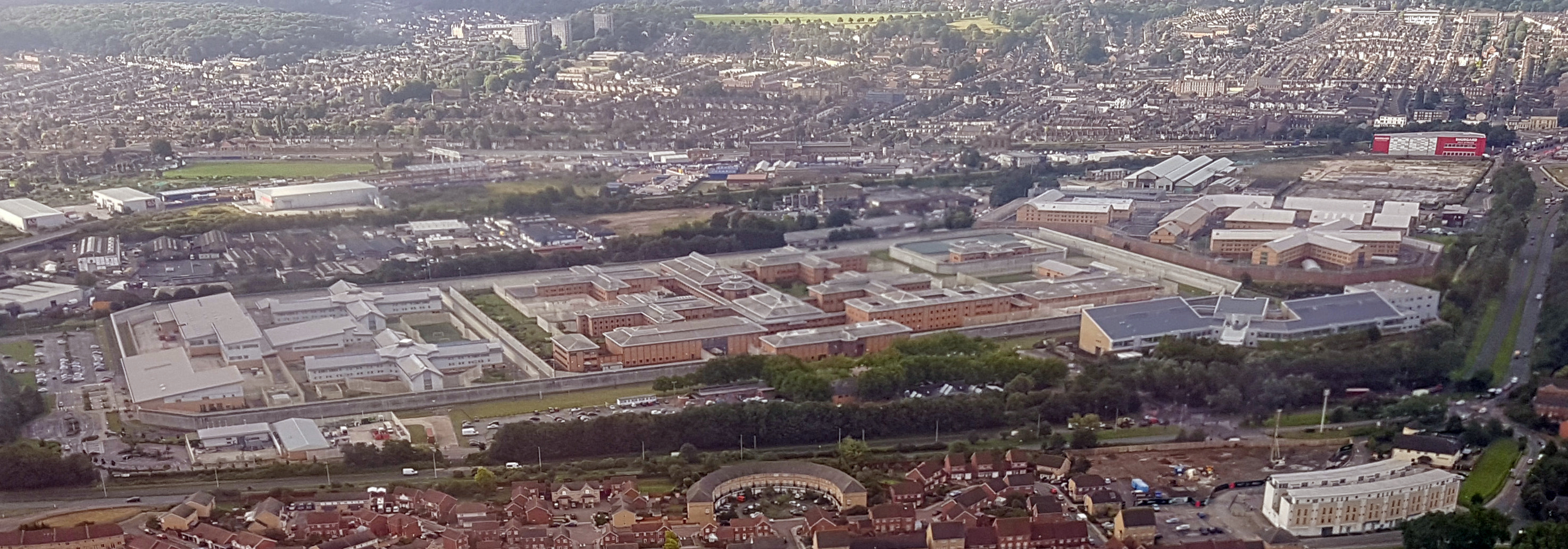
- Aerial view of HM Prison Belmarsh (centre). To the left is HMP Isis, to the right is HMP Thameside
- Interactive map of HMP Belmarsh
- Location: Western Way, Thamesmead, London, SE28 0EB
- Security class: Adult Male/Category A
- Capacity: 792
- Population: 675 (August 2021)
- Opened: 1991; 35 years ago
- Managed by: HM Prison Services
- Governor: Jenny Louis
- Website: Belmarsh at justice.gov.uk

His Majesty's Prison Belmarsh is a Category A men's prison located in Thamesmead, south-east London, England. Belmarsh Prison is run by His Majesty's Prison Service and is situated next to HMP Isis and HMP Thameside. The prison is used for high-profile prisoners, particularly those concerning national security. Within the grounds of the prison is the High Security Unit (HSU), consisting of 48 single cells.

Belmarsh is nicknamed "Hellmarsh," owing to the high number of physical and authority abuses reported by both the prison's inmates (including former politician Jeffrey Archer, who coined the name and was imprisoned there for two years for perjury), and human rights activists.

== History ==
Belmarsh Prison was built on part of the East site of the former Royal Arsenal in Woolwich and became operational on 2 April 1991. It adjoins Woolwich Crown Court.

In 1991, the armed robber Ronnie Field, an associate of London gangland boss Joey Pyle, was the first person to be held in Belmarsh's High Security Unit, shortly followed by members of the Arifs, a south-east London-based Turkish Cypriot gang, and those convicted of the £10 million Heathrow airport diamond heist.

Between 2001 and 2002, Belmarsh Prison was used to detain a number of people indefinitely without charge or trial under the provisions of Part 4 of the Anti-terrorism, Crime and Security Act 2001, leading it to be called the "British version of Guantanamo Bay". The Law Lords later ruled in A v Secretary of State for the Home Dept that such imprisonment was discriminatory and against the Human Rights Act 1998.

It is often used for detention for terrorist-related offences. In September 2006, 51 such prisoners were held.

In 2009, an archaeological dig on the site led to the discovery of a nearly 6,000-year-old wooden trackway, which, behind Sweet Track near Glastonbury is the second oldest discovered in the British Isles.

In November 2009, an inspection report from the Chief Inspector of Prisons criticised the "extremely high" amount of force used to control inmates. The report also stated that an unusually high number of prisoners had reported being intimidated or victimised by staff.

In 2010, HMP Isis Young Offenders Institution opened within its perimeter wall.

Jenny Louis, when appointed governor in February 2021, was Britain’s first female black prison governor.

== The prison today ==
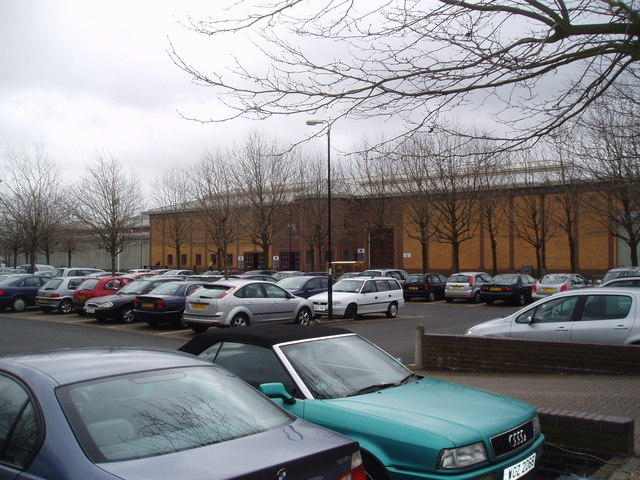
Car park and main entrance

Belmarsh is a Category A Prison holding inmates from all over England and Wales. It also houses other categories of prisoners from primarily the Central Criminal Court (Old Bailey) and Magistrates' Courts in South East London, as well as Crown and Magistrates' Courts in South West Essex. Accommodation at the prison is a mixture of approximately 60% multi-occupancy cells and 40% single cells, distributed mainly across four residential units.

Inmates at Belmarsh have access to education, workshops and two gyms. The gym staff have a partnership with Charlton Athletic F.C. to deliver FA accredited coaching courses for prisoners.

A listener scheme for prisoners at risk from suicide or self-harm is in operation, as well as a support group providing advice on immigration law for foreign national prisoners.

== Notable inmates ==
=== Current inmates ===
- Ali Harbi Ali, murdered MP David Amess.
- Hashem Abedi, aided in the Manchester Arena Bombing alongside his brother Salman Abedi.
- Paul 'Des' Ballard, television presenter and stage actor; caused death by dangerous driving; convicted of rape.
- Kyle Clifford, rapist and killer who committed Hunt family murders in July 2024. Also known as the "Crossbow Killer."
- David Copeland, neo-Nazi who bombed Brixton Market, Brick Lane, and a gay pub in Soho.
- Louis De Zoysa, shot dead an on-duty police sergeant at Croydon police station in September 2020.
- Mark Gordon, sex offender who was convicted of the gross negligence manslaughter of his newborn daughter after going on the run in 2023.
- Delroy Grant, the "Night Stalker", serial rapist and burglar.
- Danyal Hussein, murdered two sisters in a London park.
- Simon Levy, murdered two women, raped another and committed various other sex offences.
- Kay-O, (Kamar Henry-Richards). Participated in the gangland murder of 25-year-old Kacey Boothe in August 2022 and convicted with additional firearms and conspiracy charges.
- Yostin Mosquera, murdered two men and attempted to dispose of their remains at Clifton Suspension Bridge in July 2024.
- Stephen Port, the "Grindr Killer", serial killer and serial rapist.
- Nicholas Prosper, shot dead his mother, brother and sister and also plotted to carry out a school shooting.
- Khairi Saadallah, stabbed three people to death in a Reading park, seriously injured others.

=== Former inmates ===
- Michael Adebowale - moved to Broadmoor Hospital.
- Jonathan Aitken - convicted in 1999 of perjury and perverting the course of justice following a collapsed libel case against The Guardian.
- Abu Hamza al-Masri - sentenced to life imprisonment in the United States; incarcerated at ADX Florence.
- Sudesh Amman - convicted in 2018 of terrorist offences and imprisoned for three years and four months, before going on to perpetrate the 2020 Streatham stabbing, leading to his death following his release from prison.
- Jeffrey Archer - convicted in 2001 of perjury and perverting the course of justice after providing false information to the police during a civil case in 1987.
- Julian Assange - accused by the United States of espionage.
- Ronnie Biggs - one of the 11 men convicted of planning and carrying out the Great Train Robbery of 1963. Later released on compassionate grounds in 2009 due to declining health.
- Charles Bronson - convicted of several offences related to incidents in prison, including grievous bodily harm and criminal damage.
- David Carrick - moved to HM Prison Full Sutton.
- Anjem Choudary - Islamist cleric convicted in 2016 and 2024 of terrorist offences.
- Wayne Couzens - moved to HM Prison Frankland.
- Paul Doyle - moved to HM Prison Wakefield.
- Richard Huckle - moved to HM Prison Full Sutton, where he was later murdered.
- Ian Huntley - moved to HM Prison Frankland in 2008.
- Daniel Khalife - moved to HM Prison Frankland
- Usman Khan - previously convicted of terrorist offences in 2012, before eventually carrying out the 2019 London Bridge stabbings, which resulted in his death.
- Denis MacShane - convicted in 2013 of false accounting and imprisoned for six months, before later being moved to HM Prison Brixton to serve the rest of his sentence.
- Thomas Mair - moved to HM Prison Frankland
- Jordan McSweeney - moved to HM Prison Long Lartin.
- Marcus Monzo - moved to Broadmoor Hospital.
- Darren Osborne - murdered one person and attempted to murder others by driving into them; moved to HM Prison Full Sutton.
- Maurice Robinson - moved to HM Prison Lowdham Grange.
- Tommy Robinson - anti-Islam campaigner and far-right activist.
- Axel Rudakubana - convicted of possessing terrorist material and ricin; murdered 3 children and attempted to murder 10 others in the 2024 Southport stabbings. He was later moved to Broadmoor Hospital in 2026, after being declared “medically unfit” for a prison environment.
- Urfan Sharif - moved to HM Prison Frankland.
- Richard Tomlinson - convicted in 1997 of leaking confidential government documents to a British newspaper.
- John Worboys - moved to HM Prison Wakefield.
