= List of prisoners with whole life orders =

This is a list of prisoners who have received a whole-life order, formerly called a whole-life tariff, through some mechanism in jurisdictions of the United Kingdom. From the introduction of the whole-life order system in 1983 until an appeal by a prisoner named Anthony Anderson in 2002, a whole-life order was set by government ministers. Thereafter only a judicial body could decide to impose such an order. The effect of a whole-life order is that the prisoner serves the sentence of life imprisonment without the possibility of parole.

Whole-life orders have been reportedly issued in more than 100 cases since introduction in 1983, although some of these prisoners have had their sentences reduced on appeal. By 2026, there were believed to be around 90 prisoners currently serving whole-life sentences in England and Wales. These include some of Britain's most notorious criminals, including the serial murderer Rosemary West and the premature baby serial killer Lucy Letby.

Several prisoners serving whole-life sentences have challenged the legality of whole-life sentences in the High Court or European Court of Human Rights. These include Jeremy Bamber and Gary Vinter, whose second legal challenge to the European Court of Human Rights was successful, although the High Court later ruled that whole-life sentences could still be issued as long as they were reviewed within 25 years. Arthur Hutchinson has challenged his sentence several times in both the High Court and the European Court of Human Rights, but has been unsuccessful each time.

Despite the fact that government ministers can no longer decide when or if a life sentence prisoner can be considered for parole, they still retain the power to release a prisoner from their sentences on compassionate grounds. This normally includes cases only when a prisoner is of great age or in ill health.

A number of prisoners have had their sentences reduced on appeal by the High Court.

Several months before ministers were stripped of their powers to set minimum sentences, the High Court also stripped ministers of their power to overrule the Parole Board's decision that a life sentence prisoner can be paroled.

== Imposed by Home Secretaries ==
Successive Home Secretaries are known to have imposed whole-life orders for at least 23 murderers between 1983 and 2002 (note, this list is incomplete). In 2002, a former Junior Home Office Minister during the 1980s, Douglas Hogg, admitted to setting 600 tariffs between 1986 and 1989 on behalf of the Home Secretary.

Name	Year	Died	Notes
John Thomas Straffen	1952	2007	Britain's longest-serving prisoner, who spent 55 years in prison until his death. Straffen was convicted of murdering two prepubescent girls in July 1951. The following year, he escaped for a four-hour period and was convicted of murdering another girl during this short spell at large, although he long proclaimed his innocence. Straffen was reprieved from a death sentence owing to learning difficulties, and instead remained in prison for the rest of his life. He died at Frankland prison in November 2007, aged 77. For the final five years of his life, he was the oldest prisoner known to be serving a whole-life tariff, following the death of Archibald Hall.
Ian Duncan Brady (né Ian Duncan Stewart)	1966	2017	One of the Moors murderers who was convicted, in May 1966, of murdering three children between 1963 and 1965. He was convicted just six months after the abolition of the death penalty, and less than two years after final executions in Britain. His trial judge said it was unlikely that Brady could ever be rehabilitated and suitable for parole, although that the same was not necessarily true of Hindley once removed from Brady's influence. By 1994, it had been confirmed that Brady was one of a small group of prisoners who had been issued with a whole-life tariff. With accomplice Myra Hindley, he buried the children in shallow graves on Saddleworth Moor. From being declared insane in 1985 until his death he was held in a mental hospital and was on long-term hunger strike, which led to him being force-fed through a tube. In 2001, he published a book on serial killing. The body of one of his victims, 12-year-old Keith Bennett, remains undiscovered on the Moor, despite Brady's and Hindley's own heavily guarded efforts to locate the remains themselves after they admitted two further murders in 1986; they both did, however, guide police to the buried body of 16-year-old Pauline Reade in 1987. Brady never made a legal challenge against his whole-life tariff and made it clear long before his death that he did not want to be paroled. He died, aged 79, at Ashworth Hospital in May 2017.
Myra Hindley	1966	2002	The other of the Moors Murderers, Ian Brady's girlfriend and accomplice who was involved in all five murders with Brady. She was convicted of two of three murders which were detected in 1965, and of being an accessory in the third murder, as she was not present when Brady committed the murder. The convictions of Brady and Hindley came just six months after the abolition of the death penalty, and less than two years after the last execution in Britain – although more than 10 years had passed since the last execution of a woman in Britain. In 1986, she and Brady confessed to two more murders and returned to the moors to help police find the body of one of the victims, although the final body has still not been found. Hindley's trial judge recommended she should serve at least 25 years in prison, feeling that unlike Brady there was a possibility that Hindley could be rehabilitated and suitable for parole – once removed from Brady's influence. The 25-year minimum term was endorsed in 1982 by the Lord Chief Justice. By this stage, reports suggested that Hindley was rehabilitating in prison and had found religion and rejected Brady and her past, but her tariff was increased to 30 years in 1985 and, finally, to a whole-life tariff in 1990, although she was not informed of the whole-life tariff until December 1994. In 1986, she and Brady had both confessed to two additional murders and helped the police locate one of the bodies the following year. Hindley's supporters, including penal reformer Lord Longford, journalist David Astor and prison governor Peter Timms, claimed that the increase in Hindley's sentence was the response of a succession of Home Secretaries to public opinion, as there was widespread media and public opposition to Hindley ever being released, and similarly widespread doubt as to whether her reported remorse and rehabilitation were genuine – the fact that she had not admitted the two additional murders until 20 years into her sentence further strengthened the argument of those who felt that her reported turnaround was nothing more than an attempt to boost her chances of parole. Her claims that Brady had bullied and blackmailed her into taking part into killings were also met with similar doubt by the public and media. Relatives of the Moors Murders victims were at the centre of a campaign to keep Hindley imprisoned and several of them vowed to kill her if she was ever paroled. Hindley subsequently made three appeals against the whole-life tariff, but each appeal was unsuccessful, and she died in jail at the age of 60 in November 2002, just over a week before a long-anticipated High Court ruling which had been expected to secure her freedom. The question as to whether Hindley should ever be released prompted more debate than that of any other prisoner of notoriety, with some high-profile backing from her supporters, but vitriol from the tabloid press and the public, as well as the families of her victims. Lord Longford was at the centre of the campaign for Hindley to be paroled, and condemned the media for their "exploitation" of Ann West, mother of victim Lesley Ann Downey. Ann West gave regular newspaper and television interviews to argue against any suggestion of Hindley ever being released from prison, and vowed to kill Hindley if she ever was released. Her death left only Rosemary West (jailed for life for 10 murders in 1995) as a female prisoner serving a whole-life tariff, until the addition of Joanna Dennehy in 2014, and Lucy Letby in 2023.
Raymond Leslie Morris	1969	2014	Morris was named by police as the perpetrator of the Cannock Chase murders, which comprised the abduction, rape and murder of three girls aged between 5 and 7 between 1965 and 1967, and the kidnapping and rape of nine-year-old Julia Taylor. However, he was only convicted of the final murder, that of seven-year-old Christine Darby, and of the attempted abduction of 10-year-old Margaret Aulton and creation of child pornography featuring his five-year-old niece. Although Morris was never officially confirmed to have been among the prisoners issued with a whole-life tariff, Morris remained in prison for 45 years until his death at HMP Preston on 11 March 2014.
Donald Neilson	1976	2011	The Black Panther, nicknamed for wearing a black balaclava, shot dead three postmasters during robberies in various areas of the country, then abducted a 17-year-old heiress from her Shropshire home. He attempted to ransom the heiress, but her body was found two months later in a drain in Bathpool Park, Staffordshire. He was convicted in July 1976 after being caught when two police officers he took hostage overpowered him in Nottinghamshire seven months earlier. In 2008, Neilson lost an appeal to have his tariff reduced to 30 years, the original minimum sentence recommended by the trial judge. He remained in prison until his death three years later at the age of 75, having served 36 years.
Trevor Joseph Hardy	1976	2012	Trevor Joseph Hardy murdered three teenage girls between December 1974 and March 1976. Janet Lesley Stewart, 15, was murdered on New Year's Eve 1974 and buried in a shallow grave in Newton Heath, North Manchester. She had been stabbed. Wanda Skala, 17, was murdered in July 1975 on Lightbowne Road, Moston. She was hit over the head with a paving stone and sexually assaulted. Sharon Mosoph, 17, was murdered in March 1976, and dumped in the Rochdale Canal at Failsworth, Oldham. She had been strangled and mutilated after walking by when Hardy was attempting to burgle a shopping centre at night. He was suspected of committing other murders. At the height of the hunt for the serial killer, 23,000 people were stopped and searched. The case has not been as widely reported in the media as the majority of comparable cases of multiple murder. Trevor Hardy was arrested for the murders of Wanda Skala and Sharon Mosoph during 1976. In August 1976 he confessed to both murders and also to that of Janet Lesley Stewart—who until then had been a missing person. Despite the alibis provided by his girlfriend Sheilagh Farrow, Hardy was found guilty of the murders and sentenced to life imprisonment in May 1978. He remained in prison until his death 36 years later, by which time he was one of the longest serving prisoners in Britain.
Robert John Maudsley	1977		Robert John Maudsley (born June 1953) killed four people. He committed three of these murders in prison after receiving a life sentence for a single murder in the mid-1970s. He was alleged to have eaten part of the brain of one of three men he killed in prison, which earned him the nickname "Hannibal the Cannibal" among the British press. He committed his first murder by strangling labourer John Farrell after Farrell allegedly showed him pictures of children he abused, and was declared not fit to stand trial and sent to Broadmoor in 1975. In 1977 he and another prisoner—David Cheeseman—took fellow patient David Francis hostage and tortured him to death and as a result was convicted of manslaughter and sent to Wakefield prison. At Wakefield in July 1978 he killed two fellow prisoners, luring Salney Darwood into his cell and slitting his throat; later that afternoon, he stabbed Bill Roberts and then beat him to death against a wall. Maudsley was convicted of double murder at his trial in 1979. He has served much of his sentence in solitary confinement to prevent him from attacking or killing any more inmates, some of it at Parkhurst prison, but mostly at Wakefield prison in a cell said to resemble Hannibal Lecter's in the film The Silence of the Lambs with cardboard furniture. He became Britain's longest-serving prisoner after the death of Ian Brady in May 2017.
Archibald Thompson Hall	1978	2002	The Killer Butler or Monster Butler, so named as he committed his murders while working in service to members of the British aristocracy as a butler. Hall, also known as Roy Fontaine, was a Glaswegian thief and confidence trickster with numerous convictions and prison sentences by the time he committed his first murder, of an ex-cellmate, whom he shot and buried after an argument over some jewellery stolen from Hall's employer. Hall moved to London and began serving an elderly ex-MP and his wife, and with accomplice Michael Kitto, he killed and buried them both after late-night plans to rob them were disturbed. They then killed a female acquaintance and dumped her body in a barn after she refused to destroy a fur coat which was potentially incriminating evidence, and lastly Hall murdered his half-brother, a convicted child molester who was asking too many questions, before beginning a journey to Scotland with the intention of again burying the body. Having stopped at a hotel for the night when the weather became too hazardous for driving, Hall and Kitto were caught when the hotelier, concerned that the two suspicious-looking guests might not pay their bill, called the police. They found the body in Hall's car boot, and Hall later showed them the three burial sites. After trials in London and Edinburgh, Hall received four life sentences and Kitto three at their trial in May 1978, with one judge recommending that Hall should never be freed. This recommendation was upheld when the list of confirmed whole-life tariff prisoners was published, and Hall was the oldest prisoner on the list. He publicly requested the right to die in 1995, and did so of a stroke in 2002, while still in prison. At 78, he was one of the oldest prisoners in Britain. Three years earlier, he had published his autobiography.
John Childs	1979		John Childs was convicted of the murder of six people in contract killings which were committed between 1974 and 1978; he implicated two others and they were convicted in 1980, but they were released on appeal in 2003 after his evidence was called into question. He murdered Terence Eve in 1974, Robert Brown in 1975, George Brett and his 10-year-old son Terry Brett later on in 1975, Fred Sherwood in 1978 and Ronald Andrews later on in 1978 and was jailed in December 1979, with the murders being committed by shooting and stabbing. He confessed to a journalist in 1998 of five more murders while in prison, he appealed against his conviction in 2014 and his whole-life sentence in 2016 but was rejected each time on account of his crimes being "exceptionally serious".
Dennis Andrew Nilsen	1983	2018	An ex-Army and ex-police civil servant who claimed to have murdered and dismembered up to 15 young men at his homes in North London, storing the body parts inside and around the residences. Nilsen was arrested in February 1983 after workmen investigating a blocked and odorous drain found human flesh. Nilsen's trial judge originally recommended a 25-year minimum sentence in November 1983, but successive Home Secretaries decided that he should never be released from prison. The November 2002 law lords' ruling meant that Nilsen could have been released from prison as early as 2008; however, this did not transpire and he remained imprisoned until his death. Nilsen was also denied the right to publish his autobiography in addition to music and poetry from prison.
Arthur Hutchinson	1984		A fugitive who in 1983 gatecrashed a wedding reception at a house in Sheffield shortly after the bride and groom had left and stabbed to death the bride's father, mother and brother, before raping her teenage sister at knifepoint. Police quickly labelled him as the killer after identifying a handprint on a champagne bottle and a bitemark in a piece of cheese. He was already on the run from answering a charge of violent rape and had previous convictions for offences of violence, indecent assault and dishonesty. Hutchinson was convicted in 1984 and sentenced to life imprisonment with a recommended minimum term of 18 years in September 1984. However, he remains in prison more than 35 years on, having been issued with a whole-life tariff by the Home Secretary, Leon Brittan. Hutchinson has since appealed against this ruling twice through the High Court, but the court upheld the decision of the Home Secretary on both occasions, meaning he is likely to die in prison. Appeals to the European Court of Human Rights in February 2015 and January 2017 were also unsuccessful, with the court's Grand Chamber ruling that whole-life sentences could still be issued provided they were reviewed within 25 years.
Jeremy Neville Bamber (né Jeremy Paul Marsham)	1986		In October 1986, he was found guilty of shooting dead his adoptive parents, sister and six-year-old twin nephews at the family farmhouse in Essex 14 months earlier, in order to claim a six-figure inheritance while also laying evidence to suggest his sister, a known schizophrenic, had committed the murders before killing herself. His trial judge said that he found the idea of ever seeing Bamber free again "difficult to foresee", and advised that he should serve at least 25 years behind bars before release could even be considered. Before the law lords' ruling in November 2002, Bamber was told by at least one Home Secretary that his life sentence would mean life. He has continued to protest his innocence but all appeals against his convictions have so far been unsuccessful.
Victor Miller	1988		He abducted, sexually assaulted and battered to death a 14-year-old boy from Hagley in Worcestershire in February 1988. He confessed after being arrested for an unrelated crime soon afterwards and led detectives to the body. Police later revealed they believed Miller was responsible for around 30 unsolved sexual assaults. In court later that year, he confessed openly to the killing and asked for the maximum sentence available. The trial judge who sentenced Miller in November 1988 recommended that Miller should serve at least 25 years in prison and could have been considered for parole in 2013. Miller has since asked that the appropriate authorities not consider him for release at any point in the future, and therefore wishes to die in prison. Miller's trial judge had also expressed doubt as to whether it would ever be safe to release him.
John Francis Duffy	1988		The Railway Killer, who attacked numerous women in the south of England, raping all of them and murdering three, before revolutionary psychological profiling helped police to catch him, although they got no nearer the accomplice they knew Duffy worked with. He was initially sentenced to life with a recommended 30-year minimum sentence for two murders and seven rapes which could have seen him paroled in 2018. However, at some stage afterwards, at least one home Secretary ruled that Duffy's life sentence should mean life. After 12 years in prison, Duffy went on a conscience-clearing exercise, admitting to a third killing of which he had been originally acquitted, and implicating schoolfriend David Mulcahy as his accomplice. He also revealed his part in countless other rapes, for which he received a further 12 years. After Duffy gave evidence against him, Mulcahy was jailed for life for three murders and seven rapes in 2001 but is not believed to be among the prisoners who have been issued with a whole-life tariff.
Victor Farrant	1988	2024	Victor Farrant was convicted of one count of murder and one count of attempted murder in 1998 and was told by the judge he was never to be released from prison. He also had convictions for rape in 1988 and committed his latest crimes a few weeks later after he was released. He was being considered for early release on compassionate grounds in 2024, but died in prison.
Anthony Arkwright	1989		Arkwright was arrested after he hacked and battered to death three people, including his elderly grandfather, a two-day killing spree in South Yorkshire during August 1988 when aged 21, which means he is likely to be the youngest offender to have been issued with a whole-life tariff by any of the appropriate authorities. He was convicted of all three murders and sentenced to life imprisonment the following year. He was also suspected of a fourth murder committed around the same time but never charged.
Mark Robinson	1989		Mark Robinson killed Patricia Anne Wagner at the age of 17 after she threatened to tell his mother about the affair the two were having, to which Robinson responded by strangling her. When he was released in 1989, he met Sharon Morley in Wakefield, with the two moving to Billingham shortly after; however, Sharon wanted to move back to Wakefield which caused arguments. On 19 September 1989 he discovered a photo of her former boyfriend and in the argument that followed, he beat and stabbed her to death. He was sentenced to life imprisonment at his trial and was later issued with a whole-life tariff.
Victor Castigador	1990	2017	A Filipino illegal immigrant who led a gang of robbers on a grudge attack at a London amusement arcade where he himself worked. Four members of staff were tied up, locked in a cage within the vault before being doused in white spirit and set alight. Two died, two suffered serious burns. Castigador received an initial 25-year tariff from his trial judge which was duly extended to a whole-life tariff, but the November 2002 law lords' ruling means that he could have been released from prison as early as 2015 (by which time he would have been 61 years old) if the parole board decided he was no longer a danger to the public; however, Castigador was charged with murder on 20 June 2016 after murdering a fellow inmate. He admitted the murder and was sentenced to another whole-life tariff in October. He died in Woodhill prison in March 2017. One of his teenage accomplices was sentenced to life with a recommended minimum of 20 years; a subsequent appeal against this recommendation at the High Court was rejected.
Malcolm Green	1991		Malcolm Green was jailed for life in 1971 for the brutal murder of a Cardiff women. He spent 18 years in prison before being released on parole in 1989. Soon afterwards, he bludgeoned to death a young tourist from New Zealand. Green dismembered the body, wrapped it in plastic bags, and dumped it in different places along a road in South Wales. He was sentenced to life again in October 1991, with a recommendation that he should serve a minimum of 25 years, but was given a whole-life tariff by the Home Secretary.
Colin Ireland	1993	2012	The Gay Slayer, who set about achieving a New Year's resolution to become a serial killer by targeting patrons of a public house frequented by gay men. Ireland pretended to be homosexual in order to be taken to each of his victims' homes, where he took advantage of their desire for S&M activity to truss, torture and murder them, often then robbing them to cover his travelling expenses as he was unemployed. He was able to continue as police found initial difficulty in linking the killings to one perpetrator. Ireland was caught when he visited police to try and explain his sighting on closed-circuit television with his final victim; however, his fingerprint was subsequently matched to one found at the man's flat. He confessed to the other murders while in custody and pleaded guilty to all charges in court. His original recommended tariff was never publicised. Ireland remained in prison for nearly 20 years until his death on 21 February 2012 at the age of 57.
Colin Hatch	1994	2011	A paedophile who was convicted of sexual assault on boys in 1991 and 1992 but jailed for only three years after it was decided he was not dangerous enough to be held involuntarily in a Secure Hospital, against the advice of the psychiatrist. He was paroled early and committed the sexually motivated murder of seven-year-old Sean Williams in summer 1993, for which he received a whole-life tariff; Judge Lowry said it was "not possible to envisage" a time when Hatch could be released safely, so "life should mean life". He remained imprisoned until his death in February 2011; he was found dead in his cell and it was reported that he had been murdered by another prisoner. His killer was convicted robber Damien Fowkes, who also wounded another child killer, Ian Huntley—whose crime was far more widely reported, but who did not receive a whole-life sentence.
Rosemary Pauline West	1995		Convicted in November 1995 of the murder of ten women and girls at her home in Gloucester, including one of her daughters and her stepdaughter, between 1971 and 1987. Her husband, Frederick West, committed suicide in jail before he could stand trial for a total of 12 murders (two of which are believed to have occurred just before his association with her). Her trial judge recommended that she should never be released. The Lord Chief Justice later ruled that West should serve a minimum of 25 years, but the new Home Secretary Jack Straw ruled in 1997 that West should never be released. Hindley's death in November 2002 left West as the only confirmed female prisoner on the whole-life tariff register, until the addition of Joanne Dennehy, in 2014. There were news reports as of 2018 of her planning to appeal her whole-life sentence.
Peter Howard Moore	1996		Moore murdered four men in apparently sexually motivated attacks in Wales. He confessed to police but claimed at trial it was a fictional lover, "Jason", who had killed them. Following his conviction the judge said he would urge the Home Secretary to impose the whole-life tariff; it was revealed in 2011 that he remained subject to this after the press reported he was one of three prisoners challenging the legality of the order before the European Court of Human Rights.
Anthony Sawoniuk (né Andrei Sawoniuk)	1999	2005	Belarusian Nazi collaborator who was convicted of murder committed outside the UK against non-British citizens, during the Holocaust, based on the principle of universal jurisdiction. He is the only person sentenced to a whole-life tariff under the 1991 War Crimes Act and was one of the oldest prisoners in Britain when he died aged 84 in Norwich L wing, for elderly men serving life or other long sentences, in 2005. He had been in prison for six years.
Harold Frederick Shipman Jr.	2000	2004	Former general practitioner who was convicted in January 2000 of killing 15 of his patients at his surgery in Hyde, Greater Manchester, in the 1990s, giving them lethal doses of diamorphine. Suspicion was raised in 1998 when the daughter of his last victim found that Shipman had crudely forged her mother's will. Shipman was sentenced to life imprisonment at the end of his trial in January 2000, with the trial judge recommending that he should never be released, and in July 2002 the Home Secretary David Blunkett agreed. An official inquiry shortly afterwards concluded that there was enough evidence to decide that Shipman had killed 215 of his patients, making him Britain's most prolific serial killer, and that he had committed his first murder in 1970 when practising in North Yorkshire. Some reports claimed that he may have committed over 400 murders. Shipman, who never confessed to the murders, hanged himself in his prison cell on 13 January 2004 and the full extent of his crimes will probably be never known as a consequence. Shipman's suicide may have been motivated by the desire to leave his wife with a full NHS pension of a £100,000 lump-sum payment plus £1,200 per month for life, as his wife would only receive this if he died before the age of 60 (he committed suicide a day before his 58th birthday).

== Sentenced by judges ==
Since the European Court of Human Rights decision, only trial judges and the High Court have had the power to impose a whole-life order. In that time, there have been at least 64 instances of trial judges recommending that an offender should never be released.

Several of these prisoners have had their whole-life tariffs reduced on appeal by the High Court.

Name	Year	Died	Notes
Jeremy Thorpe Wing	2002	2026	Wing, who was 61 when sentenced, was found guilty of sexually abusing two children, who were seven when the abuse began. He was also reportedly facing charges over the abuse of a third child. Police raided Wing's home discovering toys, motorised go-karts, water pistols, video games, and footage of Wing and another man, Brian Hogg, abusing children. Both Wing and Hogg, who had met while in prison for previous sexual offences, were convicted of two counts of rape so severe the victims would have physical injuries for life. Judge Andrew Patience was of the opinion that neither Wing nor Hogg would ever be safe to release and sentenced both to life imprisonment with a whole-life order at Maidstone Crown Court, a very rare sentence for a crime other than murder. Hogg's whole life sentence was later overturned on appeal.Wing died in August 2026 at HMP Bure, aged 85.
Paul Glen	2004		Glen was employed as a hitman and in 2004 had been hired to murder Vincent Smart, but instead he murdered Smart's friend Robert Bogle. After his trial, it was revealed that Glen had a previous conviction for murder, having killed hotelier Ivor Usher in February 1989, and served 13 years of his original life sentence before being paroled in 2002, killing again just two years later.
Andrzej Kunowski	2004	2009	A Polish murderer who was imprisoned in England. Kunowski murdered a 12-year-old Macedonian girl, Katerina Koneva, in West London in May 1997, but was not arrested and charged until six years later. Kunowski served just over five years of his life sentence before he died from heart failure in Frankland Prison on 23 September 2009. He was identified by the police as a serial sex offender.
Phillip Peter Heggarty	2004		Convicted of murdering his friend, Derek Bennett, in a hammer attack in 2003. He later set fire to a Renault Laguna after placing Bennett's body in it—his body was so severely burnt that it had to be identified by dental records. The trial judge, Mr Justice Roderick Evans, sitting at the Crown Court in Swansea imposed a whole-life order, which the Court of Appeal later upheld.
Thomas Hamilton McDowell	2004		McDowell murdered and dismembered German trainee rabbi Andreas Hinz, then dumped his head, limbs and torso in bin bags in Camden, North London. McDowell, who suffered abuse as a child and grew up hating homosexuals, admitted manslaughter on grounds of diminished responsibility, but was convicted of murder following a trial at Southwark Crown Court.
Mark Martin	2005		He killed three homeless women in Nottingham between December 2004 and January 2005, declaring his ambition to become "Nottingham's first serial killer". Two of his accomplices were convicted alongside him in 2005 but received 14 and 25-year minimum terms.
Mark Richard Hobson	2005		Murdered his girlfriend Claire Sanderson at their home near Selby in July 2004, before luring her twin sister Diane there and murdering her several days later. He then fled the property and murdered an elderly couple who lived several miles away before going on the run. He was arrested soon after, when he was spotted hiding in bushes near a petrol station in North Yorkshire. Hobson, a binman who had a history of violence, drug addiction and alcoholism, pleaded guilty to all charges in April 2005 and was sentenced to life imprisonment with the judge imposing a whole-life order. Later that year, Hobson applied for a lower tariff to be set on the grounds that he merited some credit for admitting to the crimes at an early opportunity in order to avoid a lengthy trial, but this was rejected by the Lord Chief Justice.
William Horncy	2005		Achieved notoriety in 2005 when he was convicted of murdering millionaire Amarjit Chohan as well as Chohan's wife, mother-in-law and two sons in an effort to take over the Chohan family freight business to ship drugs into the UK. The bodies of Chohan's two sons have not been found.
Kenneth Regan (né Kenneth Avery)	2005		Achieved notoriety in 2005 as he too was involved, with William Horncy, in the murder of millionaire Amarjit Chohan as well as Chohan's wife, mother-in-law and two sons, whose bodies were never found. He was a former drug dealer who became a Police supergrass to gain early release from prison for an earlier offence. He murdered Amarjit Chohan and his family in an effort to take over the Chohan family freight business to ship drugs into the UK.
Paul Culshaw	2005	2013	A murderer and sex offender. In 2005, he was found guilty of murdering Clare Benson-Jowry the previous year. After his trial, it was revealed that Culshaw had previous convictions for crimes including rape, attempted murder and indecent assault. Culshaw was eight years into his life sentence when he was found collapsed in his cell at Frankland Prison on 5 February 2013 and died the following day in aged 45.
Glyn Trevor John Dix	2005	2014	Found guilty of murdering his wife Hazel, having stabbed her to death and chopped her body into 16 pieces at their home in Redditch, Worcestershire in the previous year. It was then revealed that he had already been out of prison on life licence following a previous conviction for murdering a woman during the 1970s. Dix served nine years of his life sentence before his death in prison in 2014 at the age of 60.
Daniel Julian Gonzalez	2006	2007	A drug addict, inspired by horror films, who stabbed four randomly chosen people (including three pensioners) to death over a 24-hour period and tried to kill two more. His mother had previously begged for help from the authorities, rhetorically asking in one letter if her son might "have to commit murder" before anyone would do something about him. He pleaded not guilty by reason of insanity but was found guilty of murder and attempted murder and given six life sentences, with the judge imposing a whole-life order. He committed suicide in a mental hospital just over a year later.
Viktor Dembovskis	2006		A Latvian immigrant who raped and murdered a 17-year-old female neighbour as she walked home from school in West London, before fleeing back to Latvia. Dembovskis was deported from Latvia after a joint operation by British and Latvian police. It was revealed that Dembovskis had a string of convictions in Latvia stretching back to 1980, including two rapes in the 1990s. Given his appalling record, the trial judge imposed a whole-life order—a rare sentence for someone guilty of a single murder.
John McGrady	2006		A convicted rapist who strangled and mutilated 15-year-old neighbour Rochelle Holness in Catford, London, in September 2005 before dumping her dismembered remains in bin bags. He slit his wrists and confessed to his girlfriend after the attack, but his suicide bid was thwarted and he was brought to justice, admitting the murder in court several months later. However, much was made in court of his refusal to co-operate with the police and other authorities, especially on the issue of how or why the teenager was in his flat at the outset, although police remain convinced she did not go willingly. The judge said that McGrady, who had previous convictions for raping and kidnapping women, was a highly dangerous predator and should serve his sentence without the possibility of parole. The victim's family later criticised heavily the nature of the media's distressingly over-descriptive reporting of the murder. McGrady later appealed for a lower minimum term to be set by the Court of Appeal, but this was rejected in January 2007.
Stephen McColl	2006		Underworld figure who worked as an informer for Greater Manchester Police after three other police forces rejected his services. Convicted in August 2006 of two murders. The first victim, Michael Doran, was a member of his gang whom he suspected of being an informer for the Manchester police, despite later becoming an informant himself. The second, Philip Noakes, had publicly humiliated McColl. He was also suspected of the murder of a firefighter in Glasgow, but never convicted of this crime.
Rahan Arshad	2007		Taxi driver who murdered his wife and three children, who were found dead in their home in Cheadle Hulme, Greater Manchester, in August 2006.
Andrew Randall	2007		Murdered his seven-week-old daughter Jessica Randall in Kettering, Northamptonshire, in 2005 after he threw the baby girl headfirst into a settee in their home after abusing her since birth. He told officers he resented her since she was born and he was handed a whole-life tariff as a result at Northampton Crown Court. There were concerns about Jessica's welfare by doctors and staff on the maternity ward, with visits by social services, along with an investigation into her care and death in the weeks before she died. Andrew Randall was blinded completely in one eye from an assault in 2011 by convicted murderer John Jay, who was jailed for 20 years as a result. Randall was attacked in prison again in 2013.
David William Tiley	2007		Two months after he was released from prison for a double rape in the 1990s, he stabbed to death his disabled fiancée Susan Hale, who suffered from a degenerative brain disorder, and then killed her carer Sarah Merritt when she arrived at their home in Southampton in early 2007.
Michael Smith	2007		Murdered 35-year-old Peter Summers in an attack with a bottle in Stoke-on-Trent in August 2006. He was convicted of this murder nine months later. Smith had been previously convicted of murdering his 18-year-old girlfriend Sheila Deakin in 1975 and spent 30 years in prison, only being released on parole 12 months before he went on to murder Peter Summers.
Steven Gerald James Wright	2008		The Suffolk Strangler, who was jailed for life in February 2008 after being found guilty of murdering five women, whose bodies were found in the Ipswich area during December 2006. See also: Ipswich serial murders.
Levi Bellfield	2008		Attacked three young women, killing two and seriously injuring the third in sexually motivated attacks in London and Surrey between February 2003 and August 2004. He was first arrested in November 2004, before being re-arrested and charged in March 2006. After he was convicted of these murders, Surrey Police identified him as the prime suspect in the murder of Walton-on-Thames teenager Milly Dowler, whose body was found in Hampshire in September 2002, six months after she went missing on her way home from school. He was charged with the murder three years later, and in June 2011 was found guilty. The trial judge in this case also sentenced Bellfield to life imprisonment with a whole-life order, making him the first prisoner in England and Wales to date to have received such a sentence on two separate occasions. Bellfield has also been identified as a suspect - but never charged - over other unsolved murders and attacks on women and teenage girls in the South-East since 1990.
Douglas Gary Vinter	2008		Strangled and murdered his wife Anne White in Normanby, Teesside, on 10 February 2008. He admitted the murder in court two months later, and was already on life licence having spent nine years in prison for the murder of Teesside railway worker Carl Edon in August 1995. Vinter applied to the High Court for lesser minimum term to be set, but this appeal was rejected in June 2009. Vinter was among the killers who mounted the successful legal challenge against the whole-life tariff in July 2013, with the Court of Appeal later ruling in February 2014 that such sentences were justified provided that they were reviewed within 25 years of being issued. In February 2016, Vinter was given a third life sentence for the attempted murder of fellow prisoner Lee Newell (also serving a whole-life tariff) at HMP Woodhill, with the judge once again reiterating that he should never be released. In defence, his solicitor argued that the lack of any realistic chance of release from prison had contributed to Vinter's violent behaviour and removed the incentive for him to behave well and co-operate with the prison regime. In November 2012, Vinter had also admitted wounding child killer Roy Whiting in prison.
Simon Wilson	2008		Was sentenced to a whole-life sentence in 2008 after admitting grievous bodily harm, sexual assault and attempted rape after attacking his 71-year-old victim. Was deported back to Britain from Australia where he lived for most of his life, for committing murder and rape, after serving 16 years.
Marc Chivers	2009		Strangled his ex-girlfriend Maria Stubbings with a dog lead in December 2008. He pleaded guilty to the crime in court 12 months later and was jailed for life. He had previously served 15 years in prison in Germany for murdering another ex-girlfriend and was deported to the UK in January 2008. Chivers had a string of previous convictions for some extreme cases of violent behaviour.
Peter Britton Tobin	2009	2022	Convicted in 2009 of the murder of Dinah McNicol in Margate, Kent, in 1991. Tobin had already been convicted in Scotland for the murder that same year of Vicky Hamilton, whose body was found in Tobin's back garden alongside that of McNicol, and also for the murder of Angelika Kluk in a Glasgow church in 2006. Tobin was already serving two concurrent prison sentences in Scotland (which does not have the whole-life tariff) of 21 years and 30 years for the murders of Angelika Kluk and Vicky Hamilton, respectively, but in December 2009 he was found guilty of Dinah McNicol's murder and sentenced to life imprisonment—this time with a whole-life order. He died in Edinburgh Royal Infirmary on 8 October 2022.
Royston Jackson	2010	2019	Convicted of the murder of convicted sex offender Gordon Boon in October 2008, after being released on licence two years earlier following his conviction for another murder he had committed in 1989. He died from cancer at HMP Whitemoor in March 2019.
Peter William Sutcliffe	2010	2020	The Yorkshire Ripper, who murdered 13 women and attacked seven others between 1975 and 1980 in West Yorkshire and Greater Manchester. He was caught by chance while sitting in his car with a sex worker and potential victim in Sheffield in January 1981, and made a full confession to each attack to the police, even though they had only arrested him for having false number plates. At his trial later in 1981 he pleaded guilty to manslaughter but was convicted of 13 murders and was jailed for life. He was initially held in a mainstream prison before being transferred to Broadmoor Hospital. He was returned to a mainstream prison in 2016, and died aged 74 from complications of diabetes in University Hospital of North Durham on 13 November 2020, after serving almost 40 years of his life sentence. Sutcliffe's trial judge recommended that he should serve at least 30 years in prison before being considered for parole, meaning that he could have been given parole as early as 2011, nine years before his death. It was frequently reported in the media that he was among the prisoners to have been issued with a whole-life tariff, but he was not on a list of 35 such prisoners which was published in December 2006. A whole-life tariff was imposed by the High Court on 16 July 2010.
Ernest Leslie Wright	2010	2020	Convicted of the execution-style murder of Neville Corby (aged 42) with a shotgun and the simultaneous attempted murder of Corby's partner. Had been previously convicted of murder in 1971 and served 26 years. Died from heart failure and pneumonia on 4 September 2020 following a fall in HMP Wakefield.
Anthony John Hardy	2010	2020	Killing of three women to "satisfy depraved and perverted needs". Police believe he was involved in six other murders of women but these cases have not been brought to court.
John Nigel Maden	2010		Drugged, raped and killed his 12-year-old niece Tia Rigg at his Manchester home after luring her there on the pretext of babysitting. He then phoned police and told them that he had murdered her "because he felt like it". He had previously developed an obsession with violent pornography and images of extreme child abuse.
Desmond Lee	2010		Convicted in 2010 of murdering his lover Christopher Pratt by breaking his voice box and a bone in his neck in his flat in Ravensthorpe, then using his credit cards to go on a shopping spree before dumping his body. Served 14 years of a life sentence from 1990 to 2004 after murdering his landlady Shirley Carr after she taunted him over the breakdown of his relationship.
Wilbert Anthony Dyce	2010		Convicted in 2010 of a 1982 triple murder in which a mother and her two young daughters were killed. The murder was initially treated as racially motivated, as racist slogans had been spray-painted over the walls of the family's home, but Dyce was eventually linked to the crimes by advances in DNA technology, and it was established that the hallmarks of a racially motivated attack had been part of a plot by Dyce (who was also Afro-Caribbean) to try to avoid capture.
Stephen Shaun Griffiths	2010		Convicted of murdering three women in Bradford, one murder involving the use of a crossbow. He dismembered his victims before dumping the remains in the River Aire. Griffiths also claimed to have cannibalised his victims, though this has never been definitively proven.
John Sweeney	2011	2026	Convicted of murdering two women whose bodies were found mutilated and dumped in canals in London and the Netherlands. Sweeney died at HMP Whitemoor in August 2026.
George Norman Johnson	2011		Convicted in 2011 of the premeditated murder of 89-year-old Florence Habesch in February that year to fund his drug addiction. Wolverhampton-born Johnson had already served 20 years of a life sentence imposed in 1986 for the murder of a man in a burglary at his house.
John William Cooper	2011		Convicted in 2011 of two double murders in Pembrokeshire, Wales, the first in 1985 and the second in 1989.
David Baxendale	2011		Convicted in March 2011 of the murder by repeated stabbing of a woman in Nutfield, Surrey, in June 2010. Baxendale had a history of violence stretching back some 20 years. In 2001 he was convicted of murder in Spain, where he had repeatedly stabbed his victim and for which he was sentenced to 11 years in prison. He served seven years of his sentence before being deported back to Britain.
Andrew Dawson	2011		Convicted of the murder of John David Matthews and Paul Hancock in July 2010. He was out on licence from a previous murder conviction committed in the 1980s.
David Cook	2012	2020	Convicted in 1988 of strangling a young woman to death, Cook was released in 2009. Cook strangled a second victim when on parole, and the second judge gave him a whole-life tariff. He died on 24 December 2020.
David Robert Oakes	2012	2013	Convicted and sentenced to a whole-life term for the double murder, using a double-barrelled shotgun, of his ex-girlfriend Christine Chambers and their two-year-old daughter following the breakdown of their relationship and just hours before a custody hearing to agree access rights to their daughter. Christine had been assaulted over a period of several hours before being shot. Oakes was said to be jealous and frustrated over the ending of the relationship and did not want another father figure in his daughter's life. Oakes died in hospital of natural causes less than a year into his life sentence.
Stephen Farrow	2012	2023	Farrow, a vagrant with a history of psychiatric illness, was convicted of the murders of Betty Yates (aged 77) and John Suddards (aged 59). Mr Justice Field, sentencing, said: "The sentence for murder is a mandatory life sentence and in respect of each count I pass a life sentence. I next have to consider whether you should be made the subject of a whole-life sentence or whether a minimum term should be set. I am satisfied that in your case a whole-life sentence is an appropriate sentence in each of these dreadful, horrific killings." Farrow died at HMP Frankland, 11 years into his sentence, on 21 August 2023.
Mark Leonard Bridger	2013		Bridger was found guilty of abducting and murdering five-year-old April Jones, who was last seen alive on 1 October 2012, in Machynlleth, Wales. He claimed to have accidentally run her over while driving and that he could not remember where he had hidden her body due to being intoxicated. On 30 May 2013, he was found guilty of abduction, murder and perverting the course of justice and was sentenced to life imprisonment with a recommendation that he should never be released. Although April Jones's body has never been found, police linked her DNA profile to bone fragments and blood found in Bridger's house and concluded that she had suffered unsurvivable injuries, and were able to press murder charges within a week of her disappearance despite having not found her body, which they believe may have been dismembered. Bridger later planned to appeal against his sentence, but dropped his appeal bid in January 2014 just before it was due to be heard.
Dale Christopher Cregan	2013		Cregan murdered Police Constables Nicola Hughes and Fiona Bone, two Greater Manchester Police officers, in a gun and grenade attack on 18 September 2012. He also pleaded guilty to two separate killings of two members of the same family earlier in 2012, as part of a gangland feud in Manchester. Cregan received a whole-life prison term on 13 June 2013.
Gary David Smith	2013		Smith, along with accomplice Lee Newell, murdered convicted child killer Subhan Anwar in his cell at HMP Long Lartin on 14 February 2013 by strangling him with tracksuit trousers. Smith was already serving a life sentence for a previous murder committed in 1998. He received a whole-life sentence on 23 September 2013.
Lee William Newell	2013		Convicted alongside Gary Smith for the February 2013 murder of convicted child killer Subhan Anwar in his cell at HMP Long Lartin. Newell was already serving a life sentence for a previous murder committed in 1988 and received a whole-life sentence on 23 September 2013. On 19 June 2026 he received a second whole-life sentence after being convicted along with Mark Fellows and David Taylor of the murder of Kyle Bevan in HMP Wakefield in 2025.
Jamie Reynolds	2013		Pleaded guilty to murdering 17-year-old Georgia Williams after luring her to his home in Wellington, Shropshire, in May 2013. He then dumped her body near Wrexham, North Wales, where it was found just after his arrest in Glasgow several days later. In 2008 Reynolds tried to strangle a girl, but this merely resulted in a final warning when police investigated. In 2011, Reynolds drove his car into that of a girl who had rejected his advances, but police did not connect this with the 2008 incident. The Justice Liaison Service and police were told about violent pornography Reynolds had viewed, as well as images he had created of young women and teenage girls he personally knew. This was also not taken sufficiently seriously and the girls were not warned. Several agencies were involved with Reynolds but there was no co-ordinated approach to managing or monitoring him, and consequently few people who knew him were aware of these incidents. In the aftermath of his conviction for the murder of Georgia Williams, media sources stated that the murder could have been prevented if police and social services had acted on information they had received about Reynolds, which would have led to him being monitored and potentially registered as a sex offender when at liberty, even if he had not been jailed for these offences. Reynolds, 23 when he went on trial began and still 22 when he committed the murder, confessed to the murder on 2 December 2013. Sentencing was delayed until 19 December, when the judge sentenced him to life imprisonment and recommended that he should never be released, after reading reports from psychiatrists stating that Reynolds had the potential to progress into a serial killer had he not apprehended and was likely to remain a danger to women for the rest of his life. The court also heard of pornographic material found on his computer, including 72 graphic videos and more than 16,000 graphic images. A murderer at the age of 22 and sentenced to life at 23, Reynolds is one of the youngest people in British history to be handed a whole-life tariff. In April 2014 it was reported that he would be appealing for a reduction in his sentence, despite his solicitor announcing shortly after the trial that Reynolds was resigned to spending the rest of his life in prison and would not be challenging his sentence. His appeal was rejected on 31 October 2014. Since he was remanded in custody during 2013, Reynolds has been held at Ashworth Hospital on Merseyside. In September 2016, the Welsh media reported that Reynolds was lodging a fresh appeal to the European Court of Human Rights which was likely to be heard during 2017. A decade on, however, his case has still not been heard.
Anwar Daniel Rosser	2014		"Psychotic, bullying alcoholic" 33-year-old Anwar Rosser, a former soldier, murdered sleeping four-year-old Riley Turner in a "savage and sadistic" attack on 20 January 2013 while Rosser was staying at the Turner family home. The motive for the killing remains unknown. He admitted the murder in court a year later and was sentenced to life in prison. His appeal against his sentence in October 2014 was rejected.
Ian John McLoughlin	2014		Ian McLoughlin committed his first killing in 1984, when he bludgeoned 49-year-old Len Delgatty with a hammer before strangling him. The jury chose to convict him of manslaughter (rather than murder) on 19 September 1984, and he was sentenced to 10 years imprisonment. On 27 June 1985, this was reduced to eight years on appeal. In September 1990, just over a year after being let out of prison for killing Len Delgatty, he murdered Peter Halls in Brighton, and was sentenced to life at Lewes Crown Court in July 1992, with the Lord Chief Justice recommending a minimum term of 14 years. 21 years later, on 13 July 2013, he was released on temporary licence, and on that day, during the course of a robbery murdered Graham Buck, an innocent man investigating his neighbour's cries for help. McLoughlin was convicted of robbery and murder, and was initially sentenced to life with a minimum term of 40 years, and eight years concurrent for the robbery. His trial judge believed that he no longer had the power to recommend that a life sentence could mean life, following the European Court of Human Rights ruling two months earlier. However, McLoughlin was already 55 years old and this meant that he would not be considered for parole unless he lived to be at least 95. Following a ruling by British judges in February 2014 that whole-life tariffs were lawful, McLoughlin's 40-year sentence was quashed, and a whole-life order was applied to him.
Michael Olumide Adebolajo	2014		On the afternoon of 22 May 2013, a British Army soldier, Drummer Lee Rigby of the Royal Regiment of Fusiliers, was attacked and killed by Michael Adebolajo and Michael Adebowale near the Royal Artillery Barracks in Woolwich, south-east London. Both men were Muslim converts. Twenty-nine-year-old Adebolajo was found guilty of Rigby's murder on 19 December 2013, as was Adebowale, but their sentencing was delayed due to the pending outcome of the High Court's decision on life sentences following the European Court of Human Rights ruling in July that year. On 26 February 2014, after the High Court ruled that whole-life sentences were still lawful provided they were reviewed after 25 years, Adebolajo was sentenced at the Central Criminal Court, to a whole-life term. Adebowale avoided a whole-life sentence but instead received a 45-year minimum term and is unlikely to be released until at least 2058, when he will be 67.
Joanna Christine Dennehy	2014		Described by the judge as a "cruel, calculating, selfish and manipulative serial killer". Convicted of murdering three men in seemingly random attacks which were committed in March 2013. She confessed to all three murders at the Old Bailey on 18 November 2013. Due to the pending High Court ruling on the legality of whole-life sentences, sentencing was delayed until 28 February 2014, when she was jailed for life with a whole-life tariff, making her one of only four women who have ever been handed a whole-life sentence and the first woman ever to be given this sentence by a judge. Three men were found guilty of taking part in the crimes but all three received lesser sentences.
Paul O'Hara	2014		Described by police as "a predatory, violent individual", O'Hara was sentenced to a whole-life term on 30 June 2014 after admitting murdering his girlfriend Cherylee Shennan. On 17 March 2014, Shennan was in her own home giving evidence to two police officers about domestic abuse suffered at O'Hara's hands when he burst in, attacked the two officers with a hammer and chased Shennan into the street where he then fatally stabbed her. O'Hara had been previously sentenced to life in 1998 for murdering girlfriend Janine Waterworth in "very similar circumstances", and had only been released on licence in 2013.
Ryan Matthews (AKA Stephen Cecil King)	2015		62-year-old convicted murderer Matthews was sentenced to a whole-life term on 9 January 2015, after pleading guilty to the murder of healthcare assistant Sharon Wall at Wotton Hill Hospital in Gloucester on 9 July 2014. Matthews left Broadmoor Secure Hospital in 1999 under the Mental Health Act and his mental health had "deteriorated" throughout stays in various hospitals following his release. Matthews had originally been jailed for life after being convicted in 1983 (under the name Stephen Cecil King) of two other murders and a count of conspiracy to murder.
David Mitchell	2015		On 11 December 2013, 47-year-old David Mitchell killed his homosexual lover, convicted sex offender Robert Hind, in a drunken rage. The body was dismembered and dumped in several refuse bags in or by a canal a short distance from his home. Mitchell had previously served 23 years of a life sentence for the murder of his girlfriend in 1990 and was released only four months before the murder.
Jason Gomez	2015		On 25 March 2015, 45-year-old Jason Gomez and 33-year-old Paul Wadkin lured a fellow prisoner 46-year-old Darren Flynn into a cell at HMP Swaleside and then stabbed him over 190 times with a thin black handle and a knife wrapped in material. Jason Gomez was already serving life for a previous murder committed in 2001 when he stabbed his business partner Robert Jones to death and while he admitted his part in Flynn's murder before the trial got started, the judge still gave him a whole-life sentence. In July 2016, Gomez had an appeal against the sentence rejected.
Ian Birley	2015		On 13 July 2015, 43-year-old Ian Birley and his girlfriend, 39-year-old Helen Nichols, followed 65-year-old John Gogarty to his home in Wombwell, near Barnsley, South Yorkshire, before demanding his PIN and stabbing him 69 times. This was the second murder for which Birley had been convicted. In 1996, Birley had been convicted of the murder of 69-year-old Maurice Hoyle in his house in Barnsley and served 18 years of a life sentence before being released on licence. As a result of having already been convicted of one murder, Birley was given a whole-life tariff for the murder of Mr Gogarty. His partner, Helen Nichols, was told she must serve a minimum of 20 years for her part in the murder.
Russell Anthony Oliver	2016		On 31 May 2015, previously convicted murderer Russell Anthony Oliver, 46, attacked John York in his cell at high-security HMP Long Lartin. York, who was jailed for life in 2013 for beating a man to death, died from head injuries. Mr Justice Haddon-Cave handed Oliver a whole-life sentence at Birmingham Crown Court on Thursday 24 March 2016. Co-accused Stephen Boorman, 31, from Irthlingborough, Northamptonshire, was cleared of killing York.
Anthony Ayres	2016		On 19 November 2015, Anthony Ayres murdered 36-year-old mother-of-one Kelly Pearce at a friend's flat in Canvey, Essex, by stabbing her 40 times and then beating her to death. Ayres had a previous murder conviction dating back to 1994 for murdering his then-girlfriend Dawn Wisdom in 1993, and had been released on licence in May 2012. On 26 July 2016 he was handed a whole-life sentence at Chelmsford Crown Court by Judge Maura McGowan QC.
Christopher Halliwell	2016		On 19 October 2012, Christopher Halliwell pleaded guilty to the murder of Sian O'Callaghan who he picked up outside a nightclub in Swindon in March 2011 before stabbing her to death. He was sentenced to life imprisonment with a minimum term of 25 years. While under arrest in connection with O'Callaghan's disappearance, Halliwell confessed to killing another woman several years earlier, 20-year-old Becky Godden, who went missing in Swindon in 2003. He led police to both her and O'Callaghan's remains, but the High Court later ruled this was inadmissible as evidence as the investigating officer, Detective Superintendent Steve Fulcher, had breached the guidelines of the Police and Criminal Evidence Act 1984 by failing to caution Halliwell and denying him access to a solicitor during the period that the confession was obtained. As there was no other evidence linking him to Godden's murder other than his confession, police were unable to try him and the charge had to be dropped. Four years later, Halliwell was tried for Godden's murder after Wiltshire Police uncovered new evidence in the case. On 19 September 2016, a jury convicted him of Godden's murder and, on 23 September, he was given a whole-life sentence with the judge describing him as a "calculating and devious" individual. Police are also investigating the possibility he may have killed more women.
Arthur Simpson-Kent	2016		Murdered his partner, former EastEnders actress Sian Blake, 43, and their two sons Zachary, aged eight, and Amon, four, by beating and stabbing them at their home in Erith, London, in December 2015. Police believe he committed the murders because she was planning to leave him. He buried their bodies in the garden and later fled to Ghana in an attempt to evade justice, but was caught and returned to the UK. On 5 October 2016, he was given a whole-life sentence after he pleaded guilty to the murders.
Thomas Alexander Mair	2016		Murdered Jo Cox, Labour MP, in Birstall, West Yorkshire on 16 June 2016. Mair had researched and laid out an assassination plan. Because of the severity of the offence, including the political motivation (the trial judge said that he had no doubt that the murder was committed for the purpose of advancing a political, racial and ideological cause, namely that of violent white supremacism and exclusive nationalism most associated with Nazism), the judge imposed a whole-life tariff.
Stephen John Port	2016		Murdered Gabriel Kovari, 22, from Lewisham, Daniel Whitworth, 21, from Gravesend, Kent, Anthony Walgate, 23, from Dagenham, east London, and Jack Taylor, 25, also from Dagenham, between August 2014 and September 2015. Port, a former chef, met his victims on dating websites, including Grindr, and coaxed them to his home in Barking for sex before giving them fatal doses of drugs. Their bodies were all found dumped in or near a graveyard within 500m of his house. The Metropolitan Police admitted it missed "potential opportunities" in investigating the deaths. At his trial, the Judge accepted that Port's intention was only to cause really serious harm and not death, but made the point that Port must have foreseen that there was a high risk of death, especially after the death of his first victim. This was sufficient for him to be convicted of murder in English law. The Judge said that he had carried out the murders to "satisfy his lust for sex with young men who were rendered unconscious" and gave him a whole-life term.
Leroy Campbell	2017		Raped and murdered nurse Lisa Skidmore by strangling with a ligature in Bilston and attempted to murder her mother by strangling with a vacuum cord, who came to visit her daughter at her home. He tried to cover his tracks by setting fire to Lisa's room and leaving items with other peoples DNA on them. He had been released four months earlier after serving 17 years on a life sentence for raping a woman in her home she shared with her son, while having previous convictions for crimes including aggravated burglary and indecent assault. He was handed a whole-life sentence after pleading guilty to murder, attempted murder, rape and arson with intent by judge Mr Justice Wall at Birmingham Crown Court.
Billy White	2017		Murdered his girlfriend Lucy Ayris in 2015 and sentenced to life with a minimum term of 15 years by Judge Gerald Gordon at the Old Bailey on 11 May 2016. White later murdered fellow prisoner Brett Rogers (himself a convicted murderer) whilst a prisoner at HMP Long Lartin in Worcestershire. Judge Robert Juckes QC gave White term a whole-life order for this later murder on 25 September 2017 at Worcester Crown Court.
John Wass	2017		John Wass, 69 was convicted of 17 counts of historical child abuse which included rape, sexual assault and sexual exposure against 3 different victims going back to the 1960s. Was handed a whole-life tariff at Derby Crown Court on 1 August 2017 after a 3-week trial. Wass is currently the only serving whole-life prisoner who has never been convicted of murder.
Alan Maidment	2017		Murdered Thomas Jones, who he believed had assaulted his girlfriend by stabbing him 32 times in Swinton before placing items on top of the body and setting it on fire. He then watched the blaze on a bench across the road while firefighters tackled the blaze before being arrested. It was only nine months after he was released on licence from a previous murder conviction on 21 March 2017. He was sentenced to a whole-life order at his trial on 10 October 2017, along with a six-year sentence for a series of robberies and a two-year sentence for possessing a knife.
William John McFall	2018		Convicted of the murder of Quyen Ngoc Nguyen alongside his accomplice Stephen Unwin, although he was cleared on the rape charge. William McFall, 51 was previously convicted of murder of a pensioner in Northern Ireland in May 1996 and was released on licence in 2010. Was sentenced at Newcastle Crown court alongside his accomplice by Mr Justice Morris in April 2018 to a whole-life order.
Stephen Unwin	2018		Convicted of the murder and rape of Quyen Ngoc Nguyen. He trapped her before subjecting her to sexual and physical assault before driving her to a remote location and setting her on fire. He then drove to a cash machine and withdrew money from her bank account while she burned. Stephen Unwin, 40 had previously been convicted of murdering a pensioner and setting a fire to cover his tracks in 1998 but was paroled in 2012 after serving 14 years. He was sentenced at Newcastle Crown court alongside his accomplice by Mr Justice Morris in April 2018 to a whole-life order.
John Taylor	2018		He was given a second life sentence after admitting 16 sexual offences spanning from 1977 to 1987, a host of crimes including rape, buggery, grievous bodily harm and several other offences. Was originally jailed for life in June 2002 for the murder of Leanne Tiernan and told to expect to spend the rest of his life in prison, although four years later the High Court imposed a minimum sentence of 30 years on Taylor.
Mark Fellows	2019		After a 26-day trial, Mark Fellows, 38, was found guilty of murdering Paul Massey, 55, shot outside his home in 2015 as part of an ongoing feud between rival gangs the A Team and the 'Anti' or 'AA Team'. Fellows was also found guilty of shooting dead John Kinsella, a friend of Massey from Liverpool, three years later. The appeal against his sentence was rejected in June 2019. On 19 June 2026, Fellows was sentenced to a second full life term after being convicted of murder along with two other prisoners after child-killer Kyle Bevan was killed at HM Prison Wakefield.
Khairi Saadallah	2021		Khairi Saadallah was sentenced to a whole-life order in January 2021 for murdering three people during the 2020 Reading stabbings. Saadallah murdered James Furlong, 36, David Wails, 49 and Joe Ritchie-Bennett, 39 on 20 June 2020 in Forbury Gardens, a public park located in Reading, Berkshire, UK. The presiding judge Mr Justice Sweeney said: "During the course of the attack and afterwards and because he was seeking to advance a political, religious or ideological cause, the defendant was shouting in Arabic, 'God is the greatest' and 'God accept my jihad'."
Wayne Couzens	2021		Wayne Couzens was sentenced to a whole-life order on 30 September 2021 for the kidnap, rape and murder of 33-year-old Sarah Everard, on 4 March 2021. Couzens, a serving Metropolitan Police officer, falsely arrested Everard in London and proceeded to kidnap and transport her to Dover in Kent. Subsequently, Couzens raped Everard, before strangling her with his police duty belt. He then burned her body before discarding it in a pond. Lord Justice Fulford, sitting as a trial judge, said the murder was "devastating, tragic, and wholly brutal". Couzens appealed against his sentence, but his appeal was rejected.
David Fuller	2021		David Fuller was sentenced to life imprisonment with a whole-life order on 15 December 2021 for the murders of Wendy Knell, 25, and Caroline Pearce, 20, in Royal Tunbridge Wells in 1987, to run concurrently with a sixteen-year sentence for the sexual abuse of more than 100 female corpses in two hospital mortuaries in Kent, over a period of 12 years, while serving as a hospital electrician. The presiding judge, Mrs Justice Cheema-Grubb, said that Fuller "had no regard for the dignity of the dead".
Anthony Russell	2022		Triple murderer who raped a pregnant woman before strangling her, as well as murdering a mother and son. He was sentenced to a whole-life order in March 2022. The sentencing judge, Mr Justice Wall, described Russell as "exceptionally dangerous and manipulative".
Ali Harbi Ali	2022		Murdered David Amess, a long-serving Conservative MP, in Leigh-on-Sea on 15 October 2021. Ali, an Islamic State supporter, stabbed Amess more than 20 times while attending a constituency surgery. Amess received treatment at the scene for his injuries, but was later pronounced dead. Ali, who pleaded not guilty but did not dispute much of the evidence against him, had plotted to murder other MPs, seeking revenge against those (including Amess) who had voted for air strikes against Syria. The sentencing judge, Mr Justice Sweeney, imposed a whole-life order for the murder, saying that it "struck at the heart of our democracy".
Hakeem Kigundu	2022		Kigundu, an illegal immigrant from Uganda, set fire to a block of flats in Reading where he lived after being given an eviction notice due to his persistent anti-social behaviour. The fire killed two men: Richard Burgess and Neil Morris, and seriously injured two others.
Damien Bendall	2022		Bendall was sentenced to a whole-life order after admitting the murder of a pregnant woman, her two young children and their school friend at a house in the Derbyshire town of Killamarsh in September 2021. He also confessed to the rape of one of the children prior to the murders.
Louis de Zoysa	2023		Louis De Zoysa shot and killed Metropolitan Police officer Sgt Matt Ratana whilst he was acting in the execution of his duty, after concealing an antique gun in his jacket. De Zoysa fired four shots, hitting Sgt Ratana in the chest and leg, whilst handcuffed at Croydon Custody Suite. It was the first whole-life order handed down whilst TV cameras were allowed in the Crown Court.
Lucy Letby	2023		After a trial which lasted nearly a year, Letby was convicted of murdering seven new-born babies and attempting to murder six others by injecting insulin and air whilst serving as a NHS nurse in the neonatal ward in the Countess of Chester Hospital during 2015 and 2016. Letby, who was not in court to hear her sentence, received a whole-life sentence on each of the 14 counts. This was the first time a whole-life order was handed down to a woman after TV cameras were allowed in the Crown Court to record the sentencing. Letby was handed a 15th whole-life order in 2024 following a retrial. Her legal team are preparing a case for her convictions to be quashed, and the safety of her convictions has been brought under growing doubt by the media.
Lawrence Bierton	2023		Convicted of a third murder whilst out of prison on licence, Bierton was given a whole-life order on 20 December 2023. He had been convicted in 1996 of the murder of two sisters.
Marcus Osborne	2024		Osborne was sentenced to a whole-life order after admitting the murder of his ex-girlfriend Katie Higton and her new partner Steven Harnett in Huddersfield on 15 May 2023. He also confessed to rape of a second woman.
Brian Whitelock	2024		Whitelock was given a whole-life order for the murder of 71-year-old Wendy Buckney. He had already killed two others—Nicky Morgan and Glen Whitelock, the latter being his brother—but was released under licence from his life sentence in 2019. Months after his release he was sent back to prison for assaulting a shop keeper. He was released again on licence in October 2021.
Steven Sansom	2025		Sansom was sentenced to a whole-life order after he had pleaded guilty to the murder of 38-year-old Sarah Mayhew, whom he had murdered at his flat alongside his partner, Gemma Watts. Sansom and Watts had then dismembered Mayhew's body. Sansom had also been convicted of murdering a taxi driver in 1998, when he was 19.
Kyle Clifford	2025		Clifford murdered his ex-girlfriend Louise Hunt, her mother Carol and her sister Hannah at their home on 9 July 2024. He raped Louise and held her captive for two hours before killing her.
Direece Roche	2025		Roche stabbed his great-uncle, 64-year-old Fintan McDwyer, 77 times, claiming that he was acting in self-defence after an attempt to steal McDwyer's dog went wrong, in the early hours of 30 June 2024. Roche had previously been sentenced to life with a minimum of 12 years in prison for the murder of 23-year-old Adam Steele in 2011, after stabbing Steele to death.
Sharaz Ali	2026		Ali, motivated by "revenge and sexual jealousy", murdered 29-year-old Bryonie Gawith and her three children after the end of his relationship with Gawith's sister.
Shaine March	2026		March stabbed his pregnant girlfriend Alana Odysseos to death at her home in Walthamstow in the early hours of 22 July 2024. He had previously served thirteen years in prison for murdering 17-year-old Andre Drummond in 2000 and had a history of convictions for violent offences. Initially sentenced to a minimum of 42 years in prison, which would keep him in prison until at least the age of 89, March's sentence was increased to a whole life order by the Court of Appeal following a referral by the Attorney General's Office.
Jamie Varley	2026		Varley was convicted of the murder of his adoptive son Preston Davey, aged 13 months, following a campaign of sexual, physical and psychological abuse. Varley's former partner, John McGowan-Fazackerley, was also sentenced to 25 years' imprisonment for charges including allowing the death of a child and sexual assault.
David Taylor	2026		Taylor was convicted along with Lee Newell and Mark Fellows of the murder of child murderer Kyle Bevan in HMP Wakefield in 2025. Taylor had previously been convicted of the murder of 24-year-old Alisha Apostoloff-Boyarin in 2022 along with the attempted murder of a police detective during an interview at HMP Frankland in 2024.
James Desborough	2026		Desborough was convicted of murdering 57-year-old Claudio Aquilino and 43-year-old Daniel Coleman, who were both homeless and considered vulnerable. After killing his victims, Desborough dismembered their bodies, before attempting to burn their remains and ultimately hiding them in woodland in Cornwall. While on remand for these murders at HMP Exeter, Desborough murdered his cellmate, Steven Kempster, because he was irritated with Kempster's snoring.
Simon Levy	2026		Levy was given whole-life sentences for the murders of Carmenza Valencia-Trujillo in March 2025, and Sheryl Wilkins in August 2025, as well as two concurrent life sentences for rape. Levy was a registered sex offender with an extensive history of assaulting women. At the time of the second murder he had been investigated and released without charge for the first murder, and was on bail for a separate series of sexual assaults.

== Quashed whole-life orders ==
- Harry Roberts was one of the perpetrators of the Shepherd's Bush murders in 1966, in the course of which three police officers were shot dead during a traffic stop on Braybrook Street. Roberts had personally shot two of the three victims, Christopher Head and David Wombwell. At his trial in December 1966, Mr Justice Glyn-Jones sentenced Roberts to a minimum of 30 years in prison with a recommendation that he never be released. He was repeatedly told while in prison that he would never be released, and Home Secretary David Blunkett repeatedly blocked efforts to secure Roberts' release or transfer to an open prison. Roberts was eventually granted parole in 2014, after spending 48 years in prison.
- Patrick Magee, who bombed the Grand Hotel in Brighton in October 1984, killing five people and nearly killing his intended target Prime Minister Margaret Thatcher and her Cabinet. He was convicted in 1985 of five counts of murder and several explosive and terrorism offences, with a recommendation that he serve 35 years in prison, which was increased later to whole-life by Michael Howard. He was released after 14 years in 1999 as part of the Good Friday Agreement.
- Joe O'Connell, Eddie Butler, Hugh Doherty and Harry Duggan were members of an IRA active service unit called the Balcombe Street Gang, that terrorised London in the mid-1970s, killing six people, injuring many others and planning more attacks which were later foiled or never carried out. They were caught after they took a couple hostage in their flat in Marylebone while attempting to escape police pursuit and surrendered after six days. They were later each given whole-life tariffs by the Home Secretary; however, they were released as part of the Good Friday Agreement. During their trial they admitted to the Woolwich pub bombing and Guildford pub bombing, which others were convicted of and served time for.
- Harry Mackenney was convicted of four counts of murder in 1980 alongside his co-defendant Terry Pinfold who was convicted of procuring Harry Mackenney to murder business associate Terrence Eve after murderer John Childs turned evidence against the two. He was cleared in 2003 along with Terry Pinfold after spending over 20 years in prison when the court of appeal accepted that John Childs was a compulsive liar. He was originally sentenced to life with a recommended minimum term of 25 years by Justice Anthony May, but was told in 1996 by the home secretary that he would never be released.
- Ronald William Barton was convicted of murdering his 14-year-old stepdaughter Keighley Barton in October 1986, in what was believed as an attempt on Barton's part to stop Keighley from testifying against him for child abuse and to gain revenge against her mother. He had several previous convictions for gross indecency against Keighley and sexual assault against other teenage girls, one of which he had been in prison for. After his conviction, his trial judge recommended a minimum sentence of 25 years; but the Lord Chief Justice then ruled that life must mean life, which the Home Secretary agreed with. The term was reset in 1997 to the original 25 years, which was reduced again to 23 years in 2006.
- Thomas Quigley and Paul Kavanagh were IRA terrorists both convicted of two murders in a bomb attack in 1981 by the Chelsea Barracks which also injured 39 people. They were both sentenced to 35 years in prison each in 1985 and were told in 1996 by the Home Secretary Michael Howard that they were to receive whole-life tariffs; however, the order was reversed by the Belfast High Court in 1997 after an appeal by the two men and they were released under the Good Friday Agreement.
- David Wynne Roberts was convicted of murdering a pensioner who was a friend of his grandmother in Anglesey, Wales when he was 14 in 1969 and served seven years in youth detention before being released in 1976 and moving to the North West of England. In 1985, he went to Blackpool where he met a staff from a hotel in Ambleside, Cumbria and stayed with them until he disappeared in early-1986 when the body of the hotel owner was discovered in a cottage, where she was stabbed and strangled with her own scarf. He gave himself in to police in London within a month after the crime and was convicted of murder with a recommended minimum of 18 years, with the Home Secretary setting a whole-life tariff in 1988, before being reduced to 22 years in 2005 on appeal.
- John Cannan, who was convicted of the murder of Shirley Banks in Bristol on 8 October 1987, attempted kidnapping of Julia Holman and a rape in Reading. He was sentenced with a recommendation that should never be released from prison by Mr Justice Drake at Exeter Crown Court in April 1989; however, this was overturned when the Lord Chief Justice and the Home Secretary at the time decided that he should serve at least 35 years instead. He died in prison in 2024.
- Howard Hughes, who was convicted in July 1996 of the Murder of Sophie Hook in Llandudno 12 months earlier. He was jailed for life with a recommendation that he should never be released. In November 2002, Hughes was one of four convicted child murderers who received 50-year minimum terms imposed by the-then Home Secretary David Blunkett shortly before politicians were stripped of their powers to decide minimum terms for life sentence prisoners. The 50-year minimum term meant that Hughes would not be able to apply for parole until 2045 and the age of 80.
- Timothy Morss and Brett Tyler, who murdered nine-year-old Daniel Handley from East London in October 1994 and buried his body near Bristol, where it was found five months later. They were sentenced to life imprisonment in May 1996 and the trial judge recommended that they should never be released, as he felt they would never cease to pose a danger to children. In November 2002, the pair were among four convicted child murderers who were issued with 50-year minimum terms by the then Home Secretary David Blunkett, just before politicians were stripped of their powers to set minimum terms for life sentence prisoners; this meant that Morss and Tyler would both be over 80 years old before parole could be considered.
- Roy Whiting, who murdered Sarah Payne in West Sussex in July 2000, was told by his trial judge when convicted in December 2001 that his crime (combined with the fact that he had a previous conviction for child abduction and indecent assault) was a rare case for which a life sentence should mean life. In November 2002, Home Secretary David Blunkett ruled that Whiting should serve at least 50 years in prison, meaning he would only qualify for parole if he lived to the age of 92 or beyond, although this in practice revoked the whole-life tariff recommended in court. Whiting appealed against this ruling, his lawyers arguing that Blunkett's ruling had been politically motivated as he was on the verge of losing his powers to set minimum terms for life sentence prisoners, and that the government was under mounting pressure from the British public due to the recent start of a firefighters strike. The crime had also attracted widespread media and public attention, and led to calls for tighter laws regarding the monitoring of convicted sex offenders. The ruling also came days after the death of Myra Hindley, whose continued imprisonment saw her described by some sources as a "political prisoner" whose sentence was repeatedly increased to serve the interests of the serving government. Whiting's appeal was heard in June 2010, when the High Court (which by this stage now had the final say on how long a life sentence prisoner should serve before being considered for parole) reduced Whiting's minimum sentence to 40 years, meaning that he will first qualify for parole from 2041 and the age of 82.
- David Morris was convicted in 2002 murdering three generations of the same family in 1999. His victims were 80-year-old Doris Dawson, her 34-year-old daughter Mandy Power and her two granddaughters, 10-year-old Katie and 8-year-old Emily, by beating them with a pole and then setting the house on fire where their bodies were discovered by firefighters and the trial judge said that the "exceptional savagery" of the murders meant that Morris should never be released. However, in July 2007, the sentenced was reduced to a recommendation of 32 years in prison.
- David Bieber, an American former marine who fatally shot an already wounded policeman in the head and wounded two others in Leeds on Boxing Day 2003, also injuring two other officers (which saw him convicted on two counts of attempted murder), was jailed for life in December 2004 with a recommendation he should never be released. The whole-life tariff was quashed in July 2008 and replaced by one of 37 years. This means he will be at least 75 before parole can be considered.
- Stephen Ayre, who was paroled in 2005 after serving 20 years of a life sentence for the murder of a 25-year-old woman, committed rape of a 10-year-old boy at knifepoint in Bradford within months of his release. He was sentenced to life imprisonment again at his trial in April 2006, and told that he should never be released, a recommendation normally only made in the case of people convicted of murder. However, his whole-life tariff was later quashed on appeal and replaced with a minimum of 10 years. However, Ayre was never released and died in prison from lung cancer on September 15, 2018.
- Trevor Hamilton, jailed for life in August 2006 for the murder of 65-year-old librarian Attracta Haron in Northern Ireland in December 2003. Hamilton, who was 21 when he committed the murder and 24 when jailed, had his whole-life tariff reduced to 35 years on appeal in June 2008, meaning that he will be in his late fifties before parole can be considered.
- Clement McNally who was serving a life term for stabbing a friend outside a house in 2002, strangled his cellmate Anthony Hesketh in Manchester's Strangeways Prison in September 2003 and pleaded guilty to manslaughter and was given a whole-life tariff as a result. In October 2009, it was reduced on appeal to 20 years in prison on account of his mentally abnormal condition.
- Reginald Wilson (now known as Reginald Zenshen) was convicted in 1991 of murdering skin specialist David Birkett with a hammer in 1990 and was sentenced to life in prison. Three years later he was informed by the Home Secretary, Michael Howard, that life should mean life. This was reduced to a 30-year tariff in 2008 by Mr Justice Tugenhat in the High Court; that sentence was upheld against a challenge from the Attorney General that it was unduly lenient. He has proved to be a disruptive and dangerous prisoner; he tried to stab a prison officer in 1999 and was transferred to the prisons close supervision centre unit where he is held in the exceptional risk unit. His tariff expired in 2021, and in 2023 he overturned the Secretary of State for Justice's refusal to move him to open conditions, forcing the Secretary of State to remake his decision.
- John Hilton was convicted of murder with two other men, Philip Kelly and Charles Connelly during the Mitcham Co-op Robbery and was sentenced to life in prison, while his accomplice George Thatcher was sentenced to death by hanging for capital murder in 1963, only to have his death sentence quashed soon afterwards and replaced with a life sentence from which he was paroled after 18 years. John Hilton served 15 years and was released on licence in 1978, where a month after he shot and killed a diamond jeweller and accidentally shot his partner who then bled to death, he was then given a whole-life tariff. The sentence was later reduced to 25 years in prison in 2009 on account of exceptional progress in prison.
- Peter Bryan killed Nisha Sheth, the daughter of an employer who sacked him for stealing, with a hammer in 1993. He was released in 2004 and by agreement of the doctors at the Newham General Hospital allowed to leave the ward on which he was staying whenever he liked. On this ward, he murdered Bryan Cherry by dismembering him and then eating a part of his brain. When he was admitted to Broadmoor, he killed Richard Loudwell, who was awaiting trial for murder by bashing his head against the floor and strangling him and as a result was given a whole-life tariff. It was reduced on appeal to 15 years in 2006 on the basis that the trial judge didn't give enough consideration to his mental health.
- Brian Maurice Hogg was convicted alongside Jeremy Wing of raping two young children, leaving them with lifelong trauma and injuries. Hogg also had previous convictions for similar offences against children. Both men received whole-life orders in 2002. An appeal in 2007 later reduced Hogg's prison term to life imprisonment with a minimum of ten years on the basis that his crimes were not severe enough to warrant a whole-life order, with Mrs Justice Swift ruling that the trial judge's sentencing of Hogg had been "wrong in principle". Hogg died from sepsis while still a prisoner in 2015, at the age of 73.
- Danilo Restivo was convicted in 2011 for the 2002 murder of Heather Barnet. In a second trial, Restivo was later sentenced to 30 years in prison for the murder of a teenager in his native Italy in 1993. In 2012 his term was reduced to 40 years as part of a joint appeal by several prisoners with long sentences.
- Michael Roberts was convicted in 2012 of numerous offences between 1988 and 2005, including rapes. His sentence was reduced to life with a 25-year minimum at the same appeal that reduced Restivo's sentence. Roberts was the first person to be sentenced to a whole-life term without having committed murder.
- Anthony Entwistle, then aged 38, murdered 16-year-old Michelle Calvy in April 1987, abducting her from a towpath in Blackburn, raping her, and strangling her with her T-shirt. He dumped her body in Tockholes. The murder was 18 days after his release from a 10-year sentence in 1980 for rape, which followed another seven-year sentence in 1974 for sexually assaulting two women. He was found guilty of Calvy's murder at Preston Crown Court in March 1988, and sentenced to life imprisonment with trial judge Mr. Justice Rose recommending a minimum term of 25 years. He was later given a whole-life tariff by the Home Secretary Douglas Hurd. In 2009, Mr. Justice Davis ruled at the High Court that Entwistle could be considered for release after 25 years (less 10 months spent on remand) if he was judged to no longer be a threat to the public, rather than imposing a whole-life tariff, saying that "He can only be released if ever (and it may be never) he is assessed as no longer a danger to the public." The parole board turned down his request for release in June 2013.
- David Martin Simmons had originally received a whole-life term for rape and false imprisonment. This was reduced to a ten-year minimum when he appealed alongside Restivo, Roberts, and others whose appeals were not successful.
- Donald Andrews had received a whole-life term for rape and kidnapping in 2012, while having two previous convictions for manslaughter. This was reduced to a twelve-year minimum when he appealed in 2015, making him eligible for release in 2024.
- Simon Smith was convicted of murdering three of his children (all under a year old) between 1989 and 1994, which were initially believed to be cot deaths. His trial judge at Stafford Crown Court in 1996 recommended that he should never be released. Smith was, however, told at a later date he could apply for parole from 2020 after serving a minimum of 24 years.
- Ian Stewart was convicted of murdering his fiancée Helen Bailey and later his wife Diane Stewart and sentenced to life without parole. However, Stewart appealed to the Court of Appeal and had his sentence for Bailey's murder reduced to a minimum of 35 years. Wayne Couzens, who murdered Sarah Everard, appealed alongside Stewart but his whole-life order was upheld.

== See also ==
- Life imprisonment in England and Wales
- List of longest prison sentences
- List of longest prison sentences served
