= Murder of Matt Ratana =

2020 shooting of a British police officer

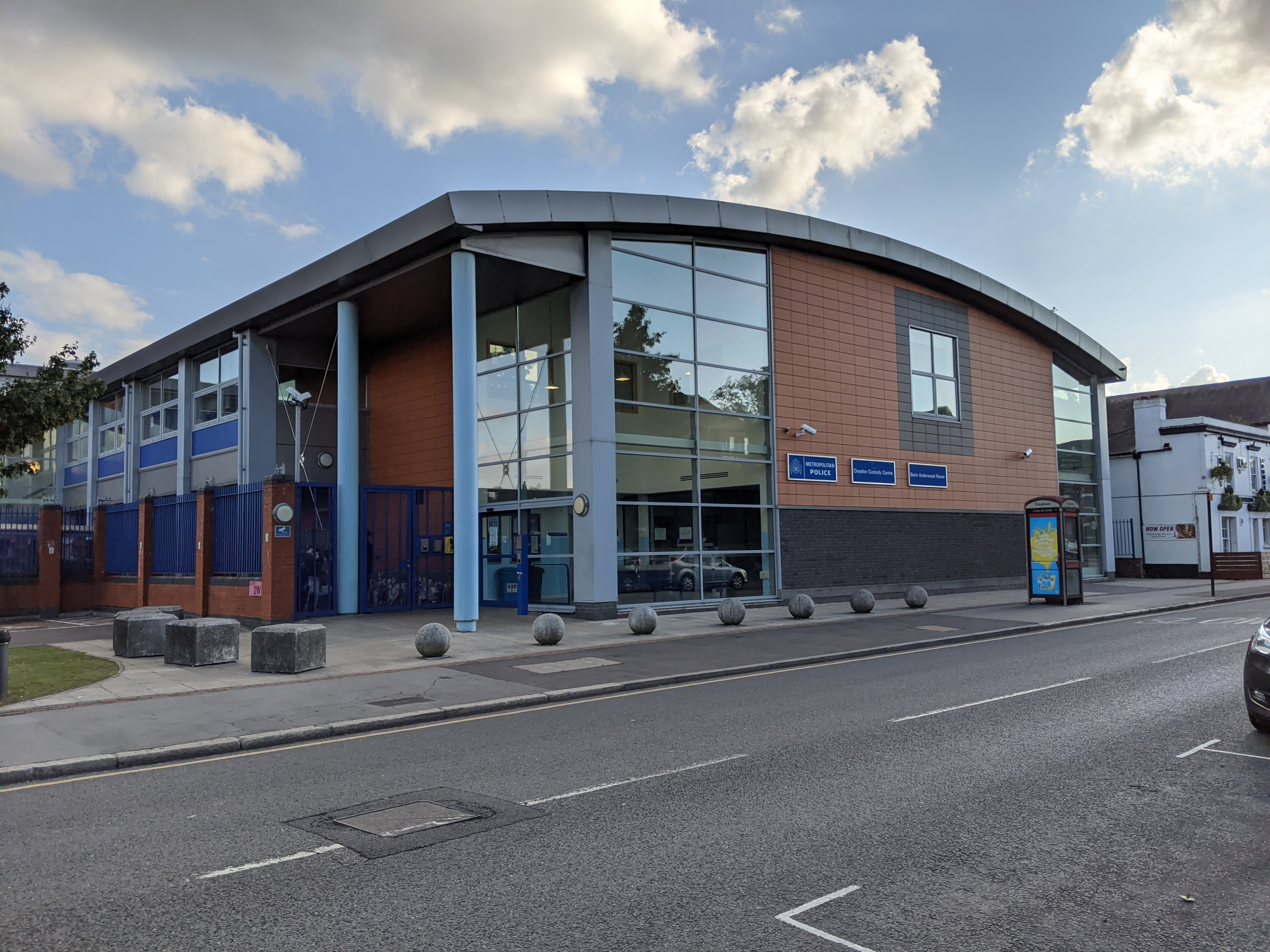
- Croydon Custody Centre, scene of the shooting
- Date: 25 September 2020
- Location: Croydon, London, United Kingdom
- Type: Shooting
- Convicted: Louis de Zoysa
- Charges: Murder
- Sentence: Life imprisonment (whole life order)

Matiu Ratana (3 May 1966 – 25 September 2020) was a New Zealand-born British police sergeant who was shot dead at Croydon Custody Centre in London on 25 September 2020. At the time of his murder, he was nearing retirement, having served in the Metropolitan Police for nearly 30 years. Ratana is the first police officer to be fatally shot in the UK since the murders of Nicola Hughes and Fiona Bone in 2012.

== Background ==
Ratana was born in the Hawke's Bay Region of New Zealand and was of Māori descent. Born Matiu Ratana, he was known as Matt to his family and colleagues. He moved to England in 1989, working for the Metropolitan Police for nearly 30 years. Ratana had also served with New Zealand Police, joining the British High Commission Wing in 2003 and serving in the Auckland City and Counties Manukau police districts before returning to the UK in 2008.

== Incident ==
On the morning of 25 September 2020, Louis de Zoysa, a 23-year-old man, was arrested for drugs-related offences and possession of ammunition and taken to Croydon Custody Centre (Berin Underwood House) in a police vehicle. While Sgt Matt Ratana was approaching the suspect to assist in a search, De Zoysa fired three shots, hitting Ratana twice, once in the chest, and once in the thigh, before being tackled to the ground. During the struggle, De Zoysa fired a fourth and final shot, striking himself in the neck, causing brain damage.

Ratana was taken to St George's Hospital in nearby Tooting, where he was pronounced dead shortly after. No police firearms were discharged during the incident. A non-police revolver was recovered from the scene, which had been missed in the initial pat-down of the subject. The weapon was a Colt .41 Model 1895 'Navy' double action revolver, which De Zoysa had holstered under his armpit. The suspect was in handcuffs during the incident, with his hands behind his back. CCTV captured the incident.

== Investigation ==
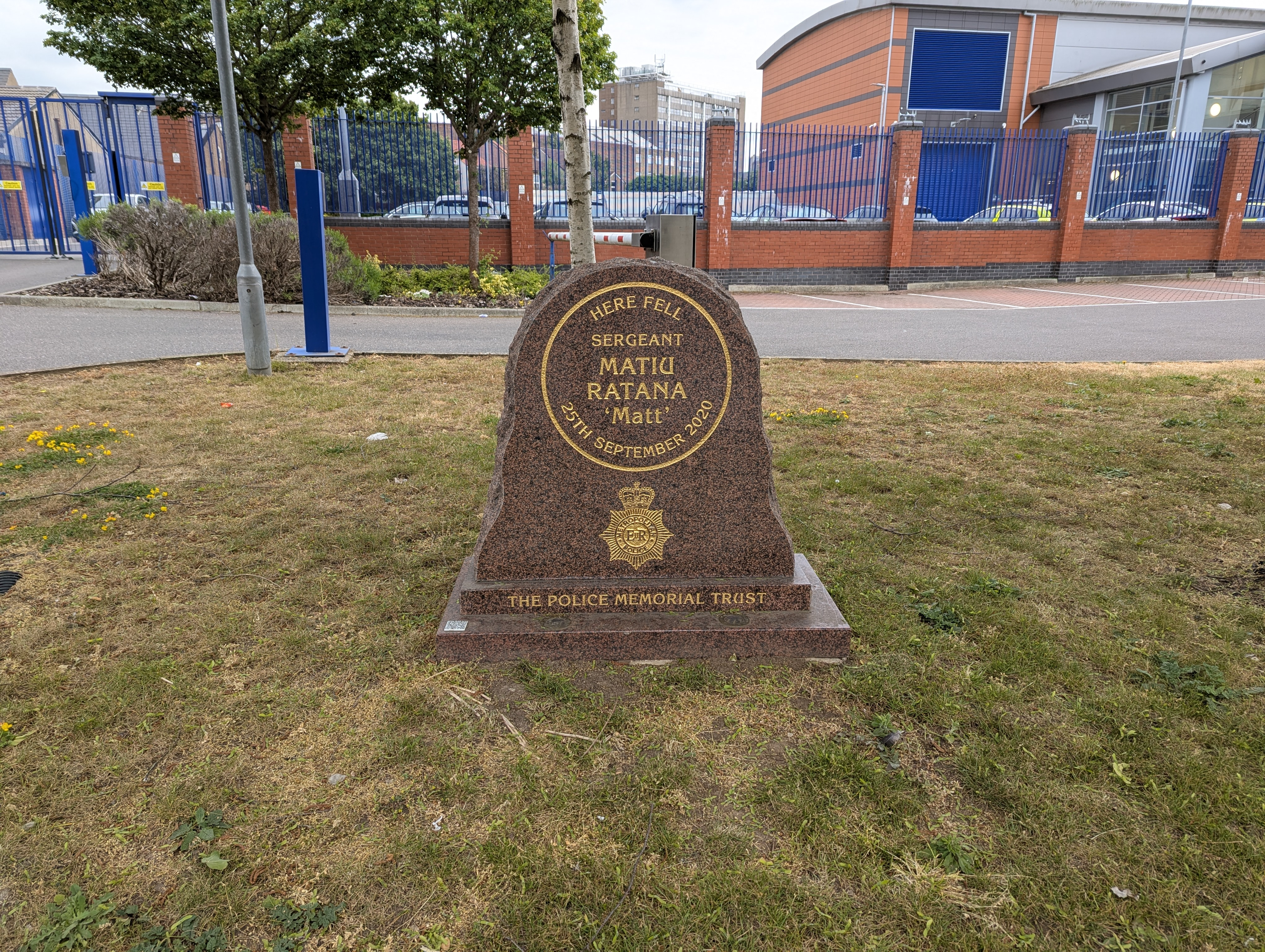
A memorial was erected by the Police Memorial Trust on the grounds of Croydon Custody Centre on 25 September 2024.

De Zoysa had previously been referred to the Prevent programme, an anti-extremism programme developed by the government in an attempt to prevent individuals from becoming radicalized. Several crime scenes were established, a cordon was put in place around the Anderson Heights block of flats in Norbury, and a controlled explosion took place in one of the crime scenes in Banstead, Surrey.

Louis De Zoysa, aged 23, was arrested on 13 November 2020 on suspicion of murdering a police officer, when he was considered well enough though still requiring hospital treatment after himself being wounded by one of the bullets fired during the shooting. On 29 June 2021, he was deemed well enough to be formally charged with murder. On 28 April 2023, Louis De Zoysa pleaded not guilty to the murder whilst appearing via video link from hospital at Northampton Crown Court. De Zoysa was due to stand trial at Northampton on 6 June 2023. De Zoysa's lawyer argued that De Zoysa, who has Asperger syndrome, was experiencing an autistic meltdown at the time of the shooting and was, therefore, not guilty of murder.

Following his trial at Northampton Crown Court, De Zoysa was convicted of murder on 23 June 2023. He was sentenced on 27 July 2023 to life imprisonment with a whole life order.

On 8 May 2025 the court rejected his appeal against his conviction and whole-life term.

== Inquest ==
In November 2023, an inquest into Ratana's death took place at Croydon Town Hall. Senior coroner Sarah Ormond-Walshe found that there had been a "failure to carry out a safe, thorough and systematic search". The inquest concluded on 13 November 2023 with a finding of unlawful killing.

The inquest heard that PC Richard Davey, a probationary constable who had searched De Zoysa following his arrest, admitted that he had neglected his training and should have discovered the weapon. His colleague, PC Samantha Still, who assisted during the search, also accepted that the gun should have been found. Officers had found ammunition in De Zoysa's pocket, which was initially mistaken for nitrous oxide canisters, but did not locate the revolver or holster. Footage from the police van showed De Zoysa wriggling and jerking during the journey to custody, which expert evidence said was consistent with him repositioning the firearm while handcuffed.

The inquest and subsequent investigation prompted the Independent Office for Police Conduct to recommend that handheld search wands be introduced in police response vehicles and vehicles used to transport detained people across England and Wales. While the arresting officers had not strictly adhered to their training, they did not breach the police standards of professional behaviour, and no disciplinary actions were required.

== See also ==
- List of British police officers killed in the line of duty
- List of prisoners with whole life orders
