= Lawrence Bierton =

British murderer (born 1960)

- Born: 30 December 1959 (age 66)
- Conviction: Murder
- Penalty: 2 life sentences

Details
- Victims: 3
- Date: 1995, 2021
- Country: England
- Targets: Aileen Dudill; Elsie Gregory; Pauline Quinn
- Killed: 3
- Weapon: coffee table

Lawrence Bierton (born 30 December 1959) is an English convicted serial killer. In 1996, he was convicted of the double murder of two elderly sisters in Rotherham. In 2023 he was convicted of a third murder he committed while released on licence.

== First crime ==
On 25 June 1995, 79-year-old Aileen Dudill and her 72-year-old sister Elsie Gregory discovered their gardeners, Lawrence Bierton and Michael Pluck, stealing from them. Bierton and Pluck reacted by bludgeoning and suffocating the sisters to death. Bierton and Pluck then piled the sisters' living room furniture over the bodies and set it all on fire.

Bierton and Pluck were both jailed for life at Sheffield Crown Court in 1996.

== Release and reimprisonment ==
Michael Pluck died in HMP Rye Hill on 13 February 2012 after failed appeals in 2002 and 2010.

Bierton was released from prison on licence in 2017. He was recalled to prison in 2018 but was released on licence again in 2020.

On 9 November 2021, in Worksop, Nottinghamshire, Bierton battered his 73-year-old neighbour Pauline Quinn to death with her own coffee table. The cause of death was traumatic head injuries. His abuse of drug and alcohol was considered by the prosecution to be a contributing factor.

In January 2023, the Probation Service released their review of the case. Brendan Clarke-Smith, the local MP for Bassetlaw, called for a public inquiry. On 20 December 2023, Bierton received a whole life sentence. The Probation Service apologised to the families for its failings.

== See also ==
- List of prisoners with whole life orders
- Arthur Hutchinson (murderer)
