= John Childs (murderer) =

British serial murderer

- Other name: Bruce Childs
- Spouse: Tina Childs (m. 1978; div. 1982)
- Children: 2
- Motive: Contract killing
- Criminal charges: Murder
- Penalty: Whole life tariff

Details
- Victims: 6
- Span of crimes: 1974–1978
- Country: England
- Date apprehended: 1979

Notes
- Terry Pinfold and Harry MacKenney were implicated in the murders by Childs, but released on appeal in 2003

John Childs, also known as Bruce Childs, is a British hitman and serial killer from East London who was convicted in 1979 for a series of apparent contract killings, though none of the bodies have been found. He implicated Terry Pinfold and Harry MacKenney in the murders, but they were released in 2003 after the judge ruled that Childs is a "pathological liar". Childs is serving a whole life tariff. He is known as the most prolific hitman in the UK.

== Investigation and trials ==
John Childs confessed to having committed the murders to Detective Chief Superintendent Frank Cater in June 1979, after Childs was arrested in September 1978 for a series of bank and security van robberies in Hertfordshire. The investigation was based at Waltham Abbey police station in Essex. Childs was convicted of carrying out six murders – of Terence "Terry" Eve, Robert Brown, George Brett, Terry Brett, Frederick "Freddie" Sherwood, and Ronald Andrews – from November 1974 to October 1978. Their remains have not been found, and no murder weapons were uncovered.

Childs was tried at the Old Bailey, with John Mathew QC prosecuting. Childs was convicted on 4 December 1979 and was sentenced by Mr Justice Lawson to six concurrent life sentences. Childs then turned Queen's Evidence to implicate his supposed former employers, Essex businessmen and former prisoners Terry Pinfold and Harry "Big H" MacKenney, in the murder of Eve and the other victims. Other co-accused were Leonard Thompson and Paul Morton-Thurtle. Former prisoner Terence Eve, who had become a toy maker in Dagenham, went missing in November 1974. Eve had made teddy bears in the same converted church hall that Pinfold and MacKenney used to make diving equipment for their company. Also missing was a haulage contractor, George Brett, along with his 10-year-old son, Terry, who had disappeared on 4 January 1975.

A second eight-week-long trial began at the Old Bailey in October 1980, after Childs had been held in solitary confinement for 15 months. The judge was Mr Justice May, the prosecutor was David Tudor Price, and MacKenney's defence lawyer was Michael Mansfield QC. Childs said at trial that Eve was killed so that they could take his business; he said Eve was beaten and strangled, and that his body was dismembered and burned. He said that the defendants pretended to offer Brett work so that he would visit the factory, and that MacKenney shot him and his son with a Sten gun. Childs said that Andrews was killed because MacKenney was having an affair with his wife; that nursing home owner Sherwood was killed because of a £7000 debt, and Brown was killed because of what he knew about Eve's murder. Childs said he had considered killing MacKenney with a crossbow because he was afraid of him.

The defence called as witnesses two prisoners who said that Childs had confessed to them that he had falsely implicated MacKenney because he was worried that his own wife Tina would be accused of murder. Pinfold and MacKenney were convicted by the jury on 28 November 1980, though MacKenney was cleared of involvement in Eve's murder. The other accused men, Thompson and Morton-Thurtle, were found not guilty. MacKenney was sentenced to life imprisonment and had to be restrained by guards when the sentence was delivered. It was later reported that Childs had been issued with a whole life tariff by at least one Home Secretary after the tariff-setting system was introduced in 1983, making it unlikely that he would ever be released.

== Claims of Childs ==
Childs wrote a statement in July 1986 when he was held at HMP Winchester, admitting that Pinfold was "only convicted because of my perjured evidence".

In 1997, The People reported that Childs had written to a penfriend through the Prison Reform Trust, describing how he dismembered the bodies of his victims and burned them on a 55-gallon drum in his council flat in Poplar. When he was at Long Lartin and then Frankland Prison, County Durham, Childs was interviewed by the Daily Mirror newspaper, who reported on the front page in 1998 that he had confessed to committing five more murders.

== Appeal of co-accused ==
Pinfold and MacKenney unsuccessfully appealed against their convictions in 1981 and were denied leave to appeal in 1987. Pinfold was released on bail in September 2001. After a referral by the Criminal Cases Review Commission, both Pinfold and MacKenney had their convictions overturned at the Court of Appeal in December 2003. Lord Woolf, with Mr Justice Aikens and Mr Justice Davis, ruled that Childs' evidence against them was unreliable because he was a "pathological liar". A forensic psychiatrist, David Somekh, concluded that Childs had a personality disorder that led him to compulsively lie, and the original trial jury were blocked from being told this.

Childs' account of the murders changed. Pinfold's lawyer Danny Simpson said that former Detective Chief Inspector James Harrison-Griffiths, when investigating Eve's disappearance, was told by Commander Bert Wickstead of the Metropolitan Police in 1976 that Eve was alive and living in West London, and that Childs had previously written a letter that said Childs' wife had asked him to kill Eve after he sexually assaulted her. MacKenney's former wife Eileen said in her autobiography, published by Simon and Schuster in 2011, that Childs' story about the murders was false, and that he was really from Wales and called Martin Jones; he had taken the name Childs from a previous tenant of his flat.

== Personal life ==
Childs joined the British Army as a sapper, but was expelled after nine months for committing burglary. Reports of the 1980 trial said that he collected weapons and war books. Childs had been jailed for stealing motorbikes before he was released in 1972 and began working for MacKenney and Pinfold. Childs was married with two daughters, but his wife Tina divorced him in 1982 following his conviction.

== See also ==
- List of prisoners with whole-life tariffs
- List of miscarriage of justice cases#United Kingdom
- List of serial killers in the United Kingdom
