= Andrew Dawson (murderer) =

British serial killer (born 1962)

- Born: 1962 (age 63–64); Ormskirk, Lancashire, England
- Penalty: Life imprisonment with a whole-life order

Details
- Victims: 3
- Span of crimes: 1981–2010
- Country: United Kingdom

Andrew Dawson (born 1962) is a British serial killer who committed three murders between 1981 and 2010. He was issued with a whole-life order for the latter two murders and thus will never be released from prison.

== First murder and conviction ==
In August 1981, in his native Ormskirk, Dawson murdered his first victim Henry Walsh. Walsh was a shopkeeper who was 91 years old at the time of his death and was stabbed 11 times. Dawson was convicted of the murder of Walsh in 1982 and was released on license in 1999. He was returned to prison three times between 2003 and 2007 before being released in 2008.

== Murder of Matthews and Hancock ==
On 25 July 2010, John David Matthews was found stabbed to death in his flat in the Derby area of Chaddesden. Five days later, in the same building, the body of Paul Hancock was found. He had also been fatally stabbed. On both occasions, Dawson placed their bodies in a bathtub of their respective flats so he could remove their odours.

On the same day Matthews' body was found, Dawson was arrested in Whitehaven. On 18 July 2011, he was sentenced to life imprisonment with a whole life order.

== Documentaries ==
Dawson has been featured in a number of documentaries:

- In 2012, a series 1 episode of the Crime+ Investigation series When Life Means Life documented the case
- In 2020, a series 4 episode of Britain's Most Evil Killers documented the case

== See also ==
- List of prisoners with whole life orders
- List of serial killers in the United Kingdom
