= Stephen Farrow =

British spree killer (1964/1965 – 2023)

Stephen Farrow (1964/1965 – 21 August 2023) was an English vagrant who served a whole-life tariff for two murders committed in early 2012. Farrow, whom psychiatrists diagnosed with antisocial personality disorder, had an obsessive hatred of Christianity, which he attributed to sexual abuse from a priest. He stabbed to death 77-year-old retired teacher Betty Yates in Bewdley, Worcestershire, and the Reverend John Suddards (aged 59) in Thornbury, Gloucestershire. He also confessed to the unsubstantiated murder of a backpacker in Devon in 1988.

== Background ==
Farrow was hyperactive from a young age, and was sent home from his first day at school. At the age of 10, he set a church altar on fire and watched it burn. He hated his strict father, but loved his mother. As an adult, Farrow was a heavy smoker of cannabis.

In 1994, Farrow was convicted of aggravated burglary at the home of an elderly woman in Stourbridge. He told a forensic psychiatrist that he had fantasies of committing rape during burglaries. When it was being decided whether he should serve his punishment in prison or in a mental hospital, he told a psychiatrist from Ashworth Hospital that he had wanted to kill from his teenage years, and had already murdered a backpacker in Devon six years prior. Although the doctor diagnosed him with antisocial personality disorder, he theorised that Farrow was exaggerating his claims in order to have a safer place of detention than prison.

During his trial, Farrow admitted to a burglary in Thornbury around the turn of 2012. He pinned a note to the house's kitchen table, reading, "Be thankful you did not come back or we would have killed you Christian scum. I... hate God". The threat was not personal, as the occupants were not religious. On New Year's Eve, he texted a friend that, "Church will be the first to suffer".

== Murders ==
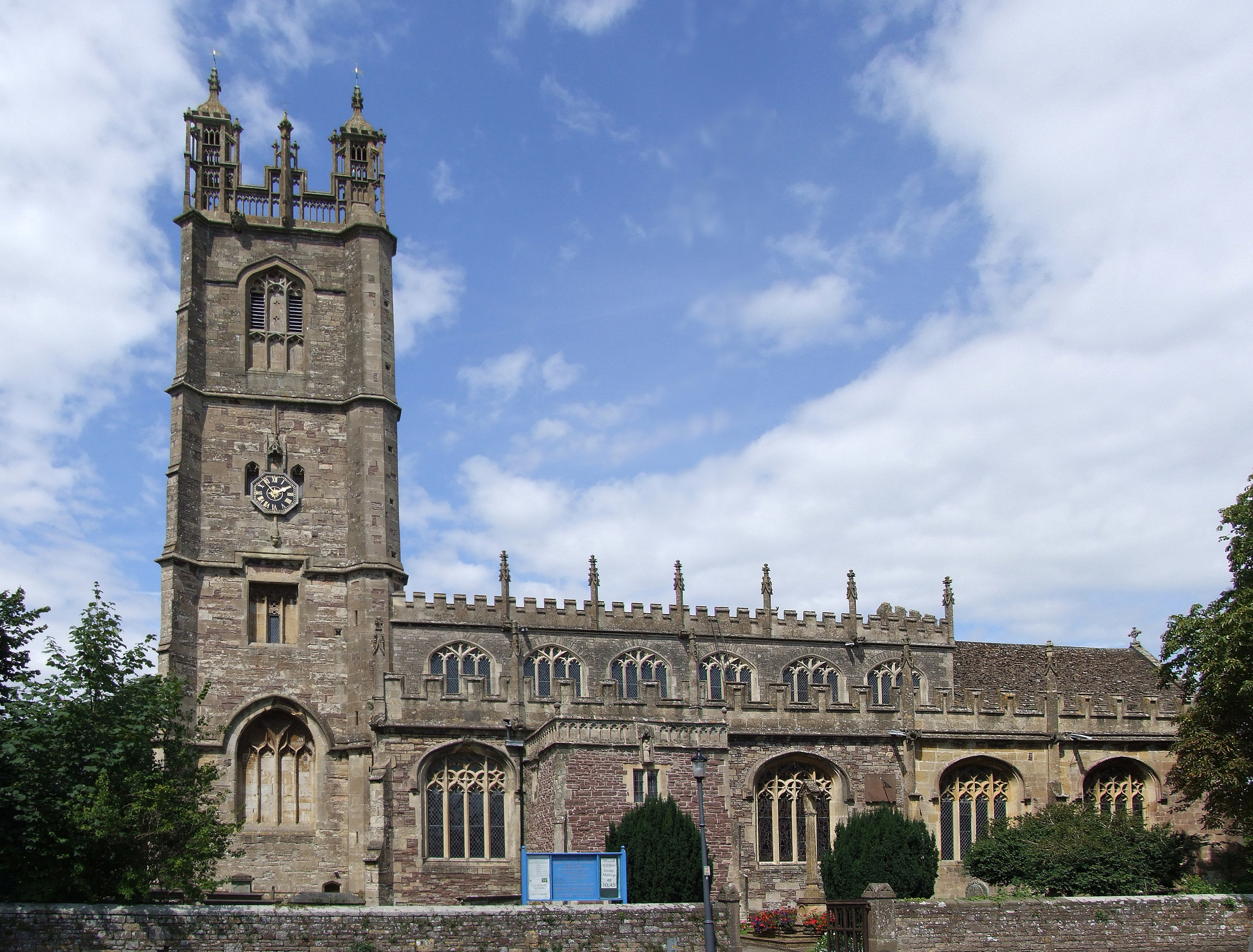
The Reverend John Suddards was the vicar at the Church of St Mary the Virgin in Thornbury.

On 4 January 2012, Farrow broke into Betty Yates' isolated cottage and killed her by stabbing her in the neck. Detectives suspected that she had been beaten with her walking stick before her death. Crimestoppers offered a reward of £10,000 for information on the murder, and new leads were investigated after the crime was featured on BBC One's Crimewatch. Yates and Farrow were acquainted.

On 14 February, the Reverend John Suddards was killed at his vicarage; Avon and Somerset Police declared that the death was suspicious after his body was found by builders. Suddards, a former lawyer who joined the clergy after a car accident, had only moved to his new parish in June 2011, from Witham, Essex. He had previously spoken of the risks of his occupation, in which he would regularly welcome strangers into his home. After stabbing Suddards to death, Farrow drank the vicar's beer and watched a DVD, before stealing his mobile phone and watch.

== Legal proceedings ==
On 18 February, police named Farrow as a suspect in Suddards' murder, warning the public not to approach him. He was arrested the following day in Folkestone, Kent, where he was also questioned on Yates' murder, and was charged with both murders and the burglary on 22 February. A week later, a 43-year-old man who had been previously arrested on suspicion of Suddards' death was eliminated from the investigation.

On 29 June, Farrow pleaded not guilty to both murders, but admitted to the burglary. His trial at Bristol Crown Court began on 4 October; he later admitted Suddards' manslaughter on the grounds of diminished responsibility. The jury were unanimous in finding him guilty of killing Suddards, and an 11–1 majority found him guilty of the murder of Yates. The judge, who called Farrow "sadistic", sentenced him to spend the rest of his life in prison. Detective Chief Inspector Simon Crisp of Avon and Somerset Police stated that tracking Farrow was difficult due to his nomadic lifestyle, but an anonymous phone call from a woman in Kent had led to his arrest.

After the sentencing, Suddards' sister Hilary Bosworth questioned if the murders could have been avoided if people with Farrow's record of violence were properly dealt with, asking, "Do we, as a society, need to think again about how we might better monitor those in the community?"

Farrow died at HMP Frankland on 21 August 2023, at the age of 58.

== Legacy of victims ==
Suddards' parishioners and family set up a Memorial Fund to raise money for causes with which he was involved, including the reintegration of the homeless and scholarships for students of Christian scripture.

== See also ==
List of prisoners with whole life orders
