= Arthur Hutchinson (murderer) =

British murderer (born 1941)

- Born: 19 February 1941 (age 85); Hartlepool, County Durham, England
- Conviction: Murder x 3, rape
- Criminal charges: Murder x 3, rape
- Penalty: Life Imprisonment

Details
- Date: 23 October 1983
- Country: England
- Locations: South Yorkshire, United Kingdom

Arthur Hutchinson (born 19 February 1941) is an English triple murderer.

Born in Hartlepool, County Durham, he attained notoriety in 1984 when he was convicted of three murders committed in Dore, Sheffield, South Yorkshire, on 23 October 1983. He remains in prison and, since 2008, has made a number of legal challenges to overturn his life sentence.

== Crimes ==
Hutchinson had already spent more than five years in prison for the attempted murder of his half brother, Dino, and had several prior convictions for sexual assault. On the morning of 28 September 1983 Hutchinson arrived at Selby Police Station after being arrested on suspicion of theft, burglary and rape. He asked to go to the toilet, and whilst there, he jumped out of a window in an attempt to escape and cut his knee on barbed wire.

After three and a half weeks on the run, late on the night of 23 October 1983, Hutchinson broke into the home of Basil Laitner, 59, his 55-year-old wife Avril, and their 28-year-old son Richard via a patio window, and stabbed all three of them to death. He then raped their 18-year-old daughter Nicola at knife-point before fleeing. Just hours earlier, the family had hosted the wedding reception of their other daughter Suzanne at the house. It is believed that Hutchinson was planning to commit an armed robbery.

His identity was established by the description given by Nicola Laitner, by a palm-print left on a champagne glass, and by a dental impression left by Hutchinson on a block of cheese. After spending another two weeks on the run, wearing disguises and moving from place to place in Barnsley, Nottinghamshire, Manchester, York, and Scarborough, he was finally caught on a farm in Hartlepool on 5 November 1983. The police had intercepted a phone call between Hutchinson and his mother in which Hutchinson had told her he intended to visit her, allowing them to narrow their search to the Greatham area where he was apprehended.

During his trial, on 11 September 1984, Hutchinson accused Mike Barron, then a reporter with the Sunday Mirror, of committing the murders. Hutchinson was found guilty of all three murders and the rape on 14 September 1984 after a four-hour deliberation, and sentenced to life imprisonment with a recommended minimum term of 18 years, which could have seen him released from prison in 2002 in the event of the Parole Board deciding that he was no longer a risk.

After the conviction, the then Home Secretary, Leon Brittan issued Hutchinson with a whole life tariff.

=== Appeals against sentence ===
Hutchinson later appealed against the Home Secretary's ruling. His case was heard on 16 May 2008 at the High Court, nearly six years after the final say on minimum terms for life sentence prisoners was transferred from the Home Secretary to the High Court. His solicitors argued that a whole life tariff was a breach of his human rights.

However, his appeal was rejected and the High Court agreed with the Home Secretary's ruling, upholding the life sentence.

Hutchinson lodged a second appeal against his sentence shortly afterwards, his case returning to the High Court on 6 October 2008, but again was rejected.

On 13 July 2013, the European Court of Human Rights ruled that the whole life tariff was a breach of human rights. However, on 3 February 2015, Hutchinson lost an appeal in the European Court of Human Rights against his sentence, with the court's judges ruling that whole life tariffs were appropriate in certain cases, just as the High Court of England and Wales had 12 months earlier, on the condition that such sentences were reviewed within 25 years of the offender being sentenced. Within four months, however, it was reported that he was returning to the European Court of Human Rights for a fresh challenge against his sentence.

=== Referral to Grand Chamber of the European Court of Human Rights ===
On 1 June 2015, Hutchinson's case was referred to the Grand Chamber of the European Court of Human Rights. The referral was made at the request of Hutchinson and his case was heard by the Grand Chamber on 21 October 2015. On 17 January 2017, Hutchinson again lost his case, with the court ruling that the UK had the right to impose whole life orders in appropriate circumstances.

== See also ==
- List of prisoners with whole life orders
- List of people sentenced to more than one life imprisonment
