= Stephen McColl =

British criminal

Stephen McColl was a criminal recruited by the Greater Manchester Police to act as an informer. He carried out a series of crimes for two years before being convicted of two murders in 2006, which saw him sentenced to life imprisonment with a recommendation that he should never be released. The following year, the High Court ruled that he should serve a minimum of 35 years before being considered for parole, which is set to keep him in prison until at least 2041. According to the Manchester Evening News:

"Despite warnings by another police force that he was a dangerous man who should not be used, GMP officers paid hundreds of pounds to Stephen McColl."

McColl killed 22-year-old Michael Doran two months prior to beginning work as an informant. He had set a trap that led him to discover that Doran was working as an informant and feeding the police information about him. Working as an armed robber, McColl continued to plan and execute violent crimes over the next two years of his employment with the police. This crime spree reached its peak with the informer torturing and killing 30-year-old underworld rival Philip Noakes. Both murders were motivated by removing "a liability", and both men vanished while on "trips to Scotland" with McColl.

McColl was enabled to achieve his double life as police informer and armed robber/murderer by using knowledge gained from his previous job as a funeral director's assistant to pick out a suitable area to bury the bodies.
