= Life imprisonment in England and Wales =

Life sentence that lasts until the death of the prisoner

In England and Wales, life imprisonment is a sentence that lasts until the death of the prisoner, although in most cases the prisoner will be eligible for parole after a minimum term ("tariff") set by the judge. In exceptional cases a judge may impose a "whole life order", meaning that the offender is never considered for parole, although they may still be released on compassionate grounds at the discretion of the home secretary. Whole-life orders are usually imposed for aggravated murder. The general age limit for a whole life order is 21, however those aged 18 to 20 may be granted a whole life order under exceptional circumstances.

Until 1957, the mandatory sentence for all adults convicted of murder was death by hanging. The Homicide Act 1957 limited the circumstances in which murderers could be executed, mandating life imprisonment in all other cases. Capital punishment for murder was suspended for 5 years by the Murder (Abolition of Death Penalty) Act 1965 and was abolished in 1969 (1973 in Northern Ireland by the Northern Ireland (Emergency Provisions) Act 1973) since which time murder has carried a mandatory sentence of life imprisonment.

The Criminal Justice Act 2003 introduced new mandatory life sentences and created a new kind of life sentence, called "imprisonment for public protection" which could be imposed for even those offences that would otherwise carry a maximum sentence of ten years. The consequent unprecedented levels of prison overcrowding prompted sentencing reform, including stricter criteria for the imposition of such sentences and some restoration of judicial discretion, in the Criminal Justice and Immigration Act 2008. Imprisonment for public protection was abolished by the Legal Aid, Sentencing and Punishment of Offenders Act 2012, although some prisoners remain incarcerated under the former legislation.

Life imprisonment is applicable to only those defendants aged 18 and over. Those aged under 18 when the relevant offence was committed are sentenced to an indeterminate sentence (detention at His Majesty's pleasure). Any convict sentenced to a life sentence can, in principle, be held in custody for their whole life, assuming parole is never given for juveniles.

== History ==
When parliament was considering abolition of capital punishment, there were many MPs who were against the reform, and the deal offered was that former capital offences would receive a mandatory life sentence. Accordingly, life imprisonment replaced capital punishment for murderers, first for those whose sentences were commuted and later for those whose crimes were not "aggravated" within the meaning of the Homicide Act 1957. To begin with, it was fairly common for those sentenced to life to be released in around 10 to 15 years. As time passed, it came to be thought that longer sentences should be imposed, especially in cases such as the Moors murders, Peter Sutcliffe and Dennis Nilsen. The home secretary was empowered to make whole-life orders to ensure that particularly dangerous or heinous criminals served their life sentences without the possibility of parole. As of 2006, prisoners sentenced to mandatory life sentences served an average of 14 years and, for non-mandatory, the average stood at 9 years.

== Criminal Justice Act 2003 ==
Formerly, the home secretary reserved the right to set the "tariff" or minimum length of term for prisoners sentenced to life imprisonment. However, in November 2000, politicians were stripped of this power in relation to defendants aged under 18, following an appeal to the European Court of Human Rights by the murderers of James Bulger.

In November 2002, a similar decision in relation to adult offenders followed a successful challenge by convicted double murderer Anthony Anderson. Anderson had been sentenced to life imprisonment in 1988 with a recommended minimum term of 15 years, but the home secretary later informed him that he would have to serve at least 20 years. The House of Lords ruled that this was incompatible with his human rights. This judgment was upheld by the European Court of Human Rights. Since then, judges have set minimum terms and only the Court of Appeal or the Supreme Court of the United Kingdom can make any amendments to the sentence.

Although politicians can no longer decide when or if a life sentence prisoner can be considered for parole, the attorney general still has the power to petition the Court of Appeal in a bid to increase any prison terms that are seen as unduly lenient. This power can be exercised only within 28 days of the sentence and that limit cannot be extended under any circumstances.

The Criminal Justice Act 2003 sets out guidelines for how long murderers should spend in prison before being considered for parole. Judges are not obliged to follow the guidelines, but must give reasons in court if they depart from them – whether recommending a lesser or higher minimum term than in accordance with the guidelines.

The guidelines recommended that multiple murderers (who murder two or more people) whose crimes involved sexual abuse, pre-planning, abduction or terrorism should never be released from prison. Such a sentence is known as a "whole life order". The murder of a single child following abduction, sexual or sadistic conduct also qualifies, as does the murder of a police or prison officer during the course of their duty (since 2015) and murder committed to advance a political, religious or ideological cause – along with any murder that was committed by someone who had previously been convicted of murder. Other multiple murders (two or more) should carry a recommended minimum of 30 years as a starting point sentence prior to consideration of additional aggravating factors and of any mitigating factors.

A 30-year minimum should also apply to the worst single murders, including those with sexual or racial motives and the use of a firearm – until 2015, the murder of a police officer in the course of duty also came within this category. Most other murders should be subject to a 15-year minimum as a starting point. There have been numerous departures from these guidelines since they were first put into practice. For example, the judge who sentenced American fugitive David Bieber for the murder of a police officer said that he should never be released from prison, whereas statutory guidelines recommended a 30-year minimum for this type of murder – this was a decade before the act was amended to include the murder of a police officer in the course of duty as one of the offenders whose life sentences should mean life.

On 23 July 2008, David Bieber won a High Court appeal against the whole life tariff recommended by the trial judge, and was instead issued with a minimum term of 37 years, effectively meaning that he would not be released until at least 2041, by which time he would be 75 years old if still alive. In the case of Mark Goldstraw, who killed four people in an arson attack on a house in Staffordshire in 2006, the trial judge set a recommended minimum of 35 years; this crime met the guidelines for a whole life term as it involved planning and resulted in the death of more than one person.

Many life prisoners have received minimum terms, which, due to their length or the fact that the killer was middle aged or elderly when convicted, make it highly likely that they will never be released.

== Specified 'life sentence' offences ==
=== Violent offences ===
Act	Section and Offence
Common Law	Manslaughter; Kidnapping; False imprisonment
Offences against the Person Act 1861	Section 4 (soliciting murder); Section 16 (threats to kill); Section 18 (wounding with intent to cause grievous bodily harm); Section 20 (malicious wounding); Section 21 (attempting to choke, suffocate or strangle in order to commit or assist in committing an indictable offence); Section 22 (using chloroform etc to commit or assist in the committing of any indictable offence); Section 23 (maliciously administering poison etc so as to endanger life or inflict grievous bodily harm); Section 27 (abandoning children); Section 28 (causing bodily injury by explosives); Section 29 (using explosives etc with intent to do grievous bodily harm); Section 30 (placing explosives with intent to do bodily injury); Section 31 (setting spring guns etc with intent to do grievous bodily harm); Section 32 (endangering the safety of railway passengers); Section 35 (injuring persons by furious driving); Section 37 (assaulting officer preserving wreck); Section 38 (assault with intent to resist arrest); Section 47 (assault occasioning actual bodily harm).
Explosive Substances Act 1883	Section 2 (causing explosion likely to endanger life or property); Section 3 (attempt to cause explosion, or making or keeping explosive with intent to endanger life or property); Section 4 (making or possession of explosive under suspicious circumstances).; Section 5 (punishment of accessories to offences of causing or attempting to cause explosions or making or possessing explosives) in a case where the offender is convicted on or after the day on which section 15 of the Counter-Terrorism and Sentencing Act 2021 comes into force.
Infant Life (Preservation) Act 1929	Section 1 (child destruction)
Children and Young Persons Act 1933	Section 1 (cruelty to children)
Infanticide Act 1938	Section 1 (infanticide)
Firearms Act 1968	Section 16 (possession of firearm with intent to endanger life); Section 16A (possession of firearm with intent to cause fear of violence); Section 17(1) (use of firearm to resist arrest); Section 17(2) (possession of firearm at time of committing or being arrested for offence specified in Schedule 1 to that Act); Section 18 (carrying a firearm with criminal intent).
Theft Act 1968	Section 8 (robbery or assault with intent to rob); Section 9, where the offence is burglary with intent to—; (i)inflict grievous bodily harm on a person, or (ii)do unlawful damage to a building or anything in it; Section 10 (aggravated burglary); Section 12A (aggravated vehicle-taking), where the offence involves an accident which caused the death of any person.
Criminal Damage Act 1971	Section 1 (arson); Section 1(2) (destroying or damaging property), other than an offence of arson
Biological Weapons Act 1974	Section 1 (developing certain biological agents and toxins or biological weapons) in a case where the offender is convicted on or after the day on which section 15 of the Counter-Terrorism and Sentencing Act 2021 comes into force.
Taking of Hostages Act 1982	Section 1 (hostage-taking)
Aviation Security Act 1982	Section 1 (hijacking); Section 2 (destroying, damaging or endangering safety of aircraft); Section 3 (other acts endangering or likely to endanger safety of aircraft); Section 4 (offences in relation to certain dangerous articles).; Section 6(2) (inducing or assisting the commission of offences relating to safety of aircraft) in a case where the offender is convicted on or after the day on which section 15 of the Counter-Terrorism and Sentencing Act 2021 comes into force.]
Nuclear Material (Offences) Act 1983	Section 1B (offences relating to damage to the environment) in a case where the offender is convicted on or after the day on which section 15 of the Counter-Terrorism and Sentencing Act 2021 comes into force; Section 2 (preparatory acts and threats) in a case where the offender is convicted on or after the day on which section 15 of the Counter-Terrorism and Sentencing Act 2021 comes into force
Mental Health Act 1983	Section 127 (ill-treatment of patients)
Prohibition of Female Circumcision Act 1985	Section 1 (prohibition of female circumcision).
Public Order Act 1986	Section 1 (riot); Section 2 (violent disorder); Section 3 (affray)
Criminal Justice Act 1988	Section 134 (torture)
Road Traffic Act 1988	Section 1 (causing death by dangerous driving); Section 3ZC (causing death by driving: disqualified drivers); Section 3A (causing death by careless driving when under influence of drink or drugs).
Aviation and Maritime Security Act 1990	Section 1 (endangering safety at aerodromes); Section 9 (hijacking of ships); Section 10 (seizing or exercising control of fixed platforms); Section 11 (destroying fixed platforms or endangering their safety); Section 12 (other acts endangering or likely to endanger safe navigation); Section 13 (offences involving threats); Section 14(4) (inducing or assisting the commission of offences relating to hijacking of ships, or destroying ships or fixed platforms or endangering their safety) in a case where the offender is convicted on or after the day on which section 15 of the Counter-Terrorism and Sentencing Act 2021 comes into force.]
Channel Tunnel (Security) Order 1994 (S.I. 1994/570)	Part 2 (offences relating to Channel Tunnel trains and the tunnel system)
Chemical Weapons Act 1996	Section 2 (use etc of chemical weapons); in a case where the offender is convicted on or after the day on which section 15 of the Counter-Terrorism and Sentencing Act 2021 comes into force; Section 11 (premises or equipment used for producing chemical weapons) in a case where the offender is convicted on or after the day on which section 15 of the Counter-Terrorism and Sentencing Act 2021 comes into force
Protection from Harassment Act 1997	Section 4 or 4A (putting people in fear of violence and stalking involving fear of violence or serious alarm or distress)
Crime and Disorder Act 1998	Section 29 (racially or religiously aggravated assaults); Section 31(1)(a) or (b) (racially or religiously aggravated offences under section 4 or 4A of the Public Order Act 1986)
International Criminal Court Act 2001	Section 51 or 52 (genocide, crimes against humanity, war crimes and related offences), other than one involving murder
Anti-Terrorism, Crime and Security Act 2001	Section 47 (use etc of nuclear weapons); Section 50 (assisting or inducing certain weapons-related acts overseas)
Female Genital Mutilation Act 2003	Section 1 (female genital mutilation); Section 2 (assisting a girl to mutilate her own genitalia); Section 3 (assisting a non-UK person to mutilate overseas a girl's genitalia)
Domestic Violence, Crime and Victims Act 2004	Section 5 (causing or allowing a child or vulnerable adult to die or suffer serious physical harm)
Serious Crime Act 2015	Section 75A (strangulation or suffocation)
Modern Slavery Act 2015	Section 1 (slavery, servitude and forced or compulsory labour); Section 2 (human trafficking) which is not within Part 2 of the Schedule of the Sentencing Act 2020)

=== Sexual offences ===
Act	Section and Offence
Sexual Offences Act 1956	Section 1 (rape); Section 2 (procurement of woman by threats); Section 3 (procurement of woman by false pretences); Section 4 (administering drugs to obtain or facilitate intercourse); Section 5 (intercourse with girl under 13); Section 6 (intercourse with girl under 16); Section 7 (intercourse with a defective); Section 9 (procurement of a defective); Section 10 or 11 (incest); Section 14 (indecent assault on a woman); Section 15 (indecent assault on a man); Section 16 (assault with intent to commit buggery); Section 17 (abduction of woman by force or for the sake of her property); Section 19 (abduction of unmarried girl under 18 from parent or guardian); Section 20 (abduction of unmarried girl under 16 from parent or guardian); Section 21 (abduction of defective from parent or guardian); Section 22 (causing prostitution of women); Section 23 (procuration of girl under 21); Section 24 (detention of woman in brothel); Section 25 (permitting girl under 13 to use premises for intercourse; Section 26 (permitting girl under 16 to use premises for intercourse); Section 27 (permitting defective to use premises for intercourse); Section 28 (causing or encouraging prostitution of, intercourse with, or indecent assault on, girl under 16); Section 29 (causing or encouraging prostitution of defective); Section 32 (soliciting by men); Section 33A (keeping a brothel used for prostitution)
Mental Health Act 1959	Section 128 (sexual intercourse with patients)
Indecency with Children Act 1960	Section 1 (indecent conduct towards young child)
Sexual Offences Act 1967	Section 4 (procuring others to commit homosexual acts); Section 5 (living on earnings of male prostitution).
Theft Act 1968	Section 9 (burglary with intent to commit rape)
Criminal Law Act 1977	Section 54 (inciting girl under 16 to have incestuous sexual intercourse)
Protection of Children Act 1978	Section 1 (indecent photographs of children)
Customs and Excise Management Act 1979	Section 170 (penalty for fraudulent evasion of duty etc) in relation to goods prohibited to be imported under section 42 of the Customs Consolidation Act 1876 (39 & 40 Vict. c. 36) (indecent or obscene articles).
Criminal Justice Act 1988	Section 160 (possession of indecent photograph of a child)
Sexual Offences Act 2003	Section 1 (rape); Section 2 (assault by penetration); Section 3 (sexual assault); Section 4 (causing a person to engage in sexual activity without consent); Section 5 (rape of a child under 13); Section 6 (assault of a child under 13 by penetration); Section 7 (sexual assault of a child under 13); Section 8 (causing or inciting a child under 13 to engage in sexual activity); Section 9 (sexual activity with a child); Section 10 (causing or inciting a child to engage in sexual activity); Section 11 (engaging in sexual activity in the presence of a child); Section 12 (causing a child to watch a sexual act); Section 13 (child sex offences committed by children or young persons); Section 14 (arranging or facilitating commission of a child sex offence); Section 15 (meeting a child following sexual grooming etc); Section 15A (sexual communication with a child); Section 16 (abuse of position of trust: sexual activity with a child); Section 17 (abuse of position of trust: causing or inciting a child to engage in sexual activity); Section 18 (abuse of position of trust: sexual activity in the presence of a child); Section 19 (abuse of position of trust: causing a child to watch a sexual act); Section 25 (sexual activity with a child family member); Section 26 (inciting a child family member to engage in sexual activity); Section 30 (sexual activity with a person with a mental disorder impeding choice); Section 31 (causing or inciting a person with a mental disorder impeding choice to engage in sexual activity); Section 32 (engaging in sexual activity in the presence of a person with a mental disorder impeding choice); Section 33 (causing a person with a mental disorder impeding choice to watch a sexual act); Section 34 (inducement, threat or deception to procure sexual activity with a person with a mental disorder); Section 35 (causing a person with a mental disorder to engage in or agree to engage in sexual activity by inducement, threat or deception); Section 36 (engaging in sexual activity in the presence, procured by inducement, threat or deception, of a person with a mental disorder); Section 37 (causing a person with a mental disorder to watch a sexual act by inducement, threat or deception); Section 38 (care workers: sexual activity with a person with a mental disorder); Section 39 (care workers: causing or inciting sexual activity); Section 40 (care workers: sexual activity in the presence of a person with a mental disorder); Section 41 (care workers: causing a person with a mental disorder to watch a sexual act); Section 47 (paying for sexual services of a child); Section 48 (causing or inciting sexual exploitation of a child); Section 49 (controlling a child in relation to sexual exploitation); Section 50 (arranging or facilitating sexual exploitation of a child); Section 52 (causing or inciting prostitution for gain); Section 53 (controlling prostitution for gain); Section 57 (trafficking into the UK for sexual exploitation); Section 58 (trafficking within the UK for sexual exploitation); Section 59 (trafficking out of the UK for sexual exploitation); Section 59A (trafficking for sexual exploitation); Section 61 (administering a substance with intent); Section 62 (committing an offence with intent to commit a sexual offence); Section 63 (trespass with intent to commit a sexual offence); Section 64 (sex with an adult relative: penetration); Section 65 (sex with an adult relative: consenting to penetration); Section 66 (exposure); Section 66A (sending etc photograph or film of genitals); Section 66B(2) (sharing intimate photograph or film with intent to cause alarm, distress or humiliation); Section 66B(3) (sharing intimate photograph or film for purpose of obtaining sexual gratification); Section 67 (voyeurism); Section 69 (intercourse with an animal); Section 70 (sexual penetration of a corpse).
Modern Slavery Act 2015	Section 2 (human trafficking) committed with a view to exploitation that consists of or includes behaviour within section 3(3) of that Act (sexual exploitation)

=== Terrorism offences ===
Act	Section and Offence
Terrorism Act 2000	Section 11 (membership of a proscribed organisation); Section 12 (inviting support for a proscribed organisation); Section 54 (weapons training); Section 56 (directing terrorist organisation); Section 57 (possession of article for terrorist purposes); Section 58 (collection of information likely to be of use to a terrorist); Section 58A (publishing information about members of the armed forces); Section 58B (entering or remaining in a designated area); Section 59 (inciting terrorism overseas).
Anti-Terrorism, Crime and Security Act 2001	Section 113 (use of noxious substance or thing to cause harm or intimidate)
Terrorism Act 2006	Section 1 (encouragement of terrorism); Section 2 (dissemination of terrorist publications); Section 5 (preparation of terrorist acts); Section 6 (training for terrorism); Section 8 (attendance at a place used for terrorist training); Section 9 (making or possession of radioactive device or material); Section 10 (misuse of radioactive device or material for terrorist purposes etc); Section 11 (terrorist threats relating to radioactive devices etc).

== Parole ==
A prisoner who has served their minimum term becomes eligible for parole. If the Parole Board for England and Wales agrees to release a prisoner who was sentenced to life, they are released on a life licence (Welsh: trwydded oes) meaning that they will remain on parole for the remainder of their natural life. Prisoners who break the conditions of their release, or who are found to be a danger to the public, can be immediately returned to prison for an indefinite period under the terms of this licence.

In England and Wales, the average life sentence that prisoners serve is around 15–20 years before being paroled, although those convicted of exceptionally grave crimes remain behind bars for considerably longer; Ian Huntley was given a minimum term of 40 years. He died in March 2026 after being attacked by another prisoner, 16 years before he could apply for parole.

Some receive whole life orders, which make it almost certain that they will die in prison; they can only be considered for release if their sentence is reduced on appeal by the High Court of Justice, or in exceptional circumstances including great age or ill health.

By 2015, there were an estimated 60 prisoners in England and Wales serving such sentences, issued by either the High Court or the Home Office. A number of prisoners have died in prison when serving such sentences including "The Yorkshire Ripper" Peter Sutcliffe, Moors Murderers (Ian Brady and Myra Hindley), as well as serial killer GP Harold Shipman who committed suicide four years into his sentence.

For England and Wales, the law regarding release on licence of prisoners is laid out in chapter 2 of the Crime (Sentences) Act 1997 (see in particular sections 28–30). This Act was amended and updated by the Criminal Justice Act 2003 chapters 6 and 7.

For Scotland, the law is set out in the Prisoners and Criminal Proceedings (Scotland) Act 1993, as amended in relation to life prisoners by the Convention Rights (Compliance) (Scotland) Act 2001, which incorporated changes to ensure that the procedure is compliant with the European Convention on Human Rights. The Scottish legal system does not allow a whole life sentence to be issued, but retains other forms of indefinite imprisonment, such as an Order for Lifelong Restriction.

== Minimum term ==
Under the criminal law of England and Wales, a minimum term (formerly "tariff") is the minimum period that a person serving an indefinite sentence must serve before that person becomes eligible for parole. The sentencing judge bears responsibility for setting the minimum term.

The purpose of this mechanism has been described as follows:

The tariff is the minimum period a life sentence prisoner must serve to meet the requirements of retribution and deterrence before being considered for release. After this minimum period has been served release will only take place where the prisoner is judged no longer a risk of harm to the public.

— Hilary Benn, House of Commons Hansard Written Answers for 8 July 2002.

The factors involved in the determination of a tariff were contested in the 1993 case of Robert Thompson and Jon Venables, two 11-year-old boys who were convicted of the murder of two-year-old James Bulger. Although the trial judge initially recommended that the pair would have to serve at least eight years in custody, the High Court later set a minimum term of 10 years. However, in July 1994 the home secretary Michael Howard set a tariff of 15 years, based in part on the public outcry over the murders. The ruling also came shortly after The Sun newspaper petitioned the home secretary with the signatures of thousands of readers for the two killers to receive stiffer sentences.

In June 1997, the House of Lords ruled that Howard had acted unlawfully when setting the 15-year minimum terms. This ruling also signalled the end of the home secretary's powers to set minimum terms for offenders who committed their crimes before the age of 18.

In November 2002, following a European Court of Human Rights ruling that the home secretary could no longer set minimum terms for life sentence prisoners, the High Court stripped the home secretary of his powers to set minimum terms completely. Earlier that year, following a legal challenge by another convicted murderer, Dennis Stafford, the home secretary had also been stripped of his powers to overrule the Parole Board's recommendations that a life sentence prisoner should be granted parole.

Another notable prisoner whose minimum sentence was increased was Myra Hindley, jailed for life in 1966 for her role in the Moors Murders; she was convicted of murdering two children and being an accessory in the murder of a third. Her partner Ian Brady was convicted of all three murders. Their trial judge later recommended to the appropriate authorities that he felt it was unlikely that Brady could ever be rehabilitated and safe to be considered for release, but felt that the same was not true of Hindley once she was removed from Brady's influence, recommending that she should be considered for parole after a period of around 25 years. This ruling was endorsed by at least one home secretary and High Court judge, but after the pair confessed to two more murders in 1986, Hindley's minimum term was increased to 30 years and then replaced by a whole life tariff in 1990, although she was not informed of the decision until 1994 – following a High Court ruling that the home secretary was obliged to inform all life sentence prisoners when or if they could be considered for parole. This was despite reports by Parole Board and prison officials that stated that Hindley should be considered for parole or at least for a transfer to an open prison as a possible prelude to parole in the near future.

Lord Longford and David Astor, two high-profile supporters of Hindley, backed her campaign for parole, and claimed that a succession of home secretaries was keeping her in prison in an attempt to win votes for their respective governments, as well as shying away from an inevitable tabloid media backlash that would accompany lost votes for any government whose home secretary failed to block Hindley's release from prison. Some sources also claimed that Hindley was being kept in prison for her own safety more than to protect the public from any risk she might pose, as she had received numerous death threats from relatives of the Moors Murders victims and from members of the public pledging to kill her if she was ever set free. Hindley lodged three appeals against her whole life tariff, but all three appeals were unsuccessful and she remained in prison until her death in November 2002, just over a week before the home secretary was stripped of his powers to set minimum terms for life sentence prisoners. This ruling had been in the pipeline for several months, and the national media had reported that the ruling could soon result in Hindley being freed.

With the death of Hindley, the home secretary had lost perhaps the most high-profile prisoner in the prison system, whose minimum term had been increased by a succession of home secretaries, leaving him with limited time to select new high-profile prisoners to impose heavy sentences on. Some of these factors were used as grounds to appeal in June 2010 when Roy Whiting—one of those whose sentences were increased—successfully appealed to have his sentence reduced in the High Court.

A similar system operates in Scotland, whereby the trial judge fixes a "punishment part" to "satisfy the requirements of retribution and deterrence". The prisoner cannot be considered for parole until this punishment part is served.

For example, for a murder, someone may be given a life sentence with a minimum term of 15 years. This means they cannot be released on parole until the minimum term is served. Some prisoners serve considerably longer than the minimum term recommended by the trial judge – even if it was later reaffirmed or reduced by a home secretary or by the High Court. A notable example is Harry Roberts, jailed for life in 1966 for his role in the murder of three policemen in London. His trial judge recommended that he serve at least 30 years before being considered for parole, but he was not granted parole until 2014, by which time he had served 48 years in prison. This was due to the decisions of the Parole Board rather than Home Secretaries or High Court judges. Roberts died 11 years after being paroled.

== Starting points for murder ==
The terms below are only guidelines for adults, and starting points vary in different legal cases. Starting points may either be increased or decreased depending on aggravating and/or mitigating factors respectively. The guidelines are currently in Schedule 21 of the Sentencing Act 2020.

However, the law still states that life sentence prisoners (and prisoners issued with fixed-term prison sentences) who have been convicted of crimes committed before the Criminal Justice Act 2003 came into force (18 December 2003) are sentenced according to guidelines which existed when the crime was committed.

Type of murder	Starting point
Where the court considers that the seriousness of the offence (or the combination of the offence and one or more offences associated with it) is exceptionally high. Cases that would normally fall within the above include: Murder of two or more persons where each murder involves substantial premeditation, abduction or sexual or sadistic conduct.; Murder of a child involving sexual or sadistic conduct, or abduction of the victim, or a substantial degree of premeditation or planning.; Murder committed to further a religious, political, racial or ideological cause.; Murder committed by a person previously convicted of murder.; Murder of a police or prison officer while the victim was acting in the execution of their duty (from 13 April 2015).	Whole-life order, where (1) the offender is aged 21 or over at the time of the offence, or; (2) the offender is aged between 18 and 20 at the time of the offence AND if the Court considers that the seriousness of the offence, or combination of offences, is exceptionally high even by the standard of offences which would normally result in a whole life order where the offender is aged 21 or over, AND the offence was committed on or after the day on which section 126 of the Police, Crime, Sentencing and Courts Act 2022 came into force. 30 years, where (1) the offender is aged under 18 at the time of the offence, or; (2) the offender is aged between 18 and 20 at the time of the offence but the Court does not consider that the seriousness of the offence, or combination of offences, is exceptionally high even by the standard of offences which would normally result in a whole life order for an offender aged 21 or over.
Where the court considers that the seriousness of the offence (or the combination of the offence and one or more offences associated with it) is particularly high. Cases that would normally fall within the above include: Murder committed using a firearm or explosive.; Murder committed for personal gain (such as during a robbery or burglary).; Murder committed to obstruct the course of justice.; Murder involving sexual or sadistic conduct.; Murder of two or more persons.; Racially, sexually, or religiously aggravated murder.; (In Griffiths and others v R (2012) the Court of Appeal said that this list is not exhaustive.)	30 years, where the offender is aged 18 or over at the time of the offence 27 years, where the offender is aged 17 at the time of the offence 20 years, where the offender is aged 15 or 16 at the time of the offence 15 years, where the offender is aged 14 or under at the time of the offence
Murder committed using a knife or other weapon, which was taken by the defendant to the scene of the murder, intending to commit any offence or to have it available as a weapon.	25 years, where the offender is aged 18 or over at the time of the offence 23 years, where the offender is aged 17 at the time of the offence 17 years, where the offender is aged 15 or 16 at the time of the offence 13 years, where the offender is aged 14 or under at the time of the offence
Other murder committed on or after the day on which section 127 of the Police, Crime, Sentencing and Courts Act 2022 came into force.	15 years, where the offender is aged 18 or over at the time of the offence 14 years, where the offender is aged 17 at the time of the offence 10 years, where the offender is aged 15 or 16 at the time of the offence 8 years, where the offender is aged 14 or under at the time of the offence
Any murder committed by a person under 18 and where the offender was convicted of the offence before the day on which section 127 of the Police, Crime, Sentencing and Courts Act 2022 came into force.	12 years

== Whole life order ==
A whole life order (formerly known as a whole life tariff) is a court order whereby a prisoner who is being sentenced to life imprisonment is ordered to serve that sentence without any possibility of parole or conditional release. This order may be made in cases of aggravated murders committed by anyone who was aged 21 or above at the time of the crime; or where the offender was aged between 18 and 20 if the Court considers that the seriousness of the offence, or combination of offences, is exceptionally high even by the standard of offences which would normally result in a whole-life order where the offender is aged 21 or over. The purpose of a whole-life order is for a prisoner to spend the rest of their life in prison, although they may still be released on compassionate grounds (see compassionate release) or pardoned by the monarch, within the royal prerogative of mercy – namely in the event of great age or ill health.

Since the abolition of the death penalty in 1965, it is the most serious criminal penalty that can be imposed for any crime in the United Kingdom.

A whole-life order can also be quashed on appeal by the Court of Appeal; a number of prisoners have had their sentences reduced by this method. From 1983, the home secretary had the right to decide how long a life-sentence prisoner should serve before being considered for parole, and the trial judge was not obliged to recommend when or if an offender should be considered for parole. In some cases, the trial judge had recommended that a life-sentence prisoner should at some point be considered for parole, only for the home secretary to later impose a whole life order, while in other cases the trial judge recommended that a life sentence prisoner should never be released, only for a Home Secretary or the High Court to later rule that they could be considered for parole after serving a specified minimum sentence.

The question of whether a home secretary or any of the other appropriate authorities should have the power to impose whole life orders was a controversial one, since a decision to impose such a sanction (or not) could carry political consequences for the home secretary and, by extension, the government they served – as well as a backlash by the national media. Perhaps the most notable example is Myra Hindley, sentenced to life in prison in 1966 for her role in the Moors Murders. Her trial judge recommended that she should serve a minimum of 25 years before being considered for parole. However, this was later increased to 30 years and in 1990 to "whole life" by David Waddington. Supporters of her campaign for parole, most notably Lord Longford and David Astor, argued that she was being kept in prison by successive home secretaries afraid of going against public opinion. She died in November 2002, having never managed to win parole; on three occasions she had appealed against the Home Office's ruling that she should never be released, but each of these appeals failed.

The introduction of the government's tariff-setting procedures in 1983 also came shortly after a number of widely reported murder convictions, which sparked public and media fears that the convicted murderers could be paroled within the next decade or so. That year had seen the arrest and conviction of Dennis Nilsen, who was jailed for life for murdering 11 young men whose dismembered bodies were found at the two flats he had rented in North London. Two years earlier, "Yorkshire Ripper" Peter Sutcliffe had been found guilty of murdering 13 women and attacking seven others in a six-year spree. Both killers were later issued with whole life tariffs and remained in prison until their deaths; Nielsen dying in 2018 after 35 years in prison, and Sutcliffe in 2020 after serving almost 40 years in various prisons and mental hospitals.

In 1976, Donald "Black Panther" Neilson was convicted on four charges of murder at the end of a highly publicised trial. He too was subjected to a whole-life order by subsequent home secretaries, with the final decision on his sentencing coming in 2008 when the High Court reaffirmed the decision. Like Nilsen and Sutcliffe, Neilson remained in prison until his death in 2011 after serving 35 years of his life sentence.

In November 2002, a successful legal challenge by convicted double murderer Anthony Anderson saw the home secretary stripped of the final say on how long a life sentence prisoner must serve before parole can be considered, including the right to decide that certain prisoners should never be released. This ruling had been anticipated for several months, and was delivered just over a week after the death of Hindley, who had been widely expected to gain immediate parole in the event of the home secretary's being stripped of these sentencing powers.

A year later, the Criminal Justice Act 2003 was passed requiring that the trial judge recommend the minimum number of years to be served (or order that life should mean life) in the case of anyone being sentenced to life imprisonment. As had been the case when the home secretary could determine when or if a life sentence prisoner could be considered for parole, prisoners were entitled to have their sentence reviewed by the High Court. These prisoners can also appeal to the European Court of Human Rights (ECtHR) if their appeals to the High Court are unsuccessful.

In June 1997, the High Court had already stripped the home secretary of the power to decide on minimum terms for life-sentence prisoners who were convicted before the age of 18, following a legal challenge by solicitors acting for Robert Thompson and Jon Venables. The pair had been found guilty of murdering Merseyside toddler James Bulger in 1993, when they were 11 years old. The trial judge's initial recommendation was that they should not be considered for parole for at least eight years. The Lord Chief Justice later ruled that the pair should serve a minimum sentence of 10 years, but in 1994, following a petition by The Sun newspaper, Home Secretary Michael Howard ruled that the pair should not be released until they had spent at least 15 years in custody.

Many prisoners have also received minimum sentences that are expected to keep them imprisoned for most if not all of their remaining lives, such as child killer Roy Whiting, who was convicted of child murder and received a 40-year minimum term, which means that he cannot apply for parole until he is at least 82. Whiting's trial judge had originally recommended that life should mean life and just before the High Court stripped politicians of their sentencing powers in November 2002, Home Secretary David Blunkett set Whiting's minimum term at 50 years, which was effectively a whole-life order as it meant that he could apply for parole only if he lived to be at least 92. Whiting lodged an appeal against this ruling to the High Court, and the order was reduced to a 40-year minimum term, meaning that Whiting could be considered for parole from 2041 and the age of 82. Another child killer, Ian Huntley, murdered two 10-year-old girls in August 2002, but by the time he was convicted 16 months later, the home secretary had been stripped of powers to set minimum terms for life sentence prisoners, and that decision was instead left to the High Court. His 40-year minimum sentence would have kept him imprisoned until 2042 and the age of 68; however, Huntley died in 2026 after being attacked in prison.

Between 1997 and 2000, Myra Hindley made three appeals against the ruling that life should mean life in her case, but each was unsuccessful. The appropriate authorities initially agreed with the 25-year-minimum term suggested by the trial judge, but was later increased to 30 years by the home secretary in the mid-1980s and then to "whole life" by successive home secretaries from 1990. She remained in prison until her death in November 2002, 36 years after she was sentenced. Her campaign for parole was supported by Lord Longford and David Astor, who claimed that she was a reformed character who had merely acted as Brady's accomplice under duress, and had completely changed once removed from his influence. Her supporters also claimed that successive home secretaries refused to authorise her release from prison in order to win votes.

However, there was widespread public and media objection to Hindley ever being paroled. She received numerous death threats from members of the public – including the relatives of some of the Moors Murders victims – who vowed to kill her if she was ever released from prison. The public and media doubt as to whether Hindley's remorse was genuine was further fuelled by the fact that Hindley had waited 20 years before making a full confession. This for many further strengthened the suggestion that the reported turnaround in her life while in prison was nothing more than a ploy to boost her chances of parole.

Ian Brady, who committed the Moors murders with Hindley, was also told by a succession of home secretaries that his life sentence should mean life, but unlike Hindley he never attempted to gain parole, and insisted he never wanted to be released from custody. In 1999, he made an unsuccessful legal challenge to be allowed to starve himself to death. He died in May 2017 after more than 50 years in prison, and was Britain's longest-serving prisoner.

Prior to 2022, the law provided that whole-life orders could be issued to anyone under the age of 21 at the time of their crime, although there had never been a previous case of a whole-life order being imposed or recommended to someone who committed their crime before the age of 21. The Police, Crime, Sentencing and Courts Act 2022 amended the Sentencing Code to allow a court to issue whole-life orders to defendants aged over 18 but under 21 at the time of their offence, but only if the court considers that the seriousness of the offence, or combination of offences, is exceptionally high even by the standard of offences which would normally result in a whole life order.

A number of prisoners who are unlikely ever to be released or have received very long sentences have declared their wish to die; for example, Ian Brady. At least two such inmates have committed suicide in prison, Harold Shipman and Daniel Gonzalez, and there have been attempted suicides by such prisoners, including Ian Huntley. A number have died in prison as a result of ill health, including Myra Hindley and Donald Neilson.

Whole-life sentences have also been criticised in some quarters for giving offenders no incentive to behave well and co-operate with prison staff, or make any serious attempt at rehabilitation. An example of this was highlighted by the case of Robert Maudsley, sentenced to life for a single murder in 1975, who went on to kill three inmates several years into his sentence. The late Victor Castgador also went on to kill again in prison. A number of other such prisoners have committed serious assaults on other prisoners and staff. These include Mark Hobson, Gary Vinter and Damien Bendall.

=== Release ===
Section 30(1) of the Crime (Sentences) Act 1997 provides that the home secretary may at any time release a life prisoner on licence if satisfied that exceptional circumstances exist that justify the prisoner’s release on compassionate grounds. A prisoner can then be released early when criteria such as great age, injury, disability or ill health are met; this has resulted in several life-sentence prisoners being granted early release a considerable length of time before the date when they could first apply for parole.

Only the home secretary can grant a release to a prisoner sentenced to a whole-life order on compassionate grounds including great age or ill health. Only four prisoners known or believed to have been issued with a whole-life order have so far been released from their sentences. Three of them were IRA members who were freed under the Good Friday Agreement in 1999, having spent more than 20 years in prison for terrorist offences including murder. The other was gang member Reggie Kray, who was freed from his life sentence in August 2000 after serving 32 years (two years after the expiry of his original 30-year minimum term) due to terminal cancer; although the Home Office never confirmed that he had been issued with a whole-life order, his lengthy imprisonment and the fact that he was not paroled when his tariff expired (despite being well into his sixties) fuelled speculation that he was among the prisoners who had been issued with a whole-life order. He died a few weeks after being freed.

=== Legal challenges against whole-life orders ===
Three convicted murderers – Jeremy Bamber, Peter Moore and Douglas Vinter, all of whom had been sentenced to whole-life orders – applied to the European Court of Human Rights in Strasbourg for the court to declare that it is a breach of a person's rights under Article 3 of the European Convention on Human Rights for them to be sentenced to lifelong imprisonment. When the initial ruling was delivered in January 2012, the court ruled that because the whole-life orders were imposed by a judge only after consideration of the facts of each case, and because the life prisoners could apply to the home secretary for compassionate release, their whole-life orders did not breach their human rights.

A later appeal by the same men led to a ruling in July 2013 that there must be a prospect of review of whole life orders within 25 years of the sentence being issued, and that any impossibility of parole would violate their Article 3 rights. By this stage there were at least 49 prisoners serving such sentences in England and Wales.

In February 2014, five judges at the Court of Appeal found the Strasbourg court was incorrect in concluding that the law of England and Wales never allowed whole-life orders to be reduced because the Secretary of State could reduce such orders in "exceptional circumstances", and that all "whole-life" prisoners would be entitled to a review of their sentence within 25 years of being sentenced. The whole-life order in the United Kingdom is therefore in fact not really life imprisonment without parole, but it is close to it. Lord Chief Justice Lord Thomas said whole life orders were compatible with the European Convention on Human Rights (ECHR) in the most appalling cases of murder. Thomas said further, "Judges should therefore continue as they have done to impose whole-life orders in those rare and exceptional cases. ... In our judgment the law of England and Wales therefore does provide to an offender 'hope' or the 'possibility' of release in exceptional circumstances which render the just punishment originally imposed no longer justifiable." Barrister Edward Fitzgerald said that whole-life prisoners since 2014 "are in a sort of limbo. In legal theory they have the right to a review after say 25 or 30 years in the light of their progress. But in actual practice there is no recognition of this fact in any policy statement by the Secretary for Justice and no real means of knowing what it is they must do to win release even after decades in custody".

In February 2015, the ECtHR upheld the lawfulness of whole-life orders, on the ground that they can be reviewed in exceptional circumstances, following a fresh challenge by murderer Arthur Hutchinson, who had been sentenced to life imprisonment for a triple murder in Sheffield more than 30 years earlier. Another legal challenge to the court by Hutchinson was rejected in January 2017. By this stage, there were believed to be more than 70 prisoners in England and Wales serving whole-life sentences.
