= Anthony Anderson (murderer) =

British murderer

- Criminal charges: Double charge of murder
- Criminal penalty: 1988: Sentenced at trial to life imprisonment without possibility of parole for 15 years; 1994: Parole eligibility changed to 20 years by Home Secretary; 2002: Reverted to original parole eligibility when Home Secretary stripped of sentencing powers

Anthony Anderson is a British convicted murderer who is most notable for successfully challenging the home secretary's powers to set minimum terms for life sentence prisoners.

== Murders ==
Anderson's first victim, 60-year-old Thomas Walker, suffered a heart attack and died after being punched and kicked by Anderson during a burglary in September 1986. Anderson's next victim was 35-year-old Michael Tierney, who died in May 1987, having also been killed by Anderson in a burglary.

Anderson was sentenced to life imprisonment in 1988 on two charges of murder. The trial judge, in issuing the life sentence, recommended that Anderson should serve a minimum of 15 years before being considered for parole, which would keep him in prison until at least 2003.

Six years after Anderson's trial, Home Secretary Michael Howard increased Anderson's minimum term to 20 years, meaning that he would now have to wait until at least 2008 before release could be even considered.

== Legal appeals and landmark ruling ==
In February 2001, Anderson had tried to challenge the Home Secretary's tariff-setting powers, but his case failed.

On 25 November 2002, the Appellate Committee of the House of Lords ruled in favour of Anderson's claim that it was incompatible with human rights for politicians to set minimum terms for life sentence prisoners, and the next day the European Court of Human Rights agreed with this decision, meaning that politicians in European countries can no longer decide the minimum length of imprisonment for anyone serving a life sentence.

British politicians had already been stripped of their powers five years earlier to set minimum terms for prisoners aged under 18 after the High Court ruled that the same Home Secretary, Michael Howard, had acted unlawfully by deciding that the juvenile killers of toddler James Bulger should spend at least 15 years in custody.

Anderson's successful challenge was a test case which affected approximately 225 convicted British murderers who had been given recommended minimum terms at their trial, only for the term to be increased by a Home Secretary at a later date.
