= HM Prison Camp Hill =

Former prison near Newport, Isle of Wight in England

Coordinates: 50°42′43″N 1°18′53″W

HMP Camp Hill
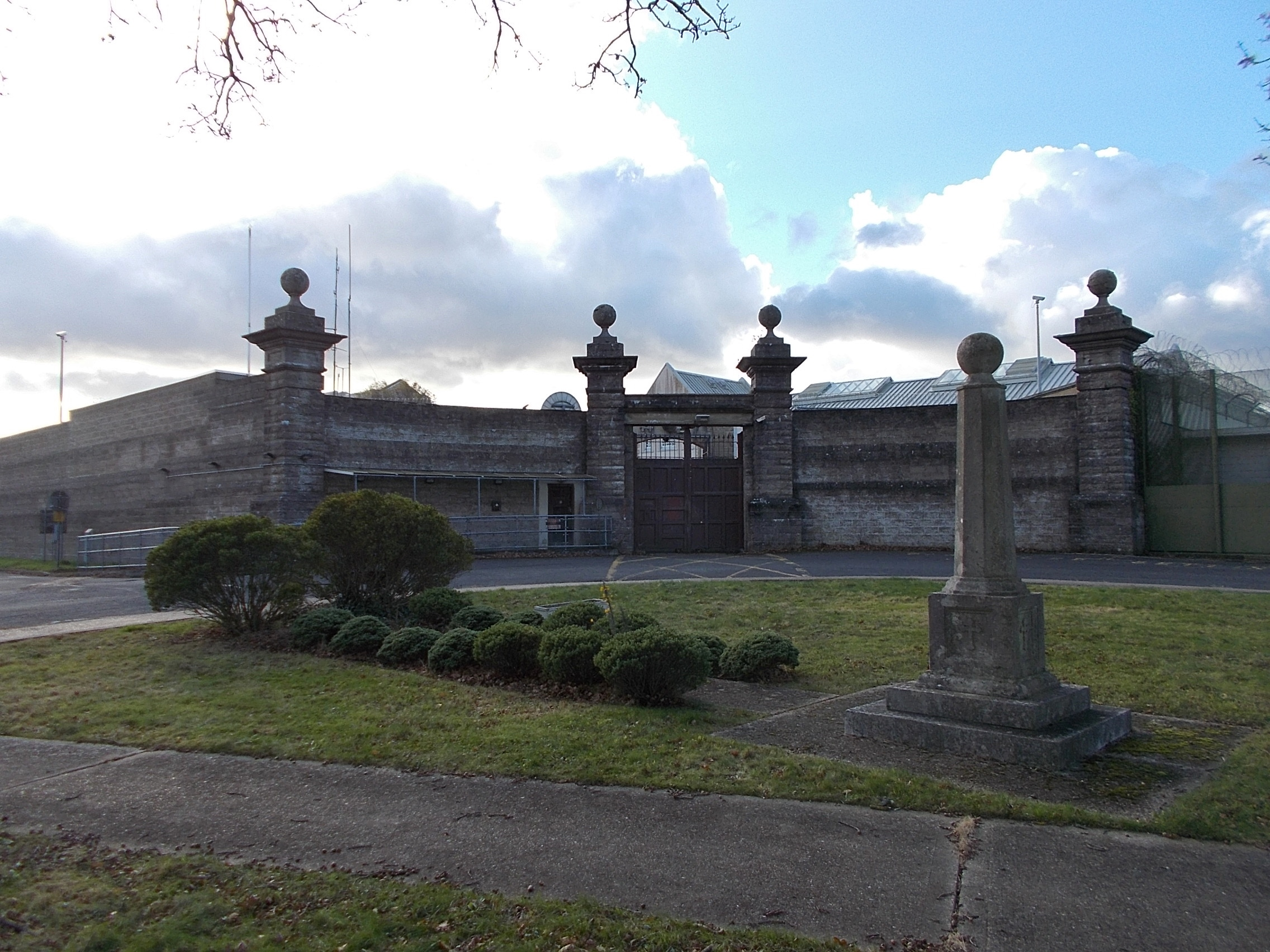
- The entrance to the former prison in 2017
- Interactive map of HMP Camp Hill
- Location: Newport, Isle of Wight
- Status: Closed
- Opened: 1912
- Closed: 2013
- Managed by: HM Prison Services
- Website: Camp Hill at justice.gov.uk

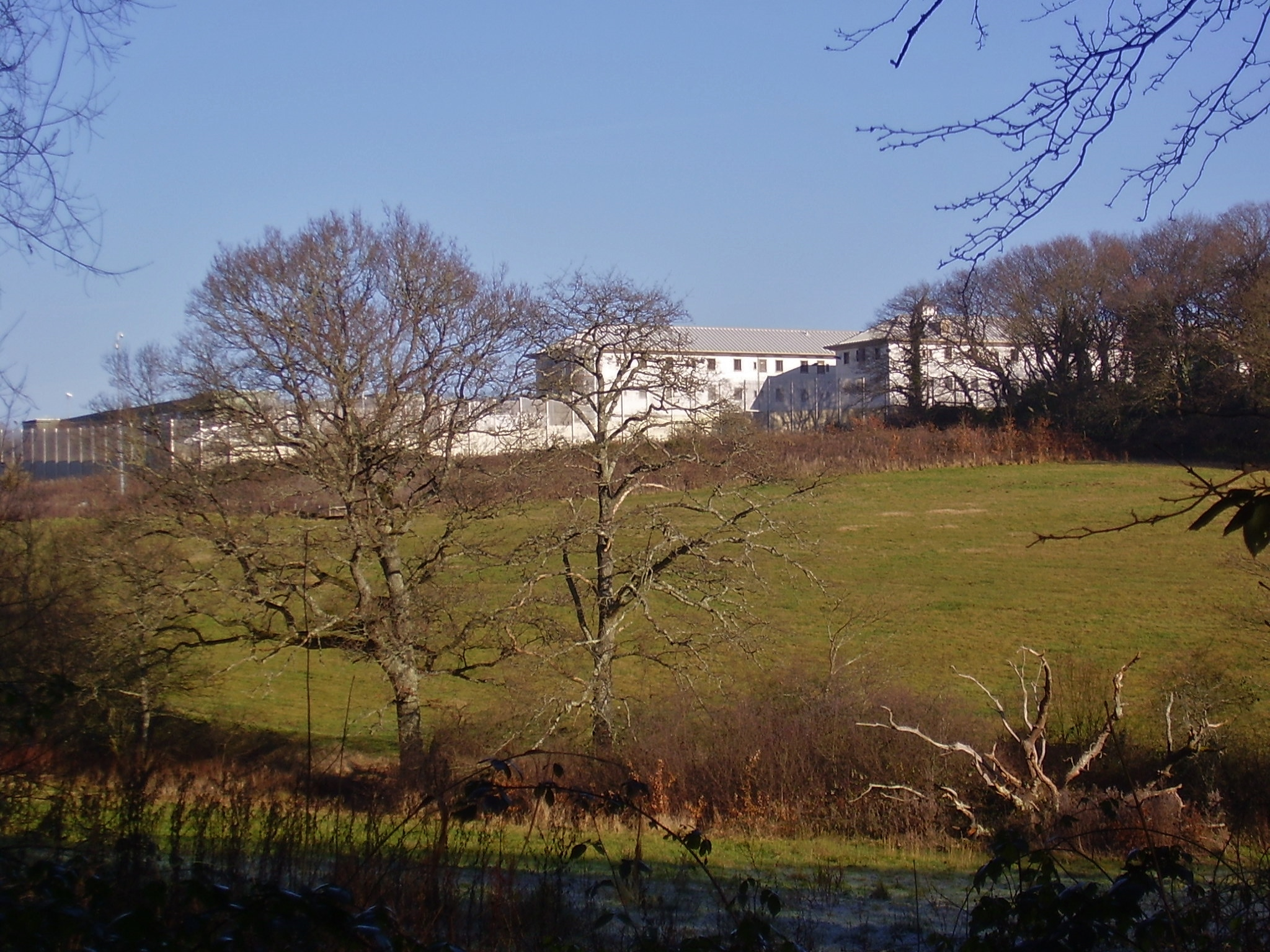
View of the former prison from Parkhurst Forest.

HMP Isle of Wight – Camp Hill Barracks is a former Category C men's prison, located on the outskirts of Newport, Isle of Wight. The former prison lies adjacent to Albany and Parkhurst, both part of HMP Isle of Wight.

== History ==
Camp Hill was built in 1912 using prisoner labour from Parkhurst Prison. Camp Hill was formally opened by Winston Churchill.

In a report in April 2007, Her Majesty's Chief Inspector of Prisons criticised Camp Hill for its lack of a coherent and positive direction, and its failure to improve. Concerns were also raised at the number of inmates not in vocational work at the prison. Camp Hill courted controversy again weeks later, when it emerged an arsonist had been mistakenly released 29 months too early from the prison. The arsonist, Christopher "Buster" Pocock from Ryde, was captured early and was returned to finish his sentence.

In January 2008 a convicted drug dealer refused to leave his cell in Camp Hill for a court appearance. Citing the 1998 Human Rights Act, the prisoner claimed his human rights would be breached if he was forced to leave, due to fears he would lose his cell to another inmate amid an overcrowding crisis at Camp Hill.

In October 2008, it was announced that the name Camp Hill could be lost, along with the two other prison names, Albany and Parkhurst. The three would become part of one large prison run by a single governor. New names for the larger single prison have been suggested as HMP Solent, HMP Mountbatten and HMP Vectis. HMP Isle of Wight was later selected as the new name for the super prison incorporating all three island prisons.

In January 2013 the Government announced the Camp Hill element of HMP Isle of Wight would close as part of a wider reorganisation of prison places. Camp Hill formally closed in March 2013.

The now empty Camp Hill prison site has been said to be earmarked for a large housing development, however the Ministry of Justice still own the site. There is no sign that this site will be offered for housing.
