= Police Dependants' Trust =

Police Care UK
- Formation: December 1966; 59 years ago
- Type: Charity
- Location: United Kingdom
- Website: policecare.org.uk
- Formerly called: Police Dependents' Trust

Police Care UK, formerly the Police Dependants' Trust, is a body which looks after the interest and welfare of the families of British police officers who have died or been incapacitated as a result of injury while on duty.

It was set up in December 1966 from financial donations which flooded in after three CID officers in London were murdered by three men whose car they had stopped for a routine inspection (Shepherd's Bush murders). The initial contributor was holiday camp owner Billy Butlin, who anonymously donated £100,000. Public donations soon swelled the fund to one million pounds.

The three killers were all given life sentences. John Duddy died while imprisoned in Parkhurst prison in February 1981, while John Edward 'Jack' Witney was released on licence in 1991 after 25 years and was later murdered in Bristol in 1999. Harry Roberts was released on licence in November 2014, after serving 48 years.

In 2019, following a merger with the National Police Fund, Police Dependents' Trust became Police Care UK.
