= Parkhurst, Isle of Wight =

Coordinates: 50°43′00″N 1°18′17″W

Parkhurst
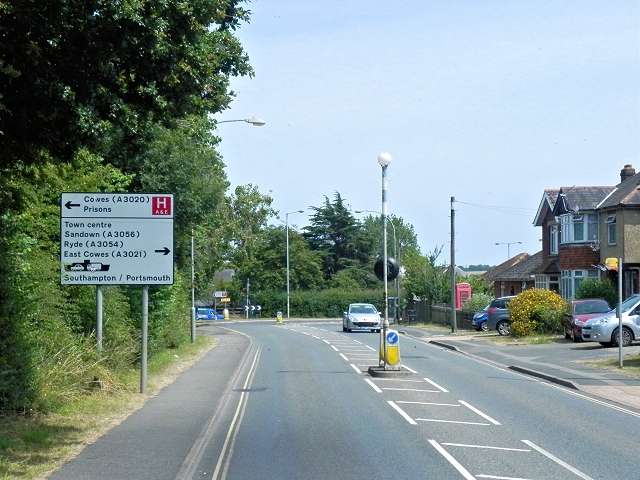
- Forest Road in Parkhurst

- Location within the Isle of Wight
- Population: 5,047 (2011 ward)
- OS grid reference: SZ491910
- Unitary authority: Isle of Wight
- Ceremonial county: Isle of Wight
- Region: South East
- Country: England
- Sovereign state: United Kingdom
- Post town: NEWPORT
- Postcode district: PO30
- Dialling code: 01983
- Police: Hampshire and Isle of Wight
- Fire: Hampshire and Isle of Wight
- Ambulance: Isle of Wight
- UK Parliament: Isle of Wight West

Parkhurst is a neighbourhood northwest of the town of Newport, Isle of Wight. It has few amenities, but a large residential population.

It is notable for housing H.M.P. Isle of Wight, on three sites, formerly three separate prisons: the well-known Parkhurst Prison itself, Camp Hill, and Albany. Parkhurst and Albany were once amongst the few top-security prisons in the United Kingdom but were downgraded in the 1990s.

A number of well-known criminals were accommodated in the Parkhurst prisons, including John Duddy, Graham Young, the Yorkshire Ripper Peter Sutcliffe and the Kray twins.

The prisons caused the construction during the mid 20th century of housing estates to accommodate prison workers and their families, and much of the area is characterised by these poor-quality estates, now largely in private ownership but still in need of repair.

Parkhurst also adjoins Parkhurst Forest, a large Forestry Commission owned woodland which includes plantation woodland and a large area of ancient woodland, and is well used by local people for recreation.

Parkhurst is situated on the A3020 road and is served by frequent buses on Southern Vectis route 1.

== Notable people ==
- Clara Rousby, actress, was born here around 1850.
