= South African cricket team in England in 2012 =

| | England | South Africa |
- Dates: 19 July 2012 – 12 September 2012
| Captains | Andrew Strauss (Tests); Alastair Cook (ODIs); Stuart Broad (T20Is) | Graeme Smith (Tests); AB de Villiers (ODIs & T20Is) |

Test series
- Result: South Africa won the 3-match series 2–0
| Most runs | Matt Prior (275) | Hashim Amla (482) |
| Most wickets | Stuart Broad (11) | Dale Steyn (15) |
- Player of the series: Matt Prior (Eng); Hashim Amla (SA)

One Day International series
- Results: 5-match series drawn 2–2
| Most runs | Ian Bell (181) | Hashim Amla (335) |
| Most wickets | James Anderson (6) | Robin Peterson (7) |
- Player of the series: Hashim Amla (SA)

Twenty20 International series
- Results: 3-match series drawn 1–1
| Most runs | Craig Kieswetter (76) | Hashim Amla (83) |
| Most wickets | Jade Dernbach (3); Steven Finn (3); Graeme Swann (3) | Johan Botha (4) |
- Player of the series: Craig Kieswetter (Eng)

The South African cricket team toured England in 2012 to play three Test matches, five One Day Internationals and three Twenty20 International matches. The number of Test matches between the two nations had to be reduced to avoid clashes with the Olympic Games.

Similarly to South Africa's previous tour of England in 2008, South Africa won the series, and the England captain subsequently resigned (in 2008, Michael Vaughan resigned from the captaincy, and subsequently was never picked to play again; in 2012, Andrew Strauss resigned both the captaincy and from all forms of cricket).

== Preparations ==
The South Africa squad spent four days with explorer Mike Horn in Switzerland before the tour began. Horn and South Africa head coach Gary Kirsten had worked together during India's successful 2011 Cricket World Cup campaign. Horn's training focused on putting the team through physical exertion to improve their mental strength. Several members of the squad, including Mark Boucher and Dale Steyn, recalled the training period as being the toughest few days of their lives. He worked with the team again as a "special assistant" for further training before the third Test.

== Squads ==
| Tests | | ODIs | | T20Is | |
| England | South Africa | England | South Africa | England | South Africa |
|---|---|---|---|---|---|
| Andrew Strauss (c); James Anderson; Jonny Bairstow; Ian Bell; Ravi Bopara; Tim Bresnan; Stuart Broad; Alastair Cook; Steven Finn; Graham Onions; Kevin Pietersen; Matt Prior (wk); Graeme Swann; James Taylor; Jonathan Trott | Graeme Smith (c); AB de Villiers (vc & wk); Hashim Amla; Mark Boucher (wk); Marchant de Lange; JP Duminy; Imran Tahir; Jacques Kallis; Morné Morkel; Alviro Petersen; Robin Peterson; Vernon Philander; Jacques Rudolph; Dale Steyn; Thami Tsolekile (wk) ^{1}; Lonwabo Tsotsobe | Alastair Cook (c); James Anderson; Jonny Bairstow; Ian Bell; Ravi Bopara; Tim Bresnan; Jade Dernbach; Steven Finn; Craig Kieswetter (wk); Eoin Morgan; Samit Patel; Graeme Swann; James Tredwell ^{2}; Jonathan Trott; Chris Woakes | AB de Villiers (c & wk); Hashim Amla; Francois du Plessis; JP Duminy; Dean Elgar; Albie Morkel; Morné Morkel; Ryan McLaren; Justin Ontong; Wayne Parnell; Robin Peterson; Graeme Smith; Dale Steyn; Imran Tahir; Lonwabo Tsotsobe | Stuart Broad (c); Jonny Bairstow; Ravi Bopara; Tim Bresnan; Danny Briggs; Jos Buttler; Jade Dernbach; Steven Finn; Alex Hales; Craig Kieswetter (wk); Michael Lumb; Eoin Morgan; Samit Patel; Graeme Swann; Luke Wright | AB de Villiers (c & wk); Hashim Amla; Farhaan Behardien; Johan Botha; Faf du Plessis; JP Duminy; Jacques Kallis; Richard Levi; Albie Morkel; Morné Morkel; Justin Ontong; Wayne Parnell; Robin Peterson; Dale Steyn; Lonwabo Tsotsobe |

^{1} Thami Tsolekile was brought into the South African squad after Mark Boucher's retirement from international cricket due to an eye injury sustained in the tour match against Somerset.

^{2} James Tredwell was brought into the England squad to replace Graeme Swann after the second ODI.

== Tour matches ==
=== Two-day: Somerset v South Africans ===
9–10 July 2012
Scorecard

| Somerset | v | South Africans |
| 312/8d (64 overs); Peter Trego 104 (63); Lonwabo Tsotsobe 3/46 (8 overs) | | 282/9d (76.3 overs); Hashim Amla 64 (135); Craig Overton 3/59 (11 overs) |
| 50/1 (22 overs); Alex Barrow 31* (64); Vernon Philander 1/6 (5 overs) |

Match drawn
County Ground, Taunton
Umpires: Nigel Cowley (Eng) and Alex Wharf (Eng)

- Somerset won the toss and elected to bat.
- Mark Boucher suffered an eye injury after he was hit by a bail in the 46th over of the Somerset innings. AB de Villiers replaced him as wicket-keeper.

=== First-class: Kent v South Africans ===
13–15 July 2012
Scorecard

| Kent | v | South Africans |
| 210 (74.2 overs); Mike Powell 48* (137); Imran Tahir 4/31 (14.2 overs) | | 314 (93 overs); Hashim Amla 77 (132); Charlie Shreck 3/90 (24 overs) |
| 105/0 (22 overs); Sam Northeast 54* (69) |

Match drawn
St Lawrence Ground, Canterbury
Umpires: Jeff Evans (Eng) and Trevor Jesty (Eng)

- South Africans won the toss and elected to field.

=== Two-day: Worcestershire v South Africans ===
27–28 July 2012
Scorecard

| South Africans | v | Worcestershire |
| 237/9d (65.5 overs); AB de Villiers 80 (118); Chris Russell 3/40 (14 overs) | | 245 (73.5 overs); Aneesh Kapil 67 (80); Robin Peterson 4/65 (15.5 overs) |
| 67/4 (18 overs); Jacques Rudolph 28* (47); Chris Russell 3/32 (9 overs) |

Match drawn
New Road, Worcester
Umpires: Stephen Gale (Eng) and Jeremy Lloyds (Eng)

- South Africans won the toss and elected to bat.

=== Two-day: Derbyshire v South Africans ===
10–11 August 2012
Scorecard

| South Africans | v | Derbyshire |
| 365/4d (70 overs); AB de Villiers 97 (96); Ross Whiteley 1/38 (7 overs) | | 174/9d (49 overs); Ross Whiteley 51* (63); Lonwabo Tsotsobe 4/45 (10 overs) |
| 168/7d (40 overs); Vernon Philander 68* (80); Mark Footitt 4/38 (11 overs) |

Match drawn
County Ground, Derby
Umpires: Ismail Dawood (Eng) and Neil Mallender (Eng)

- Derbyshire won the toss and elected to field.

=== List A: Gloucestershire Gladiators v South Africans ===
22 August 2012
Scorecard

| Gloucestershire Gladiators; 261 (49.5 overs) | v | South Africans; 262/7 (49 overs) |
| Dan Housego 132 (136); Ryan McLaren 3/29 (7.5 overs) | | Wayne Parnell 41 (31); Ravi Bopara 3/43 (10 overs) |

South Africans won by 3 wickets
County Ground, Bristol
Umpires: Michael Gough (Eng) and Peter Willey (Eng)

- South Africa won the toss and elected to field.

== Test series ==
=== 1st Test ===
19–23 July 2012
Scorecard

| England | v | South Africa |
| 385 (125.5 overs); Alastair Cook 115 (295); Morné Morkel 4/72 (24.5 overs) | | 637/2d (189 overs); Hashim Amla 311* (529); James Anderson 1/116 (41 overs) |
| 240 (97 overs); Ian Bell 55 (220); Dale Steyn 5/56 (21 overs) |

South Africa won by an innings and 12 runs
The Oval, London
Umpires: Asad Rauf (Pak) and Steve Davis (Aus)
Player of the match: Hashim Amla (SA)

- England won the toss and elected to bat.
- Start of play on Day 1 delayed by a shower of rain before the toss.
- Rain on Day 2 reduced play to 73 overs.
- Graeme Smith (SA) played in his 100th Test and became the seventh batsman to score a century in his 100th Test.
- Hashim Amla became the first cricketer to score a triple-century for South Africa in Test cricket.
- The partnership of 377 between Amla and Jacques Kallis (182*) is South Africa's highest in Tests against England.

=== 2nd Test ===
2–6 August 2012
Scorecard

| South Africa | v | England |
| 419 (139.2 overs); Alviro Petersen 182 (365); Stuart Broad 3/96 (35 overs) | | 425 (126.4 overs); Kevin Pietersen 149 (214); Imran Tahir 3/92 (23.4 overs) |
| 258/9d (67.4 overs); Jacques Rudolph 69 (122); Stuart Broad 5/69 (16.4 overs) | | 130/4 (33 overs); Alastair Cook 46 (62); JP Duminy 1/10 (2 overs) |

Match drawn
Headingley, Leeds
Umpires: Steve Davis (Aus) and Rod Tucker (Aus)
Player of the match: Kevin Pietersen (Eng)

- England won the toss and elected to field.
- Rain on Day 1 forced an early tea interval and delayed the start of the evening session.
- Play on Day 2 was reduced due to rain and bad light.
- Rain on Day 3 forced an early lunch interval.
- Rain on Day 4 forced an early lunch interval and delayed the start of the afternoon session.
- James Taylor (Eng) made his Test debut.

=== 3rd Test ===
16–20 August 2012
Scorecard

| South Africa | v | England |
| 309 (101.2 overs); Vernon Philander 61 (93); Steven Finn 4/75 (18 overs) | | 315 (107.3 overs); Jonny Bairstow 95 (196); Morné Morkel 4/80 (28.3 overs) |
| 351 (124.2 overs); Hashim Amla 121 (205); Steven Finn 4/74 (27 overs) | | 294 (82.5 overs); Matt Prior 73 (130); Vernon Philander 5/30 (14.5 overs) |

South Africa won by 51 runs
Lord's Cricket Ground, London
Umpires: Kumar Dharmasena (SL) and Simon Taufel (Aus)
Player of the match: Vernon Philander (SA)

- South Africa won the toss and elected to bat.
- Rain delayed the start of the afternoon session on Day 1.
- Rain forced an early lunch interval and delayed the start of the afternoon session on Day 4.
- South Africa rose to number 1 in the ICC World Test Rankings due to their 2–0 series win.
- Andrew Strauss (Eng) played his 100th and final Test match. He announced his retirement from cricket nine days after this Test.

== ODI series ==
=== 1st ODI ===
24 August 2012
10:15
Scorecard

| England; 37/0 (5.3 overs) | v | South Africa |
| Ian Bell 26* (18) |

No result
Sophia Gardens, Cardiff
Umpires: Kumar Dharmasena (SL) and Richard Kettleborough (Eng)

- South Africa won the toss and elected to field.
- Rain delayed the start of the match until 15:00, reducing the match to 23 overs per side.
- Match abandoned after 5.3 overs due to rain.
- Dean Elgar (SA) made his ODI debut.

=== 2nd ODI ===
28 August 2012
13:00 (D/N)
Scorecard

| South Africa; 287/5 (50 overs) | v | England; 207 (40.4 overs) |
| Hashim Amla 150 (124); Graeme Swann 2/50 (10 overs) | | Ian Bell 45 (41); Morne Morkel 2/29 (5.4 overs) |

South Africa won by 80 runs
Rose Bowl, Southampton
Umpires: Rob Bailey (Eng) and Simon Taufel (Aus)
Player of the match: Hashim Amla (SA)

- South Africa won the toss and elected to bat.
- South Africa rise to number 1 in the ICC ODI Rankings.

=== 3rd ODI ===
31 August 2012
13:00 (D/N)
Scorecard

| South Africa; 211 (46.4 overs) | v | England; 212/6 (48 overs) |
| Hashim Amla 43 (51); James Anderson 4/44 (9.4 overs) | | Eoin Morgan 73 (67); Robin Peterson 2/39 (10 overs) |

England won by 4 wickets
The Oval, London
Umpires: Kumar Dharmasena (SL) and Richard Kettleborough (Eng)
Player of the match: Eoin Morgan (Eng)

- South Africa won the toss and elected to bat
- England rise to number 1 in the ICC ODI Rankings.

=== 4th ODI ===
2 September 2012
10:15
Scorecard

| South Africa; 220/8 (50 overs) | v | England; 224/4 (46.4 overs) |
| Hashim Amla 45 (73); James Tredwell 3/35 (8 overs) | | Ian Bell 88 (137); Dale Steyn 2/47 (9.4 overs) |

England won by 6 wickets
Lord's, London
Umpires: Richard Illingworth (Eng) and Simon Taufel (Aus)
Player of the match: Ian Bell (Eng)

- England won the toss and elected to field.

=== 5th ODI ===
5 September 2012
14:00 (D/N)
Scorecard

| England; 182 (45.2 overs) | v | South Africa; 186/3 (34.3 overs) |
| Alastair Cook 51 (72); Robin Peterson 3/37 (10 overs) | | Hashim Amla 97* (107); James Anderson 2/41 (9 overs) |

South Africa won by 7 wickets
Trent Bridge, Nottingham
Umpires: Kumar Dharmasena (SL) and Richard Illingworth (Eng)
Player of the match: Hashim Amla (SA)

- England won the toss and elected to bat.

== T20I series ==
=== 1st T20I ===
8 September 2012
14:30
Scorecard

| England; 118/7 (20 overs) | v | South Africa; 119/3 (19 overs) |
| Craig Kieswetter 25 (24); Johan Botha 2/19 (4 overs) | | Jacques Kallis 48* (44); Jade Dernbach 2/31 (4 overs) |

South Africa won by 7 wickets
Riverside Ground, Chester-le-Street
Umpires: Rob Bailey (Eng) and Richard Illingworth (Eng)
Player of the match: Dale Steyn (SA)

- South Africa won the toss and elected to field.
- Francois du Plessis (SA) made his T20I debut.

=== 2nd T20I ===
10 September 2012
18:30 (D/N)
Scorecard

| South Africa; 77/5 (9 overs) | v | England; 29/2 (4.1 overs) |
| Hashim Amla 47* (30); Steven Finn 2/17 (2 overs) | | Luke Wright 14 (11); Albie Morkel 1/0 (0.1 overs) |

No result
Old Trafford, Manchester
Umpires: Rob Bailey (Eng) and Richard Illingworth (Eng)

- England won the toss and elected to field.
- Rain delayed the start of play and reduced play to 9 overs per side.
- Rain reduced the England innings to 4.1 overs.

=== 3rd T20I ===
12 September 2012
18:30 (D/N)
Scorecard

| England; 118/5 (11 overs) | v | South Africa; 90/5 (11 overs) |
| Craig Kieswetter 50 (32); Johan Botha 2/19 (3 overs) | | Hashim Amla 36 (27); Tim Bresnan 2/14 (2 overs) |

England won by 28 runs
Edgbaston Cricket Ground, Birmingham
Umpires: Rob Bailey (Eng) and Richard Illingworth (Eng)
Player of the match: Jos Buttler (Eng)

- South Africa won the toss and elected to field.
- Rain delayed the start of play and reduced play to 11 overs per side.
- Danny Briggs (Eng) made his T20I debut.

== Statistics ==
=== Test series ===
England

- Alastair Cook scored his 20th century when he scored 115 in the first innings of the 1st Test.
- Graeme Swann reached 1,000 career runs when he scored seven in the second innings of the 1st Test.
- Kevin Pietersen reached 7,000 career runs when he scored 149 in the first innings of the 2nd Test.
- Kevin Pietersen scored his 21st century when he scored 149 in the first innings of the 2nd Test.
- Andrew Strauss reached 7,000 career runs when he scored 22 in the second innings of the 2nd Test.
- Stuart Broad took his sixth five-wicket haul in the second innings of the 2nd Test.
- Matt Prior reached 3,000 career runs when he scored 73 in the second innings of the 3rd Test.
