= Newport, Isle of Wight =

County town of the Isle of Wight, England

Newport
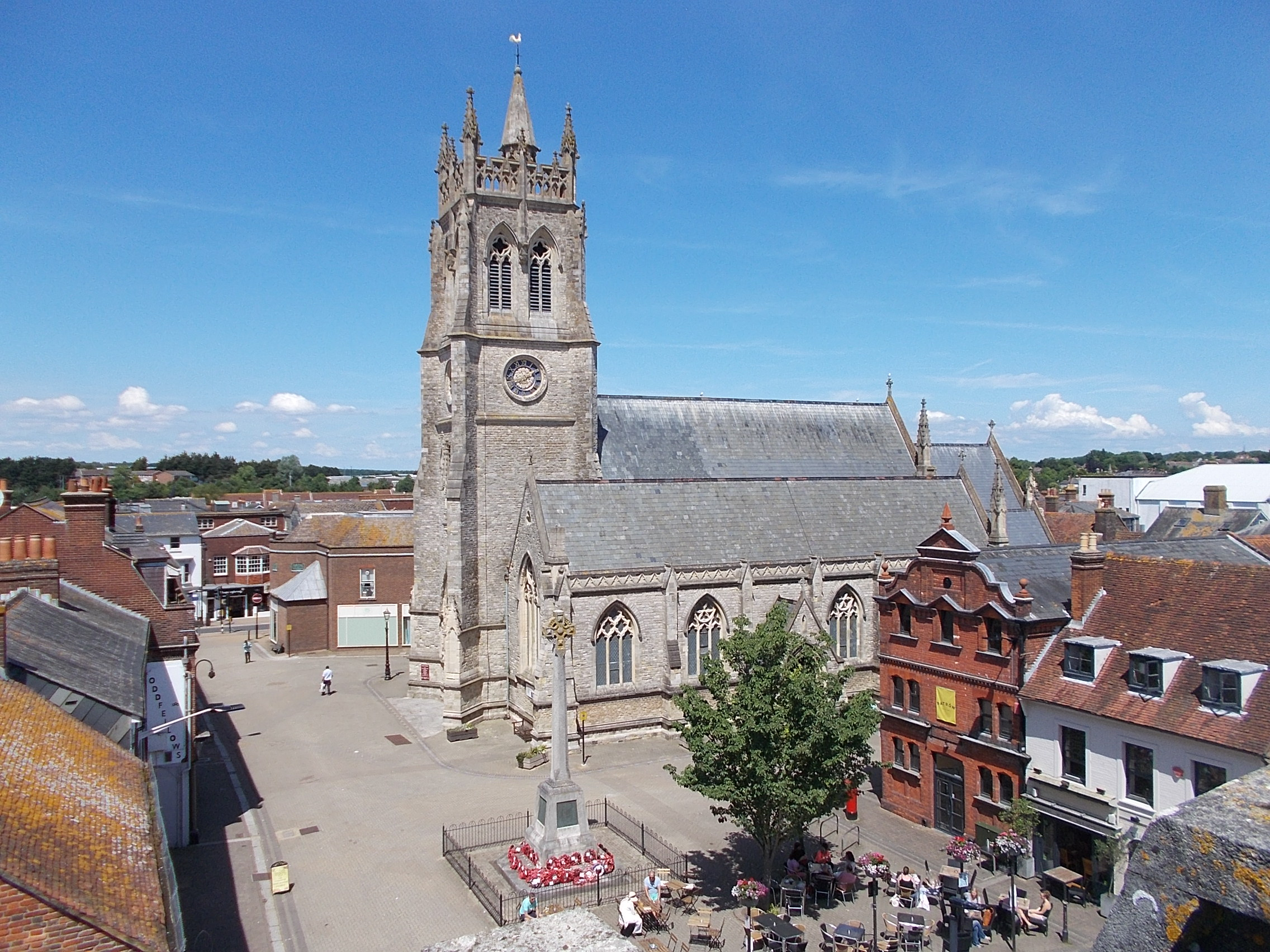
- Sts Thomas Minster, set within St Thomas's Square

- Location within the Isle of Wight
- Area: 6.747 km^{2} (2.605 sq mi)
- Population: 25,407 (2021 census)
  - Density: 3,766/km^{2} (9,750/sq mi)
- OS grid reference: SZ502893
  - London: 90.26 miles
- Civil parish: Newport and Carisbrooke
- Unitary authority: Isle of Wight
- Ceremonial county: Isle of Wight
- Region: South East
- Country: England
- Sovereign state: United Kingdom
- Post town: NEWPORT
- Postcode district: PO30
- Dialling code: 01983
- Police: Hampshire and Isle of Wight
- Fire: Hampshire and Isle of Wight
- Ambulance: Isle of Wight
- UK Parliament: Isle of Wight West

Newport is the county town of the Isle of Wight, an island county off the south coast of England. The town is slightly north of the centre of the island, located in the civil parish of Newport and Carisbrooke. It has a quay at the head of the navigable section of the River Medina, which flows northwards to Cowes and the Solent. The 2021 census recorded a population of 25,407.

== Name ==
The name means 'the new harbour or market town', from Old English nīwe and port.

1189-1204: Novo Burgo

1202: Neweport

1227: Neuport

1279: Niweport

1307: Newporte

The earliest spelling (ablative case of Latin novus burgus) is common in medieval sources.

== History ==
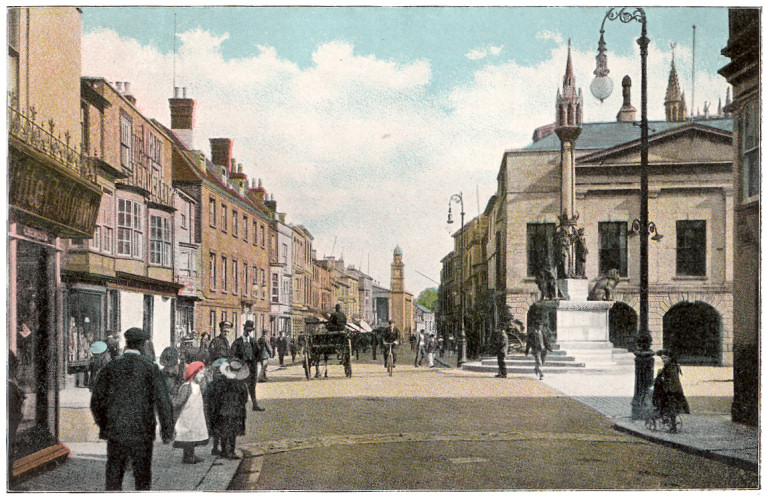
Newport High Street, circa 1910

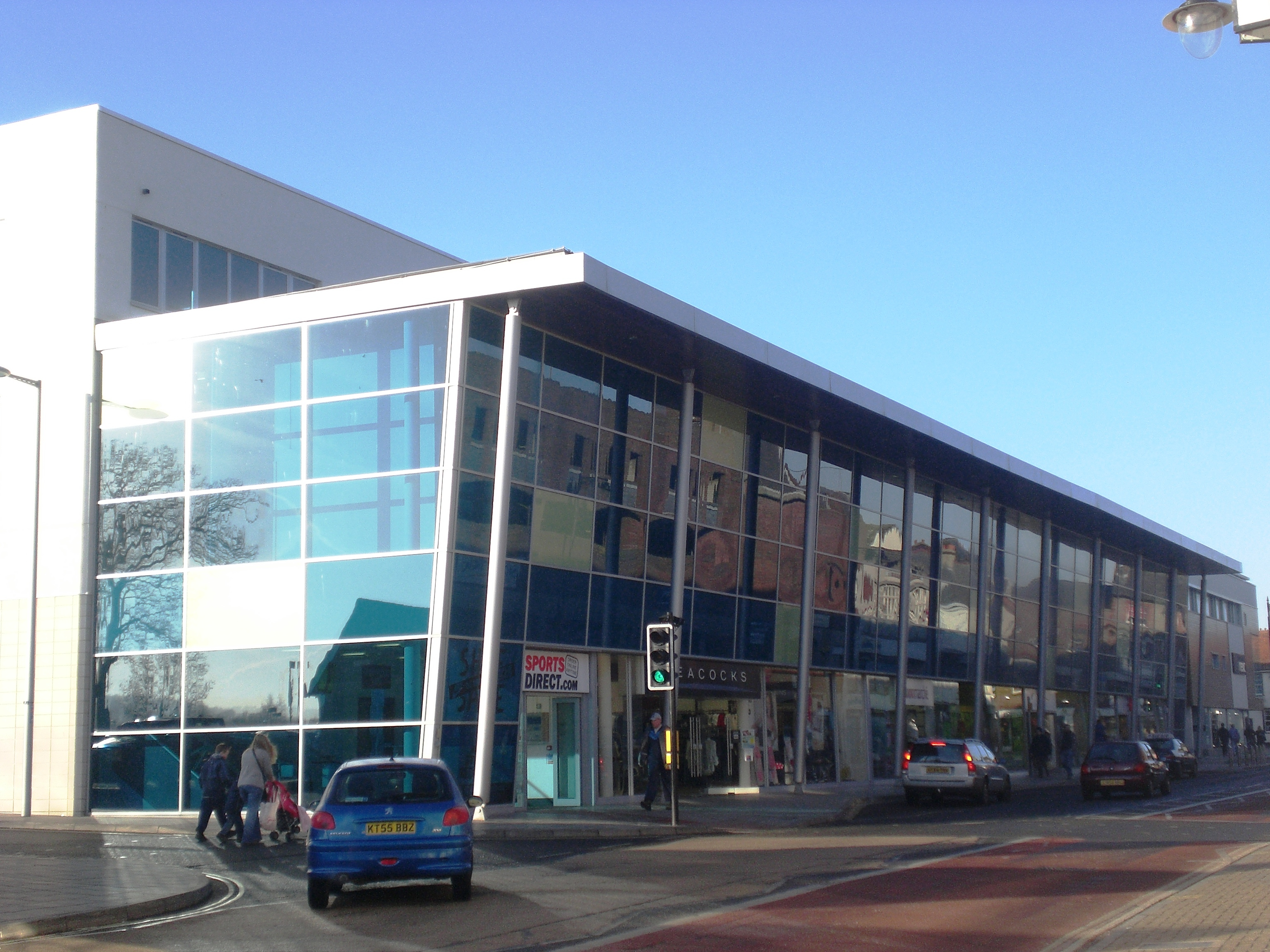
Retail development in South Street

Mousterian remains, featuring tools made by Neanderthals at least 40,000 years ago, were found at Great Pan Farm in the 1970s.

There are signs of Roman settlement in the area, which was probably known as Medina. They include two known Roman villas, one of which, Newport Roman Villa, has been excavated and opened to the public.

Information on the area resumes after the Norman Conquest. The first charter was granted in the late 12th century. In 1377 an invading French force burnt down much of the town while attempting to take Carisbrooke Castle, then under the command of Sir Hugh Tyrill. A group of Frenchmen were captured and killed, then buried in a tumulus later nicknamed Noddies Hill, a "noddy" being medieval slang for a body. This was later corrupted to Nodehill, the present name for a part of central Newport – a name that seems inappropriate, as the area is flat.

In 1648 Charles I and a group of Parliamentary Commissioners concluded the Treaty of Newport, an attempt to reach a compromise in the Civil War that was undermined by Charles's negotiations with the French and Scots to intervene on his behalf. The Treaty was repudiated by Oliver Cromwell upon returning from defeating the Scots at the Battle of Preston. This led to Charles's execution.

The town had been incorporated as a borough in 1608. The town's position as an area of trade accessible to the sea meant it rapidly took over from nearby Carisbrooke as the main central settlement, eventually absorbing the latter as a suburb. The borough ceased to exist in 1974 when it was incorporated into the larger Borough of Medina, which was itself superseded in 1995 by a single unitary authority covering the whole of the Isle of Wight.

A school known as the Blue school focusing on the education of poor girls opened in the town in 1761. It closed in 1907.

The Drill hall in Newport opened as the headquarters of the Isle of Wight Rifle Volunteers in 1860.

Newport since the 1960s has acquired new shopping facilities and a pedestrianised central square. Through road traffic has ceased in many of the narrow streets. Newport Quay has been redeveloped with art galleries such as the Quay Arts Centre, and new flats converted from old warehouses.

The Queen Victoria Memorial was designed by local architect Percy Stone (1856–1934).

== Geography ==
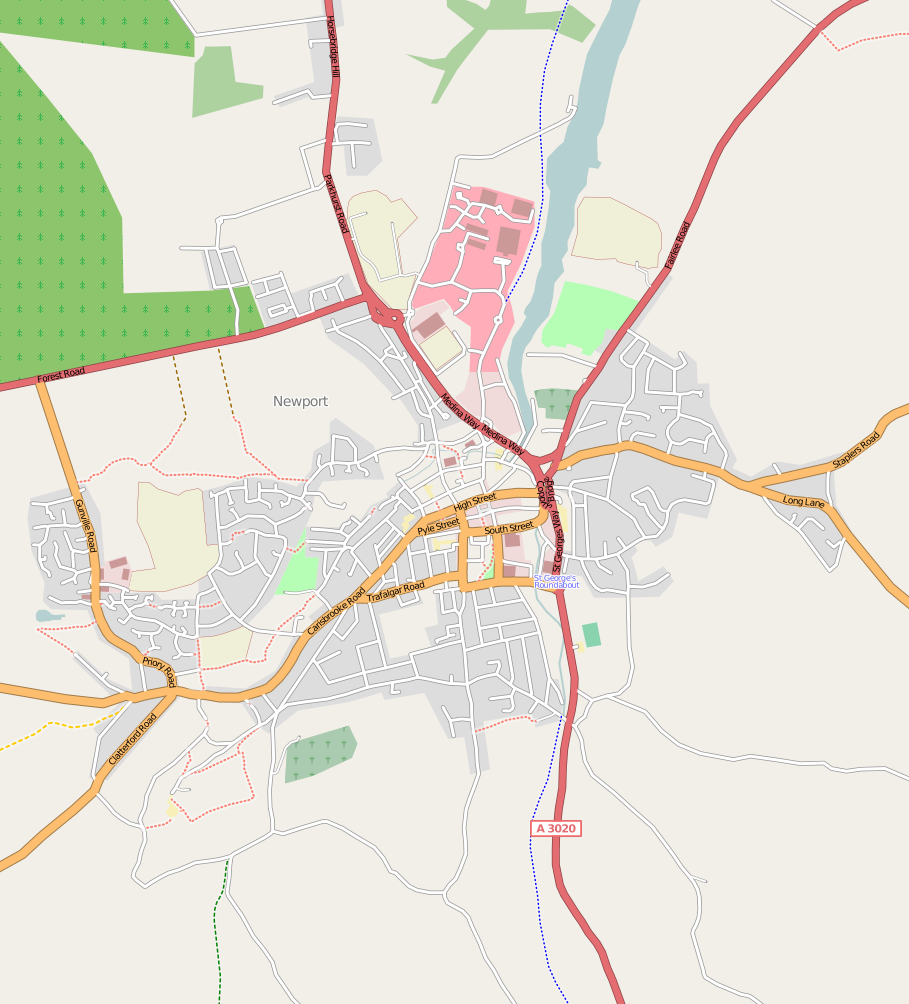
A map showing Newport.

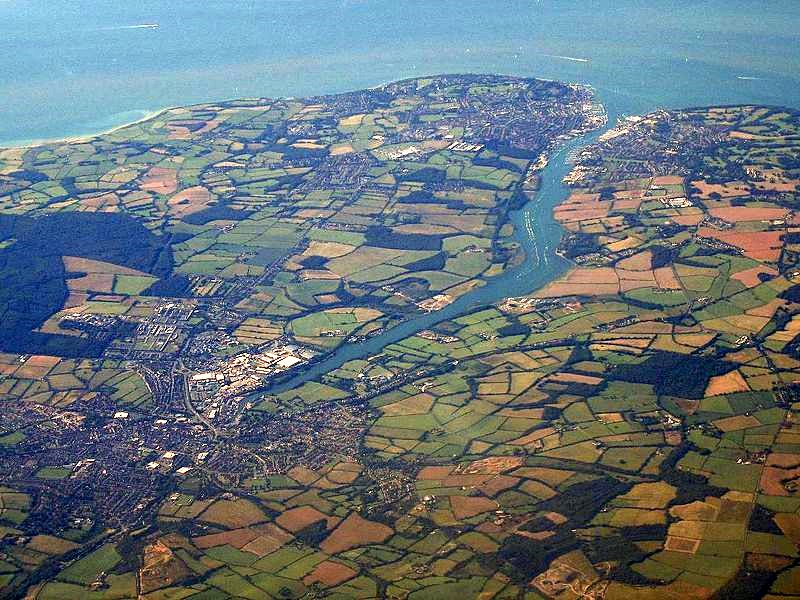
An aerial photograph, showing Newport (bottom left)

Geographically located in the centre of the Isle of Wight, at 50.701°N, 1.2883°W, Newport is the principal town on the island. It has public transport connections with all the island's major towns. It serves as the island's main shopping centre and location for public services. The main A3020 and A3054 roads converge as Medina Way between the busy roundabouts at Coppins Bridge and St Mary's Hospital.

Newport railway station was the hub of the Island's rail network until the mid-20th century, but closed in 1966. The site is now occupied by the dual-carriageway A3020 Medina Way.

The nearest city to the town is Portsmouth, about 13 miles (21 km) north-east on Portsea Island, adjoining the mainland. More locally, Ryde, the island's largest town, is to the north-east. Sandown and Shanklin are to the east and Cowes to the north.

The River Medina runs through Newport. North of its confluence with the Lukely Brook at the town's quay, it becomes a navigable tidal estuary.

Distance from surrounding settlements

- Cowes – 4.5 miles, 7 km
- East Cowes – 5 miles, 8 km
- Ryde – 7 miles, 11 km
- Shanklin – 9 miles, 15 km
- Sandown – 10 miles, 16 km
- Ventnor – 11 miles, 18 km
- Yarmouth, Isle of Wight – 10 miles, 16 km

== Prisons ==
The town's suburb of Parkhurst houses two Category B men's prisons: Parkhurst Prison and Albany. Together they make up HMP Isle of Wight, which is one of the largest prisons in the UK. Parkhurst and Albany were once among the few top-security prisons in the United Kingdom. Camp Hill was another prison in the area, but it closed in 2013.

== Amenities ==
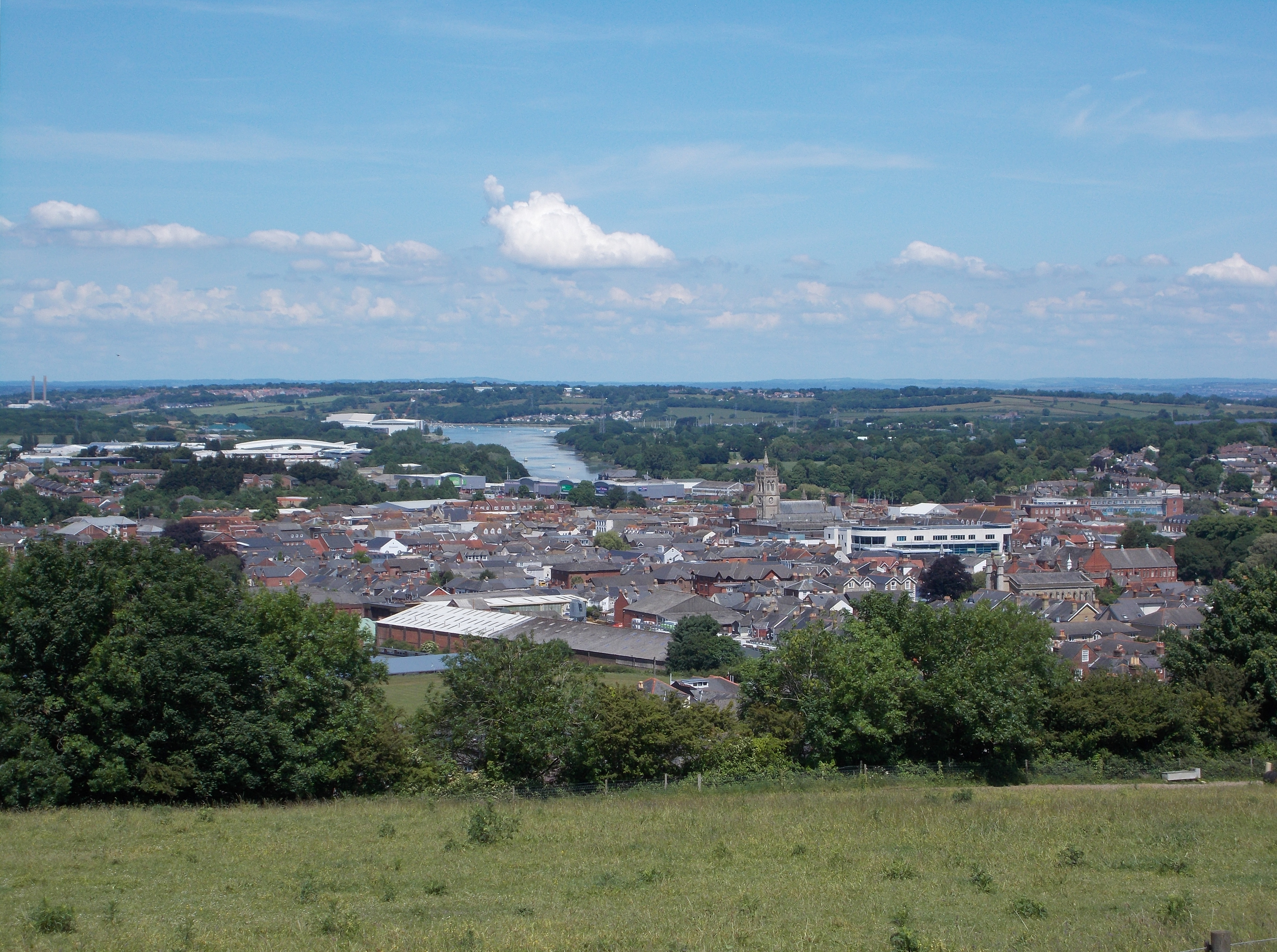
View of Newport from Mount Joy, looking north with the Medina estuary in the distance

Seaclose Park in Newport, on the east bank of the River Medina, has since 2002 been the location for the revived Isle of Wight Music Festival, which is held once a year. Newport is home to the Postal Museum, possibly the largest private collection of vintage postal equipment and post boxes in the world.

Newport bus station is the town's central bus terminus. It acts as the hub of the Southern Vectis network, with routes from across the Island terminating there.

=== Sport ===
St George's Park is the home of Newport Football Club, the most successful of the Island's football teams, currently play in the Wessex League. The stadium has a capacity of 3,000. In 2018, an application was approved unanimously by the Isle of Wight council for a new stadium off the racecourse roundabout near Newport. This will be the new stadium for Newport (IW) F.C., so that St George's Park can be turned into an out-of-town retail area. The town is also represented by Newport Cricket Club, which plays at Victoria recreation ground. Its two teams compete in Harwoods Renault Divisions 1 and 2. The Isle of Wight County Cricket Ground is located at Newclose, on the outskirts of the town.

=== Media ===
Local news and television programmes are provided by BBC South and ITV Meridian. Television signals are received from the nearby Rowridge TV transmitter which is situated south west of the town.

Local radio stations are BBC Radio Solent on 96.1 FM, Heart South on 97.5 FM, Capital South on 103.2 FM, Easy Radio South Coast on 107.4 FM, Nation Radio South Coast on 106.0 FM, Greatest Hits Radio South on 105.2 FM and community based stations: Vectis Radio on 104.6 FM and Isle of Wight Radio on 102.0 FM.

The town is served by these local newspapers, Isle of Wight County Press, Isle of Wight Observer and Island Echo.

=== Schools ===
The town of Newport and the adjoining village of Carisbrooke together have seven primary schools, three secondary schools, a sixth-form campus, a further education college and two special schools. The primary schools located close to the town centre are Newport C of E Primary and Nine Acres Community Primary. Barton Primary is on Pan estate, while Summerfields Primary is nearby on the Staplers estate, both to the east of the town. Hunnyhill Ormiston Academy is situated in Forest Road to the north of the town. There are two primary schools in Carisbrooke: Carisbrooke C of E Primary in Wellington Road and St Thomas of Canterbury Catholic Primary in the High Street, in the village centre.

The three secondary schools are Carisbrooke College, Medina College and Christ the King College. Carisbrooke College is located on a large site on the outskirts of Carisbrooke village, whilst Christ the King is just down the road, occupying two former middle school sites on opposite sides of Wellington Road. Medina College is situated to the east of the town, just off Fairlee Road, along with Medina Leisure Centre and Medina Theatre. The Island Innovation VI Form Campus is the joint sixth form for the Carisbrooke and Medina colleges. It is located in the town centre, on the site of the former Nodehill Middle School.

The Isle of Wight College stands to the north of the town centre, close to St Mary's Roundabout and the large industrial estate. Medina House School is located between Pan and Staplers, and St Georges School to the south of the town in the suburban Watergate Road.

== Governance ==
=== Parliamentary representation ===
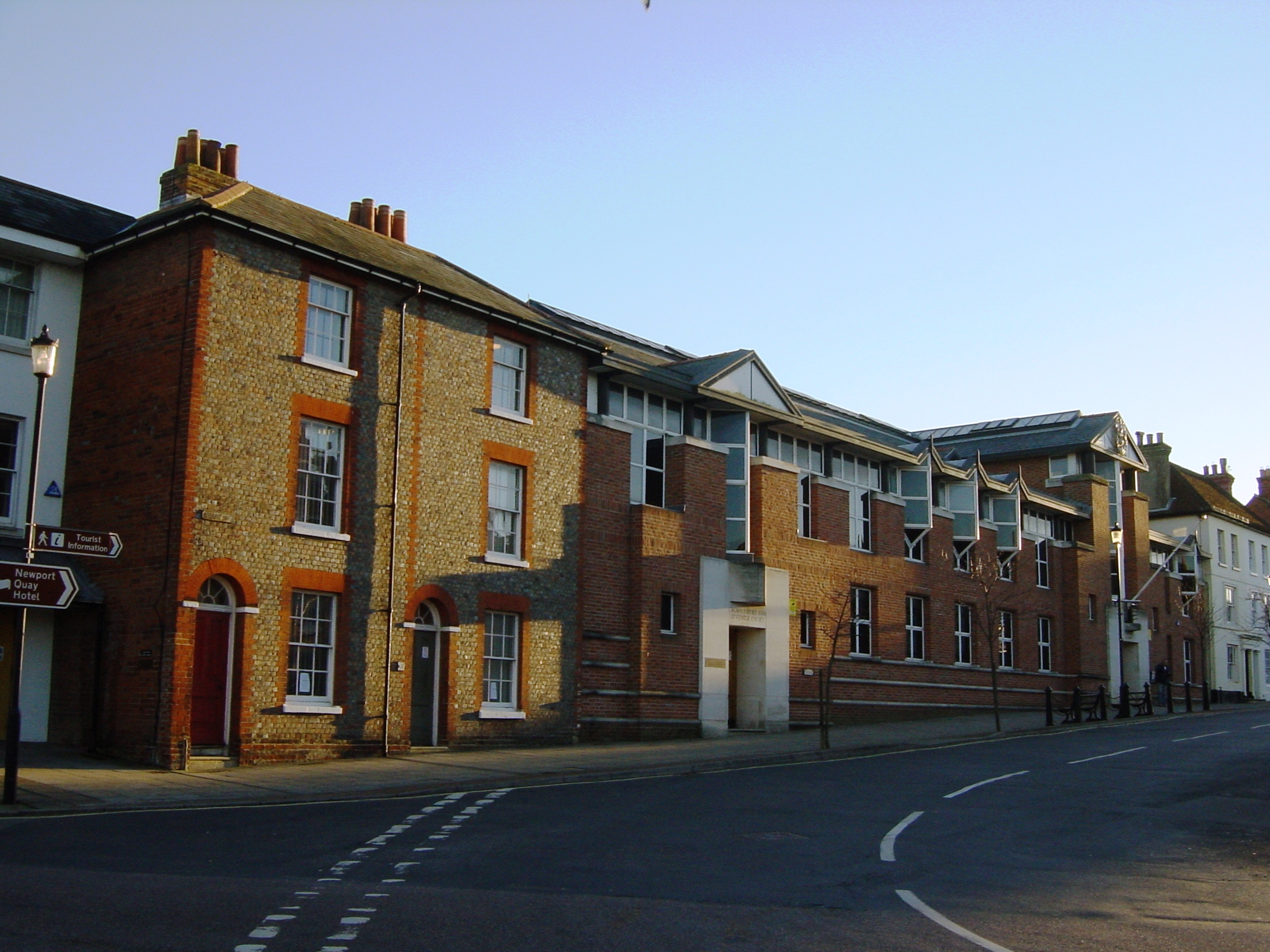
Isle of Wight Crown Court in Newport

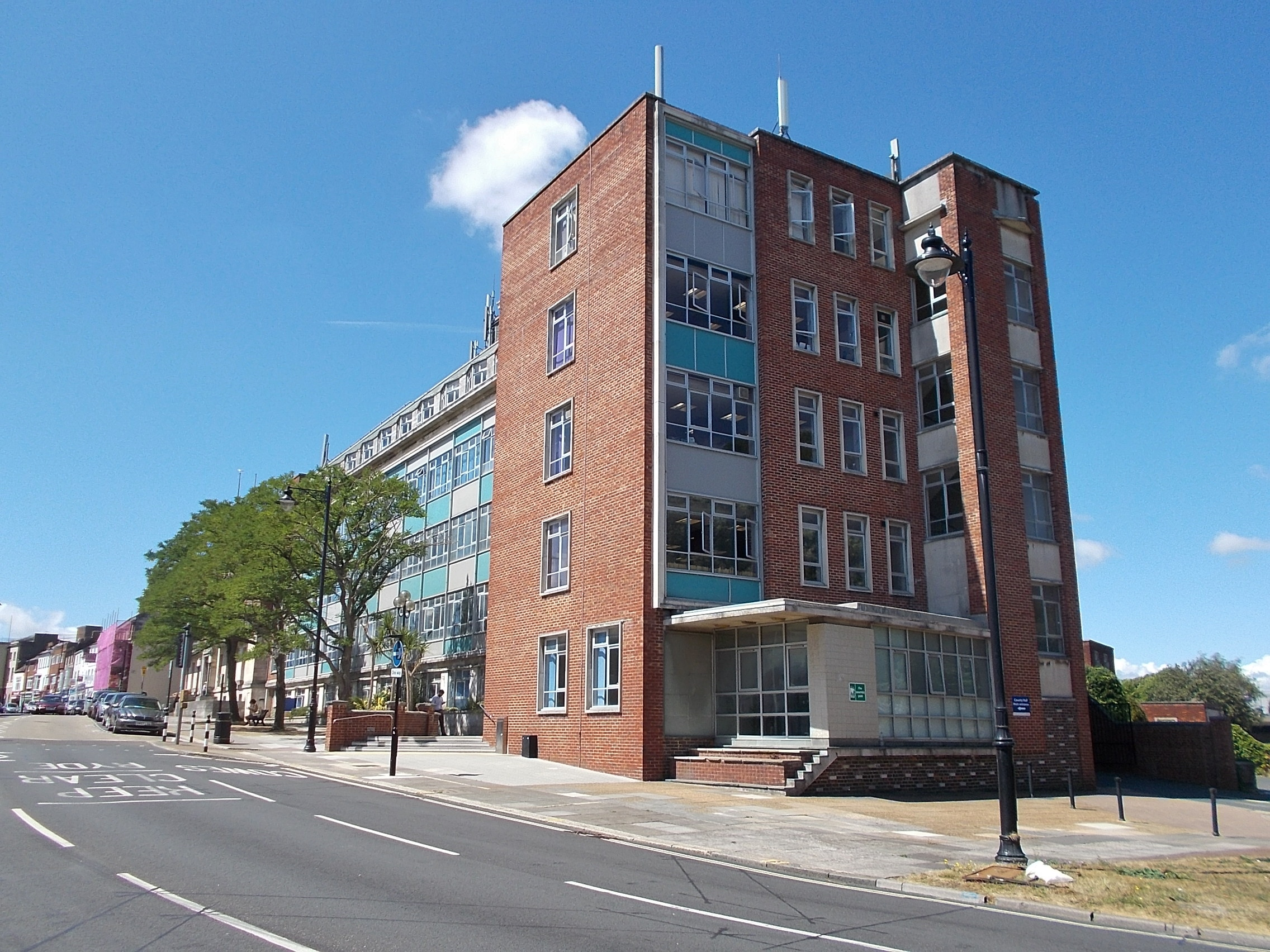
County Hall, Newport

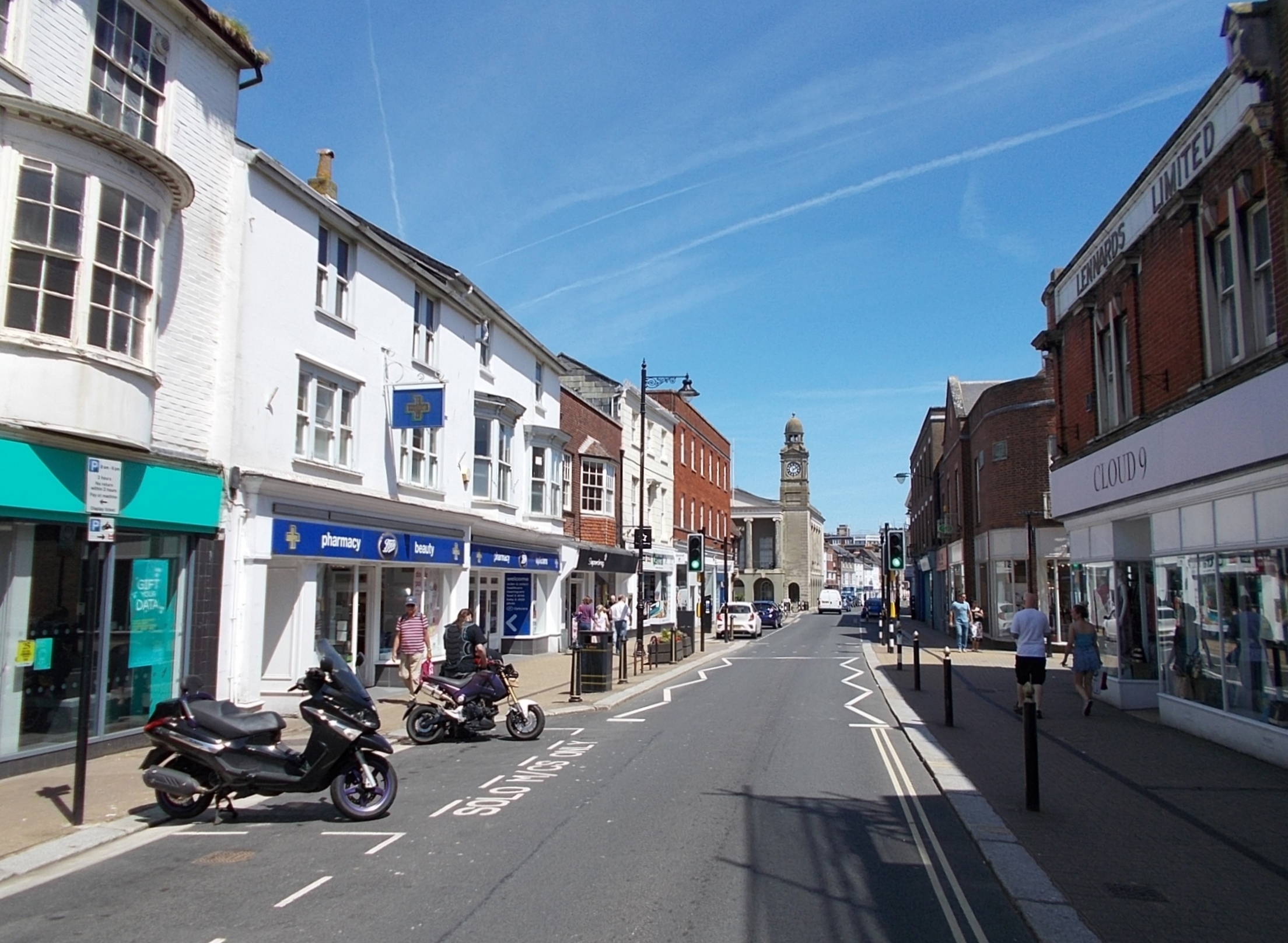
Newport High Street

From the Middle Ages the Parliamentary Borough of Newport had two seats in the House of Commons. Between 1807 and 1811 they were held by two future prime ministers: Arthur Wellesley, later to become the Duke of Wellington (who was also elected to two other seats at the same time) and Henry John Temple, 3rd Viscount Palmerston. Palmerston was eligible as an MP because his late father did not convert his Irish peerage into a United Kingdom peerage, which would have confined him to the House of Lords. The local patron arranging the deal was Sir Leonard Holmes, who made it a condition that they never visited the borough.

The borough was also represented by two other future prime ministers in the 1820s. George Canning was MP for Newport when appointed Prime Minister in 1827. However, under the law as it then stood, a minister accepting office automatically vacated his seat and had to stand for re-election to the Commons, and Canning chose to stand at Seaford, a government pocket borough in Sussex, rather than fight Newport again. However, in the by-election that followed at Newport, the town elected the Hon. William Lamb, later 2nd Viscount Melbourne, whose father had also represented the borough in the 1790s. However, Lamb remained MP for Newport for only two weeks, before also being elected for Bletchingley, which he preferred to represent.

Newport's representation in Parliament was cut to one seat in 1867 and abolished altogether as a separate constituency in 1885. It was part of the Isle of Wight parliamentary constituency until 2024, and now belongs to the Isle of Wight West constituency.

=== Local council ===
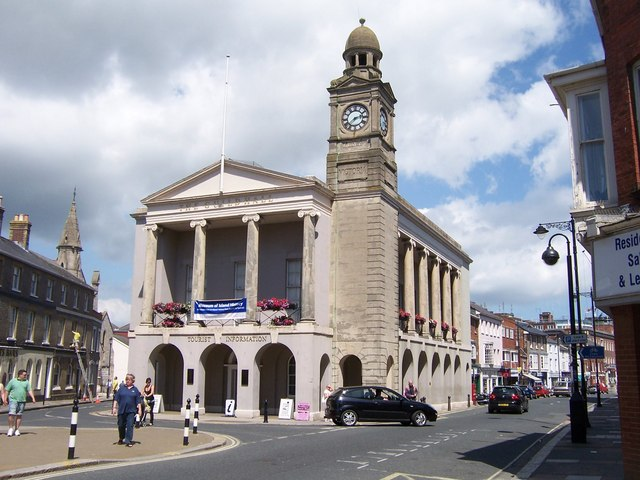
Newport Guildhall

Newport has had a variety of local government administrations.

- Until 1974 Newport had its own local authority, Newport Borough Council, which until 1967 was based at Newport Guildhall.
- In 1974–1995 Newport was under Medina Borough Council.
- In 1995 this was abolished and the Isle of Wight Council, based at County Hall, took over responsibility. Newport remained unparished until 2008.
- Newport Town Management Committee was established in April 2006 by the Isle of Wight Council as an interim body for the town until the Government gave approval for a parish or town council. The Management Committee had no formal powers and was technically no more than an advisory committee to the Isle of Wight Council. However, it was treated as a transitional authority, which acted in many ways as a town or parish council.
- The parish was formed on 1 April 2008 and the first election to Newport Parish Council occurred on 1 May 2008.
- The parish of Newport was renamed "Newport and Carisbrooke" on 20 September 2018, the parish of Carisbrooke had been merged with Newport on 1 April 1933, at the 1931 census (the last one before the merger of Carisbrooke), Newport had a population of 11,322.

== Notable people ==
In birth order:

- Sir Thomas Fleming (1544–1613), judge in the trial of Guy Fawkes.
- Elizabeth Stuart (1635–1650), daughter of Charles I and Henrietta Maria, is buried at St. Thomas' Church.
- Edward Vernon Utterson (1775–1856), lawyer, was one of Six Clerks in Chancery, an antiquary and an editor.
- Sarah Elizabeth Utterson (1781–1851), translator and author.
- Charlotte Anley (1796–1893), novelist and songwriter, lived in the town in the mid-1820s.
- Henry Sewell (1807–1879), First Prime Minister/Premier of New Zealand 7 May to 20 May 1856.
- William Buckler (1814–1884), portrait artist and entomologist, was born and lived here, and died in Lumley, near Emsworth.
- Thomas Chatfeild-Clarke (1829-1895) Architect, surveyor and politician
- Maxwell Gray (Mary Gleed Tuttiett, 1846–1923), novelist and poet
- Westmore Family, prominent family in Hollywood make-up
- Craig Douglas (born 1941), pop singer of the late 1950s and early 1960s
- Geoffrey Hughes (1944–2012), actor
- Tony Howe (born 1939), club steward.
- Anthony Minghella (1954–2008), film director
- Phill Jupitus (born 1962), comedian
- Kelly Sotherton (born 1976), heptathlete
- Darren Mew (born 1979), breast-stroke swimmer
- Lewis Buxton (born 1983), footballer with Bolton Wanderers
- Gary Silk (born 1984), footballer
- David Griffiths (born 1985), cricketer
- Chris Russell (born 1989), cricketer
- Danny Briggs (born 1991), cricketer
- Adam Hose (born 1992), cricketer
- Keegan Brown (born 1992), professional darts player

== See also ==
- Church of St John the Baptist
- St Paul's Church
