= Plymouth Guildhall =

Municipal building in Plymouth, Devon, England

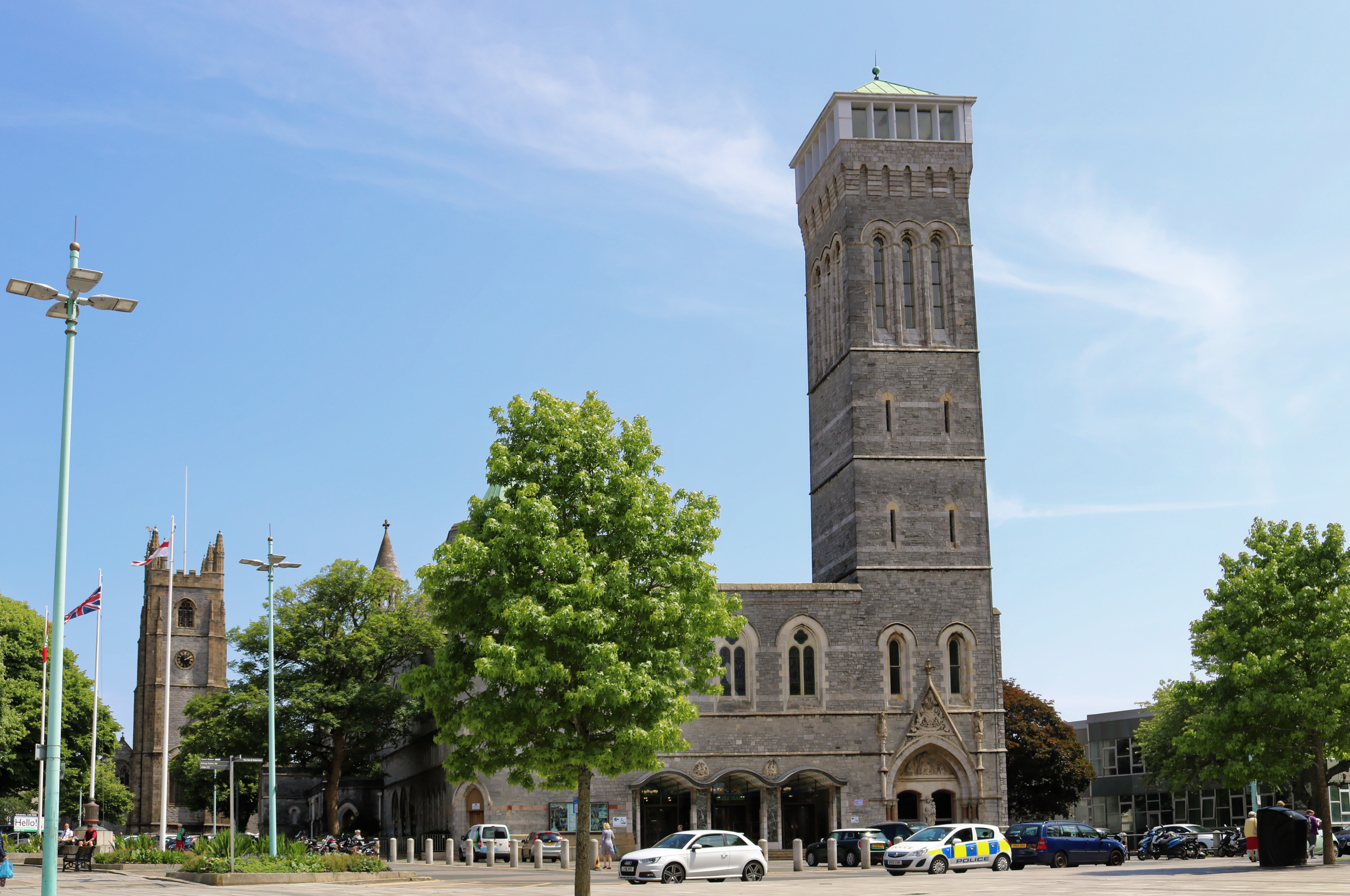
- The west front of the guildhall

- Location within Devon
- 50.369791°N 4.141469°W
- Location: Plymouth, Devon

History
- Built: 1874

Site notes
- Architect(s): Norman and Hine
- Architectural style: Gothic Revival style

Listed Building – Grade II
- Designated: 1 May 1975
- Reference no.: 1113280

Plymouth Guildhall is located on Guildhall Square in the city centre of Plymouth, Devon, England. It is a Grade II listed building.

== History ==
The first guildhall can be dated back to the 15th century and is believed to have been located in the Old Town; it was replaced by a second guildhall which was erected in the Southside Street / Woolster Street area in 1440. A third guildhall was built in the Jacobean style at the junction of High Street and Whimple Street in 1607; this was demolished to allow a fourth guildhall, designed by a Mr Eveleigh, to be built and completed in 1800.

The foundation stone for the current building, which was the fifth, was laid by the mayor, William Luscombe, on 28 July 1870. It was designed by Norman and Hine of Plymouth with artistic direction by Edward William Godwin in the Gothic Revival style and built by Messrs Call and Pethick. The building was one of a pair of civic buildings on opposite sides of Guildhall Square which were built at the same time; facing it on the north side of the square was the Municipal Offices, which housed the council's administrative offices and council chamber. The guildhall incorporated courtrooms and a great hall for ceremonial functions and public events. Both buildings were officially opened by Prince of Wales on 13 August 1874.

The design for the west front of the guildhall, where the entrance now is, involved an octagonal tower on the left and a 50 meters (160 ft) high square tower on the right. Internally, the principal room was the Great Hall: a pipe organ, made by Henry Willis & Sons, was installed in the hall and the first recital given on 22 October 1878.

The guildhall and the surrounding buildings, including the municipal offices, were reduced to shells on the night of 21 March 1941 during the Plymouth Blitz of the Second World War. The ruins of the municipal offices were demolished and not rebuilt. Paton Watson and Patrick Abercrombie envisaged a Beaux Arts city which would have involved the demolition of the Guildhall: their proposal was rejected by one council vote in 1951. Following the restoration of the building, which involved a new roof, entrances and interior, the building was re-opened by Field Marshal the Viscount Montgomery of Alamein on 24 September 1959.

A new headquarters for the city council was completed in 1962 at the Civic Centre, located a short distance to the west of the guildhall. Meanwhile, the assize courts, which had met in the guildhall, moved to the new Law Courts in Armada Way in 1963.

== Description ==
The Great Hall is currently a multi-purpose venue, hosting a range of events throughout the year including graduations, award ceremonies, weddings and civil ceremonies. Fourteen stained glass windows, designed by Frederick Halford Coventry (1905–1997), line the sides of the hall and depict notable moments in Plymouth's history. A large 19th century tapestry, made at Gobelins Manufactory, hangs at the front and depicts Raphael's vision of the "Miraculous Drought of Fishes". Famous performers in the hall have included the rock bands The Who in December 1965, Emerson, Lake & Palmer in August 1970, Status Quo in March 1973 and Queen in March 1974, as well as the European Union Chamber Orchestra conducted by Julian Lloyd Webber in April 2009.
