= HM Prison Albany =

Site of HM Prison Isle of Wight

Coordinates: 50°42′44″N 1°18′26″W

HMP Isle of Wight – Albany Barracks
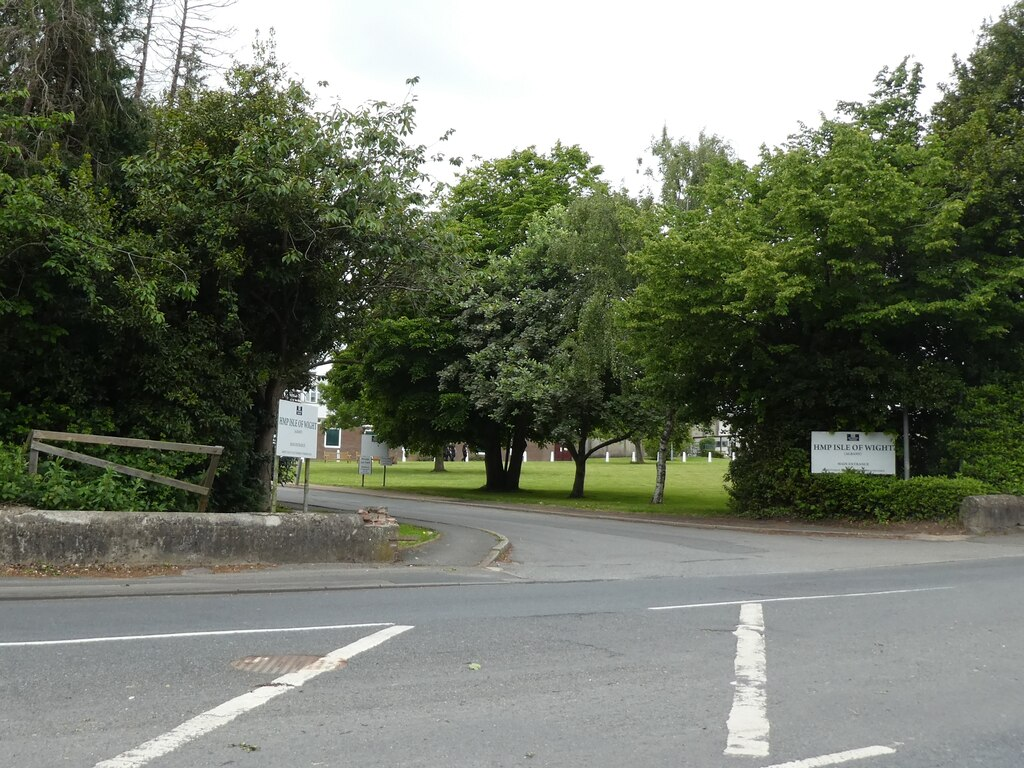
- Entrance to HMP Albany
- Interactive map of HMP Isle of Wight – Albany Barracks
- Location: Newport, Isle of Wight
- Security class: Adult Male/Category B
- Population: 566 (April 2008)
- Opened: 1967
- Managed by: HM Prison Services
- Governor: Doug Graham
- Website: www.gov.uk/guidance/isle-of-wight-prison

HM Prison Albany is a Category B men's prison, situated on the outskirts of Newport on the Isle of Wight, England. The prison is operated by His Majesty's Prison Service. Albany is located next to Parkhurst, another Male/B prison and together they form HM Prison Isle of Wight.

== History ==
Albany was designed and built as a Category C Training Prison in the early 1960s occupying the site of Albany Barracks. Soon after opening in 1967, a decision was taken to upgrade Albany to a Category B prison and, in 1970, Albany became part of the dispersal system. It suffered major disturbances in 1972 which closed most of the Prison for over a year.

In 1992, Albany was redesignated as a Category B Closed Training Prison. In January 1998 Albany changed from being half Vulnerable Prisoner Unit and half Normal Location, and is now exclusively used to house sex offenders and vulnerable prisoners. Albany also operates as an Assessment Centre for the core Sex Offender Treatment Programme.

In August 2001 spikes (designed to stop birds perching) had to be removed from the exterior of Albany Prison after it was discovered that some of the spikes were coming loose. Prison Officers feared that inmates could use the spikes as a weapon against them.

In March 2006 the kitchen providing meals to inmates at Albany prison was awarded a five-star rating for kitchen hygiene by the environmental health department of the Isle of Wight Council. The inspection of kitchens at 1,900 premises on the Isle of Wight, including schools, church halls, cafes and restaurants found Albany to have a top rating in standards of food preparation, ahead of establishments such as the Royal Yacht Squadron club.

In May 2006 up to 60 prisoners at Albany Prison issued writs demanding compensation from the Home Office. The inmates demanded compensation because they were prevented from using the lavatory when security checks were being carried out.

In 2009, Albany joined HM Prison Parkhurst to form super prison HM Prison Isle of Wight, with each site retaining their old names.

In May 2010 a man dressed as Snoopy and an accomplice attempted to enter the Albany site, trying to free a prisoner. The pistol the costumed man carried was a water gun. The person the men were trying to free was located in the Camp Hill unit.

=== 1972 disturbances ===
The UK prisoners Union Preservation of the Rights of Prisoners had been founded on 11 May 1972. It had started organising peaceful protests in prisons across England. There were five protests between 11 and 13 June, including one in Albany. On 4 August there was an England-wide prison strike involving 10,000 prisoners, i.e. 25% of the total prison population. This included Albany. The Prison Officers Association found this disturbing. By the week of 21 August they had issued a six-point policy document called Get Tough. However Prison Officers in Albany rejected this as not being strong enough and demanded stricter punishments for every infringement of the regulations. This was backed up by threat of a work-to-rule and overtime ban if their demands were not met by 13 September. Further prison officers provided stories for the media of a "mafia-style" organisation amongst high-profile long term prisoners. Several were named: Charles Kray, Robert Welch, John Duddy, Ian Brady and Ray Morris. A deputation of Police Officers met with Governor, and shortly afterwards the Governor organised a lock-up and search of the entire prison, citing fears of a mass escape as the reason.

== Current status ==
Albany holds Category B/C sex offenders and vulnerable prisoners. Accommodation at Albany Prison comprises six wings (House Blocks 11–17), as well as a separate induction unit and an 18 bed inpatient healthcare unit. All wings are identical and hold prisoners in single cells with in-cell but no toilet or sink. On each landing there are communal recesses housing toilets and wash basins. There are also phones in each cell, and one TV room within each wing as well as each cell.

== Notable inmates ==
- Gary Glitter, served from 2015 to 2018.
- Plymouth-based businessman and serial child rapist William Goad, served from October 2004 until his death in October 2012.
