= Plymouth Law Courts =

Court building in Plymouth, England

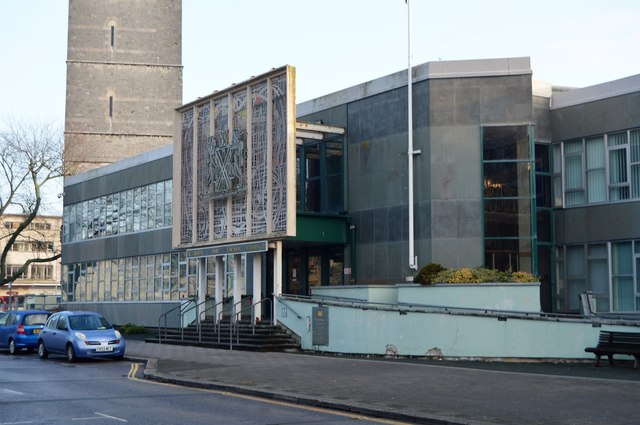
- Plymouth Law Courts

- Shown in Devon
- 50.3692°N 4.1415°W
- Location: Armada Way, Plymouth

History
- Built: 1963

Site notes
- Architect: Hector Stirling
- Architectural style: Modernist style

Plymouth Law Courts, also known as Plymouth Combined Court Centre, is a Crown Court venue which deals with criminal cases, as well as a County Court, which deals with civil cases, in Armada Way, Plymouth, England. The building is located just to the east of Plymouth Civic Centre and just to the south of Plymouth Guildhall.

== History ==
For much of the 19th century, quarter sessions hearings in Plymouth were held in the old Guildhall in Whimple Street and then, after 1874, in the new Guildhall in Guildhall Square. However, as the number of court cases in Plymouth grew in the first half of the 20th century, it became necessary to commission a more modern courthouse for criminal matters. The site selected by the Lord Chancellor's Department had been occupied a narrow street known as "Princes Street Ope" (Note: An "ope" was a short alleyway or opening.) which accommodated public and commercial buildings dating from the 1860s. The street had formed part of the area of Plymouth which had been heavily bombed as part of the Plymouth Blitz during the Second World War.

The new building was designed by the city architect, Hector Stirling, built by Costain Group in grey stone and glass, and was officially opened by the Master of the Rolls, Lord Denning, on 16 April 1963. The design involved a broadly symmetrical main frontage facing onto Armada Way. At the centre of the frontage, there was a short flight of steps leading up to an opening containing four doorways. A large latticework incorporating the city's coat of arms was projected forward over the entrance. The building was fenestrated on both floors by a continuous band of casement windows with grey stone panels above and below. A Royal coat of arms was fixed to the building on the first floor at the north end. Internally, the building was laid out to accommodate four courtrooms. The architectural historian, Nikolaus Pevsner, was unimpressed with the design and described it as a "bland box of 1963".

Following the implementation of the Courts Act 1971, the former assizes courthouse became the venue for hearings of the newly designated Plymouth Crown Court.

Notable cases have included the trial and conviction of William Goad, in October 2004, on two charges of indecent assault and 14 counts of rape; Goad has been described in various newspapers as "Britain's most prolific paedophile". They have also included the trial and conviction of Anthony Brinton, in October 2020, for the murder of his partner's flatmate, Adrian Cieslik, using a hammer in the attack.
