= William Goad =

Criminal

- Goad following his arrest in 2003
- Born: 12 July 1944
- Died: 20 October 2012 (aged 68); HM Prison Albany, England
- Occupation: Businessman
- Known for: Child rapist
- Status: Deceased
- Criminal charges: 14 counts of rape and 2 counts of indecent assault (October 2004)
- Penalty: Life imprisonment

William Goad (12 July 1944 – 20 October 2012) was a British millionaire businessman from Plymouth, Devon, who was imprisoned for life for child rape. He was called in various newspapers "Britain's most prolific paedophile", with his assaults causing two of his victims to commit suicide. His abuse spanned 35 years with victims as young as eight.

== Career ==
Goad opened Cornish Market World in 1991, which became at one point Britain's biggest indoor market with more than 300 stalls. In the mid-1990s Goad launched Ben's Playworld, a children's play zone hosting a range of activities aimed at 2 to 12-year-olds, including mega-slides, giant tubes and a massive ball-pond. Goad's fortune was once estimated to be around £25 million.

== Investigation ==
One of his victims gave statements in the late 80s and early 90s, which led to his first arrest for indecent assault. Goad was put on probation. As a result of increasing statements from victims, a police investigation, Operation Emotion, had opened up. Goad became aware and changed his name to David Scott and moved to the nearby town of Ivybridge. In 1998 he fled to Thailand on a false passport, aware that police were on his tail following new allegations. He was arrested in June 2003 after returning to UK on a false passport. A bank employee had tipped the police off, following his credit card use in the UK. He was arrested while travelling on a train with his financial advisor and business associate; he was immediately rushed to hospital following chest complaints. He required heart surgery before being fit to stand in court. During Goad's ill-health Operation Emotion II had been under way by police and had persuaded 17 victims to testify at trial against him.

== Trial and sentence ==
Goad's trial took place at Plymouth Crown Court. Initially he pleaded not guilty to the charges and claimed he was sexually abused at a younger age. Eventually, following overwhelming evidence and comments from the judge to his legal defence, he pleaded guilty to two charges of indecent assault and 14 counts of rape. (Note: At the time of conviction rape was classed as sexual assault) At his sentencing, Martin Meeke QC stated "It is believed there has been no single defendant with more victims than this man". The court described him as a “voracious, calculating, predatory and violent homosexual paedophile” who sexually abused young boys over a 30-year period. Goad was sent to prison for life in October 2004.

== Death ==
Goad died of natural causes at HM Prison Albany on 20 October 2012.
