= Braybrook Street =

Street in Shepherd's Bush, London

Coordinates: 51.519729°N 0.247749°W

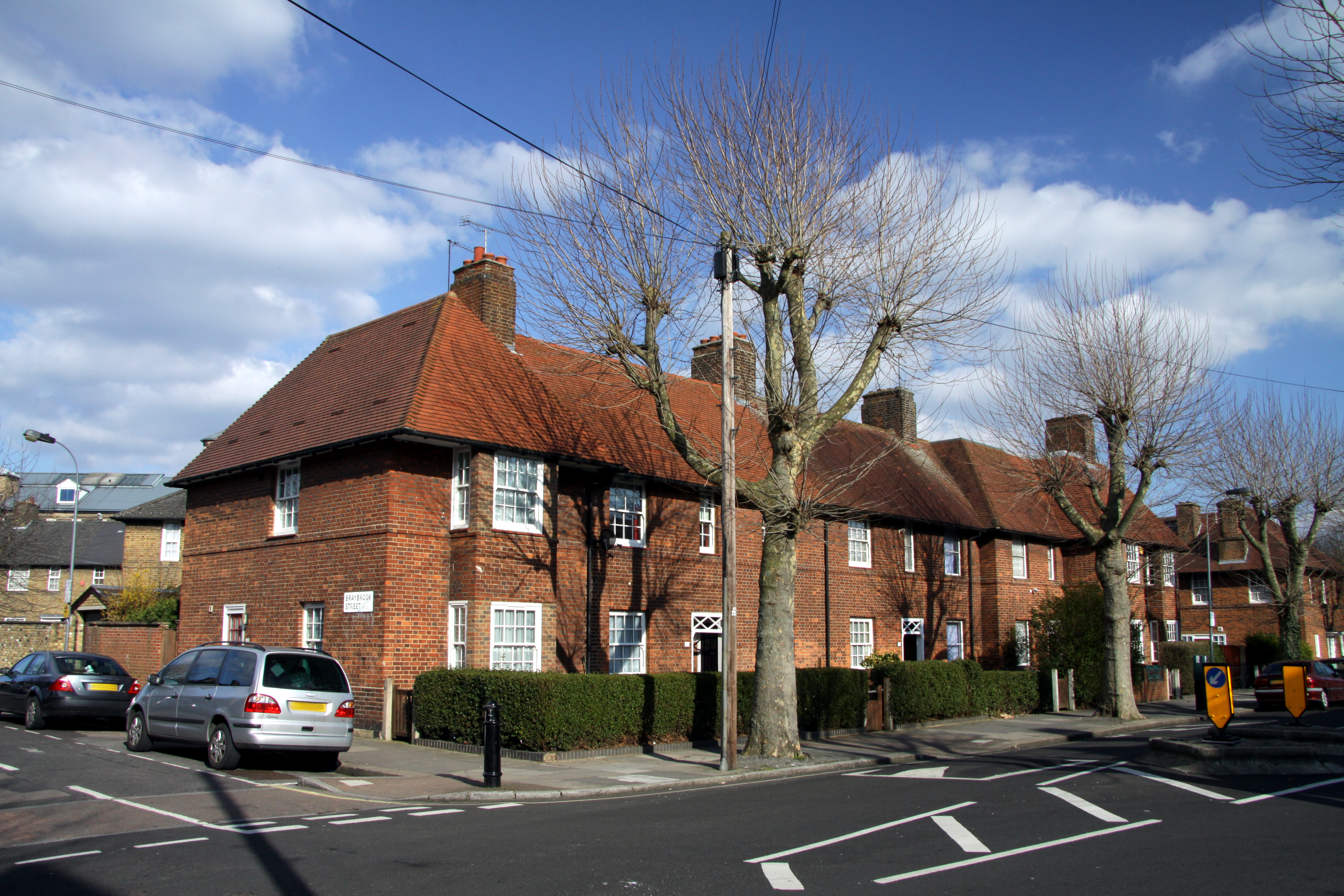
Braybrook Street (left) at its junction with Wulfstan Street.

Braybrook Street is a residential street in Shepherd's Bush, London. It runs along the west side of Wormwood Scrubs and the prison of the same name, and is close to East Acton Underground station.

The street was named after a Bishop of London, Robert Braybrooke. Other Bishops of London who gave their names to nearby streets were Mellitus, Earconwald, Osmund, Wulfstan, Gilbert Foliot, Richard FitzNeal, John Stokesley and Humphrey Henchman.

The street is notable as the location of the Massacre of Braybrook Street where three police officers were murdered by Harry Roberts and John Duddy in August 1966.
