= Dispersal prison =

Type of prison in the United Kingdom

The dispersal prisons are five secure prisons in the United Kingdom that house Category A prisoners. The idea of the prisons was initiated after a report submitted by Earl Mountbatten in 1966 after some notorious prison escapes. It was decided that special secure units should be built to enable the allocation of Category A prisoners to them, but to also allow the prison authorities the option to 'disperse' a prisoner to one of the other units at short notice. Whilst seven secure units were intended, the actual number has fluctuated over the years with a core selection of five still remaining.

== History ==
During the 1960s in Britain, several notorious and high-profile prisoners escaped from jails across the United Kingdom (Charles Wilson, Ronnie Biggs and George Blake). After the sensational escape of George Blake, a report was commissioned by the government to be chaired by Earl Mountbatten. (Note: Report of the Inquiry into Prison Escapes and Security, December 1966, by The Earl Mountbatten of Burma: implementation of treatment and rehabilitation of prisoners) The report recommended that all prisoners be categorised either A, B, C or D, according to their security risk, escape risk and danger to the general public. Category A prisoners were those deemed to be the worst and Category D prisoners were afforded the right to wander around the prison estate (within reason).

Mountbatten's proposal was for one fortress-style super-prison (called HMP Vectis on the Isle of Wight) where all the prisoners could be housed together in an 'Alcatraz-style' unit; however, following the Radzinowicz Report in 1968, (Note: The Radzinowicz Report 1968: The Regime for Long-Term Prisoners in Conditions of Maximum Security. Report of the Advisory Council on the Penal System) it was decided to build secure units to hold the Category A prisoners at seven locations. In this way, Category A prisoners could be 'dispersed' within any of the seven secure locations and the ability to move them at short notice was retained. The seven secure prisons were preceded by two Special Security Wings at Durham and Leicester prisons, but the two wings were not fit for purpose as they were in pre-existing jails and adapted from existing buildings which were not as secure as a purpose-built prison would be.

In early 2016, it was reported that the UK government was considering using just one unit to house all its Islamist Terrorists as per Mountbatten's original recommendation. Critics pointed out that this would lead to further radicalisation of the non-religious prison community. In 2016, eight high security prisons existed across England and Wales; Belmarsh, Frankland, Full Sutton, Long Lartin, Manchester, Wakefield, Whitemoor and Woodhill. Only five of these are classified as dispersal prisons; Frankland, Full Sutton, Long Lartin, Wakefield and Whitemoor with Belmarsh, Manchester and Woodhill being described as 'Core Local' prisons.

Arguments for and against the Dispersal system have been ongoing since first proposed by Radzinowicz in 1968. The idea of dispersal is that one prison is not overburdened with category A prisoners and the prisoners themselves can be accommodated within a larger prison population. The downside to this is that the system is expensive and that it places additional security on establishments housing Category B prisoners.

== The prisons ==
Name	Location	Opened as Dispersal	Notes	Date ceased as Dispersal
Albany	Isle of Wight	1970	Original planned location by Mountbatten for all Category A prisoners	1992
Belmarsh	London	1991	Was a dispersal site up to 2008; has a High Security Unit (HSU) that houses Category A prisoners in segregation from the other prison population so is not officially classed as a dispersal prison	2008
Frankland	County Durham	1983	The first purpose built Dispersal Prison and the largest in terms of inmate population (around 850 prisoners)	
Full Sutton	East Yorkshire	1987	Purpose-built high-security prison, houses 600 inmates	
Gartree	Leicestershire	1967	Gartree was changed to a Category B prison in 1992	1992
Hull	East Yorkshire	1969	Designated in 1969, removed from the Dispersal list in 1986	1986
Long Lartin	Worcestershire	1971	Upgraded prison to Category A in 1973	
Parkhurst	Isle of Wight	1966	Parkhurst ceased to be a Dispersal Prison after a prisoner escape in 1995	1995
Wakefield	West Yorkshire	1966	Designated as a Dispersal Prison in 1966; the longest serving of the original group	
Whitemoor	Cambridgeshire	1991	Opened in 1991 as a purpose built Category A prison	
