= Shepherd's Bush murders =

1966 murders

Coordinates: 51.51904°N 0.24487°W

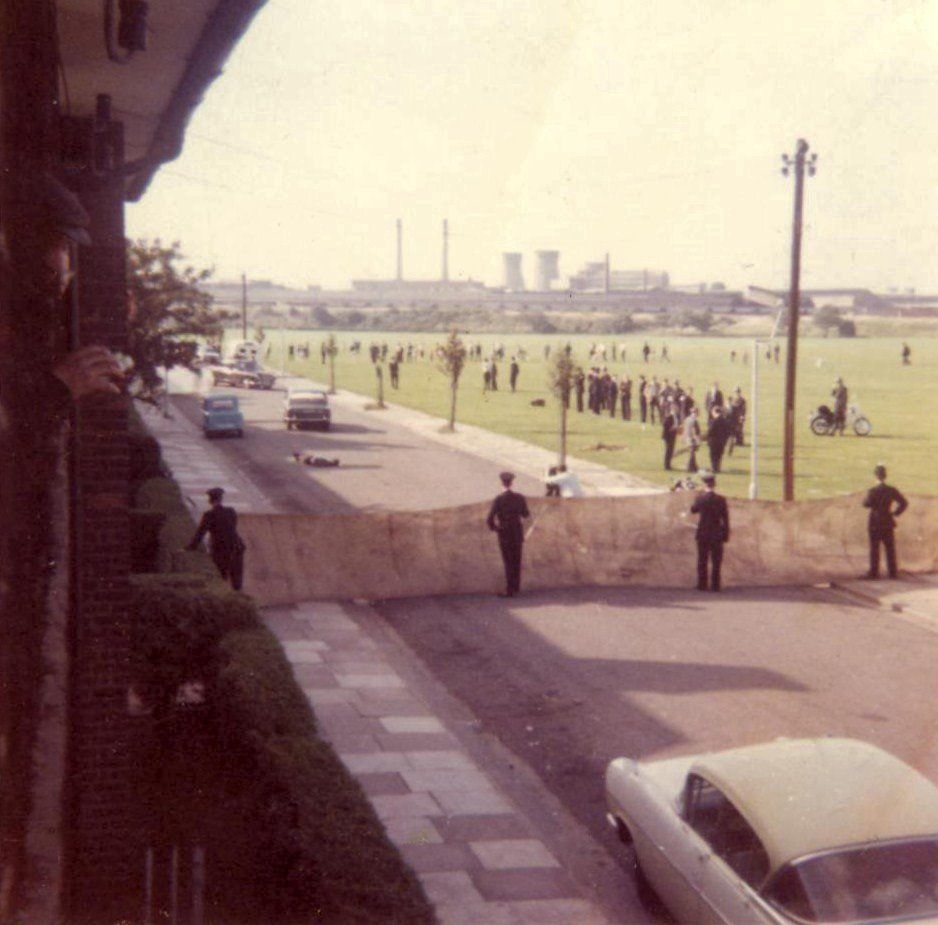
- The crime scene, including the Q-car and body of DC David Wombwell lying in the road
- Location: Braybrook Street, London, England, UK
- Date: 12 August 1966 around 3:15 pm
- Target: DS Christopher Head; DC David Wombwell; PC Geoffrey Fox
- Attack type: Massacre
- Weapons: Luger pistol, Webley .38 Service Revolver
- Deaths: 3 policemen
- Perpetrators: Harry Roberts; John Duddy; John Witney

The Shepherd's Bush murders, also known as the Massacre of Braybrook Street, involved the murder of three police officers in London by Harry Roberts, John Duddy and John Witney in 1966.

The officers had stopped to question the three men as they were sitting in a car on Braybrook Street, near Wormwood Scrubs prison. Roberts shot dead Temporary Detective Constable David Wombwell and Detective Sergeant Christopher Head, while Duddy shot dead Police Constable Geoffrey Fox.

The three men went on the run, initiating a large manhunt. All three were eventually arrested and subsequently sentenced to life imprisonment. Duddy died in prison in 1981. Witney, the driver of the criminals' vehicle, was also convicted of the murders; he was released from prison in 1991 but was killed in 1999 in an unconnected incident. Roberts became one of the longest-serving prisoners in British history, serving 48 years before his controversial release in 2014.

Public sympathy for the families of the victims resulted in the establishment of the Police Dependants' Trust – now amalgamated into the charity Police Care UK to assist the welfare of families of British police officers who have died in the line of duty.

== Murders ==
On 12 August 1966, a Metropolitan Police crew in an unmarked Triumph 2000 Q-car, registration plate GGW 87C and call sign Foxtrot One One, was patrolling East Acton (although the incident was always reported by the media as occurring in Shepherd's Bush) in West London. Detective Sergeant Christopher Tippett Head, aged 30, and Temporary Detective Constable David S Bertram Wombwell, aged 25, were both members of the Criminal Investigation Department (CID) based at Shepherd's Bush police station in F Division, which covered the Metropolitan Borough of Hammersmith. Their driver was Police Constable Geoffrey Roger Fox, aged 41, class 1 advanced driver and beat constable who had served for many years in F Division and frequently acted as a Q-car driver due to his vast local knowledge. All three officers were in plain clothes and had only just returned to normal duties after being involved in the investigation into the Hammersmith nude murders.

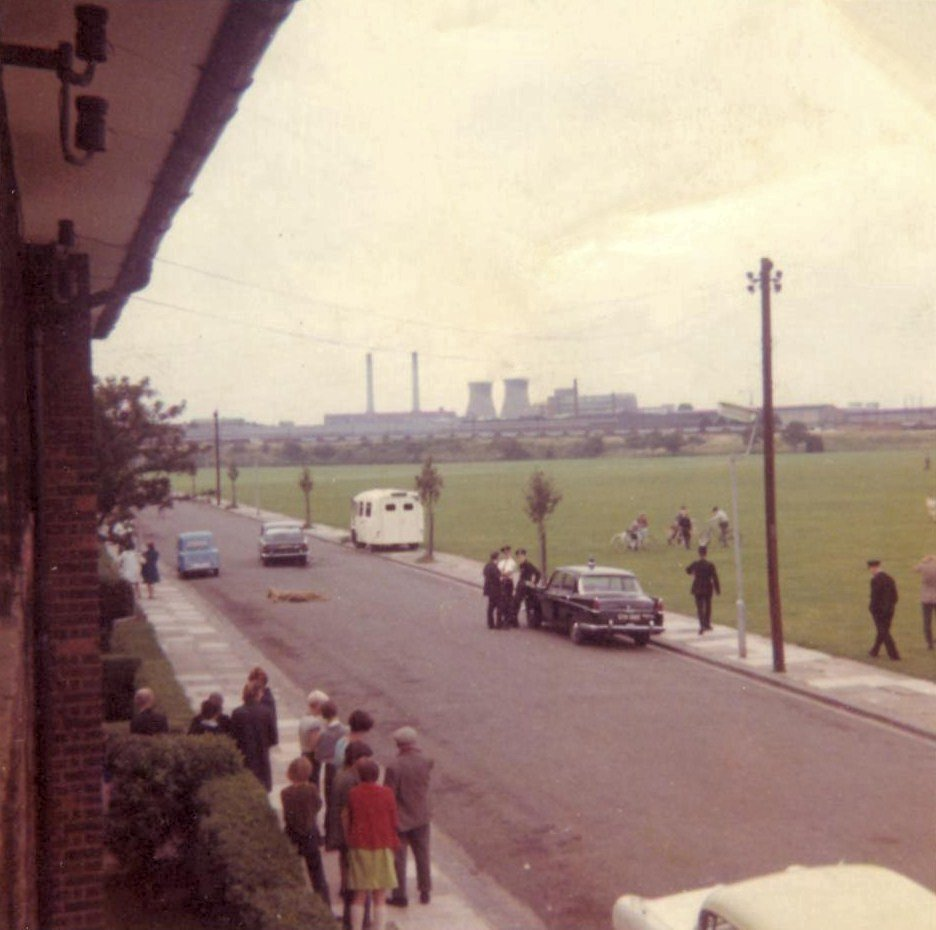
The Triumph 2000 police car on Braybrook Street following the shootings, with the body of DC Wombwell visible in the road.

At about 3:15 pm, the Q-car turned into Braybrook Street, a residential road on the Old Oak council estate which on one side bordered Wormwood Scrubs and Wormwood Scrubs prison. The officers spotted a battered blue Standard Vanguard estate van, registration plate PGT 726, parked at the roadside with three men sitting inside it. Since escapes were sometimes attempted from the prison with the assistance of getaway vehicles driven by accomplices, the officers decided to question the occupants. It is possible that PC Fox also recognised the van's driver, John Witney, as a known local criminal. The vehicle also had no tax disc on display, which was then a legal requirement.

DS Head and DC Wombwell exited the car and walked over to the van, where they questioned Witney about the lack of a tax disc. He replied that he had not yet obtained his MOT test certificate, which was required before a tax disc could be issued. DS Head asked Witney for his driving licence and vehicle insurance certificate; noticing that the latter had expired at midday that day, he told DC Wombwell to write down Witney's details and walked around to the other side of the van. Witney protested that he had been caught for the same offence only two weeks before and pleaded to be given a break. However, as he did so his front seat passenger, Harry Roberts, produced a Luger pistol and shot DC Wombwell in the face at point blank range, killing him instantly. DS Head ran back towards his car but Roberts gave chase and, after missing with the next shot, shot him in the head. John Duddy, the back seat passenger, also got out, grabbing a .38 Webley Service Revolver from the bag next to him (which also contained a third gun). He ran over to the Q-car and shot PC Fox three times through the window as he tried to reverse at speed towards him and Roberts, who also fired several shots at the police car. As he died, Fox's foot jerked down on the accelerator pedal causing the car to lurch forward over the prone body of DS Head, who was already dying of his wounds.

== Manhunt ==
Duddy and Roberts got back into the van and Witney reversed rapidly down a side street and pulled out onto Wulfstan Street before driving away at speed. However, a passer-by, suspicious of a car driving so fast near the prison, had written down the registration plate. Witney, the van's owner, was arrested at his home six hours after the incident. Following a tip-off, the van was discovered the next day in a lock-up garage rented by Witney under a railway bridge in Vauxhall. It contained some spent .38 cartridges and equipment that could be used for stealing cars. Initially Witney claimed that he had sold the van for £15 (equivalent to £200 in 2025) to an unknown man in a pub earlier in the day, but confessed on 14 August, admitting what had happened and naming his accomplices.

Duddy had fled to his native Glasgow but was arrested on 17 August using information obtained from his brother.

After meeting his common-law wife for money Roberts moved through Epping Forest then used a tented camp to hide out in Thorley Wood near Bishop's Stortford in Hertfordshire to avoid the huge manhunt. Until the cold winter weather set in he used his military training (he had served as a soldier during the Malayan Emergency) to avoid police capture for three months. A £1,000 reward (equivalent to £16,300 in 2025) was offered for information leading to his arrest. He was finally arrested on 15 November whilst sleeping in a disused airfield hangar on Blount's Farm, Sawbridgeworth near Bishop's Stortford. Roberts was familiar with the area as he had often visited it as a child with his mother.

== Attackers ==
The three attackers were John Edward 'Jack' Witney, John Duddy and Harry Roberts. Witney (1930–1999) was a known petty criminal with ten convictions for theft. He lived with his wife in a basement flat in Fernhead Road, Paddington.

Duddy (1928–1981) was a long-distance lorry driver. He had been in trouble for theft several times when he was younger. Immediately prior to the offence he had started to drink heavily and had met Roberts and Witney in a club.

Roberts (1936–2025) was a career criminal with convictions for attempted store-breaking, larceny and robbery with violence. He was a former soldier who had served in Malaya.

== Trial ==
The trial of Witney and Duddy began at the Old Bailey on 14 November but was almost immediately adjourned after Roberts's arrest so that the three men could be tried together. Roberts pleaded guilty to the murders of DS Head and DC Wombwell (but not that of PC Fox), while the other two defendants denied all charges. Only Witney testified in his own defence, saying that he and Duddy were terrified of Roberts. On 12 December 1966, after a trial lasting just six days, the three men were convicted of murder and possession of firearms and sentenced to life imprisonment. The jury took 30 minutes to reach their verdict. The judge, Mr Justice Glyn-Jones, recommended that they serve at least 30 years before becoming eligible for parole. He commented that the murders were "the most heinous crime to have been committed in this country for a generation or more".

== Reactions ==
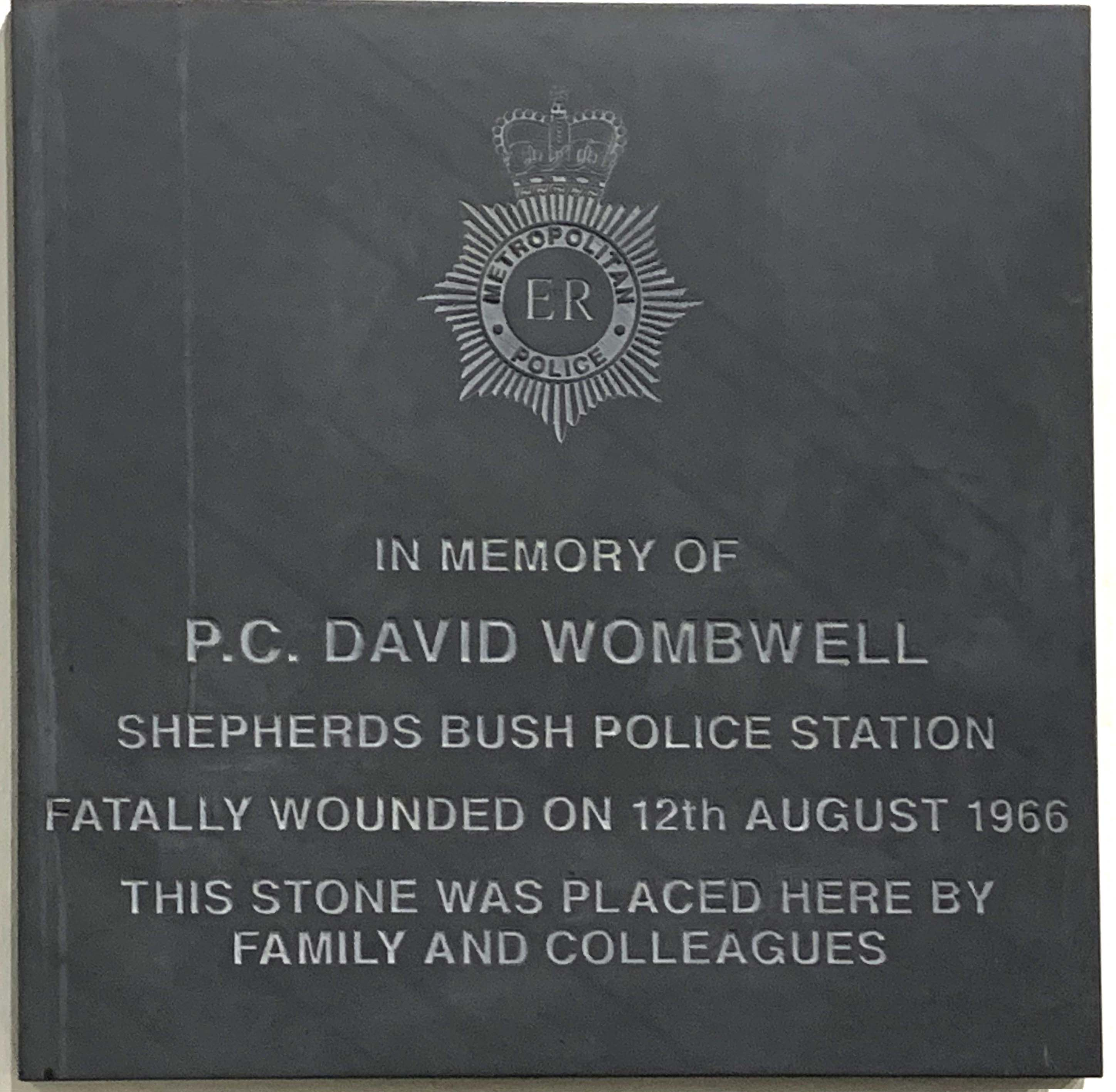
Memorial plaque to PC David Wombwell at St Stephen's Church, Shepherd's Bush

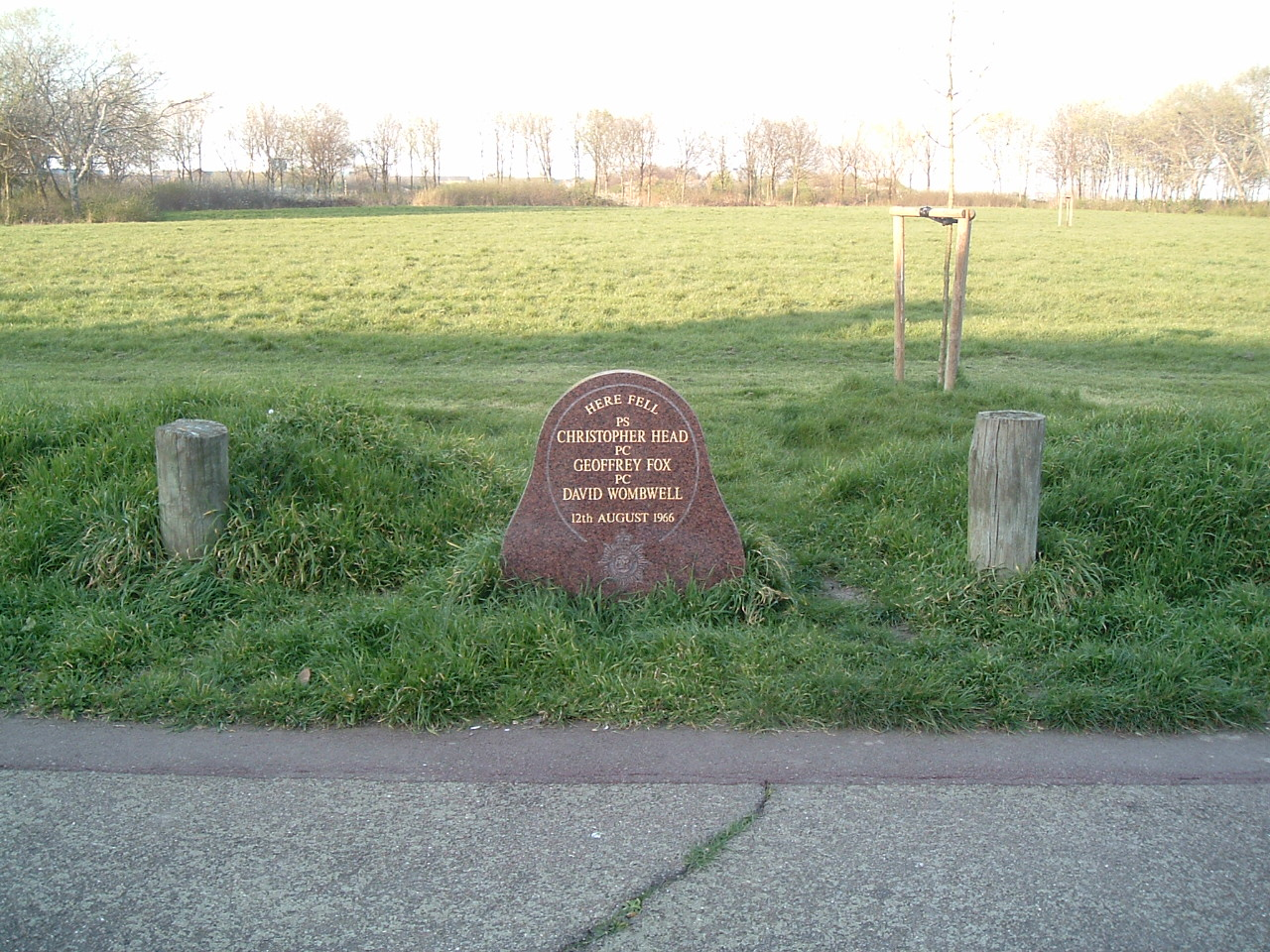
The memorial on Braybrook Street to DS Head, DC Wombwell and PC Fox

The murders caused outrage in the United Kingdom and there were calls for the reintroduction of the recently abolished death penalty and for an increase in the number of police officers trained to use firearms (British police officers are normally unarmed). The Metropolitan Police Firearms Wing was established soon after the incident.

Six hundred Metropolitan Police officers lined the route of the three victims' funeral procession in Shepherd's Bush and a memorial service in Westminster Abbey was attended by Prime Minister Harold Wilson, Leader of the Opposition Edward Heath and many other dignitaries, as well as thousands of police officers from all over the country. More than one thousand members of the public stood in mourning outside the Abbey. Holiday camp owner Billy Butlin donated £250,000 to a new Police Dependants' Trust, and it had soon raised more than £1 million.

In 1988 the Police Memorial Trust established a stone memorial to the three officers at the site of the incident in Braybrook Street.

== Post-conviction ==
Duddy died in Parkhurst prison on 8 February 1981.

Witney was released from prison in 1991, causing some controversy as he had not served the full 30 years recommended by the judge, and was thought to be the first adult to be released early on licence after killing a police officer. In August 1999, while at home in Horfield, Bristol, his flatmate beat him to death with a hammer. His flatmate was a heroin abuser and police ruled out any connection between his murder and the events of 1966.

With Duddy and Witney having both died, Roberts was still imprisoned more than 30 years into his life sentence, as one of Britain’s longest serving prisoners. It was reported in February 2009 that Roberts hoped to be freed from prison within months. After serving more than 42 years, and having already completed the first stage of a parole board hearing, he believed that his release was imminent. Roberts hoped a final hearing would find that, now in his seventies and having spent more than half of his life prison, he was no longer a risk to the public and that he would be granted parole. By this time, he had already served 12 years more than the minimum term recommended by his trial judge, who at the time of sentencing told Roberts that it was unlikely that any future Home Secretary would "ever think fit to show mercy by releasing you on licence ... This is one of those cases in which the sentence of imprisonment for 'life' may well be treated as meaning exactly what it says."

In October 2014, after 48 years in prison, the Parole Board for England and Wales decided that Harry Roberts should be paroled from his life sentence and he was released from prison on 11 November.

His release in 2014 caused outrage within the Police Federation of England and Wales, who demanded that such a murderer not be released. The then Metropolitan police commissioner, Bernard Hogan-Howe, also criticised the Parole Board decision to release Roberts. The daughter of one of the murdered police officers, PC Geoffrey Fox, said she was "sickened" to learn that Roberts was to be released without any prior warning. Mandy Fox described the decision as an "utter disgrace". The then mayor of London, Boris Johnson, said people in the city would be "absolutely sickened" by his release.

== See also ==
- List of British police officers killed in the line of duty

== Bibliography ==
- Braddon, Russell, "The Shepherd's Bush Murders" (from book Great Cases of Scotland Yard)
- Fido, Martin; Keith Skinner (1999). The Official Encyclopedia of Scotland Yard. London: Virgin Books. ISBN 0-7535-0515-0.
- Slipper, Jack (1982). Slipper of the Yard. London: Sidgwick & Jackson. ISBN 978-0-283-98702-1.
