= Chris Russell =

English cricketer

Personal information
- Full name: Christopher James Russell
- Born: 16 February 1989 (age 37); Newport, Isle of Wight, England
- Batting: Right-handed
- Bowling: Right-arm medium-fast

Domestic team information
- Years: Team
- 2010–2016: Worcestershire (squad no. 18)
- FC debut: 8 August 2012 Worcestershire v Warwickshire
- LA debut: 29 August 2010 Worcestershire v Unicorns

Career statistics
Competition	FC	LA	T20
Matches	18	10	12
Runs scored	129	4	6
Batting average	7.16	4.00	–
100s/50s	0/0	0/0	0/0
Top score	22	2	3*
Balls bowled	2,306	276	245
Wickets	38	7	17
Bowling average	41.21	41.14	23.29
5 wickets in innings	0	0	0
10 wickets in match	0	0	0
Best bowling	4/43	4/32	4/40
Catches/stumpings	4/–	5/–	6/–
- Source: ESPNcricinfo, 1 August 2016

Christopher James Russell (born 16 February 1989) is an English cricketer. Russell is a right-handed batsman who bowls right-arm medium-fast. He was born in Newport on the Isle of Wight.

Having played for the Worcestershire Second XI since 2008, Russell made his full debut for Worcestershire in a List A match against the Unicorns in the 2010 Clydesdale Bank 40, claiming his maiden List A wicket when he dismissed Chris Murtagh. He made a further appearance in that competition against Surrey. Russell didn't feature for Worcestershire in the 2011 season. A notable appearance in the 2012 season saw Russell gain match figures of 6–72 in a drawn two-day tour match against South Africa - only days after England had only managed to take two wickets in a five-day test match.
