= HM Prison Isle of Wight =

Prison on the Isle of Wight, UK

HMP Isle of Wight
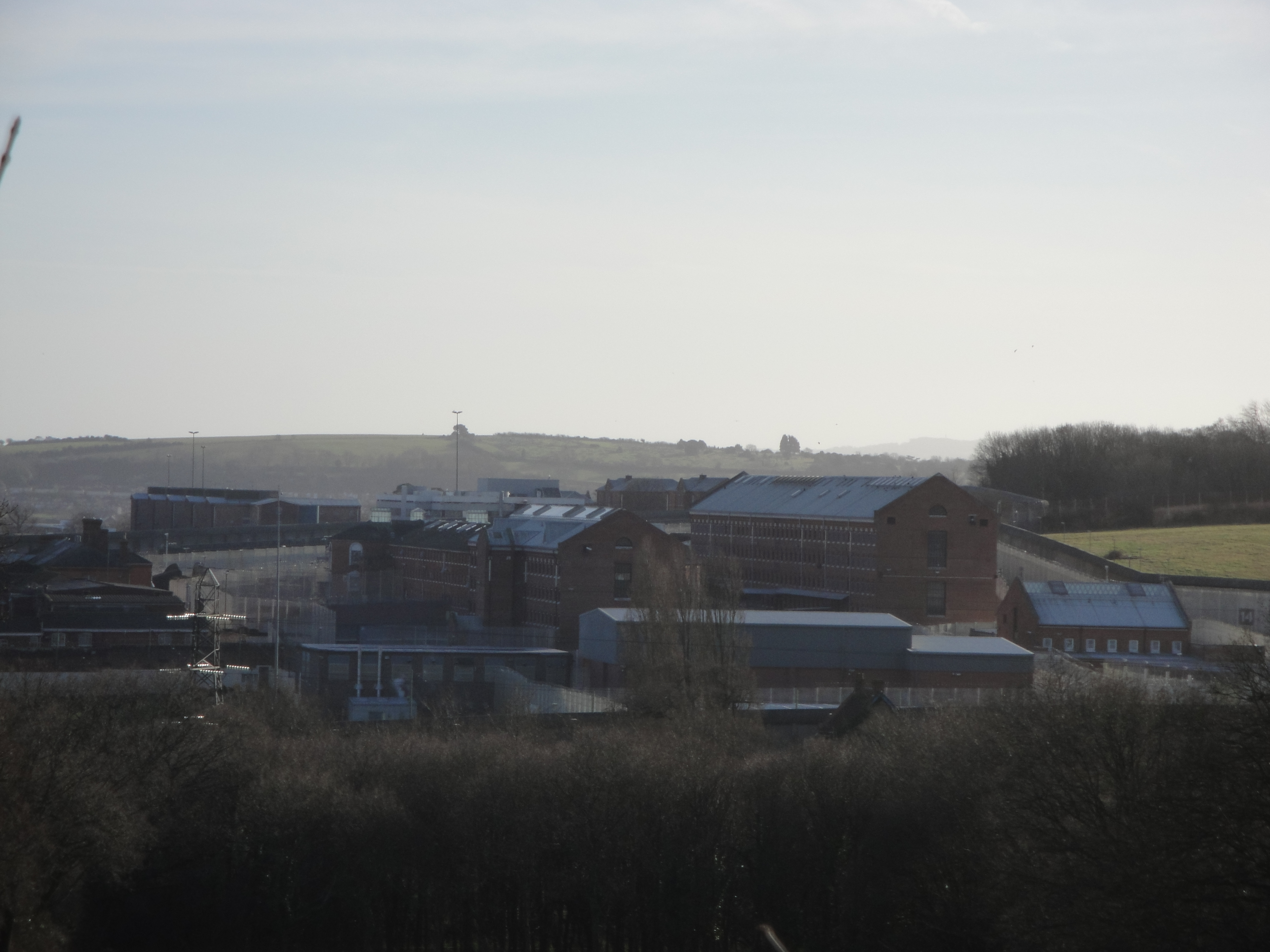
- HMP Isle of Wight (Parkhurst) viewed from Noke Common
- Interactive map of HMP Isle of Wight
- Location: Newport, Isle of Wight, England
- Security class: Adult Male/Category B
- Population: 1,700
- Opened: 2009
- Managed by: His Majesty's Prison Service
- Governor: Doug Graham
- Website: www.gov.uk/guidance/isle-of-wight-prison

HMP Isle of Wight is a prison on the Isle of Wight, UK, combining the two island prisons, Albany and Parkhurst. On 1 April 2009, the two prisons (along with Camp Hill which closed in 2013) were merged with each site retaining their old names. Across the two sites there are over 1,000 prisoners, making it one of the largest prisons in the country.

== History ==
The idea for combining management of the three prisons on the island was suggested in October 2008 in order to improve efficiency. The plans attracted criticism from prison officers who feared for their jobs and said that with fewer staff on duty, safety was being put at risk. The chairman of the Prison Officer's Association said that the principal motivation was to save around £1.1 million through natural wastage and the scrapping of eight principal officers' posts. On announcement of the proposal, suggested names for the new prison included HMP Solent, HMP Mountbatten, HMP Vectis and the tongue-in-cheek suggestion "Barry Island" after the governor sent to implement the cluster, Barry Greenberry, who left in October 2010 to work for the private sector. However, none were implemented and the name HMP Isle of Wight was announced in March 2009. It was stated that the individual sites would retain their names.

HMP Isle of Wight was officially launched on 1 April 2009. On the day of the launch, the prison union criticised the change, stating that it had been done to save money and would endanger the public. The Ministry of Justice stated that similar schemes such as the Isle of Sheppey had proved a success and that, although there would be a saving of around £1 million, this would be achieved through economies and there was no added danger to the public. The main motivation of "clustering", as the process is known, is cost cutting.

In May 2010 a man dressed as Snoopy and an accomplice failed in their attempt to enter the Albany site in order to free a prisoner. The costumed man carried a water gun. The inmate the men were trying to free was in the Camp Hill site.

In January 2013, the Ministry of Justice announced that the Camp Hill site would close, with a reduction of 595 places. The site formally closed in March 2013.

== Sites ==
Site	Opened	Type	Operational capacity	Intake
Albany	1967	Adult male/Category B	566	Category B Sex offenders or vulnerable prisoners with sentences of four years or more, with at least 18 months left to serve and eligible for rehabilitation activities.
Parkhurst	1805	Adult male/Category B	497	Sentenced prisoners serving over four years, including vulnerable prisoners, stage 1 and 2 life sentence prisoners and Isle of Wight residents on remand.
