= Harry Roberts (criminal) =

English criminal (1936–2025)

- Born: 21 July 1936; Wanstead, East London, England
- Died: 13 December 2025 (aged 89)
- Other name: Ronald Ernest Hall
- Occupation: Carpenter
- Parent(s): Harry Roberts; Dorothy Roberts
- Status: Released on lifelong licence
- Conviction: Murder
- Penalty: Life imprisonment

Harry Maurice Roberts (21 July 1936 – 13 December 2025) was an English career criminal and murderer who in 1966 instigated the Shepherd's Bush murders, in which three police officers were shot dead in London. The murders took place after plainclothes officers approached a Standard Vanguard estate car, in which Roberts and two other men were sitting in Braybrook Street near Wormwood Scrubs prison in London. He killed two officers, while one of his accomplices shot dead the third.

After Roberts spent nearly 48 years in prison, in 2014 the Parole Board for England and Wales approved his release, at the age of 78. Having far exceeded his minimum term of 30 years, he was one of the United Kingdom's longest-serving prisoners, having remained in custody since 1966. His release was controversial due to the nature of his crime.

== Early life ==
Roberts was born in Wanstead, then part of Essex, on 21 July 1936, where his parents ran The George public house. As a child he became involved in crime by helping his mother sell stolen goods on the black market.

In his late teens, Roberts was sentenced to detention after using an iron bar to attack a shopkeeper during a robbery. Roberts served a 19-month sentence inside Gaynes Hall borstal, and was released in January 1956.

One week after leaving the borstal, Roberts was called up for national service and joined the Rifle Brigade (Prince Consort's Own), with whom he saw action during the Mau Mau uprising and Malayan Emergency. Of his service in the jungle he said that this was where he learned to kill and that he had "personally killed at least four". Roberts has claimed that he reached the rank of sergeant while in the Army although others have given his rank as lance corporal. Journalist and former armed robber John McVicar said that Roberts "gloated" about his killings while in prison, and had "acquired a taste for killing prisoners [of war] on the orders of his officers" in the Army.

After leaving the Army, Roberts returned to his criminal activities, and in partnership with Jack Witney carried out "dozens" of armed robberies, targeting bookmakers, post offices and banks. He said, "The most I earned was £1,000 from a single job. Witney was the eldest, the boss: he knew the best places to rob. [John] Duddy joined us later." In 1959 Roberts and an accomplice posed as tax inspectors to gain entry into the home of an elderly man. The man was bound, robbed, and beaten about the head with a glass decanter. Roberts was arrested, and at his trial the judge, John Maude QC, said, "You are a brutal thug. You came very near the rope this time. It is to be hoped you do not appear before us again." Roberts received a sentence of seven years.

== Shepherd's Bush murders ==
Following the shootings in August 1966 of 41-year-old Police Constable Geoffrey Fox, Detective Sergeant Christopher Head, aged 30, and 25-year-old Temporary Detective Constable David Wombwell in Shepherd's Bush, west London, to avoid capture Roberts used a tent to hide in Thorley Wood near Bishop's Stortford, Hertfordshire, until the winter set in and he moved inside farm buildings. He was familiar with the area from visits there as a child. A £1,000 reward was offered for information leading to his arrest. Roberts used his military training to evade capture for 96 days, but was finally caught by police while sleeping rough in a disused airfield hangar on Blount's Farm, Sawbridgeworth, near Bishop's Stortford in Hertfordshire.

== Trial and sentence ==
Roberts was convicted of all three murders and sentenced in December 1966 to life imprisonment with a recommended minimum term of 30 years.

30 years was the longest term ever given at the time, having only been handed out to the Great Train Robbers.

=== Appeal ===
Roberts (along with Witney) had their appeals against conviction and sentence heard at the Court of Criminal Appeal on 31 May 1967.

== Imprisonment ==
While in prison, Roberts made several attempts to escape, including fashioning a fake pistol or pistols out of cotton reels and wax; he also acquired a budgie so that he could use wire from its cage in an escape attempt.

In 2001, Roberts was moved to an open prison but was returned to a closed prison within months after allegations that he was involved in drug dealing and contraband smuggling. Author Kate Kray, who interviewed Roberts for her book Natural Born Killers (1999, ISBN 1857823826), said that he had no remorse for his victims and recreated the murders in art and pastry decorations, making apple pies and decorating them with pastry cut-outs of policemen being shot. Kray said that he also produced "precisely drawn and coloured" paintings depicting someone shooting a policeman.

== Parole hearings and related matters ==
In 2005, Roberts failed in his appeal to the House of Lords over the use of secret evidence to keep him in prison. The evidence had been obtained by tapping private phone calls between Roberts and his solicitor.

In September 2006, 70-year-old Roberts applied for a judicial review over apparent delays by the parole board in reaching a decision to free him by the end of the year. In December 2006, he was again turned down for parole. On 29 June 2007, he was given leave to seek a High Court judicial review over his failed parole bid, with the judge saying his case "was of great public interest".

It was reported in February 2009 that Roberts hoped to be freed from prison within months, having already served 42 years in jail and completing the first stage of a parole board hearing; he believed this would pave the way for his release. Roberts hoped a final hearing would find that at the age of 72 he was no longer a risk to the public and that the parole board would order his immediate release. At this time he had already served 12 years more than the minimum term recommended by his trial judge who at the time of sentencing told Roberts that it was unlikely that any future Home Secretary would "ever think fit to show mercy by releasing you on licence... This is one of those cases in which the sentence of imprisonment for 'life' may well be treated as meaning exactly what it says".

Supporters of Roberts had previously claimed that successive Home Secretaries have blocked his release for political reasons because of fears of a public backlash. Peter Smyth, chairman of the Metropolitan Police Federation, said that there would be widespread anger among serving and former officers. Legal sources said they believed that the parole board was likely to recommend that he was eligible for an open prison as a way of preparing him for release. Jack Straw, the former Justice Secretary, retained the power to reject a parole board recommendation that Roberts be moved to an open prison but he could not block a decision by the board to order his release.

In April 2009, it was alleged by the owners of an animal sanctuary where Roberts was working on day release, that he made violent threats to them.

In October 2014, the Parole Board for England and Wales approved his release at an unspecified later date. Roberts was released on 11 November 2014 after serving 48 years in prison (from 15 November 1966). He was 78.

== Death ==
Roberts died after a short illness in hospital, on 13 December 2025, at the age of 89.

== Cultural impact ==
Roberts became a cult figure among some anarchists and football hooligans, with the chant "Harry Roberts is our friend, is our friend, is our friend. Harry Roberts is our friend, he kills coppers. Let him out to kill some more, kill some more, kill some more, let him out to kill some more, Harry Roberts", as well as "He shot three down in Shepherd's Bush, Shepherd's Bush, Shepherd's Bush. He shot three down in Shepherd's Bush, our mate Harry" (to the tune of "London Bridge Is Falling Down"), which originated with groups of young people outside Shepherd's Bush police station after Roberts had been arrested.

There have been artistic representations of Roberts. The character of Billy Porter in the 2001 novel He Kills Coppers by Jake Arnott, and the 2008 television adaptation, is based on Roberts.

In the song "Happiness Is Just a Chant Away", Chumbawamba sing the tune of the Hare Krishna mantra with the words replaced with "Harry Roberts". The band also recorded a single dedicated to him titled "Hat Trick for Harry", but it was not released.

== See also ==
- List of longest prison sentences served
