= HM Prison Parkhurst =

Site of HM Prison Isle of Wight

Coordinates: 50°42′55″N 1°18′30″W

HMP Parkhurst
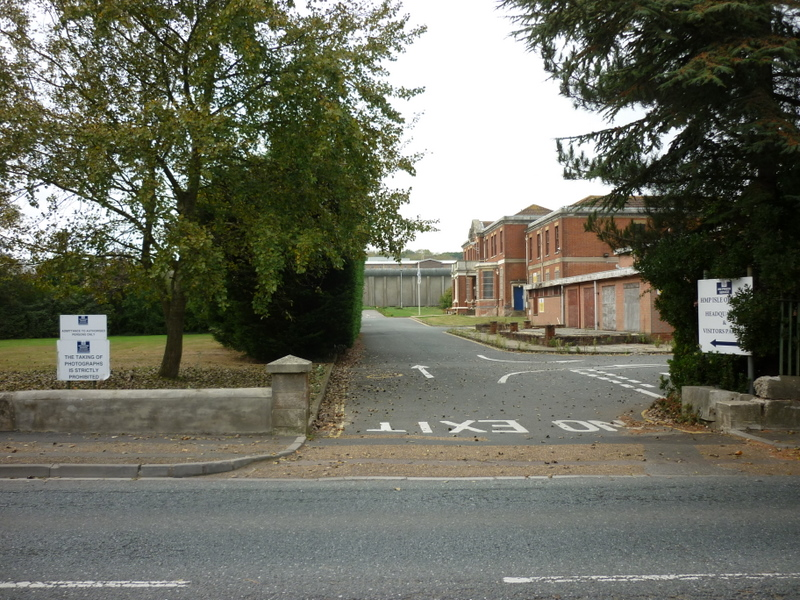
- Entrance to HMP Parkhurst
- Interactive map of HMP Parkhurst
- Location: Parkhurst, Isle of Wight
- Security class: Adult Male/Category B
- Population: 497 (August 2008)
- Opened: 1805
- Managed by: HM Prison Services
- Governor: Doug Graham
- Website: www.gov.uk/guidance/isle-of-wight-prison

HM Prison Parkhurst is a Category B men's prison located in Parkhurst on the Isle of Wight, and is operated by His Majesty's Prison Service. Parkhurst prison is one of two formerly separate prisons that today make up HMP Isle of Wight, the other being Albany.

== History ==
Parkhurst as an institution began in 1778, originally serving as a military hospital and children's asylum. By 1838, it had transformed into a prison for children. Nearly 1500 boys between the ages of 12 and 18 were sent to various colonies in Australia and New Zealand. In 1842 and 1843, 123 Parkhurst apprentices were sent to the Colony of New Zealand. The Swan River Colony (Western Australia) received 234 apprentices between 1842 and 1849, then chose to accept adult convicts as well. Victoria and Tasmania also received "Parkhurst Boys", who were always referred to officially as "apprentices", not convicts. During this period, Parkhurst Prison Governor Captain George Hall (in office from 1843 to 1861) employed the boys to make bricks for the construction of the C and M block wings of the prison building.

From its early days as a prison for young offenders, Parkhurst faced severe criticism from the public, politicians and the press due to its harsh regime (including the use of leg irons initially). The prison became a focal point for reformers, most notably Mary Carpenter (1807–1877), who campaigned against the use of imprisonment for children.

In 1966, Parkhurst became one of the few top-security prisons in the United Kingdom, known as "Dispersals", because they separated more troublesome prisoners rather than housing them all together in one place. However, it lost its "Dispersal" status in 1995. In 2009, Parkhurst merged with HM Prison Albany to form super-prison HM Prison Isle of Wight, with both sites retaining their original name.

=== 1995 escape ===
On 3 January 1995, three prisoners (two murderers and a blackmailer) escaped from Parkhurst prison and enjoyed four days of freedom before being recaptured. One of the escapees, Keith Rose, was an amateur pilot. During those four days, the escapees lived rough in a shed in a garden in Ryde, after failing to steal a plane from the local flying club.

A documentary entitled Britain's Island Fortress was produced about this daring prison escape, and it was featured in the National Geographic Channel's Breakout documentary series.

== Notable inmates ==
Many high-profile criminals have been incarcerated at Parkhurst, including Lord William Beauchamp Nevill; the Yorkshire Ripper, Peter Sutcliffe; Moors Murderer Ian Brady; drug smuggler Terrance John Clark, the Teacup Poisoner, Graham Young; and the Kray twins.

Michael Gaughan died at Parkhurst prison after a 64-day hunger strike. In December 1971, Gaughan had been sentenced at the Old Bailey to seven years imprisonment for his involvement in an IRA bank robbery in Hornsey, north London, which yielded £530 (equivalent to £6,700 in 2025). He was also convicted for the possession of two revolvers. On 31 March 1974, Gaughan went on hunger strike demanding political status. At this time, British policy was to force-feed hunger strikers. Over the course of his protest, Gaughan was force-fed 17 times. The last time he was force-fed was the night before his death on Sunday, 2 June. He died on Monday 3 June 1974, at the age of 24.

War criminal Radovan Karadžić has been serving a life sentence at Parkhurst since May 2021 for the Bosnian genocide during his presidency.
