= Most Evil Killers =

British true crime television show

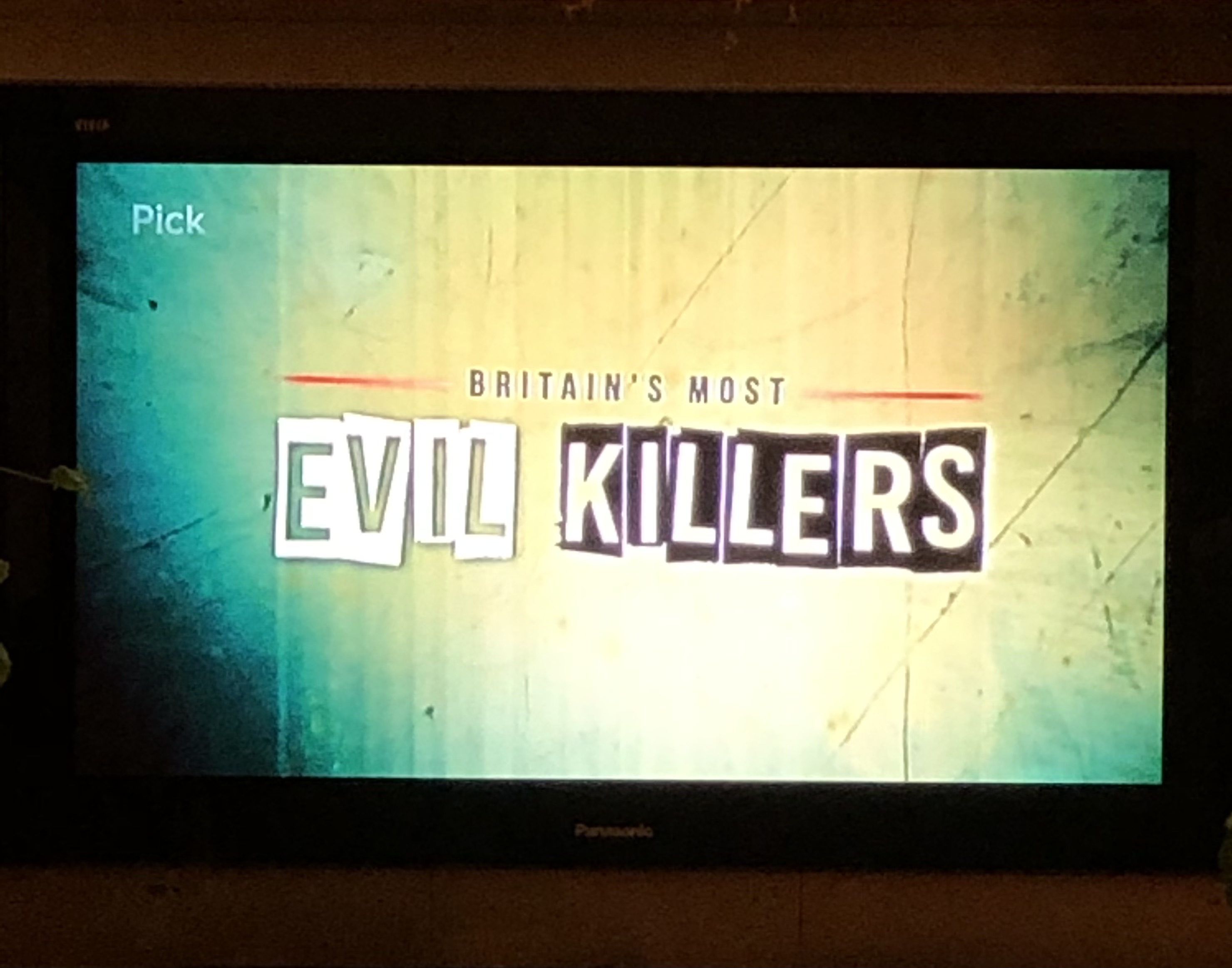
- Narrated by: Fred Dinenage
- Country of origin: United Kingdom
- Original language: English
- No. of series: 10

Production
- Running time: 60 minutes (inc. adverts)

Original release
- Network: Sky Mix
- Release: 2017 – present

Britain's Most Evil Killers, World's Most Evil Killers and Ireland's Most Evil Killers are British crime television programmes on Sky Mix (formerly Pick). First aired in 2017, the series are narrated by Fred Dinenage, and focus on the most notorious and depraved serial killers and murderers that were convicted during the past 50 years.

== Format overview ==
Each episode examines the case of a selected murderer, starting from an overview of the committed crime, the background, evidences collected and a number of interviews with police investigators, reporters, family members and relatives of the victims, to explain the facts in detail.

The series synopsis include expert examinations and evaluations from main recurring specialists throughout the episodes - journalist and crime author Geoffrey Wansell, and for the first seven series professor of criminology Elizabeth Yardley, then from series eight, forensic criminologist Jane Monckton-Smith - along with other criminologists, criminal psychologists, lawyers, journalists, reporters, law enforcement officers.

Statements from the investigations, reports from the trial, and the final conviction are outlined at the end of each episode, with a closing sentence from the narrator confirming why the profiled murderer shall always be remembered as one of the most evil killers.

== Criticism ==
The series received significant criticism, including it being described as "purely sensationalist," with reviewers often noting its exploitative tendency to transform human tragedy into "macabre, low-budget entertainment."

Reviewers argued the series serves as little more than a "tabloid-style spectacle" that prioritises shock value over genuine empathy. Critics have pointed out that the programme possesses "no real documentary merit," as it consistently fails to offer any sociological or psychological analysis found in more rigorous true crime studies.

By focusing on the "depravity" of the perpetrators through theatrical narration and graphic recreations, the show ultimately masks its lack of educational substance with a thin, performatively respectful veneer.

== Programmes ==
- Britain's Most Evil Killers
- World's Most Evil Killers
- Ireland's Most Evil Killers
- World’s Most Evil Women
- World’s Most Evil Prisoners

== Britain’s Most Evil Killers ==
| Series | Start date | End date | Episodes |
|---|---|---|---|
| 1 | 2017 | 2017 | 12 |
| 2 | 2018 | 2018 | 10 |
| 3 | 2019 | 2019 | 10 |
| 4 | 2020 | 2020 | 10 |
| 5 | 2020 | 2021 | 10 |
| 6 | 2021 | 2021 | 10 |
| 7 | 2022 | 2022 | 10 |
| 8 | 2023 | 2023 | 5 |
| 9 | 2024 | 2024 | 10 |
| 10 | 2025 | 2026 | 10 |

=== Series 1 ===
- S01E01 Steve Wright
- S01E02 Peter Sutcliffe
- S01E03 Ian Huntley
- S01E04 Fred & Rose West
- S01E05 Levi Bellfield
- S01E06 Joanna Dennehy
- S01E07 Stephen Griffiths
- S01E08 Dennis Nilsen
- S01E09 Stuart Hazell
- S01E10 Peter Tobin
- S01E11 Michael Ryan
- S01E12 Beverley Allitt

=== Series 2 ===
- S02E01 Mick Philpott
- S02E02 Mark Bridger
- S02E03 Stephen Port
- S02E04 Raoul Moat
- S02E05 Roy Whiting
- S02E06 John Duffy & David Mulcahy
- S02E07 Tracie Andrews
- S02E08 Steven Grieveson
- S02E09 Stefano Brizzi
- S02E010 Danilo Restivo

=== Series 3 ===
- S03E01 Vincent Tabak
- S03E02 Robert Black
- S03E03 Angus Sinclair
- S03E04 Trevor Hardy
- S03E05 David Heiss
- S03E06 John Cooper
- S03E07 Colin Ireland
- S03E08 Christopher Halliwell
- S03E09 Derrick Bird
- S03E010 Mark Hobson

=== Series 4 ===
- S04E01 Harold Shipman
- S04E02 Robert Napper
- S04E03 Stephen Seddon
- S04E04 Dale Cregan
- S04E05 Anthony Arkwright
- S04E06 John Sweeney
- S04E07 Andrzej Kunowski
- S04E08 Arthur Hutchinson
- S04E09 Peter Moore
- S04E010 Andrew Dawson

=== Series 5 ===
- S05E01 Stephen Farrow
- S05E02 Victor Farrant
- S05E03 Kenneth Regan & William Horncy
- S05E04 Russell Bishop
- S05E05 Phillip Austin
- S05E06 Jason Marshall
- S05E07 Sabah Khan
- S05E08 Colin Pitchfork
- S05E09 Ali Qazimaj
- S05E10 Billy Dunlop

=== Series 6 ===
- S06E01 Stuart Campbell
- S06E02 Trimaan "Harry" Dhillon
- S06E03 Jamie Reynolds
- S06E04 Sarah Williams & Katrina Walsh
- S06E05 Lee Ford
- S06E06 Pawel Relowicz
- S06E07 Daniel Gonzalez
- S06E08 Geoffrey Evans and John Shaw
- S06E09 Mark Martin
- S06E10 Malcolm Green

=== Series 7 ===
- S07E01 Lewis Daynes
- S07E02 Ben Field
- S07E03 Nathan Matthews
- S07E04 John Cannan
- S07E05 David Bieber
- S07E06 Ian Stewart
- S07E07 Zahid Zaman
- S07E08 Stephen Unwin & William McFall
- S07E09 Colin Campbell
- S07E10 Adrian Prout

=== Series 8 ===
- S08E01 Harry Jarvis
- S08E02 Graham Coutts
- S08E03 Jordan Monaghan
- S08E04 Danville Neil
- S08E05 Nicholas Burton

=== Series 9 ===
- S09E01 Adam Whelehan
- S09E02 Gavin McGuire
- S09E03 Robert Howard
- S09E04 Graham McGill
- S09E05 Anthony Russell
- S09E06 Hassan Al Shatanawi
- S09E07 Maria Pearson
- S09E08 Johnny Miller
- S09E09 Derek Brown
- S09E10 Christopher McGowan

=== Series 10 ===
- S10E01 Lakhvir Singh
- S10E02 Attila Ban
- S10E03 Paul Taylor
- S10E04 George Naylor
- S10E05 Philip Hegarty
- S10E06 Wilbert Dyce
- S10E07 Barry Prudom
- S10E08 David Baxendale
- S10E09 Paul McNaughton
- S10E10 Tariq Rehman

== World’s Most Evil Killers ==
| Series | Start date | End date | Episodes |
|---|---|---|---|
| 1 | 2018 | 2018 | 8 |
| 2 | 2018 | 2018 | 10 |
| 3 | 2019 | 2020 | 10 |
| 4 | 2020 | 2020 | 10 |
| 5 | 2021 | 2021 | 10 |
| 6 | 2021 | 2021 | 10 |
| 7 | 2022 | 2023 | 10 |
| 8 | 2023 | 2024 | 10 |
| 9 | 2024 | 2025 | 10 |
| 10 | 2025 | 2026 | 10 |

=== Series 1 ===
- S01E01 Fritz Honka
- S01E02 Joachim Kroll
- S01E03 Volker Eckert
- S01E04 Marc Dutroux
- S01E05 John Wayne Gacy
- S01E06 Jeffrey Dahmer
- S01E07 Ed Gein
- S01E08 Thierry Paulin

=== Series 2 ===
- S02E01 Edmund Kemper
- S02E02 Richard Ramirez
- S02E03 Dorothea Puente
- S02E04 Charles Ng & Leonard Lake
- S02E05 Cary Stayner
- S02E06 Rodney Alcala
- S02E07 Horst Kröner
- S02E08 Wolfgang Schmidt
- S02E09 Jack Unterweger
- S02E10 Paweł Tuchlin

=== Series 3 ===
- S03E01 Ted Bundy
- S03E02 Aileen Wuornos
- S03E03 Bobby Joe Long
- S03E04 Gary Ridgway
- S03E05 Dennis Rader
- S03E06 Diane Downs
- S03E07 Robert Berdella
- S03E08 Robert Lee Yates
- S03E09 Danny Rolling
- S03E10 Karol Kot

=== Series 4 ===
- S04E01 Todd Kohlhepp
- S04E02 David Berkowitz
- S04E03 Robert Ben Rhoades
- S04E04 William Suff
- S04E05 Christopher Hightower
- S04E06 Sante Kimes & Kenneth Kimes
- S04E07 Richard Chase
- S04E08 Angel Maturino Resendiz
- S04E09 The Hillside Stranglers (Kenneth Bianchi & Angelo Buono Jr.)
- S04E10 Daniel Lee Siebert

=== Series 5 ===
- S05E01 Lonnie Franklin
- S05E02 William Bonin
- S05E03 Jerry Brudos
- S05E04 Keith Jesperson
- S05E05 Arthur Shawcross
- S05E06 Doug Clark & Carol Bundy
- S05E07 Patrick Kearney
- S05E08 Dayton Leroy Rogers
- S05E09 Richard Roszkowski
- S05E10 Cesar Barone

=== Series 6 ===
- S06E01 John Allen Muhammad & Lee Boyd Malvo
- S06E02 Robert Pickton
- S06E03 Sean Vincent Gillis
- S06E04 Donald Gene Miller
- S06E05 Judy Buenoano
- S06E06 Gary Ray Bowles
- S06E07 Derrick Todd Lee
- S06E08 Velma Barfield
- S06E09 Chester Turner
- S06E10 Genene Jones

=== Series 7 ===
- S07E01 Jorge Avila-Torrez
- S07E02 Robert Hansen
- S07E03 Heriberto Seda
- S07E04 Charles Albright
- S07E05 Joshua Wade
- S07E06 Anthony Shore
- S07E07 Mark Goudeau
- S07E08 Paul Runge
- S07E09 Ronald Dominique
- S07E10 Paul Michael Stephani

=== Series 8 ===
- S08E01 Lester Jones
- S08E02 Jerald Wingeart
- S08E03 John Eric Armstrong
- S08E04 Richard Biegenwald
- S08E05 Richard Kuklinski
- S08E06 Richard Paul White
- S08E07 Billy Mansfield
- S08E08 Randy Kraft
- S08E09 Wayne Adam Ford
- S08E10 Steven Dean Gordon

=== Series 9 ===
- S09E01 Glen McCurley
- S09E02 William Devin Howell
- S09E03 Michael Bruce Ross
- S09E04 Donald Henry Gaskins
- S09E05 Wayne Williams
- S09E06 David Marmolejo
- S09E07 Emanuel Lovell Webb
- S09E08 Westley Allan Dodd
- S09E09 Joel Rifkin
- S09E10 Charles Cullen

=== Series 10 ===
- S10E01 Gregory Green
- S10E02 Benjamin Atkins
- S10E03 Edward Wayne Edwards
- S10E04 Kenneth Jackson
- S10E05 Leslie Allen Williams
- S10E06 Edward Covington
- S10E07 James Randall
- S10E08 Granville Ritchie
- S10E09 Robert Honsch
- S10E10 Diane & Rachel Staudte

== Ireland’s Most Evil Killers ==
| Series | Start date | End date | Episodes |
|---|---|---|---|
| 1 | 2023 | 2023 | 5 |

- S01E01 Joe O'Reilly
- S01E02 Colin Whelan
- S01E03 Charlotte and Linda Mulhall
- S01E04 Catherine Nevin
- S01E05 Eric Locke

== World’s Most Evil Women ==
| Series | Start date | End date | Episodes |
|---|---|---|---|
| 1 | 2026 | 2026 | 10 |

- S01E01 Amanda Taylor
- S01E02 Jennifer Faith
- S01E03 Brenda Delgado
- S01E04 Sarah Hartsfield
- S01E05 Nancy Brophy
- S01E06 Marcy Oglesby
- S01E07 Marcia Eubank
- S01E08 Pamela Moss
- S01E09 Natalie Bennett
- S01E010 Dena Thompson

== World’s Most Evil Prisoners ==
| Series | Start date | End date | Episodes |
|---|---|---|---|
| 1 | 2024 | 2024 | 10 |
| 2 | 2025 | 2025 | 10 |
| 3 | 2026 | 2026 | 10 |

=== Series 1 ===
- S01E01 Gary Vinter
- S01E02 James O’Rourke
- S01E03 Joanne Dennehy
- S01E04 Brian Nichols
- S01E05 Jaime Osuna
- S01E06 Edward Johnson
- S01E07 James Robertson
- S01E08 Christa Pike
- S01E09 Tyler Davis Bingham
- S01E10 Fotios Geas

=== Series 2 ===
- S02E01 Craig Bjork
- S02E02 Ricky Dubose
- S02E03 Leo Boatman
- S02E04 Jessie Con-ui
- S02E05 Thomas Silverstein
- S02E06 Billy Tracy
- S02E07 Michael Dutcher
- S02E08 Denver Simmons
- S02E09 Casey Pigge
- S02E10 Mugsy Williams

=== Series 3 ===
- S03E01 Mikel Brady
- S03E02 Ramon Escobar
- S03E03 Rocky Beamon
- S03E04 Erica Jenkins and Nikko Jenkins
- S03E05 Joshua Gardner
- S03E06 Craig Wissink
- S03E07 Ezequiel Romo
- S03E08 Curtis Watson
- S02E09 Miti Maugaotega Jr.
- S03E10 Rodney Berget

== See also ==
- Most Evil
