= Michael Lupo =

Italian serial killer

- Born: Michele del Marco Lupo; 19 January 1953; Monte Donato, Bologna, Italy
- Died: 12 February 1995 (aged 42); Frankland Prison, Brasside, England
- Other name: Michael Lupo
- Convictions: 4 counts of murder 2 counts of attempted murder
- Penalty: 4 life sentences 14 years in prison

Details
- Victims: 4
- Country: England
- State: Brompton Road
- Date apprehended: 15 May 1986

Michele del Marco Lupo (19 January 1953 – 12 February 1995) was a serial killer originally from Italy, who was active in the UK. His most notable role was as branch manager at Yves Saint Laurent boutique in Brompton Road, London during the 1980s.

== History ==
=== James George Burns ===
On 16 March 1986, the body of 37-year-old James Burns was found strangled and partially clothed in the derelict basement of 32 Warwick Road, Kensington, London. Burns was a British rail train guard and worked at London's Liverpool Street station. The investigation made little progress because there was no obvious link between a perpetrator and the dead man. Although two witnesses came forward confirming James spent the day drinking and ended up meeting Lupo at The Coleherne Pub in Earls Court. Burns and Lupo were seen leaving together and getting into a taxi outside the pub.

=== Kevin McDonagh (Survived) ===
After appeals made by the police and celebrities like Kenny Everett regarding the murder of James Burns, 31-year-old Kevin McDonagh came forward to say he had been attacked the week prior in the same basement of Warwick Road. He too had met a man, later identified as Lupo, in the Coleherne Pub, Earls Court. They left together and made their way to the basement flat. Kevin recalled Lupo showed no emotion on the brief walk. Once inside Kevin was beaten until he passed out. He woke an hour later to find all his clothing intact. He stumbled out of the basement and bumped into two police constables. Looking back the constables said they assumed he was 'just another Irish drunk' but little did they know Kevin was the first known victim of Lupo, although he survived.

Kevin died in September 2000 at the Mildmay Mission Hospital from an AIDS-related illness.

=== Anthony Conolly ===
On 6 April 1986, the body of Anthony Conolly, 24, was found in a railway hut on the London Catford Loop by Ferndale Road, Brixton. He had been strangled with his own scarf. Conolly was sharing a flat with a man named Simon Walder who was HIV positive. Walder sharing his status with the pathologist upon formally identifying Conolly's body then saw a long delay between the discovery of the body and the post mortem. This was due to mortuary and pathology staff refusing to handle Conolly's body without first being tested for HIV/AIDS. The Metropolitan police felt there was no need but finally relented and the test came back negative.

Conolly had left his flat on the night of 5 April and took the short walk to the Prince of Wales pub on Coldharbour Lane, Brixton. He wore a sweater, with his trademark leather jacket embellished with silver studs, and severely distressed jeans with "shocking pink tights underneath". While also wearing his trademark scarf it was the tights that gained most attention throughout the evening, including the doorman who recalled Conolly left around 1 am. Nobody witnessed Lupo and Conolly meeting but they must have encountered each other shortly after Conolly left the Prince of Wales, Brixton.

Lupo confessed to strangling Conolly with the scarf he was wearing before leaving the body and taking a taxi to a nightclub where he danced until 3 am.

=== Unknown Male ===
A vagrant male, around 60 years old was found dead on Hungerford Bridge in the early hours of 18 April 1986. A post mortem showed the man had been strangled but despite various appeals and canvassing the man was never identified. It was understood he most likely lived in and around the Arches of Charing Cross known as cardboard city.

Upon Lupo's arrest, he informed police that he had killed the unknown man. Lupo told police he had left Heaven nightclub and crossing Hungerford Bridge the man asked Lupo for a cigarette. Lupo gave the man the one he was already smoking. In his statement to police Lupo said he could not explain why, but he had this urge to kill the man and thus strangled him with the tartan scarf the unknown man was wearing. Police documented the body had been dragged around 15 feet along the bridge.

=== Mark Leyland (Survived) ===
Less than 24 hours later, Lupo not only struck again but was in the very same area of Villiers Street, Charing Cross by Heaven nightclub. This time Lupo bumped into 22-year-old Mark Leyland who was exploring his sexuality and understood men cruised for sex around the area. Mark told Lupo his name was Marco before he followed Lupo down a side street near Hungerford Lane. Mark in his police statement shared he started to perform oral sex on Lupo when he just got the feeling something wasn't right and stopped. Lupo then started to punch Mark in the head repeatedly before fleeing through a window of the abandoned room.

Minutes later Lupo had returned with a large piece of wood and was prodding Mark with it through the window before he started to hit Mark on the head until he passed out. When Mark woke, he staggered onto Hungerford Lane, collapsed and was found by a constable on his beat. Mark reported the incident as a vicious mugging.

Mark came forward again when he saw and heard of Lupo's arrest. Mark gave evidence and Lupo was charged and convicted of attempted murder on Mark.

=== Damien Michael McCloskey ===
Damien McCloskey was originally from Derry, Northern Ireland and was 22 years old when in the early hours of 25 April 1986 he left Copacabana, Earls Court around 2 am. Making his way back to the Philbeach Hotel where he worked as a receptionist and occasionally bunked down for the night, he bumped into Lupo on Earls Court Road. Lupo later told police the pair walked back up Earls Court Road and entered the derelict basement of 150 Cromwell Road. As McCloskey fellated Lupo, he pulled a sheet off a nearby trolley and placing it around McCloskey's neck strangled him. McCloskey was not found until after Lupo's arrest and only on Lupo directing police to the body.

=== David Nigel Cole (Survived) ===
In the early hours of 8 May 1985, 30-year-old David Cole left his flat for cigarettes and a bite to eat. He walked over to the Market Tavern, Vauxhall and saw two men exit the pub and slip down the side of the building. One man left and Cole approached the man and he said they were mutually attracted. Cole then walked off with Lupo down Wyril Road to a lorry park. Cole told police in his statement that Lupo was unable to maintain an erection so Cole crouched down to fellate Lupo. He recalled he felt something around his neck and as it tightened he managed, after a struggle to get his hand under the fabric wrapped around his neck and eventually broke free. Cole shouted for help and Lupo fled. Cole stated the fabric around his neck was a silk sock which had been too short to successfully strangle Cole.

Cole first approached the Gay Switchboard and he claimed they told Cole not to report the incident to the police given the mistrust between the police and the gay community.

Cole did eventually inform the police and on the 15 May 1986 at 22:15, Cole was accompanied by two undercover detectives and a backup unit outside as they went from pub to pub. They started at the Prince of Wales, Brixton and moved on before returning. Upon the second visit to the Prince of Wales, Brixton, Cole informed detectives he had spotted the man who had tried to strangle him, Lupo.

Cole approached Lupo and after briefly speaking Lupo was then arrested and first taken to Croydon police station where Lupo denied the offer of a lawyer and confessed to the murders. Cole later shared he had a breakdown.

== Trial and imprisonment ==
On 15 May 1986, Michele del Marco Lupo was arrested and charged with the murders of Connolly and Burns along with the attempted murder of Cole. Lupo had been the branch manager at London's Yves Saint Laurent between 1980 and 1984. Detectives never did establish why Lupo left such a privileged role to take a lesser-paid role at Tan Guidicelli with a salary of £14,000 pa. Then 18-months later Lupo took a Sales Assistant role at Stravaganza on Oxford Street with a salary of £12,000 pa. At the time of his arrest, detectives established Lupo had been fired from Stravaganza only weeks earlier.

Lupo was originally from the village of Monte Donato, Bologna, Italy and had completed his national service in the Italian Bersaglieri, 22nd unit before coming to London in 1974.

The British tabloid press once or twice tried to dub Lupo "The Wolf Man" ("lupo" means "wolf" in Italian) but it never stuck or took off. He was occasionally referred to as the 'Silk Strangler' or 'Gay Executioner' but these never stuck nor took off. And while many gay men of the time recall the murders, Lupo and his crimes never really gained notoriety.

On 21 May, Lupo was charged with two other recent killings, those of hotel receptionist Damien McCloskey, who had been strangled in West London, and an unidentified man, who was murdered near Hungerford Bridge over the Thames. In addition to these four murders, Lupo was also charged with the attempted murder of Mark Leyland.

On 10 July 1987, at the Old Bailey, Lupo was sentenced to four life sentences, plus 14 years. Lupo had pleaded guilty to all charges.

Lupo had been remanded in Brixton Prison and then Frankland Prison after sentencing.

There were investigations in cities Lupo had visited in the early 1980s, such as New York City, Berlin and Los Angeles, to see if he was responsible for unsolved homicides in those locations, although no evidence of any further crimes committed by Lupo came to light.

=== AIDS and death ===
On 12 February 1995, Lupo died in Frankland Prison, County Durham from AIDS. An AIDS death is always due to an AIDS-related complication but his death certificate merely states "AIDS" with no post-mortem to establish the actual cause of death.

Detectives investigating believe Lupo's HIV diagnosis had led to a "callous rationale" and an "urge to kill" in an act of revenge. However, Lupo denied this given he stated he too only learned of his HIV diagnosis upon entering custody after his arrest whereby in 1986 compulsory AIDS testing was underway given the spread of AIDS in UK Prisons. Detectives also conceded that this theory was too neat and further, there was no record of Lupo having undertaken an HIV test prior to his arrest. Lupo maintained his motive for killing was his feeling of being abused by friends and society and not AIDS.

He spent the last years of his life in a prison hospital.

== See also ==
- List of serial killers in the United Kingdom
