= HM Prison Wakefield =

Prison in West Yorkshire, England

HMP Wakefield
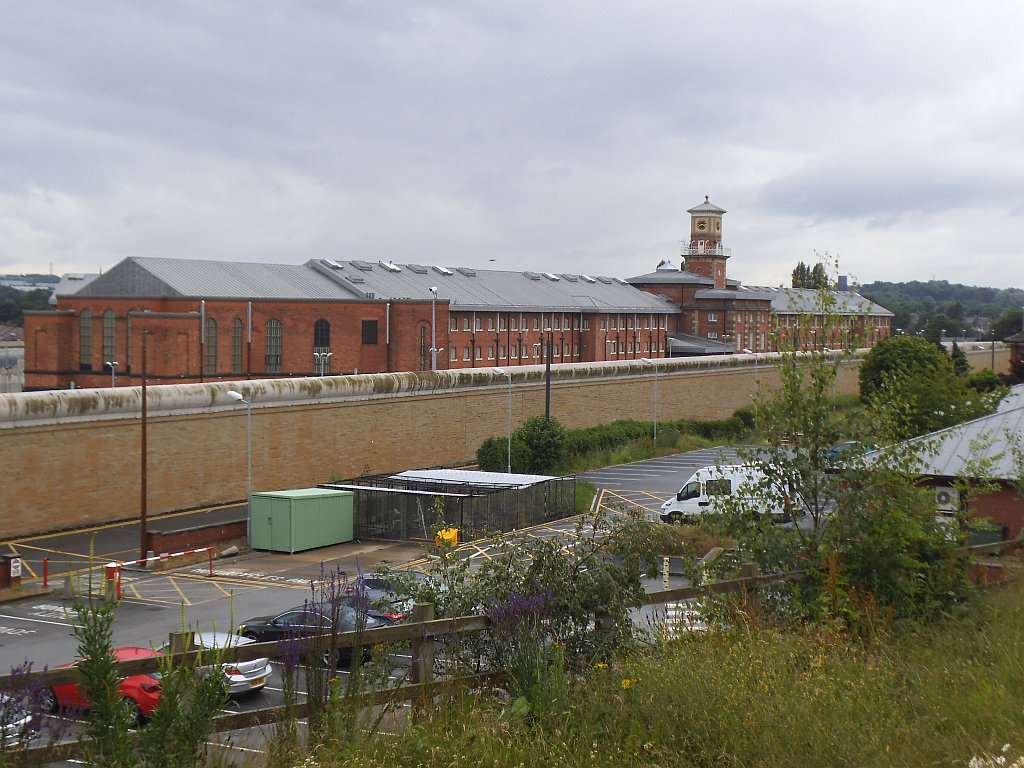
- Interactive map of HMP Wakefield
- Location: Wakefield, West Yorkshire, England; 53°40′57″N 1°30′33″W
- Security class: Adult Male/Category A
- Capacity: 750 (as at April 2025)
- Population: 630, including 148 category A (July 2025)
- Opened: 1594
- Managed by: HM Prison Services
- Governor: Michelle Metcalfe

His Majesty's Prison Wakefield is a Category A men's prison in Wakefield, West Yorkshire, England, operated by His Majesty's Prison Service. The prison has been nicknamed the "Monster Mansion" along with HM Prison Frankland due to the large number of high-profile, high-risk sex offenders and murderers held there.

== History ==
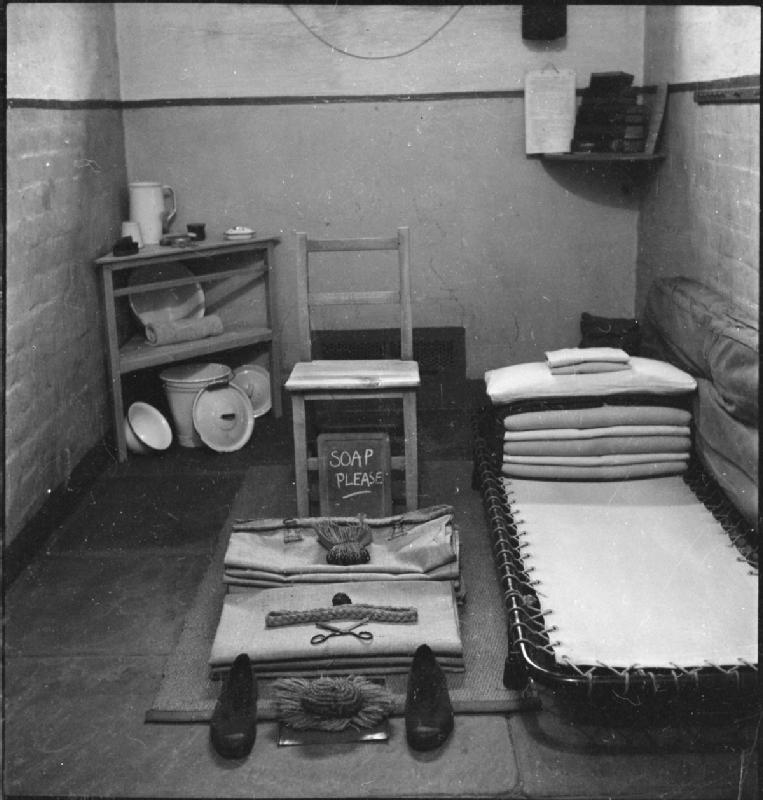
1944: "A view of an inmate's cell at Wakefield Prison. Clearly visible are the bed, a chair, several small shelves, and slop bucket. The rest of the inmate's belongings, such as a pair of shoes and a comb, have been set out neatly, ready for inspection. Chalked on a small blackboard are the words 'soap please'."

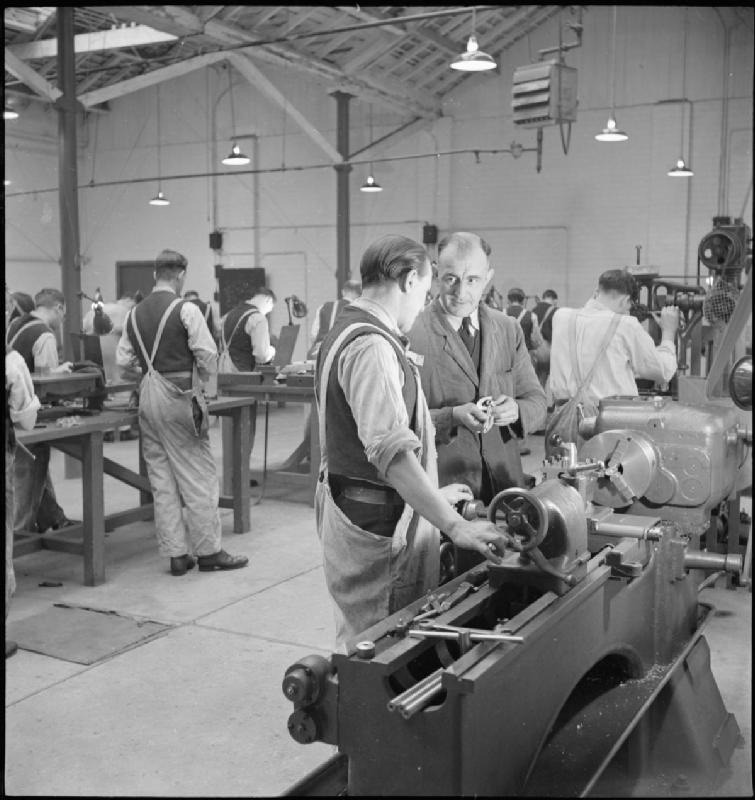
In the engineering works, inmates are trained in a new trade as part of their rehabilitation and preparation for their return to society, 1944

Wakefield Prison was originally built as a house of correction in 1594. Most of the current prison buildings date from the Victorian era. The current prison was designated a dispersal prison in 1967, holding 144 inmates and is the oldest of the dispersal prisons still operating across England and Wales.

The English Dialect Dictionary indicates references to Wakefield were often short for referring to the long-standing prison (e.g. "being sent to Wakefield" meant being sent to prison).

=== First World War ===
During the First World War, Wakefield Prison was used as a Home Office work camp. The ordinary criminal prisoners were removed, and the new influx were sentenced to two or more years' imprisonment for refusing to obey military orders. After the closure of Dyce Work Camp in October 1916, Wakefield Prison was also used to intern conscientious objectors. In September 1918, a group of conscientious objectors took advantage of a slackening in the prison regime that occurred towards the end of the war, by rebelling and refusing to undertake any work. They issued a list of demands for better treatment, known as the Wakefield Manifesto.

=== IRA prisoners ===
As a high-security prison, Wakefield was used to house IRA prisoners intermittently during the 20th century. In some cases in the 1950s, the IRA attempted to free the prisoners, such as Cathal Goulding in 1956 (the attempt was aborted when the sirens sounded) and James Andrew Mary Murphy in 1959 (who was freed). During a hunger strike by Provisional IRA prisoners, Frank Stagg died in Wakefield Prison on 12 February 1976. The case brought international media attention as the Irish Government denied Stagg's last request for a military funeral march from Dublin to Ballina, and instead arranged for the Irish police to bury him secretly. On 1 March 1976, Merlyn Rees, the Secretary of State for Northern Ireland in the Wilson ministry, announced that those people convicted of causing terrorist offences would no longer be entitled to Special Category Status, which was challenged during later hunger strikes.

=== 21st century ===
In 2001, it was announced that a new ultra-secure unit was to be built at Wakefield Prison. The unit was to house the most dangerous inmates within the British prison system, and was the first such unit of its kind to be built in the United Kingdom. It opened in April 2002.

In March 2004, an inspection report from Her Majesty's Chief Inspector of Prisons criticised staff at Wakefield Prison for being disrespectful to inmates. The report claimed that the prison was "over-controlled", and a third of the prison's inmates claimed to have been victimised.

On 11 October 2025, inmate Ian Watkins, the former lead singer and frontman of the rock band Lostprophets, died from a knife attack at the prison. Two fellow inmates were arrested and appeared in court on suspicion of murder. The attack happened the month after a report had found that violence in the prison had "increased markedly". According to the report there had been a 62% rise in violent incidents and a 72% increase in serious assaults since the last inspection in 2022, and older inmates felt unsafe around "a growing cohort of younger prisoners". On 5 November 2025, just under a month after Watkins death, Kyle Bevan, who was serving life with a 28 year minimum term for the murder of his partners two-year-old daughter, was found dead in his cell at the prison. Three fellow inmates, including Mark Fellows, were charged with murder over the incident.

== Facilities ==
As of April 2025, Wakefield Prison has the capacity to hold 750 prisoners. The report of a prison inspection in July 2025 said that there were 630 prisoners at that time, of whom 148 were classified as category A (the most high-risk). Accommodation at the prison comprises single-occupancy cells with integral sanitation. All residential units have kitchens available for offenders to prepare their own meals. An Incentives and Earned Privileges system allows standard and enhanced offenders the opportunity of in-cell TV. Like other HM Prisons, all offenders are subject to mandatory drugs testing and there are voluntary testing arrangements, which are compulsory for all offenders employed, for example as wing cleaners or kitchen workers.

HMP Wakefield offers a range of activities for inmates, including charity work, an accredited course in industrial cleaning, and a Braille shop where offenders convert books to Braille. The Education Department is operated by The Manchester College, and offers learning opportunities ranging from basic skills to Open University courses. Other facilities include a prison shop, gym, and multi-faith chaplaincy.

A prison inspection in 2018 found that Wakefield Prison was on the whole calm, secure, decent and well managed. Still, prisoners needing psychiatric care face unacceptable delays before they are transferred to secure psychiatric hospitals, and prisoners' mental condition worsens while they are waiting for transfer. Peter Clarke said, "Because of the totally unacceptable delays in doing so, many prisoners across the prison estate are held in conditions that are not in any way therapeutic and indeed in many cases clearly exacerbate their condition. (...) The situation at Wakefield was yet another example of prisoners with severe illness not receiving the care that they needed." Inspectors noted a prisoner who was "exceptionally challenging to manage and had complex needs that could not be met in the prison. While staff attempted to manage him positively and constructively, his condition was deteriorating during a lengthy wait to be admitted to a secure hospital," according to the inspection report.

== Notable inmates ==
=== Current ===
As of November 2025:

- Jeremy Bamber – Convicted of the murder of his adoptive mother, father, sister and his sister's two sons in the 1985 White House Farm murders.
- Kamel Bourgass – Islamic terrorist convicted of the murder of police officer Stephen Oake and the attempted murder of two other police officers.
- Mark Bridger – A paedophile who abducted and murdered 5-year-old April Jones in 2012.
- Sidney Cooke – Child molester and serial killer who raped and murdered Jason Swift and Barry Lewis.
- John Cooper – Welsh serial killer convicted of the "Pembrokeshire Murders" or the "Coastal Murders". Killed four people: a brother and sister and a married couple.
- Paul Doyle – Injured over 130 people after running over Liverpool F.C. parade during a road rage incident in May 2025.
- Mark Fellows – Hitman and double murderer. Also known as "The Iceman."
- Mark Hobson – Spree killer who murdered four people in July 2004. Hobson killed his girlfriend, her twin sister and an elderly couple.
- Thomas Hughes – The father of 6-year-old Arthur Labinjo-Hughes who was murdered by his stepmother, Emma Tustin in June 2020. He was sentenced to 24 years for manslaughter.
- David Minto - Hotel caretaker who murdered 16-year-old childcare student Sasha Marsden in January 2013.
- Jordan Monaghan – Serving life with a minimum of 48 years for murdering his 23-year-old girlfriend in 2019 along with his 21-month-old son and his newborn daughter in 2013.
- Mick Philpott – found guilty in April 2013 of causing the deaths of six of his children by arson.
- Jack Renshaw – Neo-Nazi and child sex offender who plotted to murder Labour MP Rosie Cooper.
- Reynhard Sinaga – Serial rapist who raped numerous men.
- Jamie Varley – Convicted of the murder of his 13-month-old adoptive son following a campaign of physical, sexual and psychological abuse.
- Roy Whiting – Child molester, kidnapper, and murderer of Sarah Payne in 2000

=== Former ===
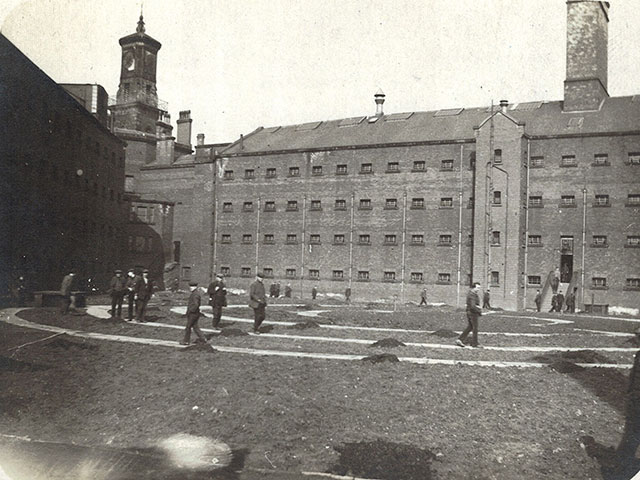
HM Prison Wakefield, 1916

- Damien Bendall – Sentenced to whole life order after admitting to murdering his pregnant partner, her two children (aged 13 and 11) and a school friend of one of the children (also aged 11). He also admitted to raping one of the children before she died. Moved to HMP Frankland.
- Robert Black – Convicted in 1994 of murdering three young girls during the 1980s, spent many years at HMP Wakefield before he was transferred to HMP Maghaberry in Northern Ireland, where he died in 2016.
- Charles Bronson, known in the British press as the "most violent prisoner in Britain" and "Britain's most notorious prisoner".
- Victor Farrant – Convicted of the murder of Glenda Hoskins in 1996 and the attempted murder of Anne Fiddler in 1995. Died of cancer while serving a life sentence on 3 May 2024.
- Klaus Fuchs – Spy convicted of supplying information from British and American nuclear weapon research to the USSR, served nine years and four months of his fourteen-year term at Wakefield, between 1951 and 1959.
- Fred Haslam (1897–1979) – a First World War conscientious objector
- Arthur Hiscoe – An architect who served seven days hard labour and was fined for drunkenness in 1906.
- Ian Huntley – convicted of the Soham double child murder and imprisoned at HMP Wakefield from 2004 to 2008, when he was moved to HMP Frankland.
- Colin Ireland – Serial killer dubbed "The Gay Slayer" who murdered five homosexual men in a three-month span in the early 1990s; died from Pulmonary fibrosis in 2012.
- Piran Ditta Khan – Ringleader of 2005 armed robbery in which police officer Sharon Beshenivsky was shot dead. Died in HMP Wakefield in February 2025.
- Stefan Ivan Kiszko, wrongly convicted of murder
- Radislav Krstić – Bosnian Serb war criminal
- Pavlo Lapshyn – a Ukrainian Neo-Nazi terrorist who committed crimes in 2013 against Muslims in the United Kingdom, including the murder of 82-year-old British Pakistani Mohammed Saleem. Died at HMP Wakefield on 23 September 2025, at the age of 37.
- Liam Lyburd – Convicted for planning to commit a shooting at Newcastle College.
- Robert Maudsley – Serial killer. Maudsley is Britain's longest serving prisoner in solitary confinement. Moved to HMP Whitemoor in 2025.
- Michael Sams – Convicted murderer and kidnapper. Killed teenager Julie Dart and kidnapped estate agent Stephanie Slater and held her for ransom.
- Harold Shipman – Widely considered the most prolific serial killer in modern history; Shipman hanged himself in his cell at Wakefield Prison on 13 January 2004, one day short of his 58th birthday. Shipman had been on round-the-clock suicide watch at two previous prisons, but such 'special measures' had not been deemed necessary after his transfer to Wakefield.
- Deividas Skebas – Stabbed nine-year-old girl to death on street in Boston, Lincolnshire. Moved to Rampton secure hospital after being deemed unfit to stand trial.
- Peter Sullivan – Wrongfully convicted of 1986 murder and served 38 years in prison before being exonerated.
- Ian Watkins – Lead singer and lyricist of the band Lostprophets, convicted of several sex offences, some involving children and infants. Watkins was killed by two fellow inmates on 11 October 2025.

== See also ==
- Listed buildings in Wakefield
