= Facebook Killer =

The Facebook Killer may refer to:

- Peter Chapman (murderer), English convicted murderer
- Steve William Stephens, American murderer
