= Murder of Sharon Beshenivsky =

Shooting of a British police officer

Sharon Beshenivsky
- Born: Sharon Jagger; 14 January 1967; Bradford, Yorkshire, England
- Died: 18 November 2005 (aged 38); Bradford, West Yorkshire, England
- Spouse: Paul Beshenivsky (m. 2000)
- Children: 3
- Police career
- Allegiance: United Kingdom
- Department: West Yorkshire Police
- Rank: Police Constable
- Badge no.: PC 6410

PC Sharon Beshenivsky (née Jagger; 14 January 1967 – 18 November 2005) was a West Yorkshire Police constable shot and killed by a criminal gang during a robbery in Bradford on 18 November 2005, becoming the seventh female police officer in Great Britain to be killed on duty. Her colleague, PC Teresa Milburn, was seriously injured in the same incident. Milburn had joined the force less than two years earlier; Beshenivsky had served only nine months as a constable in the force at the time of her death, having been a community support officer before.

Closed-circuit television cameras tracked a car rushing from the scene and used an automatic number plate recognition system to trace its owners. This led to six suspects being arrested; three were later convicted of murder, robbery, and firearms offences; two of manslaughter, robbery, and firearms offences; and one of robbery. Another suspect, Piran Ditta Khan, was arrested in Pakistan more than 14 years later and was extradited to the United Kingdom from Pakistan in April 2023. He was found guilty of murder, at Leeds Crown Court, in April 2024. The following month he received a life sentence, with a minimum term of 40 years.

== Background ==
Beshenivsky had been serving as a police officer for nine months. She had previously been a police community support officer with West Yorkshire Police. She was classed as a probationer under the supervision of an experienced colleague.

== Murder ==
On the afternoon of 18 November 2005, Beshenivsky and Milburn responded to reports that an attack alarm had been activated at a travel agent on Morley Street in Bradford. Upon arrival the officers encountered three men who had robbed the agent of £5,405; two were armed with a gun, another with a knife. One of the gunmen fired at them immediately at point-blank range, fatally wounding Beshenivsky in the chest and also hitting Milburn in the chest, before all three men made a getaway in a convoy of cars.

Beshenivsky was the seventh female officer to die in the line of duty in England and Wales and the second female officer to be fatally shot; the first was Yvonne Fletcher in London in 1984.

She had three children and two stepchildren. She died on her youngest daughter's fourth birthday. Beshenivsky's funeral took place on 6 January 2006 at Bradford Cathedral.

== Arrests ==
On 25 November 2005, police named Somali brothers Mustaf Jama, aged 25, and Yusuf Jama, aged 19, as well as 24-year-old Pakistani Muzzaker Imtiaz Shah as prime suspects. Yusuf Jama was arrested in Birmingham the following day and was subsequently charged with murder and robbery. On 12 December, Shah was arrested in Newport, South Wales; he was later also charged with murder. Mustaf Jama had fled to Somalia but was extradited two years later. The use of recently installed automatic number plate recognition technology in Bradford city centre played a vital role in identifying the suspects prior to their arrest.

More than 14 years after the crime, in January 2020, another suspect was arrested in Islamabad, Pakistan. Piran Dhitta Khan, age 71 at the time of his arrest, was reported to be wanted for masterminding the robbery. British police were granted his extradition in April 2023.

=== Convictions ===
On 18 December 2006, Yusuf Jama was found guilty of all charges against him, including the murder of Beshenivsky. He was sentenced to life imprisonment with a minimum term of 35 years. This was expected to keep Yusuf Jama imprisoned until at least 2040 and the age of 60.

Suspect	Convictions	Sentence
Mustaf Jama	Murder; robbery; firearms	Life with 35-year tariff
Yusuf Jama	Murder; robbery; firearms	Life with 35-year tariff
Muzzaker Shah	Murder; robbery; firearms	Life with 35-year tariff
Faisal Razzaq	Manslaughter; robbery; firearms	Life with 11-year tariff
Hassan Razzaq	Manslaughter; robbery; firearms	20 years
Raza Ul-Haq Aslam	Robbery	8 years

Shah was sentenced to life imprisonment with a minimum term of 35 years, which was also expected to keep him in prison until at least 2040 and the age of 60.

Faisal Razzaq, a 25-year-old from London, was cleared of murder but found guilty of manslaughter. He was sentenced to life imprisonment with a minimum term of 11 years before being considered for parole. This was expected to kept him imprisoned till 2017 and at the age of 36 he was released. He had driven the lead car of the gang's convoy from Leeds to Bradford and acted as a lookout during the robbery.

On 2 March 2007, Hassan Razzaq, the 26-year-old brother of Faisal, was also convicted of manslaughter and was sentenced to 20 years in prison. He had also acted as a lookout. Raza Ul-Haq Aslam was a 3rd lookout and was sentenced to eight years in prison for a single robbery offence.

All of the suspects except Aslam were also found guilty of robbery and a series of firearms offences.

On 1 November 2007, Mustaf Jama was extradited from Somalia, after a Home Office funded snatch operation that involved his Land Rover being ambushed by 15 local militiamen and then Jama being flown by private plane to the UK via Dubai, and taken into police custody at Bridewell police station in Leeds. He was charged the next day with the murder of Beshenivsky, appeared before Leeds magistrates, and was remanded into custody. On 22 July 2009 at Newcastle Crown Court, Mustaf Jama was found guilty of murder and was also told that he would serve at least 35 years in prison, which is expected to keep him in prison until 2044 and the age of 64. It later transpired that he had been released from prison, having been convicted of burglary and robbery offences, six months before Beshenivsky's murder and that he had been considered for deportation to his native Somalia.

=== Appeals ===
Yusuf Jama and Muzzaker Shah appealed for their sentences to be reduced. The High Court heard their appeals but agreed with the trial judge's recommended minimum term for both men and rejected the appeals. In 2010, Mustaf Jama made an application for permission to appeal his sentence. The Court of Appeal rejected his application in 2011.

Hewan Gordon was jailed for 18 months in 2007 for helping Shah evade capture. In 2010, he won an appeal against a government bid to deport him back to Somalia. His appeal was understood to have been made on human rights grounds.

=== Additional suspect ===
The alleged mastermind of the robbery, Piran Ditta Khan, fled to Pakistan. A reward of £20,000 was offered for information leading to his arrest.

In 2014, police renewed their appeal for information that might lead to Khan's arrest. Detective Superintendent Simon Atkinson said: "This investigation is not yet complete and will not be until everyone involved in any way in the murder of PC Beshenivsky is brought to justice. We have not, and will not leave any stone unturned in our search for justice. The £20,000 reward on offer remains and I would like to take this opportunity to appeal again to the people of Pakistan or to anyone who knows where this man is to get in contact."

Khan was arrested in Pakistan on 14 January 2020. He appeared in court in Islamabad the following day and was remanded in custody until 29 January.

In April 2023, Khan was extradited to the UK and taken to a West Yorkshire police station, where he was charged with murder, robbery, two counts of possessing a firearm with intent to endanger life and two counts of possessing a prohibited weapon. On 13 February 2024, he appeared at Leeds Crown Court listening to the proceedings with the help of an interpreter, as the prosecution case was outlined. Khan admitted to organising the robbery to regain £12,000 owed to him by the owner of the travel agent but denied the other charges, claiming that Hassan Razzaq had offered to "get the money back" and had not told him that guns would be used. However, prosecutors accused Khan of knowing that loaded weapons were used, and of acting as a lookout during the robbery. On 4 April 2024 he was found guilty of murder. On 10 May 2024, the court sentenced him to life, with a minimum term of 40 years.

== Subsequent events ==
In June 2007, Shah had nine years added to his sentence for firearms offences committed during a car chase in 2004. Faisal Razzaq had seven-and-a-half-years added to his sentence in June 2007 for possession of firearms in 2004.

In March 2008, both Shah and Yusuf Jama had a further four years added to their sentences for wounding with intent after they stabbed another inmate at Frankland prison in Brasside, County Durham.

On 18 August 2006, the rugby league club Bradford Bulls made a presentation on the pitch at their home stadium during the half-time interval of a match with Castleford Tigers, in Beshenivsky's honour. Her widower Paul, along with the Chief Constable of West Yorkshire Police Colin Cramphorn, were guests as Bradford Bulls chairman Peter Hood unveiled a memorial bench in her honour, which was to be placed in the club's reception area. On 8 May 2009, a memorial to Beshenivsky was unveiled at the location of her death. At the unveiling, Prime Minister Gordon Brown paid tribute to the officer's "dedication, professionalism and courage". Michael Winner, chairman of the Police Memorial Trust, also praised Beshenivsky and police officers across the country, saying: "Take them away and there's total anarchy and we are devoured by the forces of evil."

In November 2008, the British National Party was condemned for using the murder as an example of racially motivated crime in a piece of literature which was circulated to voters. Opponents of the party's policies were keen to point out that there was no obvious racial motive to the murder, and that the killers would obviously have killed anyone of any ethnic background who might have attempted to foil them.

In 2017, Faisal Razzaq was released from prison after serving eleven years of his sentence. He was later convicted of being part of a conspiracy to smuggle firearms to criminal gangs and received another life sentence.

On 21 February 2025, Piran Ditta Khan died less than a year into his life sentence at HM Prison Wakefield, from lung cancer aged 76.

== See also ==
- List of British police officers killed in the line of duty
