= Murder of Felecia Williams =

2014 murder and rape of a young girl in Florida

- Felecia Williams
- Location: Tampa, Florida, United States
- Date: May 16, 2014
- Attack type: Child murder and rape
- Deaths: Felecia Williams, 9
- Verdict: Guilty
- Convictions: First-degree murder Sexual battery Aggravated child abuse
- Sentence: Death (September 11, 2020)
- Convicted: Granville Ritchie

On May 16, 2014, at an apartment in Tampa, Florida, United States, nine-year-old Felecia Williams was raped and murdered by Granville Ashanti Ritchie (born December 5, 1978), who was left to take care of Williams by the girl's family friend. Williams's body was placed inside a suitcase and abandoned near a causeway, where it was found days later. Ritchie was found guilty of murdering Williams and sentenced to death in 2020.

== Murder ==
On May 16, 2014, a nine-year-old girl was raped and murdered inside an apartment near Tampa, Florida.

Before her death, the victim, Felecia Nicole Williams, was last seen going to the home of a family friend named Eboni Wiley, after Wiley and her boyfriend Granville Ashanti Ritchie fetched the girl from her house. After fetching Williams, the couple first stopped at a fast food restaurant to buy some food for Williams, before they headed to the apartment of Ritchie's mother, where Ritchie also stayed. Background information showed that Ritchie was originally from Jamaica, and he grew up in the Jamaican capital of Kingston before he immigrated to the United States and settled in Florida. Ritchie also had a extensive criminal history, including multiple cases of drug possession and sex with an underage girl, although these charges were either dropped or pending as of 2014.

After reaching Ritchie's apartment, Wiley left the place in order to buy marijuana, and even though she initially wanted to bring Williams out with her, Ritchie persuaded Wiley to leave the girl in his apartment, and therefore, Williams was left alone with Ritchie inside the apartment. Afterwards, Ritchie began to attack Williams, stripped off her clothing and raped her. Simultaneously, Ritchie also severely assaulted Williams and left her with traumatic blunt-force injuries, and manually strangled the girl to death. After murdering Williams, Ritchie hid the body and later informed Wiley that Williams was outdoors buying candy from a nearby store. When Wiley could not find Williams, the couple decided to concoct a story about how the girl went missing by running away from the apartment.

Later that evening, Ritchie dropped Wiley back to Tampa, where he dropped her off, and he returned to his apartment to prepare to dispose of Williams's body. Ritchie stuffed the girl's body inside a suitcase, which he loaded on his car before he drove across Hillsborough County and reached a water bay near a causeway in Clearwater, Florida. Ritchie took out the body from the suitcase and threw it inside the bay, before he left the site and went to stay with another girlfriend in St. Petersburg, Florida. On the way itself, Ritchie disposed of Williams's clothes and the suitcase. Meanwhile, Williams was reported missing, and Wiley gave the police the false account of Williams's disappearance, which she and Ritchie came up with.

On May 18, 2014, the naked body of Williams was discovered by boaters at the bay where Ritchie abandoned the body. She was identified after an autopsy was conducted on the victim, whose death was classified as a homicide. A week after the discovery of her body, a funeral was held for Williams, and several hundred people attended the memorial to mourn and commemorate the victim.

== Charges ==
After the discovery of Felecia Williams's body, Eboni Wiley was arrested in connection to the murder, and faced the charge of providing false information to the authorities regarding Williams's disappearance.

On May 21, 2014, five days after the murder of Williams, Granville Ritchie was arrested by the U.S. Marshalls in St. Petersburg, Florida on an unrelated charge of drug possession. Subsequently, Ritchie was named as a suspect behind the murder of Williams, although he was not charged for killing Williams at this point. Ritchie additionally faced four counts of unlawful sexual activity with a minor and one count of marijuana possession. A month later, three of these sexual assault charges were dropped by the prosecution.

On August 15, 2014, three months after his arrest, Ritchie was formally charged with first-degree murder, sexual battery and aggravated child abuse for the murder of Williams.

On February 27, 2015, the Hillsborough State Attorney's Office announced they would seek the death penalty for Ritchie. Under Florida state law, the offence of first-degree murder carries a potential sentence of either life imprisonment without the possibility of parole or the death penalty. Ritchie's trial date was initially set for July 2019, but the tentative trial date was eventually pushed back to September 2019.

Eboni Wiley was separately charged with providing false information to law enforcement in a missing person investigation involving a child. She later reached a plea agreement with the prosecution in October 2020, and was sentenced two months later to 75 days' imprisonment and five years of probation.

== Trial of Granville Ritchie ==
On August 30, 2019, Granville Ritchie stood trial for the murder of Felecia Williams. Jury selection began in September, and a 12-member jury was assembled on September 12, 2019, to hear the case.

On September 13, 2019, the jury trial of Ritchie officially began at the Hillsborough County Circuit Court.

On September 25, 2019, the jury found Ritchie guilty of first-degree murder, sexual battery and aggravated child abuse.

During the sentencing hearing, Hillsborough State Attorney Andrew H. Warren sought the death penalty, describing the murder of Williams as "heinous, atrocious, and cruel" and it was classified as one of the worst of the worst cases that warranted the imposition of capital punishment. Williams's mother came to court to testify about the impact of her daughter's death on herself and their family. The defence, on the other hand, argued for Ritchie to receive life without parole and his family from Jamaica were set to testify through video link for mercy. Dr. Joseph Wu, a neuropsychiatrist, testified that Ritchie had traumatic brain injuries caused by accidents and childhood abuse, and it led to cumulative neurological damage on Ritchie's psychiatric state.

On September 27, 2019, the jury unanimously agreed to impose the death penalty for Ritchie.

On September 11, 2020, Judge Michelle Sisco formally sentenced Ritchie to death for the murder of Felecia Williams. During sentencing, Judge Sisco remarked that Williams died of a "horrendous, physically painful, psychologically torturous death" and addressed Williams's mother commending her bravery and advocacy for her daughter. Williams's mother stated that she stood in court to testify as a "wounded mother" and she wanted Ritchie to be executed for murdering her daughter, while Williams's father stated he had forgiven Ritchie for what he did.

== Appeal and death row ==
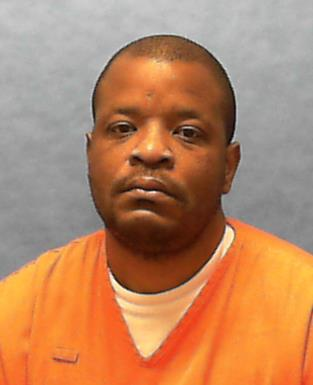
Mugshot of Granville Ritchie

After he was sentenced to death, Granville Ritchie filed an appeal against the death sentence to the Florida Supreme Court in November 2021.

On June 9, 2022, Ritchie's death sentence was upheld by the Florida Supreme Court after it dismissed his appeal.

In August 2023, Ritchie filed another appeal to Judge Michelle Sisco to review his death sentence.

On March 6, 2025, Ritchie filed a petition for a new trial.

As of 2026, Ritchie remains on death row at the Union Correctional Institution.

== Aftermath ==
The murder of Felecia Williams was re-enacted and featured in true crime documentary World's Most Evil Killers in 2026.

== See also ==
- Capital punishment in Florida
- List of death row inmates in the United States § Florida
- List of murdered American children
