= Donald Gene Miller =

American serial killer

- Born: December 28, 1954 (age 71); Lansing, Michigan, U.S.
- Other names: "The East Lansing Serial Killer"; Don Miller
- Convictions: Manslaughter (4 counts); Rape; Attempted murder (2 counts)
- Penalty: 30-to-50 years imprisonment (Gilbert case); 10-to-15 years imprisonment (murders); 20-to-40 years imprisonment (1998)

Details
- Victims: 4
- Span of crimes: 1977–1978
- Country: United States
- State: Michigan
- Date apprehended: August 16, 1978
- Imprisoned at: Central Michigan Correctional Facility, St. Louis, Michigan

Donald Gene Miller (born December 28, 1954), known as The East Lansing Serial Killer or simply Don Miller, is an American serial killer and rapist who committed a series of six attacks in East Lansing, Michigan from 1977 to 1978. Four of these resulted in fatalities, to which Miller would later plead guilty and received a lengthy prison sentence with a chance of parole.

== Biography ==
Donald Gene Miller was born on December 28, 1954, in Lansing, Michigan, one of three children of Gene and Elaine Miller. His parents, who lived in a middle-class neighborhood of East Lansing, were considered upstanding, religious, and law-abiding citizens who took good care of their son.

Throughout the early 1970s, he attended East Lansing High School, where he was regarded as a good student who played the trombone in the school's marching band, was a youth minister at his church and was considered popular. During this period, he met a girl named Martha Sue Young, who would become his girlfriend. After graduating from high school in 1973, Miller enrolled at the Michigan State University, where he studied criminal law. He continued his intimate relationship with Young and, in his spare time, worked part-time as a construction worker.

== Murders ==
In late 1976, Miller proposed to Young, which she accepted. However, in December, she broke off their relationship and refused to marry him. Three days later, she met with Miller on New Year's Eve, 1977. During the early hours of the morning, he assaulted and strangled her.

After Young did not return home, her parents contacted the police, who began an investigation. They eventually located witnesses who claimed that Miller was the last person to see her alive, whereupon he was detained for interrogation. During the procedure, Miller admitted that he had indeed spent the night with her, but insisted that he drove her to her doorstep at around 2 AM before he headed back home. Since Young's body had not been found at the time and there was no evidence to implicate him in a crime, the authorities released him. On October 20, 1977, two hunters found Young's clothes and purse near a lake in Bath. Young's underwear was found neatly tucked inside her outer clothing, leading police to believe that her killer had posed the clothing after the murder.

On June 15, 1978, Miller attacked 27-year-old Marita Choquette, an assistant editor at WKAR-TV, whom he stabbed 17 times. Miller cut Choquette's hands off, later telling investigators this was because he could not remove the handcuffs he had restrained her with. Her body was taken to a property in Alaiedon Township and covered with cinderblocks.

On June 27, he killed his third victim, 21-year-old MSU student Wendy Bush. While investigating her disappearance, authorities found witnesses who claimed that they had last seen her on campus with a young, tall white man who was unknown to them.

His fourth victim was 30-year-old school teacher Kristine Guske Stuart, whom he met on the street during a walk home from the campus' auto shop on August 14. During the attack, Miller strangled Stuart, then loaded her corpse into his car and drove outside of town, where he dumped it.

== Final attack and arrest ==
On August 16, 1978, two days after Stuart's murder, Miller knocked on the door of a random house in Lansing, asking to use the phone. The door was answered by 14-year-old Lisa Gilbert, and upon realizing that she was home alone, he decided to attack her. After asking the girl for a pencil and paper to write down the number, he was allowed inside, whereupon he tied up, beat, raped and assaulted her. In order to get rid of any witnesses, Miller attempted to kill Lisa's 13-year-old brother, Randy, who had just returned home from a walk. However, Randy instead confronted the assailant, allowing his sister to flee outside. Since she was only wearing nylon stockings tied around her wrists and her father's necktie, which Miller had used as a gag, Gilbert immediately attracted the attention of passers-by and motorists. In the meantime, Miller had managed to choke Randy into unconsciousness and had stabbed him three times, but despite his extensive injuries and blood loss, he survived the ordeal.

Following the attack, Miller attempted to drive away in his brown 1973 Oldsmobile Cutlass, but numerous witnesses managed to remember his license plates and appearance. After providing this information to police, it subsequently led to his arrest at his own apartment mere hours later, with Miller being charged with the attempted murders.

=== Trial and investigation ===
After his arrest, Miller was charged with the rape of Lisa Gilbert, as well as the attempted murder of both her and her brother. A plethora of evidence linked him to the crime, including semen samples and fingerprints left on household objects and on the victims' bodies, but despite this, he refused to plead guilty. Miller claimed that he suffered from multiple personality disorder, and due to this, his attorneys filed a motion to have him undergo a psychiatric evaluation. The results of the examination concluded that he was sane, had a relatively high IQ and even attempted to manipulate the psychiatrists during the procedures.

The trial began in the spring of 1979 and lasted two weeks. A number of prosecution witnesses, including the victims, confidently identified Miller as the assailant when put on the stand. Based on various pieces of evidence and testimony, he was found guilty on all charges on May 8, 1979, and sentenced to 50 years imprisonment with a chance of parole after serving 30 years.

At the time of sentencing, Miller was still considered the prime suspect in his ex-fiancée's murder, and as he was the last person to see her alive, he was eventually charged with her murder. Although the prosecution's case consisted of witness testimonies and highly circumstantial evidence, the likelihood of conviction was high and, if convicted, he would receive an additional sentence. On July 13, with the assistance of his attorneys, Miller approached the Ingham County Prosecutor's Office with a plea deal: in exchange for dropping the first-degree murder charges and waiving the option of life imprisonment, he would plead guilty to four murders and reveal the locations to the three remaining victims to police.

His offer was accepted, and three days later, Miller was transported under escort to Bath, where he revealed that Young's body had been dumped in Priggooris Park. Afterwards, he was transported to Olive Township, Clinton County, where he indicated that he had dumped Stuart's remains in a drainage ditch. A few days later, Miller led the police to the remains of the last victim, Wendy Bush, which were found in a small patch of woods at the intersection of two roads near Delta Charter Township.

=== Confessions ===
In subsequent interviews, Miller told investigators how events unfolded during each of the murders. He claimed that he strangled Young in the early hours of January 1, 1977, in a fit of rage after she told him that she was no longer interested in him. He was also acquainted with Bush and had asked her out on several occasions, but when she repeatedly refused, he strangled her in a parking lot near Spartan Stadium.

He also claimed to be on friendly terms with Choquette, whom he had met while at MSU - Miller stated that on the day of the murder, he had invited her over for breakfast and killed her immediately afterwards. He explained that he had tied her up and handcuffed her wrists, which he was later unable to open, forcing him to cut off her hands instead. In describing details of Stuart's murder, Miller surprised law enforcement by claiming that he had not planned to kill her. According to his testimony, Stuart resembled Young, which made him believe that she was still alive - in an apparent panic, he ran her over with his car. Upon examining the unconscious woman up close, Miller realized that she was not Young and attempted to help her up. However, as she was unconscious and bleeding profusely, he ultimately strangled her and loaded the corpse into his car, whereupon he drove to Clinton County and left it in a drainage ditch.

=== Convictions ===
Based on the terms of the plea deal, the first-degree murder charges were dismissed. Miller was instead charged with several counts of involuntary manslaughter, to which he pleaded guilty and was sentenced to 15 years imprisonment with a chance of parole after 10 years. The relatively lenient sentence and the plea deal itself caused outrage in the state and across the country, with victims' relatives criticizing prosecutors for accepting it. However, the Ingham County Prosecutor, Peter Houk, later said in a statement that he had no other choice since the bodies of the victims had not yet been discovered and with predominantly circumstantial evidence, the chance of a successful conviction was slim.

== Aftermath and current status ==
In the aftermath of his incarceration, Miller was interned at various facilities around the state, where he was always described as a model inmate who worked for the prison's newspaper. After serving 10 years in prison, Miller was allowed to apply for parole in 1989, but this was denied because of protests from his victims' families and due to the seriousness of his crimes. From then until 1997, he applied for parole six more times, but was always denied. In 1997, an organization named the Public Awareness and Protection Committee, spearheaded by Martha Young's mother, Sue, was created in order to uncover all the wrongdoings Miller had committed while imprisoned. Their first discovery was that three years prior, during a search of Miller's cell at the Kinross Correctional Facility, jailguards discovered and confiscated a shoelace that could have been used as a murder weapon.

Upon discovering this, Sue Young contacted representatives of the Chippewa County Prosecutor's Office who, after reviewing the investigation, filed charges against Miller for illegal possession of weaponry. Miller's attorneys, who had been hired by his parents, tried to convince the jury that there was no evidence that the shoelace could be used as a weapon, but Miller was nonetheless found guilty and sentenced to an additional 40 years imprisonment with a chance of parole after serving 20 years. Due to this, he would only be allowed to file another parole application in October 2018.

In the early 2010s, after many prison facilities across the USA began experiencing problems with prison overcrowding, a series of judicial reforms were enacted to reduce the number of prisoners. In 2015, the Supreme Court ruled that all prisoners eligible for parole could apply out of state when they have served 25 years and reached the age of 60. Because Miller fell into this category of prisoners, he filed an unscheduled parole application in 2016. In response, his victims' relatives and many members of the Ingham County Prosecutor's Office created a petition protesting his release and presented it to the Department of Corrections. After reviewing his case, the Parole Board denied Miller's application and barred him filing any further claims until August 2021. Chris Gautz, a spokesman for the Department of Corrections, said in a statement that the parole was denied due to the fact Miller denied his guilt during the 1998 trial on the weapons charges. He also said that Miller had not participated in any sex offender rehabilitation programs over the years and had failed to convince the board members that he no longer posed a danger to society.

In June 2021, Miller applied for parole for the ninth time, but was again denied and barred from applying until summer 2022. In early May 2022, Miller again applied for parole, but due to protests from victims' relatives and the severity of his actions, he was denied. The next time he will be able to file another application is August 2027. If Miller serves out his sentence in full, his projected release date is on March 24, 2031.

== In the media and culture ==
In 2020, a retired sheriff's sergeant from Eaton County, Rod Sadler, released a book detailing Miller's crimes, titled "Killing Women". In it, Sadler explores the crimes in detail, in addition to including letters written from prison by Miller himself.

In 2021 his case was covered by British television show Most Evil Killers.

In 2022 Lisa and Randy Gilbert told their stories in A&E television show I Survived A Serial Killer.

== See also ==
- List of serial killers in the United States

== Bibliography ==
- Sadler, Rod (September 18, 2020). KILLING WOMEN: The True Story of Serial Killer Don Miller's Reign of Terror. WildBlue Press. ISBN 978-1952225277.
