= Linda Dobbs =

Sierra Leonean–English judge (born 1951)

Dame Linda Dobbs DBE
- Royal coat of arms of the United Kingdom

Justice of the High Court
- In office 1 October 2004 – 13 June 2013
- Monarch: Elizabeth II
- Succeeded by: Sir Clive Lewis

Judicial Commissioner
- Incumbent
- Assumed office 18 October 2017

Independent Assessor of Compensation for Miscarriages of Justice
- In office 8 April 2016 – May 2024
- Preceded by: Dame Janet Smith
- Succeeded by: Sir Robin Spencer

Personal details
- Born: Linda Penelope Dobbs; 3 January 1951 (age 75) Freetown, Sierra Leone
- Education: University of Surrey; London School of Economics

Dame Linda Penelope Dobbs, DBE (born 3 January 1951) is a retired High Court judge in England and Wales, who served from 2004 to 2013. Dobbs was the first non-white person to be appointed to the senior judiciary of England and Wales.

== Biography ==
Linda Penelope Dobbs was born in Freetown, Sierra Leone, to Arthur Ernest Dobbs, and his wife, Loyda Dobbs (née Johnson). Loyda Johnson was a Creole from Sierra Leone and Arthur Dobbs was an English lawyer originally from Warwickshire, who went on to serve as a High Court judge in Sierra Leone.

== Education ==
Dobbs was educated at Moreton Hall School, a boarding independent school for girls, near the market town of Oswestry in Shropshire, followed initially by the University of Edinburgh, where she read music but left after a year.

She then attended the University of Surrey, where she studied Russian and law, graduating in 1976. She went on to the London School of Economics, where she obtained a master's degree, followed by a doctorate in Soviet criminology and penology.

== Life and career ==
Dobbs was called to the Bar in 1981, practising from 5 King's Bench Walk, the chambers of the then Attorney general Sir Michael Havers, QC. She had a mixed criminal practice, in later years specialising in fraud and professional disciplinary tribunals, including the General Medical Council and the General Dental Council. She took silk in 1998.

She was a member of the General Council of the Bar and chaired its Professional Standards Committee and Race Relations Committee. In 2003, she became the chairman of the Criminal Bar Association. She was appointed as a deputy High Court judge in February 2003, without having previously held appointment as a recorder. She was appointed as a judge of the High Court in 2004, assigned to the Queen's Bench Division without having sat as a deputy High Court judge. Of her appointment to the High Court, she said: "Whilst this appointment might be seen as casting me into the role of standard bearer, I am simply a practitioner following a career path. I am confident, nevertheless, that I am the first of many to come."

Dobbs appeared in the 2008 "Black Britannia" exhibition in London by Daily Mirror photographer John Ferguson, and was also included in published lists of Britain's 10 most powerful black women and 100 Great Black Britons.

She is a patron of the African Prisons Project and an initiator of the 18 Red Lion Court Award for African advocates. She is also patron of Masicorp, an NGO promoting education in Masiphumelele, South Africa.

On 20 April 2013, Dobbs took early retirement from the High Court, aged 62 years. She was later appointed as chair of an independent inquiry into Lloyds Banking Group's handling of the HBOS Reading branch fraud.
