= Joshua Wade =

American serial killer (1980–2024)

- Born: Joshua Alan Wade; March 18, 1980; Great Falls, Montana, U.S.
- Died: June 14, 2024 (aged 44); Indiana State Prison, Michigan City, Indiana, U.S.
- Convictions: Federal; Carjacking resulting in death (18 U.S.C. § 2119); Alaska; First degree murder
- Penalty: Federal; Life imprisonment Alaska; 99 years imprisonment

Details
- Victims: 5
- Span of crimes: 1994–2007
- Country: United States
- State: Alaska
- Date apprehended: September 2, 2007

Joshua Alan Wade (March 18, 1980 – June 14, 2024) was an American serial killer who was convicted of two separate murders committed in Alaska in 2000 and 2007 respectively, and sentenced to 99 years imprisonment. Wade pled guilty to one of the murders in federal court to avoid execution. Seven years later, as part of a plea deal, he confessed to three additional murders dating back to 1994, including one for which he had previously been acquitted, in exchange for a transfer to a federal prison.

== Early life ==
Joshua Alan Wade was born on March 18, 1980, in Great Falls, Montana, but moved to Anchorage at a young age to live with his father, while his mother resorted to placing him in an acquaintance's care so she could work. Unknown to her, that same acquaintance started sexually abusing Joshua when he was five. After suffering a failed romance as a teenager, he began to develop anger issues and soon after started getting in trouble with law enforcement. According to his father, sister and several friends, Wade openly expressed his hatred of women, particularly towards Alaska Natives.

== Murders ==
Wade's first confessed murder was that of 38-year-old John Michael Martin, an unemployed schizophrenic who was found shot to death along a bike trail in Anchorage in May 1994. Shortly before his death, Martin had left a Village Inn he regularly visited to have coffee with friends. At the time of the murder, Wade was 14 years old and had no known connection to his victim. Five years later, in December 1999, he claimed to have killed 30-year-old Henry Ongtowasruk at a motel in Knik-Fairview. His victim suffered from a mental illness and had lived at the motel for approximately a week before he was found by an employee, shot to death in one of the rooms. Like Martin before him, Ongtowasruk had no known prior connection to Wade.

One night in September 2000, Wade and a few friends were driving around Spenard when he spotted 33-year-old Della Brown, an Alaska Native woman with a drug and alcohol addiction. After dropping off his friends, he returned to the place where he had spotted Brown and attempted to rob her. A struggle ensued, with Wade overpowering her and smashing her head with a rock. He then left her half-naked body in an abandoned, trash-filled shed, later showing the body to acquaintances. Supposedly, he killed an unidentified man who had accompanied him to the shed where he killed Brown – according to Wade, he knocked the victim out, put him in the trunk of his car and went for some drinks. Upon returning to the car and hearing the banging on the trunk for help, he drove outside of town to a secluded area in the Matanuska-Susitna Valley, got him out of the car, repeatedly stomped on his head, took off his clothes and ultimately shot him twice in the head execution-style.

=== Prosecution and acquittal for Brown's murder ===
Eventually, one of the acquaintances who saw Brown's body reported the incident to police, which subsequently resulted in Wade's arrest. Physical evidence tying him to the crime was scarce, and at trial, his attorneys presented him simply as a "big talker" who would go to unbelievable amounts of exaggeration to impress his friends. As they were themselves criminals, the claims of Wade's acquaintances were easily dismissed, leaving little chance of conviction. As a result, he was acquitted from almost all charges presented against him, with the exception of evidence tampering, for which he was given a prison sentence of six and a half years. However, he was released on probation the following year. He was always known to law enforcement and suspected of being responsible but no evidence at the time was available.

=== Murder of Mindy Schloss and arrest ===
In 2007, Wade moved into a new home in Anchorage, where he became the next-door neighbor of 52-year-old Mindy Schloss, a nurse practitioner who worked in Fairbanks. On August 3, he got angry after an apparent rough day at work and decided to rob Schloss, who was at home at the time. After creeping inside her house, Wade restrained her with zip ties and forced her to give up her ATM card and PIN before stuffing her in the back seat of her red Acura Integra. He then drove north towards an isolated area near Wasilla and, at gunpoint, forced Schloss into the woods, where he subsequently shot her in the back of the head with a Glock. After making sure she was dead, he burned her body and subsequently left the area.

Soon after, a friend of Schloss reported her missing after she failed to show up at work or return her calls. An inspection of her home revealed that her car had been stolen, and after a month of searching, her partially burned body was located on September 13. Now designated as a murder, authorities checked her financial activity and noticed that somebody had been making withdrawals using her ATM card – upon checking the surveillance footage, it was revealed to be an unidentified white male. Coincidentally, a similar-looking man was seen abandoning Schloss' car at an airport in Anchorage.

After ruling out Schloss' partner as a suspect, authorities began investigating the neighbors, taking particular interest in Wade due to his criminal convictions and his infamous murder trial. When questioned, two of his past girlfriends confirmed that he was indeed the man on the surveillance footage, but by the time they went to his home, he had already fled. His whereabouts remained unknown until September 2, when a friend of his reported that he was skulking outside her house. Police arrived at the scene, but by then, Wade had already gone to a nearby acquaintance's house, where he held hostages at gunpoint. After several rounds of negotiating with a lawyer, he was successfully convinced to surrender.

== Trial, sentence and confessions ==
Following his arrest, Wade was brought to the police station, where he categorically refused to speak with investigators, who attempted to trick him into confessing by claiming that they had already talked with Schloss, but failed. While authorities feared that they would be unable to convict him due to the lack of a body, this all changed when Schloss' corpse was eventually located, followed in quick succession by a positive DNA match for Wade, found in her car. Further incriminating evidence was located after it was confirmed that he wore the same coat as the man on the surveillance footage; that he had a receipt with Schloss' PIN on it; and a picture on his phone showing the same Glock used in the killing.

Wade was charged with Schloss' murder in state court, and faced additional federal charges of carjacking, theft and bank fraud. While the state of Alaska has no death penalty, the inclusion of the carjacking charge made him eligible for the federal death penalty. In a bid to avoid this outcome, Wade accepted a plea bargain proposed by the prosecutors; he would be sentenced to 99 years in state prison and to a federal life term in exchange for admitting guilt in the murder. In addition to this, he willingly confessed to killing Brown as well, saying in a speech that he was sorry for what he had done and deserved a much harsher punishment.

After the trial, Wade was transferred to serve his sentence at the Spring Creek Correctional Center in Seward. He initially attempted to amend his plea deal, but after that proved unsuccessful, he contacted state and federal authorities in 2014 claiming that he had a proposal for them. Once interviewed, Wade admitted to three further murders, demanding that he be transferred to serve his sentence in the federal prison system in exchange. This request was granted, and he was soon transferred to USP Terre Haute. He was later moved to Indiana State Prison, where he was incarcerated at the time of his death. Since his admission to the three additional killings, the FBI and state police have been attempting to uncover the identity of his unknown murder victim, as well as possibly linking him to any further violent crimes.

== Death ==
On June 14, 2024, Wade was found unresponsive in his cell at the Indiana State Prison and later pronounced dead. An investigation into his death is currently ongoing.

== In the media and culture ==
Wade's crimes have been discussed on several true crime–oriented television shows including Murder She Solved, Cold Blooded Alaska: Winter Kill, Fatal Frontier: Evil in Alaska, and Most Evil Killers.

== See also ==
- List of serial killers in the United States

== Bibliography ==
- Monte Francis (May 11, 2016). Ice and Bone: Tracking an Alaskan Serial Killer. WildBlue Press. ASIN B01FGEBTYK.
- Crystal Downs (May 11, 2017). Serial Killer Joshua Wade. ASIN B071L66MGW.
