= Andrzej Kunowski =

Polish murderer, serial rapist and suspected serial killer

- Born: 29 March 1956; Warsaw, Poland
- Died: 23 September 2009 (aged 53); HM Prison Frankland, Brasside, England
- Other name: "The Beast of Mława"
- Convictions: Murder x1 Rape x27
- Penalty: Life imprisonment

Details
- Victims: 1–4
- Span of crimes: 1992–2000
- Country: Poland, England
- States: Masovia, Greater London
- Date apprehended: 2002

Andrzej Kunowski (29 March 1956 – 23 September 2009), known as the Beast of Mława (Polish: Bestia z Mławy), was a Polish murderer, serial rapist and suspected serial killer. A prolific sex offender in his native country, Kunowski later moved illegally to England, where he murdered 12-year-old Macedonian girl Katerina Koneva in 1997. Sentenced to a whole life order for this crime, he was detained at the HM Prison Frankland until his death in 2009. He remains the prime suspect in the disappearances of three girls between 1992 and 2000, for which he was never charged.

== Early life ==
Andrzej Kunowski was born on 29 March 1956, in Warsaw, Poland. His father was a respected builder who worked on several construction sites, while his mother was a homemaker. When he was still young, the family moved to Mława after his father was offered an apartment in the city center by the PBRol company, which wanted to hire him. While his parents were regarded as decent, likeable people, Andrzej was considered a nervous, troublesome child who constantly had problems at school and had difficulty conversing with his peers. As a teenager, he stole some money from his parents' savings book and fled from home, wandering around the country.

== Crimes in Poland ==
Kunowski's first arrest for rape was in 1973, when he was barely 17 years old. At the time, believing the teenager was unlikely to relapse, the court sentenced him to only three years. However, not long after his release, Kunowski was brought to trial again, this time for theft. He was given a suspended sentence.

Kunowski, who was working as an ambulance driver, began raping young girls and women in towns around Warsaw. According to several contemporary Polish newspapers, Kunowski would often spot women picking strawberries by the road while driving, whereupon he would stop the ambulance, run into the field, drag his victims to the nearby bushes, and then rape them. In one instance, it was alleged that Kunowski lured a victim by asking for directions, but then ignored her response and asked her to lean into the car. He then closed the window on her neck, raping her while she was immobilized.

At the time of his arrest and trial in Ciechanów in 1980, Kunowski was charged with attempted murder, 25 counts of rape, robberies, and escape from custody. The prosecutor, Waldemar Smardzewski, requested that the defendant be given the maximum penalty of 25 years imprisonment, expressing his concern that Kunowski's crimes would progressively worsen if he were released. Despite his request, Kunowski was sentenced to 15 years and later paroled in 1991 for good behaviour.

During this time, he was a suspect in the disappearance of 14-year-old student Agnieszka Grzybicka, who mysteriously vanished after finishing her lessons at one of the primary schools in Mława. Despite a joint effort by local resident and the police to locate her, Grzybicka was never found, leading some to believe that she had been abducted and killed. As part of the inquiry, both Kunowski and Leszek Pękalski were questioned, but neither was charged in the case. Kunowski was arrested again in 1995 on charges of raping two girls. After remaining in custody for two years, he complained of an obstructed artery, which was confirmed during a medical examination. As a result, the courts issued that he temporarily released for treatment. However, Kunowski, who had sold his flat in Mława the previous year, used the money to buy himself a fake passport and flee to England.

== Murder of Katerina Koneva ==
Using his fake passport, Kunowski found himself a job as a dry cleaner in Acton, London. Only a few months after his arrival, he began stalking girls in the area, but never completed any rapes. On 22 May 1997, he found a new target: 12-year-old Macedonian immigrant Katerina Koneva, who lived with her parents in Hammersmith. After following Koneva home from school, Kunowski broke in and jammed the door with a chair in order to prevent anyone from entering. He choked the young girl with a cord, but was interrupted by the girl's father, Trajce Konev, who saw him through a crack in the door.

Kunowski jumped out of a window and ran away while being chased down by Konev. Kunowski threatened to stab him with a knife, carjacked a nearby woman and fled. Konev attempted to save his daughter, successfully cutting the cord wrapped around her neck, but despite the efforts of Konev, police and paramedics, she could not be revived. Shortly after the murder, Scotland Yard announced a 20,000 pound reward for any information that may lead to the capture of Katerina Koneva's killer. After examining the crime scene, they found hairs and fingerprints belonging to the unidentified assailant, but were unable to match them to any convicted offenders whose details were being held.

=== Suspected victims ===
Although no crimes committed between June 1997 and his final arrest in 2002 have been definitively linked to Kunowski, he has been identified as the prime suspect in the disappearances of two women, both of whom disappeared in Ealing. The first of these two cases involved 19-year-old University of West London student Elizabeth Chau, who vanished in April 1999. The second case was that of 27-year-old Lola Shenkoya, who disappeared several months later while walking home from her workplace.

== Arrest, trial and imprisonment ==
In 2002, Kunowski lured a 21-year-old Korean student to his Acton apartment, ostensibly to sell to her. When she entered, he began choking and raping her. This time, however, his victim escaped and later told the authorities about her attacker. Kunowski was quickly located, arrested, and sentenced to 9 years imprisonment for rape. While in prison, Kunowski's DNA was uploaded in a police database to check if he could be linked to any unsolved crimes. As a result, both his DNA and fingerprints were found to be a positive match with the ones found on the cardigan worn by Katerina Koneva. Following this revelation, the case caused a media frenzy, prompting a further investigation into the criminal's past. The English authorities initiated interviews with Kunowski, during which he confessed that he was evading the Polish police due to charges of rape. After cross-checking his claims, his extensive record of rapes dating back to the 1970s was revealed to the public.

In March 2004, Kunowski faced trial at the Old Bailey for the murder of Katerina Koneva, and he was found guilty on all charges. He was sentenced to a whole life order, meaning he would never be eligible for parole. Following his conviction, several members of the prosecution and police force labelled him as one of the most dangerous and prolific sex offenders they had ever encountered.

== Death ==
Andrzej Kunowski died in HM Prison Frankland on 23 September 2009 from heart failure. Shortly after his death, an appeal was made to the public to possibly connect him to any further rapes or murders in England. However, as of 2026, there have been no new developments.

== See also ==
- List of serial rapists
- List of prisoners with whole life orders

== In the media ==
- An episode for the fourth season of Britain's Most Evil Killers was dedicated to the case.
