= Red Lion Chambers =

Barristers' chambers in London, England

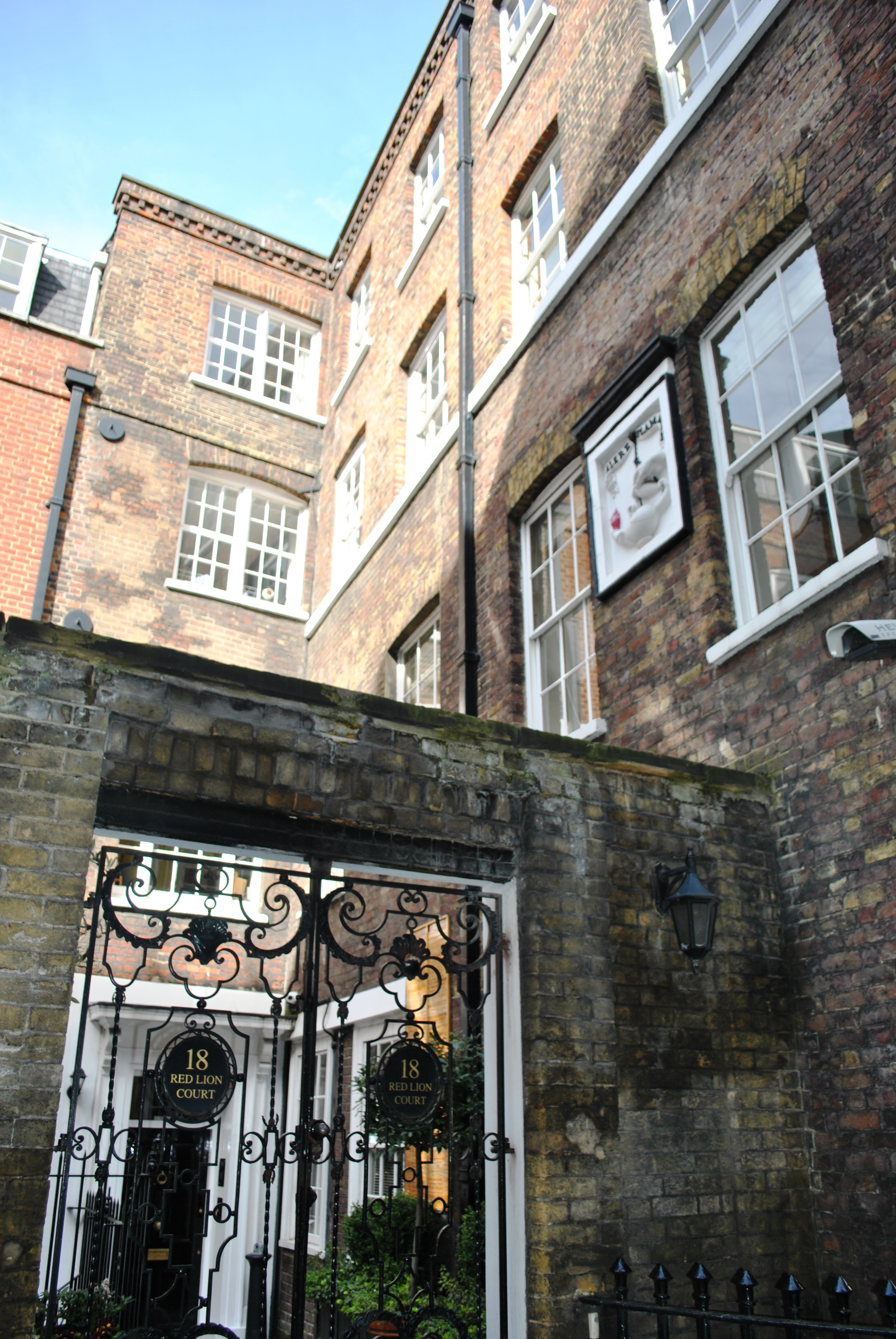
- Headquarters: 18 Red Lion Court, City of London, EC4A; United Kingdom
- No. of offices: 2: London and Chelmsford
- Offices: London, United Kingdom
- No. of lawyers: 108 barristers
- Major practice areas: Crime, Fraud & Business Crime, Inquiries & Appellate work, Regulatory & Professional Discipline, International.
- Key people: Gillian Jones KC and Tom Forster KC (Heads of Chambers)
- Date founded: 1950
- Website: www.redlionchambers.co.uk

Red Lion Chambers is a UK set of barristers' chambers, specialising in criminal law, formerly known as 18 Red Lion Court.

The set was established in 1950 by Frederick Lawton (later a Lord Justice of Appeal) at 5 King's Bench Walk before moving to 18 Red Lion Court in 1997. The current heads of chambers are Gillian Jones KC and Tom Forster KC.

It is now one of the largest sets of criminal barristers in the country with over 100 members in London and Chelmsford and is ranked as a leading criminal set by the main law directories, the Legal 500 and Chambers and Partners.

Members of chambers have prosecuted and defended in many famous criminal cases with former head of chambers Anthony Arlidge KC successfully defending David Moor and prosecuting Jeremy Bamber for murder; Max Hill KC prosecuting in the second Damilola Taylor murder trial; and Simon Spence KC in the Ipswich serial murders.

== History ==
The history of Red Lion Chambers traces back to one of the most famous sets of criminal chambers of all time, 3 Temple Gardens. Norman Birkett QC and Edward Marshall Hall KC practised there and from it Fred Lawton left to set up at 5 King’s Bench Walk in 1949. They were soon joined by Michael Havers, later Attorney General and Lord Chancellor. By the mid 1990s 5 KBW was outgrown and Chambers moved to its present home at 18 Red Lion Court.

== Practice areas ==
- Corporate & Financial Crime
- Serious Crime
- Public Inquiries & Inquests
- Professional Disciplinary & Regulatory
- Health & Safety, Environmental & Fire Law
- International
- Public Law and Human Rights

== Consulting services ==
RLConsulting is an initiative associated with Red Lion Chambers and led by Dame Linda Dobbs DBE, providing consulting services including judicial and legal training, law and order sector reform, mediation and facilitation, conducting investigations/inquiries, policy design and implementation and public affairs/media guidance to law firms, governments, NGOs, corporations and institutions around the world. Consultants include senior judges, police officers, academics, experts in both national and international justice, advisors to governments, corporations, and other organisations.
