= HM Prison Low Newton =

Closed prison for female adults and young offenders in County Durham, England

Coordinates: 54°48′17.8″N 1°33′21.09″W

HMP & YOI Low Newton
- Interactive map of HMP & YOI Low Newton
- Location: Brasside, County Durham
- Security class: Closed Female and Young Offender
- Population: 336 (July 2008)
- Opened: 1965
- Managed by: HM Prison Services
- Governor: Scot Whitehead
- Website: Low Newton at justice.gov.uk

HM Prison Low Newton is a closed prison for female adults and young offenders in Brasside, County Durham, England. The prison, which is operated by His Majesty's Prison Service, is next to HMP Frankland, a Category A men's prison. Notable inmates at the prison include formerly Rosemary West, as well as spree killer Joanna Dennehy.

== History ==
Low Newton Prison was originally constructed in 1965 as a mixed remand centre for 65 males and 11 females. Additional accommodation was provided in 1975 and the capacity of the centre increased to 215, though the centre was normally overcrowded. Low Newton accommodated both male and female young persons and adult women until September 1998, when a re-role refurbishment programme commenced. Since 1998 HMP Low Newton has been an all-female jail taking female prisoners from across the north of England, as well as lifers and juveniles.

In the same year an inmate from Low Newton had to be immobilised by a Taser stun-gun whilst visiting the University Hospital of North Durham. The prisoner was being treated for wounds to her thigh and groin, when she grabbed the prison officer to whom she was handcuffed. The inmate then held a pair of scissors to the throat of the officer and demanded drugs, before being stunned by the police.

In February 2014 The Learning Shop, an initiative set up in the prison to improve women's mental health was closed due to lack of funding. The National Offender Management Service (NOMS), part of the Ministry of Justice, stated that similar support would still be available to prisoners.

== The prison today ==
Low Newton is an all-female maximum security prison and young offender institution. It also holds a small number of juveniles and life sentenced prisoners. Low Newton serves the courts in the catchment area from the Scottish Borders to North Yorkshire across to North Cumbria.

Low Newton is also home to the 'Primrose Project', designed to treat women with 'Dangerous and Severe Personality Disorders', the only women's prison in the United Kingdom with such a unit.

== Notable inmates ==
Notable people to have been held in the prison include:

=== Current ===
- Joanna Dennehy – spree killer convicted of murdering three men and attempting to murder two others.
  - Emma Aitken – murderer, former lover of Dennehy in prison.

=== Former ===
- Sharon Carr – youngest female murderer in the UK who killed at age 12. She briefly spent time at Low Newton in 2018 and 2019 before being moved after another violent incident with another inmate
- Tracey Connelly – known for her part in the abuse and killing of Baby P
- Anne Darwin – wife of John Darwin, who faked his own death with the help of Anne in an initially successful bid to fraudulently claim financial benefits
- Lucy Letby – NHS nurse convicted of the murders of seven infants
- Bernadette McNeilly – Leader of a group that tortured and murdered 16-year-old Suzanne Capper, released in 2015
- Barbara Salisbury – nurse convicted of the attempted murder of two elderly patients in order to "free up beds", was also charged but not convicted of other attempted murders/murders of patients
- Rose West – serial killer, former wife of Fred West
- Rebecca Holloway – woman convicted of rape, after gang-raping an underage girl and attempting to gang-rape an underage boy, with her Tinder date Oliver Wilson. Died in prison on the 13th of February, 2025.
