= Newcastle Law Courts =

Judicial building in Newcastle upon Tyne, England

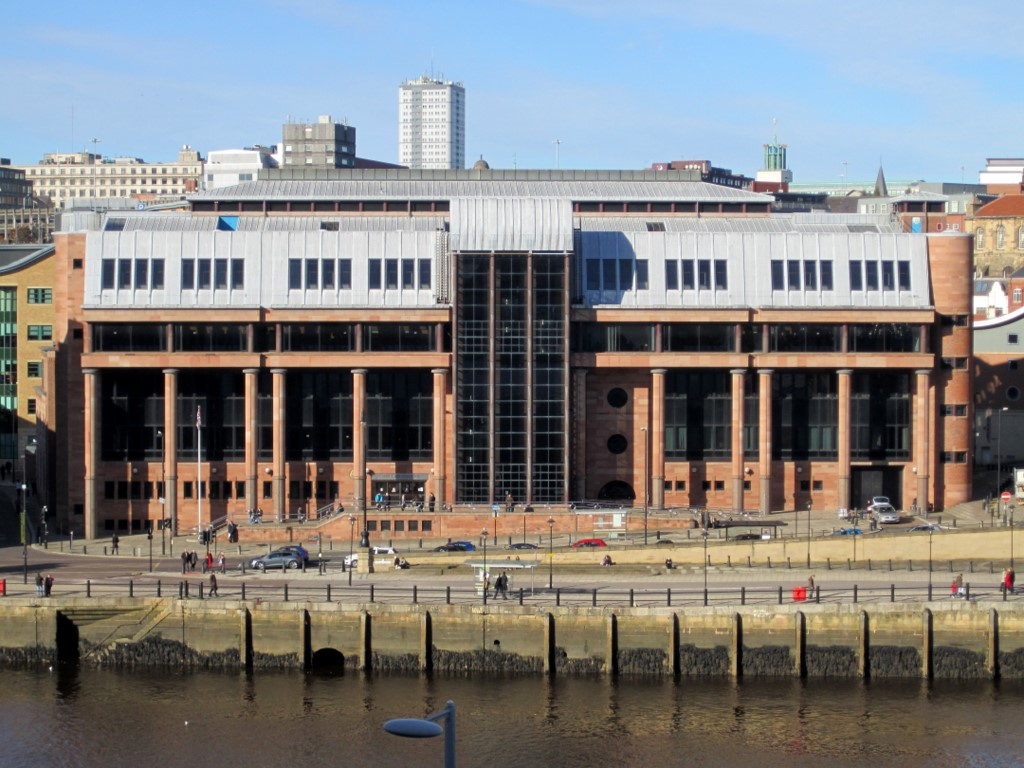
- Newcastle Law Courts

- Shown in Tyne and Wear
- 54.9699°N 1.6034°W
- Location: Quayside, Newcastle upon Tyne

History
- Built: 1990

Site notes
- Architect: Napper Collerton
- Architectural style: Modernist style

The Newcastle Law Courts is a Crown Court venue, which deals with criminal cases, as well as a magistrates' court venue, on the Quayside in Newcastle upon Tyne, England.

== History ==
Until the 1980s, all Crown Court cases were heard in the Moot Hall at Castle Garth. However, as the number of court cases in Newcastle upon Tyne grew, it became necessary to commission a more modern courthouse for criminal matters: the site selected by the Lord Chancellor's Department had been occupied by some dilapidated shops and warehouses and formed part of a larger development by Tyne and Wear Development Corporation to re-develop the East Quayside area.

Construction on the new building commenced in 1984. It was designed by local architects, Napper Collerton, in the modern style, built by John Laing Construction in red sandstone from Dumfriesshire at a cost of £17.1 million, and was completed in 1990. The design involved a symmetrical main frontage of nine bays facing on to the Quayside. The central bay, which was projected forward, was formed by a full-height glass atrium with a curved roof. The wings featured twelve full-height columns supporting a gallery. The rear elevation featured a series of oculi intended to recall nautical portholes. Internally, the building was laid out to accommodate 17 courtrooms.

Notable cases heard at the crown court include the trial and conviction of the nurse, Colin Norris, in March 2008, for the murder of four elderly patients and the attempted murder of another in two hospitals in Leeds, the trial and conviction of Yusuf Jama, in December 2006, and of Mustaf Jama, in July 2009, for the murder of Sharon Beshenivsky, and the trial and conviction of Carl Beech, in July 2019, following a police investigation into false allegations of historic child abuse, on charges of perverting the course of justice, fraud and child sex abuse.
