= HM Prison Frankland =

Men's prison in County Durham, England

Coordinates: 54.80531°N 1.551089°W

HMP Frankland
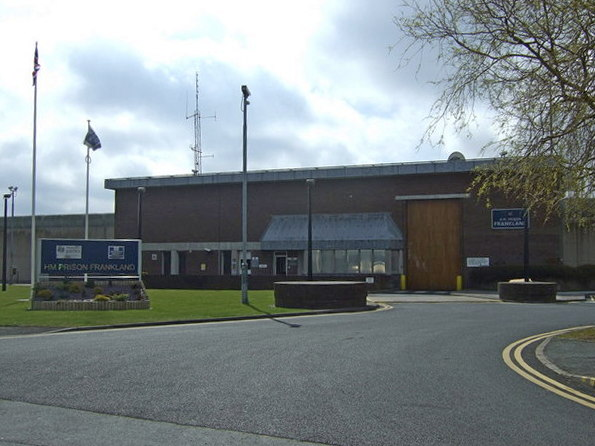
- HM Prison Frankland in 2013
- Interactive map of HMP Frankland
- Location: Brasside, County Durham
- Security class: Adult Male/Category A
- Population: Around 850 (August 2022)
- Opened: 1983; 43 years ago
- Managed by: HM Prison Services
- Governor: Darren Finley
- Website: Frankland at justice.gov.uk

HM Prison Frankland is a Category A men's prison located in the village of Brasside in County Durham, England. Frankland is operated by His Majesty's Prison Service, and is located next to HM Prison Low Newton, a closed women's prison.

The prison has been nicknamed the "Monster Mansion" along with HM Prison Wakefield, due to the high number of high-profile, high-risk sex offenders, murderers and terrorists imprisoned there.

== History ==
Frankland opened in 1983 with four wings, each holding 108 in single cells. A further two wings opened in 1998 to an open gallery design to hold an additional 206. A specialist Dangerous and Severe Personality Disorder (DSPD) unit opened at the prison in May 2004.

The prison has increased in size in recent years following major redevelopment including the construction of the new DSPD "Westgate Unit". In March 2008, the Ministry of Justice announced that Frankland would be expanded again, with planning permission being granted for an additional 120 places at the prison.

In 2011, two convicted prisoners, Nathan Mann and Michael Parr, disemboweled fellow inmate Mitchell Harrison in order to eat his liver.

In 2025, an investigation by The Times revealed that prisoners who refused to convert to Islam and join Islamic gangs operating in Frankland were placed into isolation units for their own safety. Measures designed to stop imprisoned Islamist terrorists from radicalising other inmates had become obsolete due to the sheer number involved in Islamic gangs. Attempts to exert authority by prison staff had been hampered due to fears of being labelled racist and cultural sensitivities. In 2024, Steve Gallant, a former inmate of Frankland who intervened to stop the London Bridge attack in 2019, also claimed that the balance of power in Frankland had been ceded to Islamist gangs with prison staff failing to sufficiently intervene due to fears of being called racist. A prison service spokesman denied the findings reported by The Times.

On 12 April 2025, inmate Hashem Abedi, brother of Manchester Arena bomber Salman Abedi, attacked three prison officers using hot cooking oil and homemade weapons. The officers suffered burns, scalds and stab wounds and were taken to hospital with life-threatening injuries.

On 26 February 2026, inmate Ian Huntley, a convicted child murderer, was left blinded and suffering from severe head injuries after being attacked in the prison workshop with a spiked metal pole. He ultimately died after having his life support switched off.

== Facilities ==
Frankland is a dispersal prison that holds male prisoners over 21 years of age, and whose sentence is usually four years or more, including life sentences and high-risk remand prisoners. The prison has been dubbed the "Monster Mansion" due to many of its inmates being murderers, high-risk sex offenders and those convicted of terrorism-related offences. Prison accommodation is divided between wings, with wings A to D holding 108 inmates each, wings F and G holding an additional 208, with J holding 120. All cells are single occupancy.

The Healthcare Centre at the prison consists of a four bedded ward and ten furnished rooms, a dental suite, X-ray and a Suicide Crisis Suite. A number of clinics are held, many conducted by visiting specialists. There are also telehealth services and wing-based treatment rooms. Primary care is contracted to Spectrum Community Health.

Education at the prison is provided by The Manchester College, with a range of courses provided - from basic skills to higher education level. Frankland also runs workshops in furniture production, a charity workshop and a sight-and-sound workshop. The prison has a library and gym to support inmates' learning and recreation.

Frankland Prison has a visitors' centre. Facilities include a canteen and children's play area, all with disabled access.

== Notable prisoners ==
=== Current inmates ===
- Dhiren Barot, convicted terrorist
- Levi Bellfield, convicted serial killer who murdered at least three young women and teenage girls, including Milly Dowler
- Damien Bendall, convicted mass murderer and child rapist
- David Bieber, American convicted murderer of police officer Ian Broadhurst
- Peter Chapman, convicted kidnapper, rapist, and murderer of 17-year-old Ashleigh Hall
- David Copeland, convicted bomber and murderer who committed the 1999 London nail bombings
- Wayne Couzens, former police constable and convicted kidnapper, rapist, and murderer of 33-year-old Sarah Everard
- Vickrum Digwa, murdered 18-year-old university student, Henry Nowak, who would later be falsely handcuffed by police.
- Mark Dixie, British serial rapist and convicted murderer of 18-year-old Sally Anne Bowman
- John Duffy, British serial rapist and killer
- David Fuller, English double-murderer and prolific necrophiliac
- Benjamin Geen, nurse convicted of killing two patients and causing grievous bodily harm to 15 others
- Delroy Grant, serial rapist and burglar
- Daniel Khalife, former British Armed Forces soldier convicted of spying for Iran who escaped HMP Wandsworth in September 2023
- Thomas Mair, murdered Labour MP Jo Cox in June 2016
- Stuart Morgan, raped and murdered French woman Céline Figard in 1995
- Colin Norris, nurse who murdered four elderly patients and attempted to murder two others in 2002
- Hussain Osman, Islamic terrorist who placed an explosive at a tube station in London in 2005
- Anthony Russell, spree killer who killed three people in October 2020 and is also accused of the murder of fellow inmate Ian Huntley in 2026.
- Muzzaker Shah, murdered police officer Sharon Beshenivsky during an armed robbery in 2005
- Urfan Sharif, convicted of murdering his 10-year-old daughter following a campaign of physical and psychological abuse
- Michael Stone, convicted of murdering Lin and Megan Russell and attempting to murder Josie Russell in 1996
- Charles Taylor, war criminal sentenced by the Special Court for Sierra Leone for crimes against humanity and transferred to the UK.

=== Former inmates ===
- Hashem Abedi, convicted of 22 counts of murder after aiding his brother, Salman Abedi, source explosives used in the Manchester Arena bombing. Transferred to the prison in 2020, but moved to HMP Belmarsh in 2025 following an attack on three prison guards.
- Michael Adebolajo, one of two terrorists convicted of murdering British Army soldier Lee Rigby
- Kamel Bourgass, murdered police officer Stephen Oake in January 2003.
- Charles Bronson, criminal known as the "most violent prisoner in Britain" and "Britain's most notorious prisoner" to the British press.
- Paul John Ferris, author and organised crime figure.
- Ian Huntley, murdered two 10-year-old girls in August 2002; killed by another inmate in February 2026.
- Adam Johnson, former professional footballer convicted of sexual offences.
- Kieran Patrick Kelly, vagrant, convicted murderer and suspected serial killer.
- Andrzej Kunowski, murderer, serial rapist and suspected serial killer.
- Andrew Malkinson, wrongfully convicted of raping a woman in 2003.
- Dominic Noonan, gangster and sex offender.
- Colin Pitchfork, convicted child-murderer and child-rapist.
- Harold Shipman, general practitioner convicted of murdering 15 of his patients and suspected of killing up to 250 more.
- John Straffen, serial killer who murdered three prepubescent girls between 1951 and 1952.
- Peter Sutcliffe, serial killer known as the "Yorkshire Ripper" convicted of murdering 13 women and attempted to murder seven others between 1975 and 1980.
- Curtis Warren, gangster and drug trafficker.
