= Mark Martin (murderer) =

British serial killer (born 1979)

- Born: 18 October 1979 (age 46); Ilkeston, Derbyshire, England
- Other names: The Sneinton Strangler, Reds
- Penalty: Life imprisonment with a whole-life tariff

Details
- Victims: 3
- Span of crimes: 2004–2005
- Country: United Kingdom
- Weapon: Strangulation

Mark Martin (born 18 October 1979) is a British serial killer who has been dubbed the 'Sneinton Strangler' in the media. He was issued with a whole-life tariff. Two accomplices, John Ashley and Dean Carr, helped him in two murders and they received 25-year and 14-year minimum sentences respectively.

== Background ==
Mark Martin was born on 18 October 1979 in Ilkeston. An only child, he suffered extensive bullying at school due to him having a notable birthmark under his left eye. His father was imprisoned as he grew up and allegedly shared a prison with the Kray Twins. By age 16 he had become a petty criminal. He got married in his early 20s but attacked his wife violently in 2002 and they separated in 2004. By this time he was homeless and slept rough in Nottingham. He and fellow rough sleepers and associates John Ashley and Dean Carr were known and feared amongst the city's homeless community and often stole from their associates. Martin was often known as "Reds" and Ashley was nicknamed "Cockney John". Martin was described as the "leader of the pack", and was said to be a violent, volatile and aggressive bully with a short temper.

== Murders ==
Martin was said to want to seek out fame and notoriety. He openly boasted to others that his ambition was to become "Nottingham's first serial killer".

On the night of 24 January 2005, Martin was with Ashley, Carr and a homeless woman, 25-year-old Ellen Frith, in a derelict flat in Marple Road in Nottingham. The flat was a well-known location for rough sleepers in the area to congregate and take drugs. At some point in the evening Frith started to eat an apple, when Martin grabbed her by the throat and strangled her to death. He then stuck a syringe into her leg before setting fire to the property while he and his associates escaped. Firefighters put out the fire and found the dead body inside.

A man who had been in the flat the night before came forward to tell the police that Martin, Ashley and Carr were in the flat with Frith that night. Investigators established that they were all there at the point the fire started. Police searched for the men and found Ashley, who said that he had witnessed Martin strangle Frith to death. Two days later Martin rang the police to boast, "I think you want me for murder". Dean Carr was subsequently arrested and he claimed both Martin and Ashley had killed Frith.

When he was arrested and brought in for questioning, Martin only answered "no comment" to all police questions. He and Ashley were quickly charged with Frith's murder, but Martin then indicated in interviews that he had been responsible for other murders. Witnesses were able to give names of two other homeless women who had recently disappeared from the city: 18-year-old Katie Baxter and 26-year-old Zoe Pennick. Baxter was said to be in a violent relationship with Ashley and both had been missing since December 2004.

Pennick was last seen on 31 December 2004. Members of the homeless community came forward to tell police that Martin had boasted of killing Pennick and Baxter. Investigators discovered that Martin had lured Katie Baxter to his tent with the promise of 2,000 cigarettes before strangling her to death. Police found the bodies of Pinnick and Baxter almost next to each other under rubble when searching the area next to Martin's tent in February 2005. Forensics established that both had died between 30 December 2004 and 6 January 2005.

== Charges and convictions ==
Martin and Ashley were charged with the murders of Pennick and Baxter. Charges were dropped against Ashley for the murder of Frith. Dean Carr was subsequently charged with Frith's murder although was not charged with involvement in the other killings. In January 2006 all three men were tried at Nottingham Crown Court. Several homeless witnesses came forward to testify about the defendants' confessions to them and all three were convicted even though they pleaded not guilty.

Carr was sentenced to life imprisonment with a minimum term of 14 years for his involvement in the murder of Frith. Ashley received a minimum 25-year tariff for involvement in two of the murders. Martin, the ringleader, was convicted of all three murders and given life imprisonment with a whole-life order, meaning he will likely never be released from prison. On 23 February 2008, The Times reported that he was one of around 50 prisoners to have been issued with whole life tariffs.

Martin became known in the press as the "Sneinton Strangler".

== Documentaries ==
Martin, Ashley and Carr have been featured in a number of documentaries:

- In 2012, a series 1 episode of the Crime+ Investigation series When Life Means Life documented the case
- In 2021, a series 6 episode of Britain's Most Evil Killers documented the case
- In 2021, a series 3 episode of the Crime+ Investigation series Killer Britain with Dermot Murnaghan featured the case

== See also ==
- List of serial killers in the United Kingdom
