= Robin Spencer =

British judge (born 1955)

The Honourable Sir Robin Spencer DL
- Royal coat of arms of the United Kingdom

Independent Assessor of Compensation for Miscarriages of Justice
- Incumbent
- Assumed office 2024
- Preceded by: Linda Dobbs

High Court Judge King's Bench Division
- In office 2010–2023
- Monarch: Elizabeth II

Personal details
- Born: 8 July 1955 (age 71)
- Education: Emmanuel College, Cambridge

Sir Robin Godfrey Spencer DL (born 8 July 1955), is a former judge of the High Court of England and Wales.

== Biography ==
He was educated at The King's School, Chester and Emmanuel College, Cambridge.

He was called to the bar at Gray's Inn in 1978 and became a bencher there in 2005. He practised as a Junior Barrister from Sedan House Chambers in Chester was appointed a Queen's Counsel in 1999, deputy judge of the High Court from 2001 to 2010, and judge of the High Court of Justice (Queen's Bench Division) since 2010. In 2013 he was appointed as Presiding Judge on the South Eastern Circuit. He retired from the High Court with effect from March 2023.

== Sally Clark trial ==
In 1999 Spencer was leading Counsel for the prosecution in the trial of Sally Clark, a solicitor charged with the murder of her two babies. Clark was found guilty and sent to prison. She maintained her innocence and eventually her convictions were overturned at a second appeal and she was freed in 2003.

Clark's husband, also a solicitor, made a complaint about the conduct of Spencer and his prosecution team. A Bar Council appointed QC prepared a charge sheet containing eight acts or omissions prejudicial to the administration of justice, but Mr Justice McKinnon struck out the complaints.

== Jimmy Mubenga death in custody trial ==
In 2014 Spencer was the judge in the trial of three G4S security guards charged with the manslaughter of Angolan Jimmy Mubenga. Spencer ruled that abusive racist text messages found on the mobile phones of two of the guards had 'no real relevance' to the trial. The three were acquitted.

== Joanna Dennehy trial ==
In 2014, Spencer was the sentencing judge for the Peterborough ditch murders, sentencing Joanna Dennehy to life imprisonment with a whole life order for the murders of 3 men in Cambridgeshire, England.

== See also ==
- Peterborough ditch murders
