= Murder of Ashleigh Hall =

2009 murder in England

- Location: County Durham
- Date: 25 October 2009
- Attack type: Kidnapping, rape, murder
- Victim: Ashleigh Hall
- Perpetrator: Peter Chapman
- Convictions: Murder, rape, kidnapping
- Sentence: Life imprisonment, minimum term 35 years

On 25 October 2009, 17-year-old Ashleigh Hall from Darlington was kidnapped, raped and murdered by Peter Chapman, a convicted rapist who was on the sex offenders register. Chapman, who was 33 years old at the time, had befriended Hall on Facebook, using a fake profile to impersonate a teenage boy. They arranged to meet, and Hall thought that she was being given a lift by the teenage boy's father, and got into Chapman's car. After murdering Hall, Chapman dumped her body in a field in Sedgefield, County Durham. The following day, Chapman was arrested by the police on an unrelated matter, and while in custody he confessed to Hall's murder, and then showed the police the place where he had left her body.

Hall's murder was featured heavily in the media in the United Kingdom, with Chapman becoming known as the "Facebook Killer". At his trial in March 2010, Chapman admitted to kidnapping, raping and murdering Hall, and was sentenced to life imprisonment, with a minimum term of 35 years. Hall's murder led to serious criticism of Facebook and of police monitoring of sex offenders.

== Background ==
=== Peter Chapman ===
Peter Chapman was born in Darlington in January 1977. He was brought up by his grandparents in neighbouring Stockton-on-Tees.

Chapman was first investigated for sexual assault at the age of 15. In 1996, when he was 19, he received a seven-year prison sentence, and was placed on the sex offenders register, for raping two teenage sex workers at knifepoint, during separate incidents in Middlesbrough. After his release in 2001, he moved from Cleveland to Merseyside and had eventually fallen off the 'police radar'. This led to serious criticism and a report to the Independent Police Complaints Commission (IPCC). He has been convicted of motoring offences and theft.

== Murder and trial ==
Chapman used a fake Facebook profile, impersonating a teenage boy he named Peter Cartwright, to befriend Ashleigh Hall, a 17-year-old student from Darlington. In reality, he was a 33-year-old man living in his car. Chapman and Hall arranged to meet on 25 October 2009; text messages showed that she thought that the teenage boy's father was picking her up near to her home, and she got into his car. At Chapman's trial at Teesside Crown Court in March 2010, the prosecution said that Chapman had "kidnapped, raped and murdered" Hall. Following the murder, Chapman dumped the teenager's body in a field near Old Stockton Road, Sedgefield, County Durham. Chapman was arrested by the police the following day, for an unrelated matter, and while in custody he confessed to Hall's murder, and then showed them the place where he had left her body.

At his trial, Chapman admitted to kidnapping, raping and murdering Hall, and was sentenced to life imprisonment, with a minimum term of 35 years. Following his conviction, Chapman is being held at HM Prison Frankland, located in County Durham.

== Aftermath ==
=== Facebook criticised ===
Facebook was criticised and accused of a "glaring failure" because it had not implemented online safety advice on its platform. On 9 March 2010, Facebook, as a direct response to Hall's murder, warned under-18 users not to meet people they have only had contact with on the internet, and gave advice on how to stay safe online. They also said they were "deeply saddened".

=== IPCC review ===
Merseyside Police referred itself to the IPCC after then Home Secretary, Alan Johnson, said that the police should learn lessons from Hall's murder and respond to questions about how it had handled its sex offender monitoring of Chapman. The IPCC's review, published in 2011, concluded that under resourcing and poor management had led to Chapman, who had been assessed as a "high-risk sex offender", not being monitored at least every three months as required. Instead, there was an instance where he was not monitored for nine months, and he was reassessed to be of medium risk, but the risk assessment was not carried out correctly and there was no record of Chapman being visited as part of the reassessment. As a result, he was able to "slip away with terrible consequences".
