= Spectrum Community Health =

Social enterprise company in West Yorkshire, England

Spectrum Community Health is a community interest company based in Wakefield.

It developed out of Wakefield Integrated Substance Misuse Services, which was established by the Wakefield Primary Care Trust in 2003. It provides Prison healthcare, including substance misuse services, in Northern England.

The company's employee Karen Jordan won the title of “nurse leader of the year” at the Nursing Times awards for 2016.

It took over drug and alcohol services in York in 2017 when the Lifeline project collapsed.

It was awarded a contract for health services at HM Prison Liverpool in 2018, which will run for five years at £6.5 million a year. It was the only bidder for the new contract, which was surrendered by Lancashire Care NHS Foundation Trust.
