= Murder of Gordon Semple =

2016 murder in London

- Location: 51.5054°N 0.0964°W; Flat 5, Peabody Estate, Southwark, London
- Date: 1 April 2016
- Attack type: Murder
- Victim: Gordon Semple
- Perpetrator: Stefano Brizzi
- Verdict: Guilty
- Convictions: Murder, obstructing a coroner
- Sentence: Life imprisonment (minimum of 24 years)
- Judge: Nicholas Hilliard

Gordon Archibald Semple (13 June 1956 – 1 April 2016) was a British Metropolitan Police officer who was murdered by Stefano Brizzi on 1 April 2016.

Stefano Brizzi arranged on Grindr to meet Gordon Semple for a chemsex party at his apartment in the Peabody Estate in Southwark, London, where Brizzi strangled Semple to death. He then attempted to dispose of the body but was arrested by police on 7 April.

Brizzi went on trial in October 2016. During the trial, he denied committing the murder, but admitted to obstructing a coroner in the execution of their duties. On 13 November, he was convicted for both crimes. In December, Brizzi was given a life sentence with a minimum of 24 years.

On 5 February 2017, Brizzi committed suicide by hanging at HMP Belmarsh.

== Background ==
=== Gordon Semple ===
Gordon Semple was born in Inverness, Scotland, on 13 June 1956. He grew up in the Raigmore area and attended Inverness High School. In Inverness, Semple worked at the Bank of Scotland, and after moving to London in 1974, he continued to work in banking. Semple joined the Metropolitan Police in 1983, later becoming a constable in the antisocial behaviour unit. Semple lived in Greenhithe, Kent and was in an open relationship with Gary Meeks.

=== Stefano Brizzi ===
Stefano Brizzi was born 26 June 1966 in the comune of San Marcello Pistoiese, Pistoia, Tuscany, Italy and was raised Catholic. At the age of 15, he realised he was gay, but hid his sexuality fearing the reactions of those around him. Brizzi studied at the University of Florence, then worked as a computer programmer. In 2008, Brizzi was diagnosed with HIV and Hepatitis C which he described as "a death sentence". He moved to London in 2012 after getting a computer programming job at Morgan Stanley. In 2013, Brizzi became addicted to crystal meth which forced him to quit his job in February 2015. He later joined a support group for his drug addiction called Crystal Meth Anonymous.

Brizzi also became a Satanist as a "rejection of Christian values".

== Incident and investigation ==
On 1 April 2016 at 12:30pm GMT, Gordon Semple left a meeting at the Shangri-La Hotel in The Shard to meet Stefano Brizzi whom he had contacted on Grindr. At 3pm, he was last seen on CCTV at Great Guildford Street. Semple arrived at Brizzi's house where the two organised a sex party, inviting other men to the flat. During a bondage session, Brizzi strangled Semple to death. While Semple was being strangled, a man—identified in court by the pseudonym "CD"—showed up for the party; Brizzi turned the man away, claiming that someone had been sick and the party was cancelled.

After failing to return home, Semple's partner, Gary Meeks, reported him missing that evening. Thousands of people later joined a Facebook group that Semple's niece, Kerry Nicholas, set up to help search for him.

On 5 April, Brizzi was filmed on CCTV at Leyland Specialist Decorators' Merchants, a DIY store near his house, where he bought large plastic buckets, a three-in-one saw set, a perforated metal sheet, bottles of acid, and cleaning products to dispose of Semple's body.

On 7 April, neighbours noticed a "stench of death" (also described as "cleaning chemicals mixed with rotting flesh") coming from Brizzi's flat. One of the neighbours, Martin Harris, confronted him about it and Brizzi claimed that he was "cooking for a friend". Brizzi was arrested after police investigated the flat due to complaints about the smell. Brizzi greeted them wearing pink briefs and aviator sunglasses. While he was being arrested, Brizzi confessed to them that he had killed a police officer he met on Grindr and that he tried to dissolve the body.

Inside Brizzi's flat, police found: "globules" of flesh in the bath, which was filled with sodium hydroxide and spirits of salt containing hydrofluoric acid; bags containing bones; parts of Semple's head; and pools of human fat in the oven. Semple's DNA was found on kitchen utensils, leading to speculation that Brizzi had eaten part of Semple's body. They also found bite marks on a piece of bone and evidence that one of Semple's legs was burned.

Brizzi had taken some of the parts he could not destroy and dumped them in the River Thames. A foot was later found by a member of Thames Mudlark Club near Bermondsey Wall.

While being interrogated, he told police that Satan had told him to "kill, kill, kill".

== Trial and sentencing ==
In October 2016, Stefano Brizzi went on trial at the Old Bailey. He denied murder but admitted to the crime of obstructing a coroner in the execution of their duties. During the trial, he claimed that Semple's death was accidental and a result of a "sex game that went wrong".

On 13 November, he was convicted for both crimes by a jury with a 10:2 majority after 30 hours of deliberation. In December, he was sentenced by Judge Nicholas Hilliard to life imprisonment with a minimum of 24 years. The judge added that the "regret you express now for Mr. Semple's death has to be seen against what you did over a number of days to his body".

== Suicide of Stefano Brizzi ==
On 5 February 2017, Stefano Brizzi committed suicide by hanging, aged 50, at HMP Belmarsh.

== See also ==
- List of incidents of cannibalism
- List of solved missing person cases: post–2000
