= Murder of Sasha Marsden =

2013 murder in the United Kingdom

Sasha Marsden
- Born: Sasha Ellesse Marsden; 7 May 1996
- Died: 31 January 2013 (aged 16); Blackpool, England
- Cause of death: Murder
- Occupation: Student

Sasha Marsden was a 16-year-old student studying childcare from Blackpool, England, who was stabbed to death on 31 January 2013. Her body was then set on fire. It was alleged by the media that she had received threatening emails prior to the murder. The murder received international coverage.

== Background and murder ==
Marsden was studying childcare at a local college. She lived with her parents in Staining near Blackpool.

On the day of her murder, Marsden had been dropped off at the Grafton House Hotel, believing she was there for a job, she had previously attended an induction 3 days prior where she was paid £10, it was revealed at trial that Minto had no authority to offer her a job and had used the job offer to lure Sasha to the hotel to sexually assault her. Her body was found in an alleyway in Blackpool's South Shore district, and a post-mortem examination revealed attempts to set fire to it. She had been sexually assaulted, stabbed over 100 times and her body wrapped in carpet underlay and bin liners.

== Investigation and trial ==
A 22-year-old man and a 20-year-old woman from the local area were arrested on suspicion of murder the day after her body was found. On 3 February 2013 David Minto, the caretaker of a local hotel, was charged with Marsden's murder while the woman was released without charge. Minto appeared in court the following day. He pleaded not guilty on 24 April 2013. He was remanded in custody to stand trial on 15 July 2013. On 26 July Minto was found guilty of Marsden's murder and was sentenced to life imprisonment with a minimum time of 35 years to serve before being eligible for parole.

Minto appealed against his sentence in February 2014, but it was upheld by the Court of Appeal of England and Wales and the minimum term of 35 years was upheld.

== Aftermath ==
Sashas Law was passed in May 2026 giving families and victims 6 months to appeal an unduly lenient sentence, replacing the previous 28 day limit.
