= Peterborough ditch murders =

2013 killings of three men in Cambridgeshire, England

The Peterborough ditch murders were a series of murders that took place in Cambridgeshire, England, in March 2013. All three victims were male and died from stab wounds. Their bodies were discovered dumped in ditches outside Peterborough. In Hereford two other men were stabbed but survived. The perpetrator was Joanna Christine Dennehy, a Cambridgeshire woman, who was later sentenced to life imprisonment with a whole life order.

== Victims ==
Kevin Lee was a property developer, landlord and lover of Dennehy. Łukasz Słaboszewski, a Polish national, met Dennehy through a shared interest in drink and drugs, and John Chapman was a housemate of Dennehy. Słaboszewski was killed at some point between 19 and 29 March 2013. Both Lee and Chapman were killed on 29 March. Lee's body was found the next day near Newborough; Dennehy had dressed his body in a black sequined dress before dumping the corpse. The bodies of Słaboszewski and Chapman were found with stab wounds on 3 April near Thorney.

Dennehy put Słaboszewski's remains in a bin and brought a 14-year-old girl whom she had befriended to see them. After the killings Dennehy's friend Gary Stretch (formerly known as Gary Richards) drove her to Hereford, where she stabbed two men, chosen separately and at random. Both survived. Both were dog walkers; she stole the second man's dog. Another man, Mark Lloyd, travelling in the car unwillingly, was later cleared of criminal involvement in the attacks.

== Victim selection and motives ==
Dennehy, born August 1982 in St Albans, Hertfordshire, grew up in nearby Harpenden and was an absent mother of two young children at the time of the killings. She specifically targeted men during her killing spree, telling Lloyd that she did not wish to kill a woman, especially not a woman with children. Lloyd stated Dennehy had wanted to kill nine men in total, seeking to be like Bonnie and Clyde. Dennehy stabbed men for the purpose of "entertainment", telling Stretch, "I want my fun. I need you to get my fun." She later told a psychiatrist that she had found murder to be "moreish" and that after the first killing she "got a taste for it."

== Court proceedings ==
In November 2013, Dennehy pleaded guilty to all three murders and two further attempted murders. Her sister Maria was unsurprised by the guilty plea and said, "I think she did that to control the situation. She likes people to know she's the boss." Dennehy was held on remand at HM Prison Bronzefield. Assessing psychiatrists later diagnosed Dennehy with psychopathic, anti-social and borderline personality disorders. The trial began at the Old Bailey in London, where Dennehy could be seen laughing during proceedings, stating, "I have pleaded guilty, and that's that" when questioned about her decision. At one point during her trial Dennehy stood up and told presiding Mr Justice Spencer "I don't wanna be controlled by anybody. I don't want to be controlled by my lawyers, by the police, by anybody.".

On 28 February 2014 Mr Justice Spencer called Dennehy a "cruel, calculating, selfish and manipulative serial killer" and sentenced her to life imprisonment with an additional order that she should never be released owing to the premeditation of each murder. Spencer said further that Dennehy was sadomasochistic and lacked the normal range of human emotions. Dennehy was the third woman in the UK to be given a whole life tariff, after Myra Hindley and Rosemary West.

Two men, Gary Stretch (formerly known as Gary Richards), 47, and Leslie Layton, 36, stood trial charged with a range of crimes relating to assisting Dennehy. Both decided not to give evidence in their defence. The jury began deliberation on 4 February 2014. On 10 February Richards was found guilty of attempted murder and Layton was found guilty of perverting the course of justice. On 12 February Layton and Richards were convicted of all other charges.

Richards was sentenced at the Old Bailey alongside Dennehy to life imprisonment, with a recommended minimum term of 19 years. Layton was sentenced to a total of 14 years and Robert Moore, 55, who admitted to assisting an offender, received a three-year prison sentence.

== After the trial ==
After the trial it emerged that the Probation Service was supervising Dennehy at the time of the murders as she had been convicted of assault and owning a dangerous dog. It was later concluded that the staff dealing with her were inexperienced.

== Escape plot ==
Whilst she was on remand before the trial Dennehy was housed in segregation at HM Prison Bronzefield, a Category A prison in Surrey. Prison staff found an escape plot in her diary, which involved killing or seriously injuring a prison officer, cutting off one of the officer's fingers and using the amputated finger to fool the biometric system in the prison. Because of the plot Dennehy was placed in solitary confinement from September 2013 (before the court proceedings) to September 2015 (after the proceedings). She claims isolation left her "tearful and upset" and led to self-harm.

The High Court of Justice rejected Dennehy's claim that her human rights had been violated. Government lawyers argued isolation was necessary due to the nature of Dennehy's offences and the risk she could pose to the public if she were to escape. Mr Justice Singh found solitary confinement was "in accordance with law (...) at all material times it has been necessary and proportionate".

== Imprisonment ==
After her trial Dennehy was returned to HMP Bronzefield. In 2018 she requested permission to marry her cellmate, Hayley Palmer, to the dismay of Palmer's family, who feared Dennehy might endanger her. In 2018 both Dennehy and Palmer tried to kill themselves during a suicide pact. In June 2020 Dennehy was reported to be in a relationship with another prisoner, Emma Aitken, a 25-year-old serving a twelve-year sentence for her part in the murder of a man whose body was dumped outside a social club. In May 2021 it was again reported that Dennehy and Palmer, the latter since released from a sixteen-year robbery sentence, intended to marry.

In 2019 Dennehy was moved to Low Newton Prison in County Durham. On her arrival she allegedly threatened to kill Rosemary West, who was moved to another prison. The government denied this claim.

== In popular culture ==
Dennehy's story was featured in The Murderer & Me: Joanna Dennehy, a documentary that aired on Sky Crime in the UK and Ireland on 21 February 2021. Her former boyfriend and father to her children told his story in an episode of the documentary series The Killer in My Family, which aired on Discovery owned channel Quest Red in the UK.

== See also ==
- List of serial killers in the United Kingdom
- Nicola Edgington, British woman who went on a killing spree in 2012
