= Victor Farrant =

English criminal (1949/1950–2024)

- Born: 18 November 1949; Derry, Northern Ireland
- Died: 3 May 2024 (aged 74); HM Prison Wakefield, England
- Convictions: Rape; False imprisonment Grievous bodily harm Unlawful wounding Attempted murder Murder

Victor Farrant (18 November 1949 – 3 May 2024) was a labourer from Portsmouth, England with convictions for rape, murder and attempted murder. He served a life sentence in prison from 1998 until his death in 2024.

== Crimes ==
In 1988, Farrant was convicted of rape, false imprisonment, grievous bodily harm and unlawful wounding. He was sentenced to 12 years in prison, serving seven years and was released in November 1995.

In December 1995, he attacked Anne Fidler in her home in Eastleigh, Hampshire with three wine bottles and an iron, nearly killing her. She was so badly injured that she had no memory of the attack. She was found in the kitchen by her husband. Fidler was a former civil servant who had been working as a prostitute.

Six weeks later he murdered Glenda Hoskins, an accountant and former girlfriend, at her home in Port Solent, Portsmouth, Hampshire. He hid her body in the attic, then took her car to Continental Europe, fleeing to Belgium as a fugitive. He was arrested in France and extradited to Britain to face charges. Hoskins' teenage daughter found her body. Her three children and former husband survived her.

In January 1998, he was found guilty of attempted murder of Fidler and of murder of Hoskins. The judge recommended that Victor Farrant never be released. The Farrant family expressed sympathy with the families of his victims.

== Possible release ==
In February 2024, the family of Glenda Hoskins were told by probation officials that Farrant was being considered for release on health grounds, having been diagnosed with terminal cancer. Conservative MP Penny Mordaunt subsequently wrote to the justice secretary Alex Chalk in support of the family, saying: "Mr Farrant should never be released. He is a danger to women and has demonstrated repeatedly, that he cannot be reformed. I find it deeply troubling that a man such as Mr Farrant is being considered for release on compassionate grounds when it is evident, he displayed no compassion towards his victims."

Farrant died in HM Prison Wakefield on 3 May 2024, at the age of 74.

== See also ==
- Murder of Helen Gorrie – another high-profile, nearby Hampshire murder case in 1992
