= Jordan Monaghan =

British serial killer

- Born: 1990–1991
- Children: 3
- Conviction: Murder x3
- Penalty: Life imprisonment with a 48 year minimum term

Details
- Victims: 3
- Span of crimes: 2013–2019
- Country: United Kingdom
- Date apprehended: January 2018

Jordan Monaghan is a British serial killer who murdered his girlfriend, his 24-day-old daughter, his 21-month-old son and made two attempts to murder another of his children.

== Crimes and court proceedings ==
- On 1 January 2013, Monaghan smothered his 24-day-old daughter Ruby at their Blackburn home.
- On 17 August 2013, Monaghan smothered his 21-month old son Logan while they were alone in a changing room cubicle at Waves Water Fun Centre in Blackburn.
- In September and October 2016, he made two attempts to smother his four month old daughter.
- On 24 October 2019, Monaghan poisoned his new girlfriend Evie Adams in Blackburn.

The initial post-mortem examinations concluded Ruby died from acute bronchopneumonia and Logan's cause of death remained "unascertained" as neither child's death could be explained by illness, genetic defect or natural causes. After the two attempts on his daughter's life in 2016, Monaghan's partner and mother of the three children Laura Gray ended the relationship, and the child was removed from their custody by court order. Police subsequently reviewed the deaths of Monaghan's first two children and Monaghan was arrested for the murders in January 2018.

While on bail for the children's murders, Monaghan poisoned his new partner Evie Adams with a deadly cocktail of prescription drugs, including tramadol and diazepam, which he had purchased unlawfully on the black market after she threatened to end their relationship.

On 17 December 2021, Monaghan was found guilty of three counts of murder and two counts of attempted murder and was sentenced to life imprisonment with a minimum term of 40 years before he can apply for parole. In July 2022, his minimum term was increased to 48 years, after the Attorney General Suella Braverman referred the sentence to the Court of Appeal as unduly lenient. His appeal against his convictions was rejected in February 2023.

== See also ==
- List of serial killers in the United Kingdom
