= Brasside =

Village in County Durham, England

Coordinates: 54.805°N 1.550°W

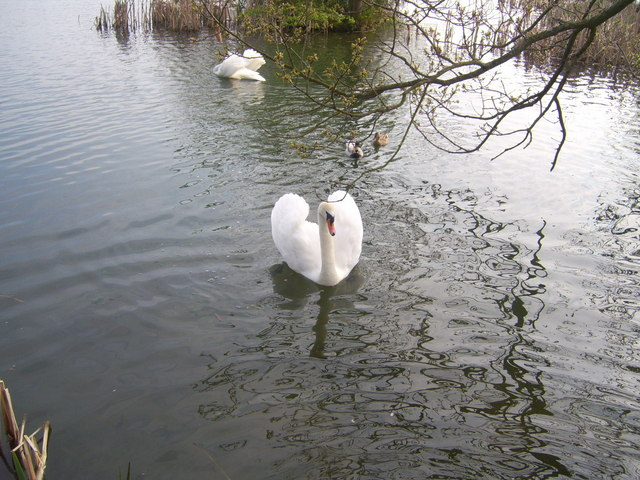
- Mute swans at Brasside Pond

- Location within County Durham
- OS grid reference: NZ290457
- Civil parish: Framwellgate Moor
- Unitary authority: County Durham
- Ceremonial county: County Durham
- Region: North East
- Country: England
- Sovereign state: United Kingdom
- Post town: DURHAM
- Postcode district: DH1
- Dialling code: 0191
- Police: Durham
- Fire: County Durham and Darlington
- Ambulance: North East
- UK Parliament: City of Durham

Brasside is a suburban village near Durham, located in the civil parish of Framwellgate Moor in County Durham, England. It is situated to the north of Durham, and is close to the villages of Pity Me and Newton Hall.

Brasside is the location of HM Prison Frankland (for men, category A), and Low Newton Prison (closed prison for female adults and young offenders). Both establishments are maximum security prisons, holding some of the most violent and dangerous inmates within HM Prison Service, the prison system of England and Wales.

The theme park "Adventure Valley" is situated in Brasside.
