= Quy =

Quy may refer to:

People

- Andy Quy (born 1976), English footballer and coach
- Lynsey Quy (died 1998), English murder victim
- Mitchell Quy, English murderer
- Tim Quy (1961–2023), English percussionist
- Nguyễn Văn Quỳ (1925–2022), Vietnamese composer and musician
- Võ Quý (1929–2017), Vietnamese zoologist, ornithologist and professor
- Brandon Quy (born 1996), English musician and mentor

Places

- Phú Quý, a small island located about 100 km from Phan Thiết city, Vietnam
- RAF Wyton, a Royal Air Force base in Cambridgeshire, England (IATA code QUY)
- Stow cum Quy, a parish in Cambridgeshire, England
