= Killing for Company =

Killing for Company may refer to:

- Killing for Company: The Case of Dennis Nilsen, a book by Brian Masters
- Killing for Company (band), a Welsh rock group featuring the drummer Stuart Cable and singer Greg Jones. Supported The Who in 2007 and appeared in the film Abraham's Point with McKenzie Crook (Pirates of the Caribbean,

The Detectorists) and Erin Richards (Gotham)

- "Killing for Company", a song by Swans from The Great Annihilator
