= Des (TV series) =

British TV series

- Title card
- Genre: Crime drama; Thriller
- Created by: Lewis Arnold; Luke Neal
- Based on: Killing for Company by Brian Masters
- Written by: Luke Neal (episodes 1, 2); Kelly Jones (episode 3)
- Directed by: Lewis Arnold
- Starring: David Tennant; Daniel Mays; Jason Watkins
- Theme music composer: Sarah Warne
- Composer: Sarah Warne
- Country of origin: United Kingdom
- Original language: English
- No. of series: 1
- No. of episodes: 3

Production
- Executive producers: Lewis Arnold; Willow Grylls; Luke Neal; Charles Pattinson; Elaine Pyke; David Tennant; Kim Varvell
- Producer: David Meanti
- Cinematography: Mark Wolf
- Editor: Sacha Szwarc
- Production company: New Pictures

Original release
- Network: ITV
- Release: 14 September – 16 September 2020

Des is a British three-part television drama miniseries, based on the 1983 arrest of Scottish serial killer Dennis Nilsen, after the discovery of human remains causing the blockage of a drain near his home. The series premiered on 14 September 2020.

== Cast ==
- David Tennant as Dennis Nilsen, serial killer
- Daniel Mays as Detective Chief Inspector Peter Jay
- Jason Watkins as biographer Brian Masters
- Ron Cook as DSI Geoff Chambers
- Barry Ward as DI Steve McCusker
- Ben Bailey Smith as DC Brian Lodge
- Ross Anderson as Douglas Stewart, one of the attempted murder victims
- Laurie Kynaston as Carl Stottor, one of the attempted murder victims
- Jamie Parker as Allan Green QC, trial prosecution counsel
- Pip Torrens as Ivan Lawrence QC, trial defence counsel
- Ken Bones as Justice David Croom-Johnson, trial judge
- Bronagh Waugh as Charlotte Proctor
- Chanel Cresswell as Lesley Mead

== Episodes ==
No.	Episode	Directed by	Written by	Original release date	UK viewers (millions)
1	Episode 1	Lewis Arnold	Luke Neal	14 September 2020	11.95
2	Episode 2	Lewis Arnold	Luke Neal	15 September 2020	10.70
3	Episode 3	Lewis Arnold	Kelly Jones	16 September 2020	10.93

== Production ==
In November 2019, production began on Des, starring David Tennant as Dennis Nilsen. The drama is the eleventh in a sequence of ITV miniseries featuring notorious British murder cases of the past two centuries, following on from This Is Personal: The Hunt for the Yorkshire Ripper (2000), Shipman (2002), A Is for Acid (2002), The Brides in the Bath (2003), See No Evil: The Moors Murders (2006), Appropriate Adult (2011), Dark Angel (2016), In Plain Sight (2016), Little Boy Blue (2017), and White House Farm (2020). It was followed by The Pembrokeshire Murders (2021).

== Reception ==
=== Ratings ===
The premiere episode was watched live by 5.4 million viewers on ITV, a benchmark previously hit in 2019 with Cleaning Up. The peak was 5.9 and nearly a third of all viewers were watching it at the time of its airing.

=== Critical reception ===
Rotten Tomatoes reported an approval rating of 89%. The website's critics consensus reads, "Des is a smartly scripted, sufficiently eerie true crime drama anchored by a chilling performance from David Tennant."

The series was well received by critics and described as a "sensitive, finely worked drama showing the unrelentingly bleak reality of the monstrous narcissist". Tennant's performance was considered "one of his best in an impeccable career".

=== Awards ===
In 2021, David Tennant won the International Emmy Award for Best Actor, at the 49th International Emmy Awards, for his role in the show.
