= Dennis Nilsen =

Scottish serial killer (1945–2018)

- Mug shot of Nilsen taken after his arrest in February 1983
- Born: Dennis Andrew Nilsen; 23 November 1945; Fraserburgh, Scotland
- Died: 12 May 2018 (aged 72); York, England
- Other name: The Muswell Hill Murderer
- Convictions: Murder (6 counts); Attempted murder (2 counts)
- Penalty: Life imprisonment (whole life tariff)

Details
- Victims: 12–15
- Span of crimes: 30 December 1978 – 26 January 1983
- Country: United Kingdom
- Date apprehended: 9 February 1983
- Imprisoned at: HM Prison Full Sutton

Dennis Andrew Nilsen (23 November 1945 – 12 May 2018) was a Scottish serial killer and necrophile who murdered at least twelve young men and boys between 1978 and 1983. Convicted at the Old Bailey of six counts of murder and two of attempted murder, Nilsen was sentenced to life imprisonment on 4 November 1983, with a recommendation that he serve a minimum of 25 years; this recommendation was later changed to a whole life tariff in December 1994. In his later years, Nilsen was imprisoned at HM Prison Full Sutton in the East Riding of Yorkshire.

All of Nilsen's murders were committed at the two North London addresses where he lived between 1978 and 1983. His victims were lured to these addresses through deception and killed by strangulation, sometimes accompanied by drowning. Following each murder, Nilsen performed a ritual in which he bathed and dressed the victim's body, which he retained for extended periods, before dissecting and disposing of the remains by burning them in a bonfire or flushing them down a toilet.

Nilsen became known as the Muswell Hill Murderer, as he committed his later murders in the Muswell Hill district of North London. He died at York Hospital on 12 May 2018 of a pulmonary embolism and a retroperitoneal haemorrhage, which occurred following surgery to repair an abdominal aortic aneurysm.

== Early life ==
=== Childhood ===
Dennis Andrew Nilsen was born on 23 November 1945 in Fraserburgh, Aberdeenshire, the second of three children born to Elizabeth Duthie Whyte and Olav Magnus Moksheim (who had adopted the surname Nilsen). Moksheim was a Norwegian soldier who had travelled to Scotland in 1940 as part of the Free Norwegian Forces following the German invasion of Norway. After a brief courtship, he married Whyte in May 1942, and the newlyweds moved into her parents' residence.

The marriage between Nilsen's parents was difficult. His father did not view married life with any seriousness, being preoccupied with his duties with the Free Norwegian Forces and making little attempt to spend much time with or find a new home for his wife. After the birth of her third child, Nilsen's mother concluded she had "rushed into marriage without thinking". The couple divorced in 1948. All three of the couple's children – Olav Jr., Dennis and Sylvia – were conceived on their father's brief visits to their mother's household. Her parents, Andrew and Lily (née Duthie) Whyte, who had never approved of their daughter's choice of husband, were supportive of their daughter following her divorce and considerate of their grandchildren.

Nilsen was a quiet yet adventurous child. His earliest memories were of family picnics in the Scottish countryside with his mother and siblings, of his grandparents' pious lifestyle (which he later described as "cold and dour"), and of being taken on long country walks carried on the shoulders of his maternal grandfather, to whom he was particularly close. Olav Jr. and Sylvia occasionally accompanied Nilsen and his grandfather on these walks. Despite being only five years old, Nilsen vividly recalled these walks as being "very long ... along the harbour, across the wide stretch of beach, up to the sand dunes, which rise thirty feet behind the beach ... and on to Inverallochy". He later described this stage of his childhood as one of contentment and his grandfather of being his "great hero and protector", adding that whenever his grandfather (who was a fisherman) was at sea "life would be empty [for me] until he returned."

By 1951 Nilsen's grandfather's health was in decline but he continued to work. On 31 October 1951, while fishing in the North Sea, he died of a heart attack at the age of 62. His body was brought ashore and returned to the Whyte family home prior to burial. In what Nilsen later described as his most vivid childhood recollection, his mother, weeping, asked him whether he wanted to see his grandfather. When he replied that he did, he was taken into the room, where his grandfather lay in an open coffin. As Nilsen gazed upon the body, his mother told him his grandfather was sleeping, adding that he had "gone to a better place".

In the years following the death of his grandfather Nilsen became more quiet and withdrawn, often standing alone at the harbour watching the herring boats. At home he seldom participated in family activities and retreated from any attempts by adult family members to demonstrate affection towards him. Nilsen grew to resent what he saw as the unfair amount of attention his mother, grandmother and, later, stepfather displayed towards his older brother and younger sister. Nilsen envied Olav Jr.'s popularity. He often talked to or played games with his younger sister Sylvia, to whom he was closer than any other family member following his grandfather's death.

On one of his solo excursions to the beach at Inverallochy, in 1954 or 1955, Nilsen became submerged beneath the water and was almost dragged out to sea. He initially panicked, flailing his arms and shouting. As he "gasped for air which wasn't there", he recalled believing that his grandfather was about to arrive and pull him out before experiencing a sense of tranquillity. His life was saved by another youth, who dragged him ashore. Shortly after this incident, Nilsen's mother moved out of his grandparents' home and into a flat with her three children. She later married a builder named Andrew Scott, with whom she had four more children in as many years. Although Nilsen initially resented his stepfather (whom he viewed as an unfair disciplinarian) he gradually gained grudging respect for him. The family moved to Strichen in 1955.

At the onset of puberty Nilsen realised he was homosexual, which initially confused and shamed him. He kept his sexuality hidden from his family and his few friends. Because many of the boys to whom he was attracted had facial features similar to those of his younger sister, Sylvia, on more than one occasion he sexually fondled her as she slept, believing that his attraction towards boys might be a manifestation of the care he felt for her. Nilsen made no efforts to seek sexual contact with any of the peers to whom he was attracted, although he later said he had been fondled by an older youth and did not find the experience unpleasant. On one occasion he also caressed and fondled the body of his older brother as he slept. As a result of this, Olav Jr. began to suspect his brother was gay and regularly belittled him in public – referring to him as "hen" (Scottish slang for "girl"). Nilsen initially believed that his fondling of his sister may have been evidence that he was bisexual.

As Nilsen progressed into adolescence he found life in Strichen increasingly stifling, with limited entertainment amenities or career opportunities. He respected his parents' efforts to provide and care for their children but began to resent the fact that his family was poorer than most of his peers, with his mother and stepfather making no effort to better their lifestyles; therefore Nilsen seldom invited his friends to the family home. At the age of 14 he joined the Army Cadet Force, viewing the British Army as a potential avenue for escaping his rural origins.

=== Army service ===
Nilsen's scholastic record was above average. He displayed a flair for history and art but shunned sports. He finished his schooling in 1961 and briefly worked in a canning factory as he considered which career path he should choose. After three weeks at the factory, Nilsen informed his mother that he intended to join the army and receive training as a chef. Nilsen passed the entrance examinations and received official notification he was to enlist for nine years' service in September 1961, commencing his training with the Army Catering Corps at St. Omer Barracks in Aldershot, Hampshire. Within weeks, Nilsen began to excel in his army duties; he later described his three years of training at Aldershot as "the happiest of my life". He relished the travel opportunities afforded him in his training and recalled as a highlight his regiment taking part in a ceremonial parade attended by both the Queen and Field Marshal Lord Montgomery of Alamein.

While stationed at Aldershot, Nilsen's latent feelings began to stir, but he kept his sexual orientation well hidden from his colleagues. Nilsen never showered in the company of his fellow soldiers for fear of developing an erection in their presence; instead opting to bathe alone in the bathroom, which also afforded him the privacy to masturbate without discovery.

In mid-1964, Nilsen passed his initial catering exam and was officially assigned to the 1st Battalion of the Royal Fusiliers in Osnabrück, West Germany, where he served as a private. In this deployment, Nilsen began drinking heavily. He described himself and his colleagues as a "hard-working, boozy lot"; his colleagues recalled he often drank to excess in order to ease his shyness. On one occasion, Nilsen and a German youth drank themselves into a stupor. When Nilsen awoke, he found himself on the floor of the German youth's flat. No sexual activity had occurred, but this incident fuelled Nilsen's sexual fantasies, which initially involved his sexual partner – invariably a young, slender male – being completely passive. These fantasies gradually evolved into his partner being unconscious or dead. On several occasions, Nilsen also made tentative efforts to have his own prone body sexually interfered with by one of his colleagues. In these instances, whenever he and his colleagues drank to excess, Nilsen would pretend he was inebriated in the hope one of his colleagues would make sexual use of his supposedly unconscious body.

Following two years of service in Osnabrück, Nilsen returned to Aldershot, where he passed his official catering exam before being deployed to serve as a cook for the British Army in Norway. In 1967, he was deployed to the State of Aden (formerly Aden Colony, now part of Yemen), where he again served as a cook at the Al Mansoura Prison. This posting was more dangerous than his previous postings in West Germany or Norway, and Nilsen later recalled his regiment losing several men, often in ambushes en route to the army barracks. Nilsen himself was kidnapped by an Arab taxi driver, who beat him unconscious and placed him in the boot of his car. Upon being dragged out of the boot, Nilsen grabbed a jack handle and knocked the taxi driver to the ground before beating him unconscious. He then locked the man in the boot of the taxi.

Unlike his previous postings, Nilsen had his own room while stationed in Aden. This afforded him the privacy to masturbate without discovery. His developed fantasies of sex with an unresistant or deceased partner unfulfilled, Nilsen compensated by imagining sexual encounters with an unconscious body as he masturbated while looking at his own prone, nude body in a mirror. On one occasion, Nilsen discovered that, by using a free-standing mirror, he could create an effect whereby if positioning the mirror so his head was out of view, he could visualise himself engaged in a sexual act with another man. To Nilsen, this ruse created the ideal circumstance in which he could visually "split" his personality: in these masturbatory fantasies, Nilsen alternately envisaged himself as being both the domineering and the passive partner. These fantasies gradually evolved to incorporate his own near-death experience with the Arab taxi driver, the dead bodies he had seen in Aden, and imagery within a 19th-century oil painting entitled The Raft of the Medusa, which depicts an old man holding the limp, nude body of a dead youth as he sits aside the dismembered body of another young male. In Nilsen's most vividly recalled fantasy, a slender, attractive young blond soldier who had been recently killed in battle is dominated by a faceless "dirty, grey-haired old man" who washed this body before engaging in intercourse with the spreadeagled corpse.

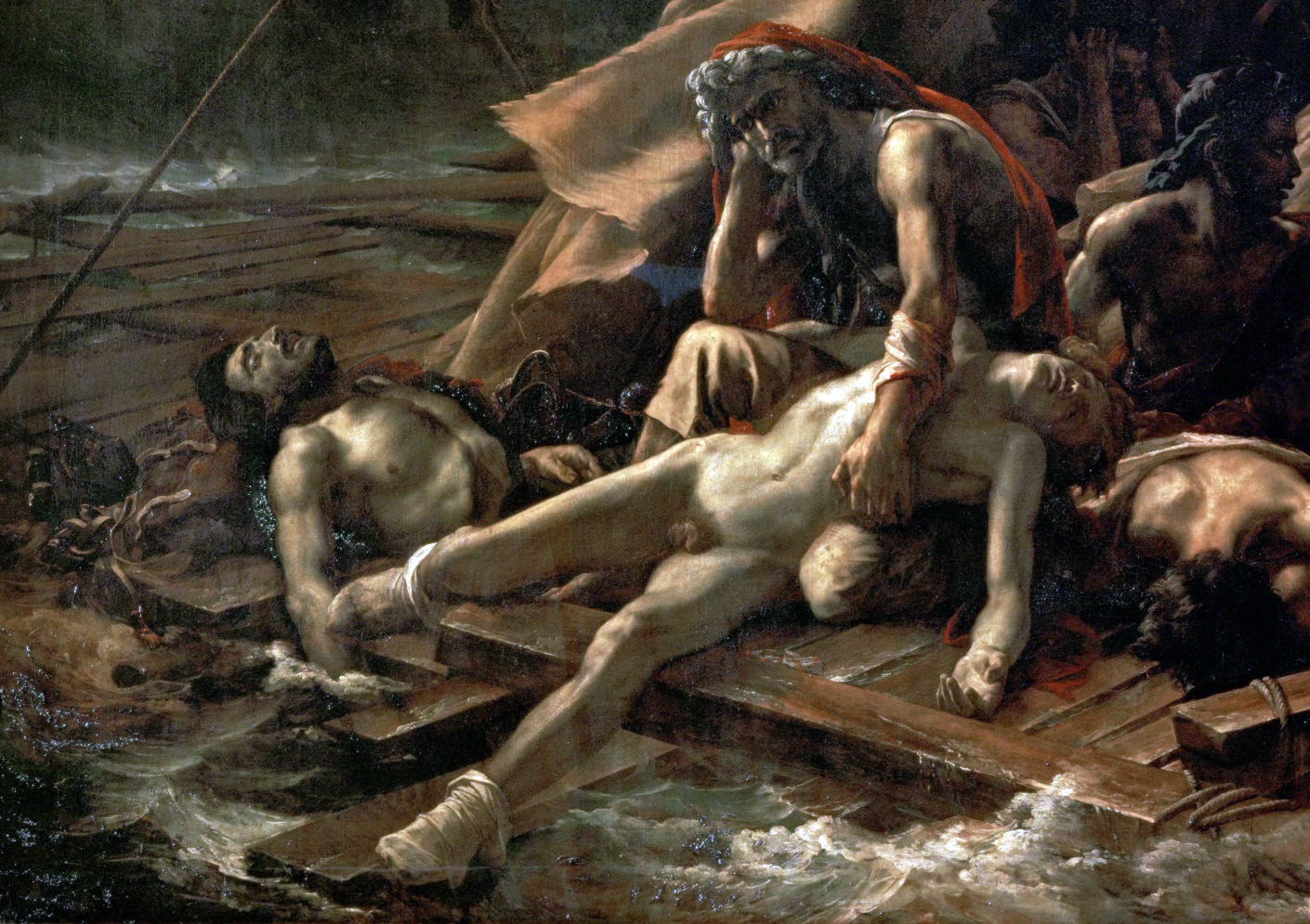
Detailed section of The Raft of the Medusa. The old man holding the nude, limp body of the deceased young male was incorporated by Nilsen into his masturbatory fantasies.

When Nilsen completed his deployment in Aden, he returned to the UK and was assigned to serve with the Argyll and Sutherland Highlanders at Seaton Barracks in Plymouth, Devon. Throughout his service with this regiment, he was required to cook for thirty soldiers and two officers on a daily basis. Nilsen served at these barracks for one year before being transferred with the Argyll and Sutherland Highlanders to Cyprus in 1969. Months later, the regiment was transferred to West Berlin, where, the same year, Nilsen had his first sexual experience with a woman: a prostitute whose services he solicited. He bragged of this sexual encounter to his colleagues but later stated he found intercourse with a female both "over-rated" and "depressing". (Note: Nilsen repeatedly engaged in sexual relations with an Arab youth while previously stationed in Aden.)

Following a brief period with the Argyll and Sutherland Highlanders in Inverness, Nilsen was selected to cook for the Queen's Royal Guard before, in January 1971, being reassigned to serve as a cook for a different regiment in the Shetland Islands, where he ended his 11-year military career at the rank of corporal in October 1972. (Note: Nilsen later claimed to have opted to end his military career due to his disillusionment regarding the conduct of the British Army on Bloody Sunday; this claim was refuted by a former colleague who – having stressed Nilsen had been a known "pseudo-intellectual" among his colleagues – stated: "I have often been struck by how journalists assume what he says is actually true", before adding that a violent fight between Nilsen and a roommate had – alongside other disciplinary issues – been the true reason his military service had ended in 1972.)

Between October and December 1972, Nilsen lived with his family as he considered his next career move. On more than one occasion in the three months Nilsen lived in Strichen, his mother voiced her opinion as to her being more concerned with his lack of female companionship than his career path, and of her desire to see him marry and start a family. On one occasion, Nilsen joined his older brother Olav Jr., his sister-in-law, and another couple to watch a documentary about gay men. All present viewed the topic with derision, except Nilsen, who ardently spoke in defence of gay rights. A fight ensued, after which Olav Jr. informed his mother that Nilsen was gay. Nilsen never spoke to his older brother again and maintained only sporadic written contact with his mother, stepfather, and younger siblings. He decided to join the Metropolitan Police, and moved to London in December to begin the training course.

== Move to London ==
=== Employment ===
In April 1973, Nilsen completed his police training and was posted to Willesden Green. As a junior constable, he performed several arrests but never had to physically subdue a member of the public. Nilsen enjoyed the work but missed the comradeship of the army. He began to drink alone in the evenings. During the summer and autumn of 1973, Nilsen began frequenting gay pubs and engaged in several casual liaisons with men. He viewed these encounters as "soul-destroying" liaisons in which he "would only lend" his partner his body in a "vain search for inner peace" as he sought a lasting relationship. In August, following a failed relationship, Nilsen came to the conclusion that his personal lifestyle was at odds with his job. His birth father died in Ghana the same month, leaving each of his three children £1,000 (equivalent to £10,873 in 2025). In December, Nilsen resigned from the police.

Between December 1973 and May 1974, Nilsen worked as a security guard. The work was intermittent, and he resolved to find more stable, secure employment. He found work as a civil servant in May 1974. Nilsen was initially posted to a Jobcentre in Denmark Street, where his primary role was to find employment for unskilled labourers. At his workplace, Nilsen was known to be a quiet, conscientious employee who was active in the trade union movement. His attendance record was mediocre, although he frequently volunteered to work overtime, leading several colleagues to suspect he was something of a loner. In 1979, Nilsen was appointed acting executive officer. He was officially promoted to the position of executive officer, with additional supervisory responsibilities, in June 1982, and transferred to another Jobcentre in Kentish Town, continuing in this job until his arrest.

=== Melrose Avenue ===
In November 1975, Nilsen encountered a 20-year-old man named David Gallichan being threatened outside a pub by two other men. Nilsen intervened in the altercation and took Gallichan to his room at 80 Teignmouth Road in the Cricklewood district of North London. The two men spent the evening drinking and talking; Nilsen learned that Gallichan had recently moved to London from Weston-super-Mare in Somerset, was gay, unemployed, and residing in a hostel. The following morning, both men agreed to live together in a larger residence and Nilsen – using part of the inheritance bequeathed to him by his father – immediately resolved to find a larger property. Several days later, the pair viewed a vacant ground-floor flat at 195 Melrose Avenue, also in Cricklewood, and they decided to move into the property. Prior to moving into Melrose Avenue, Nilsen negotiated a deal with the landlord whereby he and Gallichan had exclusive use of the garden at the rear of the property.

The Melrose Avenue flat was supposed to be furnished, but upon moving in the pair found it to be largely threadbare. Over the following months, the couple redecorated and furnished the entire flat. Much of this work was performed by Gallichan, as Nilsen – having discovered Gallichan's lack of employment ambitions – began to view himself as the breadwinner in their relationship. Nilsen later recollected that he was sexually attracted to Gallichan, but the pair seldom had intercourse. (Note: Gallichan later informed police that he was sexually "uninterested" in Nilsen.)

Initially, Nilsen experienced domestic contentment with Gallichan, but within a year of their moving to Melrose Avenue, the superficial relationship between the two men began to show signs of strain. They slept in separate beds, and both began to bring home casual sexual partners. Gallichan later insisted Nilsen had never been physically violent towards him, but that he did engage in verbal abuse, and the pair had begun arguing with increasing frequency by early 1976. Nilsen later stated that, following a heated argument in May 1977, he demanded Gallichan leave the residence; however, Gallichan later informed investigators that it was he who had chosen to end the relationship.

Nilsen formed brief relationships with several other young men over the following eighteen months; none of these relationships lasted more than a few weeks, and none of the men expressed any intention of living with him on a permanent basis. By late 1978, he was living a solitary existence; he had experienced at least three failed relationships in the previous eighteen months, and he later confessed to having developed an increasing conviction that he was unfit to live with. Throughout 1978, he devoted an ever-increasing amount of his time, effort, and assiduity to his work, and he spent most evenings consuming spirits and/or lager as he listened to music.

== Murders ==
Between 1978 and 1983, Nilsen is known to have killed a minimum of twelve men and boys, and to have attempted to kill seven others (he initially confessed in 1983 to having killed about sixteen victims). The majority of Nilsen's victims were homeless or gay men; others were heterosexual people he typically met in bars, on public transport or – on one occasion – outside his own home. All of Nilsen's murders were committed inside the two North London addresses where he resided in the years he is known to have killed. His victims were lured to these addresses through guile – typically the offer of alcohol and/or shelter.

Inside Nilsen's home, he frequently socialised with his intended victim as the two consumed food and/or alcohol together before strangling his victim – typically with a ligature – either to death or until the individual became unconscious. If unconscious, Nilsen then drowned the individual in his bathtub, his sink, or a bucket of water before observing a ritual in which he bathed, clothed, and retained the bodies inside his residences for several weeks or, occasionally, months before he dismembered them. Each victim killed between 1978 and 1981 at his Cricklewood residence was disposed of via burning upon a bonfire. Prior to their dissection, Nilsen removed their internal organs, which he disposed of either beside a fence behind his flat or close to Gladstone Park. The victims killed in 1982 and 1983 at his Muswell Hill residence were retained at his flat, with their flesh and smaller bones flushed down the lavatory.

Nilsen admitted to engaging in masturbation as he viewed the nude bodies of several of his victims, and to have performed intercrural sex upon six of his victims' bodies, but was adamant that he had never actually penetrated any of his victims.

=== 195 Melrose Avenue ===
Nilsen killed his first victim, 14-year-old Stephen Holmes, on 30 December 1978. Holmes encountered Nilsen in the Cricklewood Arms pub, where Holmes had unsuccessfully attempted to purchase alcohol. According to Nilsen, he had been drinking heavily alone on the day he met Holmes before deciding in the evening that he must "at all costs" leave his flat and seek company. Nilsen invited Holmes to his house with the promise of the two drinking alcohol and listening to music, believing him to be approximately 17 years old. At Nilsen's home, both he and Holmes drank heavily before they fell asleep. The following morning, Nilsen awoke to find the sleeping Holmes beside him on his bed. In his subsequent written confessions, Nilsen stated he was "afraid to wake him in case he left me". After caressing the sleeping youth, Nilsen decided Holmes was to "stay with me over the New Year whether he wanted to or not". Reaching for a necktie, Nilsen straddled Holmes as he strangled him into unconsciousness, before drowning the teenager in a bucket filled with water. Nilsen then washed the body in his bathtub before placing Holmes on his bed and caressing his body. He twice masturbated over the body, before awaiting the passing of rigor mortis to enable him to stow the corpse beneath his floorboards. Holmes' bound corpse remained beneath the floorboards for almost eight months, before Nilsen built a bonfire in the garden behind his flat and burned the body on 11 August 1979.

"I eased him into his new bed [beneath the floorboards] ... A week later, I wondered whether his body had changed at all or had started to decompose. I disinterred him and pulled the dirt-stained youth up onto the floor. His skin was very dirty. I stripped myself naked and carried him into the bathroom and washed the body. There was practically no discoloration and his skin was pale white. His limbs were more relaxed than when I had put him down there."

— Nilsen's written recollections of the ritual he observed after the murder of his first victim.

Reflecting on his killing spree in 1983, Nilsen stated that, having killed Holmes, "I caused dreams which caused death ... this is my crime", adding that he had "started down the avenue of death and possession of a new kind of flatmate". (Note: Discussing his first murder with author Russ Coffey, Nilsen elaborated in 2012: "Man knows not what alienation is until he has experienced the severity of absolute detachment I was feeling on the morning of 30 December 1978.")

On 11 October 1979, Nilsen attempted to murder a student from Hong Kong named Andrew Ho, whom he had met in a St Martin's Lane pub and lured to his flat on the promise of sex. Nilsen attempted to strangle Ho, who managed to flee from his flat and reported the incident to police. Nilsen was questioned in relation to the incident, but Ho decided not to press charges.

Two months after the attempted murder of Ho, on 3 December 1979, Nilsen encountered a 23-year-old Canadian student named Kenneth Ockenden, who had been on a tour of England visiting relatives. (Note: Ockenden was born in Croydon in February 1956; his family had emigrated to Canada in 1970.) Nilsen encountered Ockenden as they both drank in a West End pub. Upon learning the young man was a tourist, Nilsen offered to show Ockenden several London landmarks, an offer which Ockenden accepted. Nilsen then invited the student to his house on the promise of a meal and further drinks. The pair stopped at an off licence en route to Nilsen's residence and purchased whisky, rum, and beer, with Ockenden insisting on sharing the bill. Nilsen was adamant he could not recall the precise moment he strangled Ockenden but recalled that he strangled the young man with the cord of his (Nilsen's) headphones as Ockenden listened to music. He also recalled dragging Ockenden across his floor with the wire wrapped around his neck as he strangled him, before pouring himself half a glass of rum and continuing to listen to music on the headphones with which he had strangled Ockenden.

The following day, Nilsen purchased a Polaroid camera and photographed Ockenden's body in various suggestive positions. He then laid Ockenden's corpse spreadeagled above him on his bed as he watched television for several hours before wrapping the body in plastic bags and stowing the corpse beneath the floorboards. On approximately four occasions over the following fortnight, Nilsen disinterred Ockenden's body from beneath his floorboards and seated the body upon his armchair alongside him as he himself watched television and drank alcohol.

Nilsen killed his third victim, 16-year-old Martyn Duffey, on 17 May 1980. Duffey was a catering student from Birkenhead, Merseyside, who had hitchhiked to London without his parents' knowledge on 13 May after being questioned by the British Transport Police for evading his train fare. For four days, Duffey had slept rough near Euston railway station before Nilsen encountered the youth as he returned from a union conference in Southport. Duffey, Nilsen recollected, was both exhausted and hungry, and happily accepted Nilsen's offer of a meal and a bed for the evening. After the youth had fallen asleep in Nilsen's bed, Nilsen fashioned a ligature around his neck, then simultaneously sat on Duffey's chest and tightened the ligature with a "great force". Nilsen held this grip until Duffey became unconscious; he then dragged the youth into his kitchen and drowned him in his sink before bathing with the body – which he recollected as being "the youngest-looking I had ever seen."

Duffey's body was first placed upon a kitchen chair, then upon the bed on which he had been strangled. The body was repeatedly kissed, complimented, and caressed by Nilsen, both before and after he had masturbated while sitting upon the stomach of the corpse. For two days, Duffey's body was stowed in a cupboard, before Nilsen noted signs of bloating; therefore, "he went straight under the floorboards".

Following Duffey's murder, Nilsen began to kill with increasing frequency. Before the end of 1980, he killed a further five victims and attempted to murder one other; only one of these victims whom Nilsen murdered, 26-year-old William Sutherland, has ever been identified. Nilsen's recollections of the unidentified victims were vague, but he graphically recalled how each victim had been murdered and just how long the body had been retained before dissection. One unidentified victim killed in November had moved his legs in a cycling motion as he was strangled (Nilsen is known to have absented himself from work between 11 and 18 November, likely due to this particular murder); another unidentified victim Nilsen had unsuccessfully attempted to resuscitate, before sinking to his knees and sobbing, then spitting at his own image as he looked at himself in the mirror. On another occasion, he had lain in bed alongside the body of an unidentified victim as he listened to the classical theme Fanfare for the Common Man before bursting into tears.

Inevitably, the accumulated bodies beneath Nilsen's floorboards attracted insects and created a foul odour – particularly throughout the summer months. On occasions when Nilsen disinterred victims from beneath the floorboards, he noted that the bodies were covered with pupae and infested with maggots; some victims' heads had maggots crawling out of eye sockets and mouths. To kill the maggots, he sprinkled salt upon the bodies, then placed deodorants beneath the floorboards. He also sprayed insecticide about the flat twice daily, but the odour of decay and the presence of flies remained.

In late 1980, Nilsen removed and dissected the bodies of each victim killed since December 1979 and burned them upon a communal bonfire he had constructed on waste ground behind his flat. To disguise the smell of the burning flesh of the six dissected bodies placed upon this pyre, Nilsen crowned the bonfire with an old car tyre. Three neighbourhood children stood to watch this particular bonfire, and Nilsen later wrote in his memoirs that he felt it would have seemed "in order" if he had seen these three children "dancing around a mass funeral pyre". When the bonfire had been reduced to ashes and cinders, Nilsen used a rake to search the debris for any recognisable bones. Noting a skull was still intact, he smashed it to pieces with his rake.

"I could only relate to a dead image of the person I could love. The image of my dead grandfather would be the model of him at his most striking in my mind. It seems necessary for them to have been dead in order that I could express those feelings which were the feelings I held sacred for my grandfather ... it was a pseudo-sexual, infantile love which had not yet developed and matured. The sight of them [my victims] brought me a bitter sweetness and a temporary peace and fulfilment."

— Extract from Nilsen's prison journals, written while on remand, April 1983.

On or about 4 January 1981, Nilsen encountered an unidentified man whom he described to investigators as an "18-year-old, blue-eyed" young Scot at the Golden Lion pub in Soho; he was lured to Melrose Avenue upon the promise of partaking in a drinking contest. After Nilsen and this victim had consumed several beverages, Nilsen strangled him with a tie and subsequently placed the body beneath the floorboards. Nilsen is known to have informed his employers he was ill and unable to attend work on 12 January in order that he could dissect both this victim and another unidentified victim he had killed approximately one month earlier. By April, Nilsen had killed two further unidentified victims, one of whom he described as an English skinhead whom he had met in Leicester Square. The other he described as "Belfast boy", a man in his early twenties and approximately 5 ft 9 in (1.75 m) in height whom he had murdered sometime in February. In relation to the first of these three unidentified victims, he later casually reflected: "End of the day, end of the drink, end of a person ... floorboards back, carpet replaced, and back to work at Denmark Street". The following month, Nilsen removed the internal organs of several victims stowed beneath his floorboards. He discarded the organs both upon the waste ground behind his flat and in his household rubbish.

The final victim to be murdered at Melrose Avenue was 23-year-old Malcolm Barlow, whom Nilsen discovered slumped against a wall outside his home on 17 September 1981. When Nilsen enquired as to Barlow's welfare, he was informed the medication Barlow was prescribed for his epilepsy had caused his legs to weaken. Nilsen suggested that Barlow should be in hospital and, supporting him, walked him into his residence before phoning for an ambulance. The following day, Barlow was released from hospital and returned to Nilsen's home, apparently to thank him. He was invited in and, after eating a meal, began drinking rum and coke before falling asleep on the sofa. Nilsen manually strangled Barlow as he slept, before stowing his body beneath his kitchen sink the following morning.

In mid-1981, Nilsen's landlord decided to renovate 195 Melrose Avenue, and asked Nilsen to vacate the property. Nilsen was initially resistant to the proposal but accepted an offer of £1,000 from the landlord to vacate the residence. He moved into an attic flat at 23D Cranley Gardens in the Muswell Hill district of North London on 5 October 1981. The day before he vacated the property, Nilsen burned the dissected bodies of the last five victims he had killed at this address upon a third and final bonfire he constructed in the garden behind his flat. Again, Nilsen ensured the bonfire was crowned with an old car tyre to disguise the smell of burning flesh (Nilsen had already dissected the bodies of four of these victims in January and August, and needed only to complete the dissection of Barlow for this third bonfire).

=== 23 Cranley Gardens ===
At 23 Cranley Gardens, Nilsen had no access to a garden, and as he resided in an attic flat, he was unable to stow any bodies beneath his floorboards. For almost two months, any acquaintances Nilsen encountered and lured to his flat were not assaulted in any manner, although he did attempt to strangle a 19-year-old student named Paul Nobbs on 23 November 1981, but stopped himself from completing the act. (Note: This act of attempted murder was committed while Nobbs was asleep in a drunken stupor. He had no memory of the assault.)

In March 1982, Nilsen encountered 26-year-old John Howlett while drinking in a pub near Leicester Square. Howlett was lured to Nilsen's flat on the promise of continuing drinking with Nilsen. There, both Nilsen and Howlett drank as they watched a film before Howlett walked into Nilsen's front room and fell asleep in his bed (which was located in the front room at this time). One hour later, Nilsen unsuccessfully attempted to rouse Howlett, then sat on the edge of the bed drinking rum as he stared at Howlett before deciding to kill him. Following a ferocious struggle (in which Howlett himself attempted to strangle his attacker), Nilsen strangled Howlett into unconsciousness with an upholstery strap before returning to his living room, shaking from the "stress of the struggle" in which he had believed he would be overpowered. On three occasions over the following ten minutes, Nilsen unsuccessfully attempted to kill this victim after noting he had resumed breathing, before deciding to fill his bathtub with water and drown him. For over a week following Howlett's murder, Nilsen's own neck bore the victim's finger impressions.

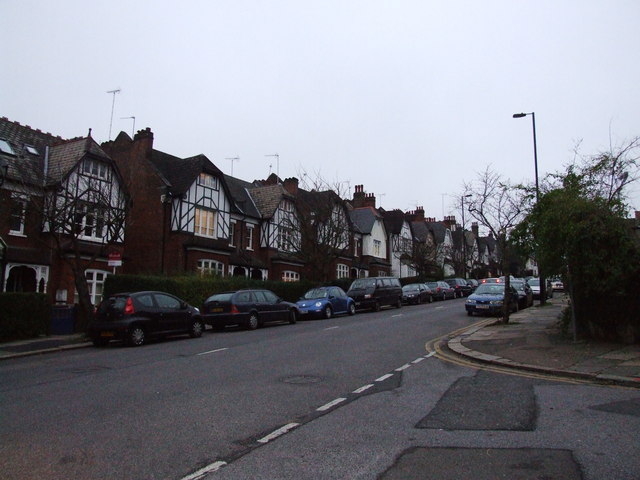
Cranley Gardens, Muswell Hill. Nilsen occupied an attic flat. His practice of flushing dissected body parts down the lavatory led to his arrest.

In May 1982, Nilsen encountered Carl Stottor, a 21-year-old gay man, as the young man drank at the Black Cap pub in Camden. Nilsen engaged Stottor in conversation, discovering he was depressed following a failed relationship. After plying him with alcohol, Nilsen invited Stottor to his flat, assuring his guest he had no intention of sexual activity. At the flat, Stottor consumed further alcohol before falling asleep upon an open sleeping bag; he later awoke to find himself being strangled with Nilsen loudly whispering, "Stay still".

In his subsequent testimony at Nilsen's trial, Stottor stated he initially believed Nilsen was trying to free him from the zip of the sleeping bag, before he returned to a state of unconsciousness. He then vaguely recalled hearing "water running" before realising he was immersed in the water and that Nilsen was attempting to drown him. After briefly succeeding in raising his head above the water, Stottor gasped, "No more, please! No more!" before Nilsen again submerged Stottor's head beneath the water. Believing he had killed Stottor, Nilsen seated him in his armchair, then noted his mongrel dog, Bleep, licking Stottor's face. Nilsen realised he was still barely alive. He rubbed Stottor's limbs and heart to increase circulation, covered his body in blankets, and then laid him upon his bed. When Stottor regained consciousness, Nilsen embraced him; he then explained to Stottor he had almost strangled himself on the zip of the sleeping bag, and that he had resuscitated him. (Note: In a letter Nilsen later penned to Stottor following his conviction in which Stottor asked Nilsen why he had attempted to murder him, but then revived him, Nilsen simply replied, "What passed between us was a thin strand of humanity.")

Over the following two days, Stottor repeatedly lapsed in and out of consciousness. When Stottor had regained enough strength to question Nilsen as to his recollections of being strangled and immersed in cold water, Nilsen explained he had become caught in the zip of the sleeping bag following a nightmare, and that he had placed him in cold water as "you were in shock". Nilsen then led Stottor to a nearby railway station, where he informed the young man he hoped they might meet again before he bade him farewell.

Three months after Nilsen's June 1982 promotion to the position of executive officer in his employment, he encountered a 27-year-old named Graham Allen attempting to hail a taxi in Shaftesbury Avenue. Allen accepted Nilsen's offer to accompany him to Cranley Gardens for a meal. As had been the case with several previous victims, Nilsen stated he could not recall the precise moment he had strangled Allen, but recalled approaching him as he sat eating an omelette with the full intention of murdering him. Allen's body was retained in the bathtub for a total of three days before Nilsen began the task of dissecting his body upon the kitchen floor. Nilsen is again known to have informed his employers he was ill and unable to attend work on 9 October 1982 – likely in order that he could complete the dissection of Allen's body.

On 26 January 1983, Nilsen killed his final victim, 20-year-old Stephen Sinclair. Sinclair was last seen by acquaintances in the company of Nilsen, walking in the direction of a tube station. At Nilsen's flat, Sinclair fell asleep in a drug- and alcohol-induced stupor in an armchair as Nilsen sat listening to the rock opera Tommy. Nilsen approached Sinclair, knelt before him and said to himself, "Oh Stephen, here I go again", before strangling Sinclair with a ligature constructed with a necktie and a rope. Noting crepe bandages upon each of Sinclair's wrists, Nilsen removed these to discover several deep slash marks from where Sinclair had recently tried to kill himself. (Note: Nilsen would later reflect that as he sat staring at Sinclair immediately prior to murdering him, he had thought to himself: "All that potential, all that beauty, and all that pain that is his life ... it will soon be over.")

Following his usual ritual of bathing the body, Nilsen laid Sinclair's body upon his bed, applied talcum powder to the body, and then arranged three mirrors around the bed before himself lying naked alongside the dead man. Several hours later, he turned Stephen's head towards him, before kissing his body on the forehead and saying, "Goodnight, Stephen". Nilsen then fell asleep alongside the body. As had been the case with both Howlett and Allen, Sinclair's body was subsequently dissected, with various dismembered parts wrapped in plastic bags and stored in either a wardrobe, a tea chest, or within a drawer located beneath the bathtub. The bags used to hold Sinclair's remains were sealed with the same crepe bandages Nilsen had found upon Sinclair's wrists. Nilsen attempted to dispose of the flesh, internal organs and smaller bones of all three victims killed at Cranley Gardens by flushing their dissected remains down his toilet. In a practice which he had conducted upon several victims killed at Melrose Avenue, he also boiled the heads, hands and feet to remove the flesh off these sections of the victims' bodies.

On 4 February 1983, Nilsen wrote a letter to estate agents complaining that the drains at Cranley Gardens were blocked and that the situation for both himself and the other tenants at the property was intolerable. The following day, he refused to allow an acquaintance to enter his property, the reason being he had begun to dismember Sinclair's body on the floor of his kitchen.

== Discovery and arrest ==
Nilsen's murders were first discovered by a Dyno-Rod employee, Michael Cattran, who responded to the plumbing complaints made by both Nilsen and other tenants of Cranley Gardens at 6:15 p.m. on 8 February 1983. Opening a drain cover at the side of the house, Cattran discovered the drain was packed with a glutinous, flesh-like substance and numerous small bones of unknown origin. Cattran reported his suspicions to his supervisor, Gary Wheeler. As Cattran had arrived at the property at dusk, he and Wheeler agreed to postpone further investigation into the blockage until the following morning. Prior to leaving the property, Nilsen and fellow tenant Jim Allcock convened with Cattran to discuss the source of the substance. Upon hearing Cattran exclaim how similar the substance was in appearance to human flesh, Nilsen replied: "It looks to me like someone has been flushing down their Kentucky Fried Chicken."

At 7:30 a.m. the following day, Cattran and Wheeler returned to Cranley Gardens, by which time the drain had been cleared. This aroused the suspicions of both men. Cattran discovered some scraps of flesh and four bones in a pipe leading from the drain which linked to the top flat of the house. To both Cattran and Wheeler, the bones looked as if they originated from a human hand. Both men immediately called the police who, upon closer inspection, discovered further small bones and scraps of what appeared to be human or animal flesh in the same pipe. These remains were taken to the mortuary at Hornsey, where pathologist David Bowen advised police that the remains were human, and that one particular piece of flesh he concluded had been from a human neck bore a ligature mark.

Upon learning from fellow tenants that the top floor flat from where the human remains had been flushed belonged to Nilsen, Detective Chief Inspector (DCI) Peter Jay and two colleagues opted to wait outside the house until Nilsen returned home from work. When Nilsen arrived, DCI Jay introduced himself and his colleagues, explaining they had come to enquire about the blockage in the drains from his flat. Nilsen asked why the police were interested in his drains and also whether or not the two officers present with Jay were health inspectors. In response, Jay informed Nilsen that the other two were also police officers, and requested access to his flat to discuss the matter further.

The three officers followed Nilsen into his flat, where they immediately noted the odour of rotting flesh. Nilsen questioned further as to why the police were interested in his drains, to which he was informed the blockage had been caused by human remains. Nilsen feigned shock and bewilderment, stating, "Good grief, how awful!" In response, Jay replied: "Don't mess about, where's the rest of the body?" Nilsen responded calmly, admitting that the remainder of the body could be found in two plastic bags in a nearby wardrobe, from which DCI Jay and his colleagues noted the overpowering smell of decomposition emanated. The officers did not open the cupboard but asked Nilsen whether there were any other body parts to be found, to which Nilsen replied: "It's a long story; it goes back a long time. I'll tell you everything. I want to get it off my chest. Not here – at the police station." He was then arrested and cautioned on suspicion of murder before being taken to Hornsey police station. While en route to the police station, Nilsen was asked whether the remains in his flat belonged to one person or two. Staring out of the window of the police car, he replied, "Fifteen or sixteen, since 1978."

That evening, Detective Superintendent Chambers accompanied DCI Jay and Bowen to Cranley Gardens, where the plastic bags were removed from the wardrobe and taken to Hornsey mortuary. One bag was found to contain two dissected torsos, one of which had been vertically dissected, and a shopping bag containing various internal organs. The second bag contained a human skull almost completely devoid of flesh, a severed head, and a torso with arms attached, but hands missing. Both heads were found to have been subjected to moist heat.

=== Confession ===
In an interview conducted on 10 February, Nilsen confessed there were further human remains stowed in a tea chest in his living room, with other remains inside an upturned drawer in his bathroom. The dismembered body parts were the bodies of three men, all of whom he had killed by strangulation – usually with a necktie. One victim he could not name, another he knew only as "John the Guardsman", and the third he identified as Stephen Sinclair. He also stated that, beginning in December 1978, he had killed "twelve or thirteen" men at his former address, 195 Melrose Avenue. Nilsen also admitted to having unsuccessfully attempted to kill approximately seven other people, who had either escaped or, on one occasion, had been at the brink of death but had been revived and allowed to leave his residence.

A further search for additional remains at Cranley Gardens on 10 February revealed the lower section of a torso and two legs stowed in a bag in the bathroom, and a skull, a section of a torso, and various bones in the tea chest. The same day, Nilsen accompanied police to Melrose Avenue, where he indicated the three locations in the rear garden where he had burned the remains of his victims. (Note: Investigators recovered over 1,000 fragments of bone from the garden behind Melrose Avenue, many of them blackened and charred by fire.)

Cattran contacted the Daily Mirror on 10 February, informing the newspaper of the ongoing search for human remains at Cranley Gardens, leading the newspaper to break the story and spark intense national media interest. By 11 February, reporters from the Mirror had obtained photographs from Nilsen's mother in Aberdeenshire, which appeared on their front page the following day. (Note: As further details were revealed in the press, including that Nilsen had confessed to murdering more people than any other person in British criminal history, the case attracted international attention.)

The 12 February 1983 front page of the Daily Mirror, describing Nilsen having been formally charged with the murder of his last victim, Stephen Sinclair

Under English law, the police had forty-eight hours in which to charge Nilsen or release him. Assembling the remains of the victims killed at Cranley Gardens on the floor of Hornsey mortuary, Professor Bowen was able to confirm the fingerprints on one body matched those on police files of Sinclair. At 5:40 p.m. on 11 February, Nilsen was charged with Sinclair's murder, and a statement revealing this was released to the press. Formal questioning of Nilsen began the same evening, with Nilsen agreeing to be represented by a solicitor (a facility he had earlier declined). Police interviewed Nilsen on sixteen separate occasions over the following days, in interviews which totalled over thirty hours.

Nilsen was adamant that he was uncertain as to why he had killed, simply saying, "I'm hoping you will tell me that" when asked his motive for the murders. He was adamant that the decision to kill was not made until moments before the act of murder. Most victims had died by strangulation; on several occasions, he had drowned the victims once they had been strangled into unconsciousness. Once the victim had been killed, he typically bathed the victim's body, shaved any hair from the torso to conform it to his physical ideal, then applied makeup to any obvious blemishes upon the skin. The body was usually dressed in socks and underpants, before Nilsen draped the victims around him as he talked to the corpse. With most victims, Nilsen masturbated as he stood alongside or knelt above the body, and Nilsen confessed to having occasionally engaged in intercrural sex with his victims' bodies, but repeatedly stressed to investigators he had never actually penetrated his victims – explaining that his victims were "too perfect and beautiful for the pathetic ritual of commonplace sex".

All the victims' personal possessions were destroyed following the ritual of bathing their bodies in an effort to obliterate their identity prior to their murder and their now becoming what Nilsen described as a "prop" in his fantasies. In several instances, he talked to the victim's body as it remained seated in a chair or prone on his bed, and he recalled being emotional as he marvelled at the beauty of their bodies. With reference to one victim, Kenneth Ockenden, Nilsen noted that Ockenden's "body and skin were very beautiful", adding the sight "almost brought me to tears". Another, unidentified victim had been so emaciated that Nilsen simply discarded his body under the floorboards.

The bodies of the victims killed at his previous address were kept for as long as decomposition would allow: upon noting any major signs of decomposition in a body, Nilsen stowed it beneath his floorboards. If a body did not display any signs of decomposition, he occasionally alternately stowed it beneath the floorboards and retrieved it before again masturbating as he stood over or lay alongside the body. Make-up was again applied to "enhance its appearance" and to obscure blemishes.

When questioned as to why the heads found at Cranley Gardens had been subjected to moist heat, Nilsen stated that he had frequently boiled the heads of his victims in a large cooking pot on his stove so that the internal contents evaporated, thus removing the need to dispose of the brain and flesh. He had dissected the torsos and limbs of the three victims killed at this address within about one week of their murder before wrapping the remains in plastic bags and stowing them in the three locations he had indicated to police; the internal organs and smaller bones he flushed down the toilet. This practice – which had led to his arrest – had been the only method he could consider to dispose of the internal organs and soft tissue as, unlike at Melrose Avenue, he had no exclusive use of the garden of the property.

At Melrose Avenue, Nilsen typically retained the victims' bodies for a much longer period before disposing of the remains. He kept "three or four" bodies stowed beneath the floorboards before he dissected the remains, which he would wrap inside plastic bags and either return under the floorboards or, in two instances, place inside suitcases which had been left at the property by a previous tenant. The remains stowed inside suitcases – those of Ockenden and Duffey – were placed inside a shed in the rear garden, and were disposed of upon the second bonfire Nilsen had constructed at Melrose Avenue. Other dissected remains – minus the internal organs – were returned beneath the floorboards or placed upon a bonfire he had constructed in the garden.

Nilsen confirmed that on four occasions, he had removed the accumulated bodies from beneath his floorboards and dissected the remains, and on three of these occasions, he had then disposed of the accumulated remains upon an assembled bonfire. On more than one occasion, he had removed the internal organs from the victims' bodies and placed them in bags, which he then typically dumped behind a fence to be eaten by wildlife. All the bodies of the victims killed at Melrose Avenue were dismembered after several weeks or months of interment beneath the floorboards. Nilsen recalled that the putrefaction of these victims' bodies made this task exceedingly vile; he recalled having to fortify his nerves with whisky and having to grab handfuls of salt with which to brush aside maggots from the remains. Often, he vomited as he dissected the bodies, before wrapping the dismembered limbs inside plastic bags and carrying the remains to the bonfires. Nonetheless, immediately prior to his dissecting the victims' bodies, Nilsen masturbated as he knelt or sat alongside the corpse. This, he stated, was his symbolic gesture of saying goodbye to his victims.

When questioned as to whether he had any remorse for his crimes, Nilsen replied: "I wished I could stop, but I couldn't. I had no other thrill or happiness". He also emphasised that he took no pleasure from the act of killing, but "worshipped the art and the act of death".

== Formal charges ==
On 11 February 1983, Nilsen was officially charged with the murder of Stephen Sinclair. He was transferred to HMP Brixton to be held on remand until his trial.

According to Nilsen, upon being transferred to Brixton Prison to await trial, his mood was one of "resignation and relief", with his belief being that he would be viewed, in accordance with the law, as innocent until proven guilty. He objected to wearing a prison uniform while on remand. In protest at having to wear a prison uniform and what he interpreted to be breaches of prison rules, Nilsen threatened to protest against his remand conditions by refusing to wear any clothes; as a result of this threat, he was not allowed to leave his cell. On 1 August, Nilsen threw the contents of his chamber pot out of his cell, hitting several prison officers. This incident resulted in Nilsen being found guilty on 9 August of assaulting prison officers and subsequently spending fifty-six days in solitary confinement.

On 26 May, Nilsen was committed to stand trial at the Old Bailey on five counts of murder and two of attempted murder (a sixth murder charge was later added). Throughout this committal hearing, he was represented by a solicitor named Ronald Moss, whom he had previously dismissed as his legal representative on 21 April, before Moss was reappointed to the role after Nilsen had complained to magistrates he had been afforded no facilities with which he could mount his own defence. Moss was to remain Nilsen's legal representative until July 1983, when Nilsen – again expressing his intention to defend himself – discharged him, until 5 August when Nilsen once again reappointed Moss.

Initially, Nilsen intended to plead guilty to each charge of murder at his upcoming trial. With Nilsen's full consent, Moss had fully prepared his defence; five weeks before his trial, Nilsen again dismissed Moss, and opted instead to be represented by Ralph Haeems, upon whose advice Nilsen agreed to plead not guilty by diminished responsibility.

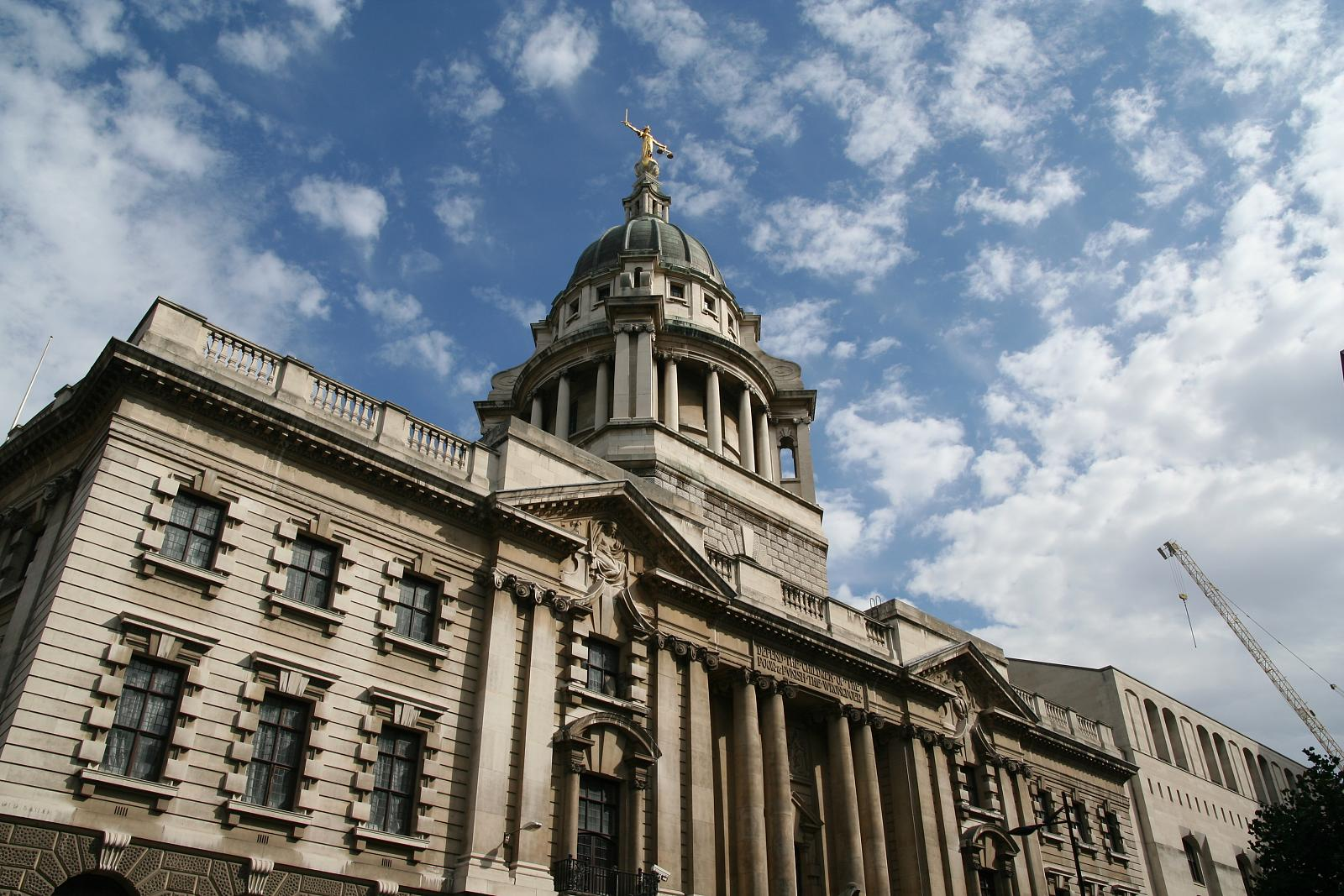
The Old Bailey, London. Nilsen was brought to trial at this location on 24 October 1983

== Trial and sentence ==
Nilsen was brought to trial on 24 October 1983, charged with six counts of murder and two of attempted murder. He was tried at the Old Bailey before Mr Justice Croom-Johnson and pleaded not guilty on all charges.

The primary dispute between the prosecuting and defence counsel was not whether Nilsen had killed the victims, but his state of mind before and during the killings. The prosecuting counsel, Allan Green QC, argued that Nilsen was sane, in full control of his actions, and had killed with premeditation. The defence counsel, Ivan Lawrence QC, argued that Nilsen suffered from diminished responsibility, rendering him incapable of forming the intention to commit murder, and should therefore be convicted only of manslaughter.

The prosecution counsel opened the case for the Crown by describing the events of February 1983 leading to the identification of human remains in the drains at Cranley Gardens and Nilsen's subsequent arrest, the discovery of three dismembered bodies in his property, his detailed confession, his leading investigators to the charred bone fragments of twelve further victims killed at Melrose Avenue, and the efforts he had taken to conceal his crimes. In a tactful reference to the primary dispute between opposing counsel at the trial, Green closed his opening speech with an answer Nilsen had given to police in response to a question as to whether he needed to kill: "At the precise moment of the act [of murder], I believe I am right in doing the act". To counteract this argument, Green added: "The Crown says that even if there was mental abnormality, that was not sufficient to diminish substantially his responsibility for these killings".

The first witness to testify for the prosecution was Douglas Stewart, who testified that in November 1980, he had fallen asleep in a chair in Nilsen's flat only to wake to find his ankles bound to a chair and Nilsen strangling him with a tie as he pressed his knee to his (Stewart's) chest. Successfully overpowering Nilsen, Stewart testified that Nilsen had then shouted, "Take my money!" This, the prosecution attested, reflected Nilsen's rational, cool presence of mind in that he hoped to be overheard by other tenants. Upon leaving Nilsen's residence, Stewart had reported the attack to police, who in turn questioned Nilsen. Noting conflicting details in accounts given by both men, police had dismissed the incident as a lovers' quarrel. Upon cross-examination, the defence counsel sought to undermine Stewart's credibility, pointing to minor inconsistencies in the testimony, the fact he had consumed much alcohol on the night in question, and suggesting his memory had been selectively magnified as he had previously sold his story to the press.

On 25 October the court heard testimony from two further men who had survived attempts by Nilsen to strangle them. The first of these, Paul Nobbs, provided testimony which the prosecution asserted was evidence of Nilsen's self-control and ability to refrain from homicidal impulses. A university student, Nobbs testified that he accompanied Nilsen to Cranley Gardens for alcohol and sex and woke in the early hours of the morning with "a terrible headache". Upon washing his face in Nilsen's bathroom, as Nobbs noted his eyes were bloodshot and his face completely red, Nilsen had exclaimed, "God! You look bloody awful!" Nilsen then advised the youth to see a doctor. Nobbs had not reported the attack to police for fear of his sexuality being discovered. Contrary to the prosecution's claims, the defence counsel asserted that Nobbs' testimony reflected Nilsen's rational self being unable to control his impulses. The fact Nilsen had selected a university student as a potential victim was at odds with the prosecution's claim that Nilsen intentionally selected rootless males whose disappearance was unlikely to be noted.

Immediately after the testimony of Nobbs had concluded, Carl Stottor took the stand to recount how, in May 1982, Nilsen had attempted to strangle and drown him, before bringing him "back to life". Stottor's voice frequently quivered with emotion as he recounted how Nilsen had repeatedly attempted to drown him in his bathtub as he pleaded in vain for his life to be spared, and how he later awoke to find Nilsen's mongrel dog licking his face; on several occasions, the judge had to allow Stottor time to regain his composure. (The evidence provided by Stottor was not included as part of the indictment against Nilsen as his whereabouts were not known until after the indictment had been completed.)

"When under pressure of work and extreme pain of social loneliness and utter misery, I am drawn compulsively to a means of temporary escape from reality. This is achieved by taking increased amounts of alcohol and plugging into stereo music which mentally removes me to a high plane of ecstasy, joy and tears. This is a totally emotional experience ... I relive experiences from childhood to present, taking out the bad bits. When I take alcohol, I see myself drawn along and moved out of my isolated, prison flat. I bring [with me] people who are not always allowed to leave because I want them to share my experiences and high feeling."

— Written statement made by Nilsen to DCI Peter Jay, February 1983.

DCI Jay then recounted the circumstances of Nilsen's arrest and his "calm, matter-of-fact" confessions, before reading to the court several statements volunteered by Nilsen following his arrest. In one of these statements, Nilsen had said: "I have no tears for my victims; I have no tears for myself, nor those bereaved by my actions". Jay admitted it was unusual for anyone accused of such horrific crimes to be so forthcoming in providing information, and conceded upon questioning by defence counsel that Nilsen not only provided most of the evidence against himself but also encouraged the discovery of evidence which could contradict his own version of events. Following Jay's testimony, DS Chambers recited Nilsen's formal confession to the court. This testimony included graphic descriptions of the ritualistic and sexual acts Nilsen performed with his victims' bodies, his various methods of storage of bodies and body parts, dismemberment and disposal, and the problems decomposition – particularly regarding colonies of maggots – afforded him. Several jurors were visibly shaken throughout this testimony; others looked at Nilsen with incredulous expressions on their faces as Nilsen listened to the testimony with apparent indifference. This testimony lasted until the following morning when the prosecution included several exhibits into evidence. This included the cooking pot in which Nilsen had boiled the heads of the three victims killed at Cranley Gardens, the cutting board he had used to dissect John Howlett and several rusted catering knives which had formerly belonged to victim Martyn Duffey.

Two psychiatrists testified on behalf of the defence. The first of these, James MacKeith, began his testimony on 26 October. MacKeith testified as to how, through a lack of emotional development, Nilsen experienced difficulty expressing any emotion other than anger, and his tendency to treat other human beings as components of his fantasies. The psychiatrist also described Nilsen's association between unconscious bodies and sexual arousal, stating that Nilsen possessed narcissistic traits, an impaired sense of identity, and was able to depersonalise other people. He stated his conclusions that Nilsen displayed many signs of maladaptive behaviour, the combination of which, in one man, was lethal. These factors could be attributed to an unspecified personality disorder from which MacKeith believed Nilsen suffered. In response to the prosecution contention that, in attributing an unspecified disorder to Nilsen, MacKeith was undecided in his conclusions, MacKeith contended that this unspecified personality disorder was severe enough to substantially reduce Nilsen's responsibility.

The second psychiatrist to testify for the defence, Patrick Gallwey, diagnosed Nilsen with a "borderline, false-self as if pseudo-normal, narcissistic personality disorder", with occasional outbreaks of schizoid disturbances that Nilsen managed most of the time to keep at bay; Gallwey stated that, in episodic breakdowns, Nilsen became predominantly schizoid—acting in an impulsive, violent and sudden manner. Gallwey further added that someone suffering from these episodic breakdowns is most likely to disintegrate under circumstances of social isolation. In effect, Nilsen was not guilty of "malice aforethought". Upon cross-examination, Green largely focused upon the degree of awareness shown by Nilsen and his ability to make decisions. Gallwey conceded that Nilsen was intellectually aware of his actions, but stressed that, due to his personality disorder, Nilsen did not appreciate the criminal nature of what he had done.

On 31 October, the prosecution called Paul Bowden to testify in rebuttal of the psychiatrists who had testified for the defence. Prior to Nilsen's trial, Bowden had interviewed the defendant on sixteen separate occasions in interviews totalling over fourteen hours. Over two days, Bowden testified that, although he found Nilsen to be abnormal in a colloquial sense, he had concluded Nilsen to be a manipulative person who had been capable of forming relationships, but had forced himself to objectify people. Refuting the testimony of MacKeith and Gallwey, Bowden further testified he had found no evidence of maladaptive behaviour, and that Nilsen suffered from no disorder of the mind.

Following the closing arguments of both prosecution and defence, the jury retired to consider their verdict on 3 November 1983. The following day, having deliberated for over twelve hours, the jury returned with a majority verdict of guilty upon six counts of murder and one of attempted murder, with a unanimous verdict of guilty in relation to the attempted murder of Nobbs. Croom-Johnson sentenced Nilsen to life imprisonment with a recommendation that he serve a minimum of 25 years' imprisonment.

== Imprisonment ==
Following his conviction, Nilsen was transferred to HMP Wormwood Scrubs to begin his sentence. As a Category A prisoner, he was assigned his own cell and could mix freely with other inmates. Nilsen did not lodge an appeal, accepting that the Crown's case – that he had had the capacity to control his actions and that he had killed with premeditation – was essentially correct. He further elaborated on the day of his conviction that he took an enormous thrill from the "social seduction; the getting the 'friend' back; the decision to kill; the body and its disposal". Nilsen also claimed drunkenness was the sole reason at least two of his attempted murders were unsuccessful. (Note: At least two men who survived Nilsen's attempts to murder them recall Nilsen drunkenly muttering to himself about consulting "the professor" with regards to whether they could permanently "stay with [him]" in the minutes before they were attacked.)

In December 1983, Nilsen was cut on the face and chest with a razor blade by an inmate named Albert Moffatt, resulting in injuries requiring eighty-nine stitches. Afterward, he was briefly transferred to HMP Parkhurst, before being transferred to HMP Wakefield, where he remained until 1990. In 1991, Nilsen was transferred to a vulnerable prisoner unit at HMP Full Sutton upon concerns for his safety. He remained there until 1993, when he was transferred to HMP Whitemoor, again as a Category A prisoner, and with increased segregation from other inmates.

The minimum term of 25 years' imprisonment to which Nilsen was sentenced in 1983 was replaced by a whole life tariff by Home Secretary Michael Howard in December 1994. This ruling effectively ensured Nilsen would never be released from prison, a punishment he accepted and declined to appeal against.

In 2003, Nilsen was again transferred to HMP Full Sutton, where he remained incarcerated as a Category A prisoner. In the prison workshop, Nilsen translated books into braille. He spent much of his free time reading and writing and was allowed to paint and compose music upon a keyboard. He also exchanged letters with numerous people who sought his correspondence. Nilsen remained at HMP Full Sutton until his death on 12 May 2018.

== Aftermath ==
In September 1992, Central Television conducted an interview with Nilsen as part of the programme Viewpoint 1993 – Murder In Mind, which focused upon offender profiling. A four-minute section of this interview, in which Nilsen frankly discussed his crimes, was initially scheduled to be broadcast on 19 January 1993; the Home Office sought to ban the interview from being broadcast on the grounds that they had not granted permission for Central to conduct interviews with Nilsen which were later broadcast to the public, and claimed ownership of copyrighted material. Central Television challenged the Home Office ruling in court, citing sections of the Copyright, Designs and Patents Act 1988, and that full permission to conduct an interview with Nilsen had been granted in advance. On 26 January 1993 Judge William Aldous ruled in Central's favour, and the same day, three appeal court judges, Sir Thomas Bingham, Master of the Rolls; Lord Justice McCowan; and Lord Justice Hirst upheld his decision. The interview was screened in full that evening.

Nilsen repeatedly sought legal avenues to challenge real and perceived abuses of prison rules by prison officers – regularly petitioning the Home Office and, later, the European Court of Human Rights with complaints. As a result, he was an unpopular inmate with successive governors at the various prisons in which he was incarcerated. In October 2001, Nilsen brought a judicial review against the prison service, citing that the gay softcore pornography magazines Vulcan and Him, to which he subscribed regularly, had some images and articles of a more explicit nature removed before the magazine reached him. The legal case he brought against the prison service was dismissed because he could not establish that any breach of his human rights had occurred.

In the years following his incarceration, Nilsen composed an unpublished, 400-page autobiography, entitled The History of a Drowning Boy (the title being a reference to his concepts of the tranquillity of death following his grandfather's death and his own near-fatal drowning in 1954). In his autobiography, Nilsen states that, beginning with his service in the army, he constantly lived two separate lives: his "real life" and his "fantasy life". He writes: "When I was with people, I was in the 'real' world, and in my private life, I snapped instantly into my fantasy life. I could oscillate between the two with instant ease." With reference to his murders, Nilsen claimed that his emotional state upon the dates of the murders, in conjunction with the amount of alcohol he had consumed, were both core factors in his decision to kill. He further emphasised that, when feeling low, seizing an opportunity to satisfy the sexual fantasies he had developed in which the victim is the young, attractive and passive partner, and he the older active partner, temporarily relieved him of a general feeling of inadequacy.

Nilsen's first murder victim was identified in 2006 as 14-year-old Stephen Holmes. Formal identification was confirmed via a combination of circumstantial evidence and by Nilsen identifying a photograph of the youth shown to him by police (all bone fragments found at Melrose Avenue had been destroyed). He was not charged with this murder as the Crown Prosecution Service decided that a prosecution would not be in the public interest, and would not contribute to his current sentence.

At least four victims killed between 1980 and 1981 at Melrose Avenue remain unidentified. A forensics expert testified at Nilsen's 1983 trial that "at least eight bodies" had been incinerated at Melrose Avenue, academically confirming he had murdered at least eleven victims. Several items confiscated from Nilsen's Cranley Gardens address – some of which had been introduced as evidence at Nilsen's trial – are on display at New Scotland Yard's Crime Museum. These exhibits include the stove upon which Nilsen had boiled the heads of his final three victims, the knives he had used to dissect several of his victims' bodies, the headphones Nilsen had used to strangle Ockenden, the ligature he had fashioned to strangle his last victim, and the bath from his Cranley Gardens address in which he had drowned Howlett and retained the body of Allen prior to dissection.

In January 2021, a former confidant of Nilsen's named Mark Austin revealed that an edited version of The History of a Drowning Boy was to be posthumously published by RedDoor Press. The autobiography, based upon the 6,000 pages of typewritten notes Nilsen authored while incarcerated, examines his life and crimes and is edited by Austin, who became a pen pal of Nilsen's in the years prior to his death and who exchanged more than 800 letters with him. This autobiography was published on 21 January 2021.

== Death ==
On 10 May 2018, Nilsen was taken from HMP Full Sutton to York Hospital after complaining of severe stomach pains. He was found to have a ruptured abdominal aortic aneurysm, which was repaired, although he subsequently suffered a blood clot as a complication of the surgery. Nilsen died on 12 May. A subsequent post-mortem examination revealed that the immediate cause of Nilsen's death was pulmonary embolism and retroperitoneal haemorrhage.

Nilsen's body was cremated in June 2018. This service was held with only five mourners present, including three prison officers and the individual with whom Nilsen had corresponded while in prison. No family members were present at the service. In line with Ministry of Justice policy, HMP Full Sutton paid £3,323 towards the cost of Nilsen's funeral. His ashes were later handed to his family.

== Victims ==
Nilsen is known to have killed twelve young men and boys between 1978 and 1983; it is suspected that the true number of victims may be fifteen. At least nine victims had been killed at 195 Melrose Avenue, with his final three victims being killed at 23 Cranley Gardens. Of Nilsen's eight identified victims, only three – Stephen Holmes, Kenneth Ockenden and Graham Allen – had a permanent address at the time of their murder, with the remaining victims largely (though not exclusively) consisting of vagrants, runaways and male prostitutes.

In 1992, Nilsen claimed the true total of victims he killed was twelve, and that he had fabricated the three additional victims he initially confessed to having killed at Melrose Avenue, both in response to pressure as he was being interviewed as well as to simply "stick with the figure" of approximately fifteen victims he had provided investigators with as he was initially escorted to Hornsey police station. Nilsen said that three unidentified victims he had initially confessed to killing – an Irishman in September 1980; a "long-haired hippy" in November or December 1980, and an English skinhead in April 1981 – had been invented to simply "complement the continuity of evidence". DCI Jay later dismissed Nilsen's claims to have killed only twelve victims, stating that in the more than thirty hours of interviews police had conducted with Nilsen when discussing the fifteen victims he had initially confessed to killing, he had never provided any inconsistencies in the physical characteristics, the date or place of encounter, the act of murder, or the ritual he observed with the body of any of the fifteen victims.

=== 1978 ===
- 30 December: Stephen Dean Holmes, 14. Last seen on his way home from a rock concert; Holmes encountered Nilsen in the Cricklewood Arms on the evening of 29 December before accepting an offer to drink alcohol with him at Melrose Avenue. The following morning, Nilsen strangled Holmes with a necktie until he was unconscious before drowning him in a bucket of water. His body was to remain beneath Nilsen's floorboards for over seven months before being disposed of upon a bonfire, and Holmes was the only victim not to have been dissected before disposal. Investigators announced his identification in November 2006.

=== 1979 ===
- 3 December: Kenneth James Ockenden, 23. A Canadian student on a tour of the UK; Ockenden encountered Nilsen in the Princess Louise pub in Holborn on 3 December 1979. He was escorted on a tour of London, before agreeing to accompany Nilsen to his flat for a meal and further drinks. One of the few murder victims who was widely reported as a missing person, Ockenden was strangled with the cord of Nilsen's headphones as he listened to a record.

=== 1980 ===
- 17 May: Martyn Brandon Duffey, 16. Duffey was a 16-year-old runaway from Birkenhead. On 17 May 1980, Nilsen encountered the youth at a London railway station as he himself returned from a union conference in Southport. Nilsen strangled Duffey and subsequently drowned him in the kitchen sink before bathing with the body. Two days later, Duffey's body was placed beneath the floorboards.
- c. 20 August: William David Sutherland, 26. A 26-year-old father of one originally from Edinburgh, who occasionally worked as a male prostitute. Sutherland met Nilsen in a pub near Piccadilly Circus in August 1980. Nilsen could not recall precisely how he had murdered Sutherland, other than that he had strangled Sutherland as he himself stood or knelt in front of this victim and, in the morning, there was "another dead body".
- September: Unidentified. All that Nilsen could remember about his fifth victim was that he was a tall Irish labourer with rough hands who wore an old suit, jacket and shoes. Nilsen estimated his height to be between 5 feet 9 inches (1.75 m) and 5 feet 10 inches (1.78 m) and his age to be between 27 and 30. He had met this victim in the Cricklewood Arms in late 1980. Nilsen later claimed to have fabricated this victim.
- October: Unidentified. Nilsen's sixth victim was described by his murderer as a slender male prostitute, approximately 5 feet 10 inches (1.78 m) in height, who was aged between 20 and 30, and of either Filipino or Mexican descent. To Nilsen, this victim had gypsy-like features. Nilsen met this victim in the Salisbury Arms sometime in October 1980.
- November: Unidentified. This victim was described by Nilsen as being an English vagrant in his 20s, whom he encountered sleeping in a doorway at the top of Charing Cross Road. He was emaciated, with a pale complexion and had several missing teeth. Nilsen and the youth took a taxi to Melrose Avenue; that evening, the victim was strangled to death as he slept, with his legs moving in a cycling motion as he was strangled. Nilsen later stated he believed this victim's life had been "one of long suffering", and that the act of killing this victim had been "as easy as taking candy from a baby".
- November–December: Unidentified. The last victim to be killed by Nilsen in 1980 was an English "long-haired hippy", aged between 25 and 30, whom he had met in the West End after the pubs had closed in November or December 1980. This victim's body was retained beneath the floorboards of the flat until Nilsen removed the corpse, cut it into three pieces, and then replaced the dissected remains beneath the floorboards. He burned the corpse one year later. Nilsen later claimed to have fabricated this victim.

=== 1981 ===
- c. 4 January: Unidentified. The ninth victim was described by Nilsen as an "18-year-old, blue-eyed Scot" with blond hair and who wore a green tracksuit top and trainers. Nilsen met this victim in the Golden Lion pub in Soho in early January 1981. Killed after partaking in a drinking contest with Nilsen at Melrose Avenue, the body of this victim was dissected on 12 January.
- February: Unidentified. Murdered sometime in February 1981. Nilsen recalled little about this victim, other than the fact he was originally from Belfast; was slim, dark-haired, aged in his early 20s, and approximately 5 ft 9 in (1.75 m) tall. He had encountered this victim somewhere in the West End after the pubs had closed. He was strangled with a necktie and his body subsequently placed beneath the floorboards.
- April: Unidentified. Nilsen encountered his eleventh victim, a muscular young English skinhead aged approximately 20, at a food stall in Leicester Square in April 1981. He was lured to Nilsen's home with the promise of a meal and alcohol. Nilsen recalled this victim wore a black leather jacket and had a tattoo around his neck, simply reading "cut here", and that he had boasted about how tough he was and how he liked to fight. Nilsen hung this victim's naked torso in his bedroom for 24 hours, before placing the body beneath the floorboards. Nilsen later claimed to have fabricated this victim.
- 18 September: Malcolm Stanley Barlow, 23. The final victim to be murdered at Melrose Avenue, Barlow was an epileptic orphan, originally from Sheffield, who had spent much of his life in care homes. He was murdered after returning to Nilsen's home to thank him for having ensured he received medical attention the previous day. Prior to dissection, Barlow's body was stowed in a kitchen cupboard as Nilsen had no further room beneath his floorboards.

=== 1982 ===
- March: John Peter Howlett, 26. Originally from High Wycombe, Buckinghamshire, Howlett was known to Nilsen as "John the Guardsman". He was the first victim to be murdered at Cranley Gardens. Howlett was strangled as he slept in Nilsen's bed, with Nilsen shouting, "It's about time you went" as Howlett awoke to find himself being strangled. Eventually, Nilsen drowned Howlett by holding his head underwater in a bathtub for five minutes. Nilsen subsequently dismembered Howlett's body, flushed portions of flesh and internal organs down the toilet and placed various "large bones out with the rubbish".
- September: Archibald Graham Allen, 27. Allen was a 27-year-old father-of-one, originally from Motherwell, North Lanarkshire, whom Nilsen encountered in Shaftesbury Avenue as Allen attempted to hail a taxi in September 1982. Allen was strangled with a ligature as he sat eating an omelette Nilsen had cooked for him. His body was identified from dental records and healed fractures to his jawbone. Dissected portions of flesh and small bones from the body of Allen subsequently blocked the drains at Cranley Gardens.

=== 1983 ===
- 26 January: Stephen Neil Sinclair, 20. Nilsen's final victim. Sinclair was originally from Perth; at the time he encountered Nilsen, he was a heroin addict who suffered from the habit of self-harming. Nilsen encountered Sinclair in Oxford Street, where he first bought the youth a hamburger before suggesting that Sinclair accompany him to Cranley Gardens. After Sinclair had consumed alcohol and injected heroin at Nilsen's flat, Nilsen strangled him to death with a ligature. The head, upper torso and arms of Sinclair were stowed in the tea chest in Nilsen's living room; Sinclair's lower torso and legs were stowed beneath Nilsen's bathtub.

== Media ==
=== Film ===
- Cold Light of Day (1989). Directed by Fhiona Louise, and starring Bob Flag as Nilsen. Awarded the UCCA Venticittà Award at the 1990 Venice Film Festival.

=== Television ===
- The Black Museum (1988), commissioned by ITV.
- Great Crimes and Trials of the 20th Century S02E15 "The Kindly Killer" (1993), commissioned by the BBC.
- Real Crime S03E04 "A Mind To Murder" (2003), commissioned by ITV1.
- Born to Kill? S03E05 "Dennis Nilsen" (2012), commissioned by Twofour Productions.
- Countdown To Murder S01E02 "Dennis Nilsen's First Kill" (2013), commissioned by Channel 5.
- Encounters with Evil S01E01 "Thrill Killers" (2016), commissioned by CBS Reality.
- Des (2020), a dramatisation commissioned by ITV, starring David Tennant as Nilsen.
- Memories of a Murderer: The Nilsen Tapes (2021). An 85-minute documentary available on Netflix.
- The Nilsen Files (2022): A BBC Two three-part series re-examining the Metropolitan Police investigation into Nilsen's murders and exploring whether prejudice created missed opportunities to apprehend Nilsen.

=== Podcast ===
- "The Muswell Hill Murderer" (2020). Case 144 of Casefile True Crime Podcast series.

== See also ==
- Diminished responsibility – Legal defense
- Incidents of necrophilia
- List of prisoners with whole-life tariffs
- List of serial killers by number of victims
- List of serial killers in the United Kingdom
- Social alienation – Disconnection in social relationships

== Sources ==
- Biressi, Anita (2001). Crime, Fear and the Law in True Crime Stories. Palgrave Macmillan UK. ISBN 978-1-403-91359-3.
- Cawthorne, Nigel (2014). Bodies in the Back Garden – True Stories of Brutal Murders Close to Home. Kings Road Publishing. ISBN 978-1-784-18179-6.
- Chibnall, Steven; Petley, Julian (2009). British Horror Cinema. Routledge. ISBN 978-0-415-23003-2.
- Coffey, Russell (2013). Dennis Nilsen: Conversations with Britain's Most Evil Serial Killer. London: John Blake Publishing Ltd. ISBN 978-1-782-19459-0.
- Edison, N. J. (2003). The World's Most Infamous Killers. Chancellor Press. ISBN 978-0-753-70715-9.
- Foreman, Laura, ed. (1992). Serial Killers. Alexandria, Virginia: Time-Life Books. ISBN 978-0-783-50001-0.
- Lane, Brian (1993). Chronicle of 20th Century Murder. Wiltshire: Selecta Publishing. pp. 276–280. ISBN 978-1-85227-436-8.
- Masters, Brian (1985). Killing for Company: The Case of Dennis Nilsen. New York City: Random House. ISBN 978-0-812-83104-7.
- Morley, Michael (2021). The Dennis Nilsen Tapes: In Jail with Britain's Most Infamous Serial Killer. London: Hodder & Stoughton. ISBN 978-1-529-37171-0.
- Persaud, Raj; Masters, Brian; Wilson, Colin; et al., eds. (1997). "Murder in Mind: Dennis Nilsen". Murder in Mind (8). London, England: Marshall Cavendish. ISSN 1364-5803.
- Waddell, Bill (1992). "Murder Casebook: Scotland Yard's Black Museum 1875 - 1992". Murder Casebook. Marshall Cavendish: 22–24. ISBN 978-0-748-59926-4.
- Waddell, Bill (1993). The Black Museum: New Scotland Yard. London, England: Little, Brown and Company. ISBN 978-0-751-51033-1.
- Whittington-Egan, Richard; Whittington-Egan, Molly (1992). The Murder Almanac. Glasgow: Neil Wilson Publishing Ltd. pp. 131–132. ISBN 978-1-897784-04-4.
- Wilson, Colin (1992). Serial Murderers. Malaysia: Marshall Cavendish. pp. 127–157. ISBN 978-1-854-35834-9.
