= David Croom-Johnson =

British barrister and judge

The Right Honourable Sir David Croom-Johnson DSC, VRD

Lord Justice of Appeal
- In office 12 November 1984 – 1 October 1989

Justice of the High Court
- In office 19 April 1971 – 12 November 1984

Personal details
- Born: David Powell Croom-Johnson; 28 November 1914 Cheam, Surrey
- Died: 21 November 2000 (aged 85)

Sir David Powell Croom-Johnson, DSC, VRD (28 November 1914 – 21 November 2000) was a British barrister and judge who served as a Lord Justice of Appeal from 1984 to 1989.

== Biography ==
Born in Cheam, Surrey, Croom-Johnson was the son of politician and High Court judge Sir Reginald Croom-Johnson. He was educated at The Hall School, Hampstead, Stowe School, and Trinity Hall, Cambridge, where he read English and law. He was called to the bar by Gray's Inn in 1938. Having joined the chambers of Montague Berryman KC at 12 King's Bench Walk, he practised common law on the Western Circuit.

Having joined the Royal Naval Volunteer Reserve in 1936, he served in the battleship HMS Barham, then in minesweepers for most of the Second World War. In 1940, abroad HMS Ross, he participated in Operation Dynamo, the evacuation of the British Expeditionary Force from Dunkirk. During the D-Day landings, Croom-Johnson commanded the minesweeper HMS Peterhead at Utah Beach. For his services in Normandy he received the Distinguished Service Cross.

Returning to the bar in 1946, Croom-Johnson was made a Queen's Counsel in 1958. He was Recorder of Winchester from 1962 to 1971 and a Judge of the Courts of Appeal of Jersey and Guernsey from 1966 to 1971.

In 1971, following in the steps of his father, Croom-Johnson was appointed a Justice of the High Court, assigned to the Queen's Bench Division and receiving the customary knighthood. He presided over several high-profile criminal trials. In 1977 he presided over the trial of the IRA leader Vincent Donnelly for carrying out the West Ham station attack. In 1982 he presided over the trial of the Soviet spy Hugh Hambleton. In 1983 he presided over the trials of the police officers who shot Stephen Waldorf, and the serial killer Dennis Nilsen. From 1978 to 1982 he chaired the Report of the Tribunal of Inquiry on the Crown Agents.

He was appointed a Lord Justice of Appeal in 1984 and was sworn of the Privy Council. He retired from the bench in 1989.

== Personal life ==
Croom-Johnson married Barbara Douglas Warren in 1940; they had one daughter.

== In popular culture ==
Croom-Johnson was portrayed by Ken Bones in Des, a 2020 docudrama focusing on Dennis Nilsen.
