= HM Prison Gartree =

Prison in Leicestershire, England

Coordinates: 52°29′46″N 0°57′39″W

HMP Gartree
- Interactive map of HMP Gartree
- Location: Market Harborough, Leicestershire
- Security class: Adult Male/Category B
- Population: 640 (August 2020)
- Opened: 1966
- Managed by: HM Prison Services
- Governor: Babafemi Dada
- Website: Gartree at justice.gov.uk

HM Prison Gartree is a Category B men's prison, located in Market Harborough, Leicestershire, England. Gartree is operated by His Majesty's Prison Service.

== History ==
Constructed on the western part of the site which was previously RAF Market Harborough, Gartree Prison opened in 1966 It was originally a Category C training centre, but its status was quickly upgraded to a maximum security prison.

The prison is infamous for a daring helicopter escape in 1987. The breakout remains the only one of its type to have been carried out in the United Kingdom. On 10 December 1987 at 3.15 pm, John Kendall and Sydney Draper were sprung from Gartree's exercise yard with the aid of a hijacked Bell 206 JetRanger helicopter. Kendall was a gangland boss serving eight years while Draper was serving a life sentence for murder. The escape caused great controversy at the time and led to a tightening of security at the jail. Kendall was recaptured 10 days later, but Draper remained on the run for another 13 months.

In 1992, Gartree was downgraded from a category A to a category B training prison. Since then the population of life sentenced prisoners at Gartree grew, and in 1997 the prison's role changed to that of a main life prisoner centre.

In a 2003 report the Board of Visitors criticised Gartree Prison for a serious shortage of staff, and budget cuts which were having a significant impact on services at the jail. The report noted that despite more than 30 proven allegations of racial discrimination between prisoners, there were not enough resources at the prison to release a member of staff to train as a race relations officer.

In June 2004 a scheme to support older prisoners was launched at Gartree Prison. This was in response to the fact that Gartree had one of the highest number of older prisoners in the country, holding 400 inmates aged over 50, with 17 aged over 60 and three in their 70s. The scheme which was backed by Age Concern was designed to work with older prisoners to promote access to their rights and discuss services within the prison.

== The prison today ==
Gartree Prison currently has Category B status, and many of its inmates are long-term prisoners serving life sentences. Most prisoners are employed in prison workshops or in the prison gardens, however there is a small learning department which provides education including offending behaviour programmes. 2013 X Factor winner Sam Bailey is a former Prison Officer at the prison. The Justice Secretary Shabana Mahmood announced in May 2025 that a site for an additional new prison had been identified near the existing prison.

== Notable former inmates ==
- Ian Brady - Committed the Moors murders with his partner Myra Hindley.
- Charles Bronson - often referred to in the British press as the "most violent prisoner in Britain" and "Britain's most notorious prisoner".
- Gerry Conlon - Member of the Guildford Four, wrongly convicted of being a Provisional IRA bomber.
- Reggie Kray - Gangster who, with his twin brother, ran the Firm gang.
- Tony Martin - a farmer who shot a burglar.
- Anthony Sawoniuk - Belarusian Nazi collaborator who was found guilty of war crimes.
- Fred West - serial killer who committed at least 12 murders.
- Professor Hugh Hambleton - academic, NATO specialist, intelligence officer (Canadian) and spy (KGB); sentenced to 10 years in 1982 for breaching the Official Secrets Act 1911 (as amended).
