= Colin Ireland =

British serial killer (1954–2012)

- Born: 16 March 1954; Dartford, Kent, England
- Died: 21 February 2012 (aged 57); HM Prison Wakefield, West Yorkshire, England
- Other name: Gay Slayer
- Conviction: Murder (5 counts)
- Penalty: 5 life sentences

Details
- Victims: 5
- Span of crimes: 8 March – 12 June 1993
- Country: United Kingdom
- Date apprehended: 21 July 1993

Colin Ireland (16 March 1954 – 21 February 2012) was a British serial killer known as the Gay Slayer, because his victims were gay men.

Ireland suffered a severely dysfunctional upbringing. He committed various crimes from the age of 16 and had served time in borstals and prisons. While living in Southend, he started frequenting the Coleherne, a gay pub in Earl's Court, London. Ireland sought men who liked the passive role and sado-masochism, so he could readily restrain them as they initially believed it was a sexual game. Criminologist David Wilson believes that Ireland was a psychopath. Forensic psychologist Anna Gekoski stated that her interactions with Ireland led her to believe that he was motivated by a desire for fame as a serial killer.

Ireland was heterosexual: he had been twice married to women. He pretended to be gay only to befriend potential victims and his murders were not sexually motivated. He was highly organised and carried a full kit of rope, handcuffs and a full change of clothes to each murder. After killing his victim he cleaned the flat of any forensic evidence linking him to the scene and stayed in the flat until morning in order to avoid arousing suspicion from leaving in the middle of the night.

Ireland was sentenced to five counts of life imprisonment for the murders on 20 December 1993 and remained imprisoned until his death on 21 February 2012, at the age of 57.

== Early life ==
Ireland was born in 1954 in Dartford, Kent, to an unmarried teenage couple; shortly after his birth, his father left him and his 17-year-old mother. His father is not named on his birth certificate, and Ireland did not know his identity. He was raised in poverty and moved home many times. When his mother married and became pregnant she put Ireland into care, although he was later returned to her. She went on to remarry in 1966.

During the 1960s in Sheerness, Kent, Ireland was propositioned on three occasions and spied on once by men who were paedophiles. At age 13, he left school. In his mid-teens, he was sent to borstal for theft, and whilst there, deliberately set fire to another resident's belongings. At age 17, Ireland was convicted of robbery. He escaped and was returned to borstal.

== Early adulthood ==
Ireland had a series of manual jobs, then in December 1975, he was convicted of car theft, criminal damage and two burglaries, for which he was sentenced to 18 months' imprisonment. Ireland was released in November 1976 and moved to Swindon, Wiltshire. He lived with a woman and her children for a few months. In 1977, he was convicted of extortion, for which he was sentenced to 18 months' imprisonment. In 1980, he was convicted of robbery, for which he was sentenced to two years' imprisonment. In 1981, he was convicted of attempted deception.

In 1982, Ireland married Virginia Zammit; the couple and their daughter lived in the Holloway area of London. In 1985, he was convicted and sentenced to six months for "going equipped to cheat". They divorced in 1987 after his wife discovered he had committed adultery. In 1989, in Devon, he married Janet Young; he was violent towards her and stole from her. In the early 1990s, they separated; she and her children became homeless. He moved to Southend-on-Sea, where he became homeless and lived in a hostel. He later moved to his own flat. Whilst living there, he travelled to the Coleherne Arms in Earl's Court, London, a gay pub which specialised in S&M, where he first met his victims.

== Victims ==
=== Peter Walker ===
On 8 March 1993, Peter Walker, a 45-year-old choreographer, took Ireland back to his flat in Battersea. There he was bound, and ultimately suffocated by a plastic bag being placed over his head. Ireland placed two teddy bears in a 69 position on the body. He left Walker's dogs locked in another room. The day after the murder, having heard no news reports of the crime, he called the Samaritans and a journalist from The Sun newspaper, advising them of the dogs, and that he had murdered their owner. He told them he wanted to become famous for being a serial killer. A former boyfriend of Walker was later interviewed and told the police that Walker did not enjoy sadomasochism and was most likely forced into it by Ireland.

=== Christopher Dunn ===
On 28 May 1993, Ireland murdered 37-year-old librarian Christopher Dunn, who lived in Wealdstone in Harrow. He was found naked in a harness. His death was initially believed to be an accident that occurred during an erotic game. In addition, because he lived in a different area from Walker, a different set of investigators worked on the case. For these reasons, the death was not initially linked to Walker's.

=== Perry Bradley III ===
On 4 June 1993, Ireland met 35-year-old businessman Perry Bradley III at the Coleherne pub. Bradley lived in Kensington and was the son of Texas Democratic Party fundraiser Perry Bradley Jr.

The two men returned to Bradley's flat, where Ireland suggested that he tie Bradley up; Bradley expressed his displeasure at the idea. In order to get Bradley to comply, Ireland told him that he was unable to perform sexually without elements of bondage. Bradley hesitantly cooperated and was soon trussed up on his own bed, face down, with a noose around his neck. After Ireland had secured Bradley, he demanded money and a PIN under the threat of torture. Ireland assured Bradley that he was merely a thief and would leave after stealing Bradley's money. After Bradley gave Ireland his PIN, which Ireland later used to steal £200, along with £100 in cash stolen from Bradley's flat, Ireland told him that he should go to sleep, as he wouldn't be leaving his flat for hours. Bradley eventually did fall asleep and Ireland momentarily thought of leaving Bradley unharmed. Ireland then realised that Bradley could identify him and used the noose, which he had earlier attached around Bradley's neck, to strangle him. Before leaving Bradley's flat, he placed a doll on top of the dead man's body.

=== Andrew Collier ===
Ireland, angered that he had received no publicity even after three murders, killed again within three days. On 7 June 1993, he met and courted 33-year-old Andrew Collier, a housing warden, and the pair went to Collier's home in Dalston. After entering the flat there was a disturbance outside and both men went to the window to investigate. Ireland gripped a horizontal metal bar that ran across the window. He later forgot to wipe the bar for fingerprints during his usual cleanup phase. The police found these prints.

Once he had tied up his victim on the bed, Ireland again demanded his victim's bank details. This time his victim refused to comply. After killing Collier's cat, Ireland strangled Collier with a noose. He put a condom on Collier's penis and placed the dead cat's mouth over it, and placed the cat's tail into Collier's mouth. Ireland was angered at discovering Collier was HIV positive while rummaging through his personal effects looking for bank details. He then phoned the police, asking why they had not linked the four murders. He left the next morning with £70.

A suspected reason for his killing of the cat was that after Ireland killed Walker and had left this previous victim's dogs locked in a separate room, he later called anonymously to advise parties to the fact that these dogs were being or had been locked up. As a result, the media called the killer an animal lover. He strangled the cat to demonstrate that the "animal lover" assumption had been wrong.

=== Emanuel Spiteri ===
Ireland's fifth victim was a Maltese chef named Emanuel Spiteri, aged 41, whom he had met at the Coleherne pub. Spiteri was persuaded to be cuffed and bound on his bed on the evening of 12 June 1993. Once more, Ireland demanded his PIN but did not obtain it. He again used a noose to kill. After carrying out his post-murder ritual of cleaning and clearing the scene, Ireland set fire to the flat and left, however the fire only caused minor damage. He rang the police later to tell them to look for a body at the scene of a fire and added that he would probably not kill again.

== Criminal case ==
=== Investigation ===
There are suggestions that homophobia on the part of the police delayed the linking of all the murders and that they were initially not handled well, but police eventually connected all five killings. The crimes were publicised by the mass media and it quickly became known in the gay community that a serial killer was specifically targeting gay men.

Investigations revealed that Spiteri had left the Coleherne pub and travelled home with his killer by train, and a security video successfully captured the two of them on the railway platform at Charing Cross station. Ireland recognised himself and decided to tell police he was the man with Spiteri but not the killer—he claimed to have left Spiteri in the flat with another man. However, police had also found fingerprints in Collier's flat, which they linked to Ireland.

=== Trial, convictions and imprisonment ===
Ireland was charged with the murders of Collier and Spiteri and confessed to the other three while awaiting trial in prison. He told police that he had no vendetta against gay men, but picked on them because they were the easiest targets. Ireland pretended to be gay in order to lure his victims. He had robbed those he killed because he was unemployed at the time, and he needed funds to travel to and from London when hunting for victims.

When his case came to the Old Bailey on 20 December 1993, Ireland admitted all charges and was given life sentences for each. The judge, Mr Justice Sachs, said he was "exceptionally frightening and dangerous", adding: "To take one human life is an outrage; to take five is carnage." On 6 December 1994, the Belfast Telegraph reported that Ireland had been questioned twice in Wakefield Prison relating to other unsolved murders of gay men, at which stage Ireland claimed that he would reveal the location of six further bodies, one per month. This does not seem to have occurred, though whether because Ireland was lying is uncertain.

On 22 December 2006, Ireland was one of 35 life sentence prisoners whose names appeared on the Home Office's list of prisoners who had been issued with whole life tariffs and were unlikely ever to be released.

Ireland's crimes received sensationalist coverage in the tabloid press. As well as the nickname "The Gay Slayer", and briefly "The Fairy Liquidiser" in Ireland and England, he was headlined as "Jack The Gripper" by the News of the World.

== Death ==
Ireland died on 21 February 2012, at Wakefield Prison. A spokeswoman for Her Majesty's Prison Service said: "He is presumed to have died from natural causes; a post-mortem will follow." Later, his death was ascribed to pulmonary fibrosis and a fractured hip he had suffered earlier in the month as preliminary causes of death.

== Media ==
- In 2001, Ireland's was one of several covered in the fifth episode of Infamous Murders titled "Crimes of Prejudice".
- In 2008, Real Crime covered his case in the third episode of series 7 "Serial Killer on Camera".
- In 2012, Ireland was the subject of the fifth episode of series 4 of Born to Kill?.
- In 2013, Ireland's case was covered in the sixth episode of series 4 of Crimes That Shook Britain.
- In 2016, Ireland's was one of three cases covered in the first episode of Encounters with Evil titled "Thrill Killers".
- In 2017, Colin Ireland's crimes were covered in an episode of the CBS Reality series Voice of a Serial Killer.
- In 2019, Ireland was the subject of episode 7, in series 3 of Most Evil Killers. on Sky UK-owned channel, Pick.

== See also ==
- List of serial killers in the United Kingdom
