= Allan Green (barrister) =

British lawyer

Sir Allan David Green, KCB, KC (born 1 March 1935) is a retired barrister in England and Wales. He was Director of Public Prosecutions and second head of the Crown Prosecution Service from 1987 to 1992.

== Career ==
Green was called to the bar in 1959 and rose to become a recorder (part-time judge) in 1979. Among his cases was the trial of the so-called 'Muswell Hill Murderer', serial killer Dennis Nilsen. After a successful career as a prosecution counsel, he was appointed Director of Public Prosecutions in 1987. In this role he was responsible for the majority of criminal prosecutions in England, and in his term of office he had to deal with the appeals against conviction of the Guildford Four and the Birmingham Six. Green resigned in October 1991, when he was spotted kerb-crawling in Kings Cross, London.

Green continued with his career, however, both prosecuting and defending in important cases, particularly murders. Between 2000 and 2004, he represented ten British soldiers in the inquiry into the 1972 Bloody Sunday massacre, when 27 people were shot, 14 fatally, by British troops in Northern Ireland. In answer to a question in Parliament in 2005, the Secretary of State for Northern Ireland said that Sir Allan had been paid £1.5 million for his work on the inquiry.

Green is a member of Inner Temple, and remained a practising barrister in London until his retirement in 2013.

== In popular culture ==
Green was portrayed by Jamie Parker in Des, a 2020 docudrama focusing on Dennis Nilsen.

Preceded by Sir Thomas Hetherington	Director of Public Prosecutions; 1987–1992	Succeeded by Barbara Mills
