= Ralph Sam Haeems =

Indian-born British criminal defence solicitor (1940–2005)

Ralph Sam Haeems (9 November 1940 – 31 March 2005) was a leading British criminal defence solicitor. He is credited with innovative defences in criminal cases, which, in some cases, created new legal precedents in UK appeals courts.

== Early years ==
Haeems was born in Bombay (now Mumbai) to a Bene Israel Jewish family. His parents were teachers. He attended Bombay University, earning his BSc degree in engineering. He came to England in 1962 to study for a master's degree in chemistry.

== London ==
He found a position as an office clerk in the East End, placing bets for his employers and collecting the winnings. He was promoted to supervising the defense of a murder suspect, whom he helped to acquit. Haeems then found employment with an offer of an articled clerkship. In 1972 he qualified as a solicitor and five years later set up his own practice.

== Notable cases ==
Haeems participated in the trials of George Ince, Dennis Nilsen, Russell Bishop and several defendants in the Brink's-Mat robbery.

== Death ==
Haeems suffered a heart attack in January 2005 and underwent triple bypass surgery two months later. He died, aged 64, from complications which set in during the following weeks.

== Family ==
He was survived by his wife Angela, whom he married in 1967, a son (a barrister) and two daughters (both solicitors).
