= Hugh Hambleton =

British-Canadian economist and spy (1922–1995)

- Born: 1922; Ottawa, Ontario, Canada
- Died: 1995 (aged 72–73)
- Occupation: economist
- Known for: spy for Soviet Union

Hugh George Hambleton (1922–1995) was a Canadian and British economist and a spy in the service of the Soviet Union.

== Biography ==
Hambleton was born in Canada to an English father and he held dual citizenship, Canadian and British. He studied in the United Kingdom and in Canada, including Lisgar Collegiate Institute, in Ottawa, and also spent part of his childhood in France, where his father was a press correspondent.

In 1944 and 1945, he was with the Free French Forces in Algiers and served as liaison agent with the United States Army. In 1945, he integrated the Intelligence Branch of the Canadian Army.

In 1952, he was recruited by a Soviet agent. In 1954, he studied economics at the Sorbonne. In 1956, he began working for the North Atlantic Treaty Organization, in Paris. He worked there for five years, during which he provided information to the Soviet Union. In 1961, he studied at the London School of Economics, where he obtained a doctorate. In 1964, he became professor of economics at Université Laval in Quebec City. He had some contacts with teachers at Laval among them, Henri Dorion, specialist of Soviet Union and with some elements of the Liberal Party.

In 1977, his Soviet supervisor, known under the pseudonym Rudolf ("Rudy") Herman, was arrested by the Federal Bureau of Investigation (FBI) in the United States. In 1978, Hermann became an informant of the FBI and revealed the identity of Soviet spies in America, including Hambleton. Information about Hambleton was also provided by defector Anatoliy Golitsyn. On November 5, 1979 Hambleton's home was searched and spying material was found. Hambleton was questioned multiple times over many years by the Royal Canadian Mounted Police, but he was not arrested. In the early 1980s, Canadian media made the Hambleton affair public. Members of Parliament asked questions about it in the Canadian House of Commons, but the Canadian government invoked the necessity of secrecy.

In June 1982 Hambleton was arrested in the United Kingdom, during a transit there. He was tried in the United Kingdom, under the [UK] Official Secrets Act. He pleaded guilty and, on December 7, 1982 he was sentenced by Mr Justice Croom-Johnson to ten years in prison. He spent jail time in Gartree Prison, in Market Harborough, Leicestershire. He was transferred to a prison in Canada in June 1986. He was released under surveillance in March 1989. He died in 1995.

== Bibliography ==
- Leo Heaps, Hugh Hambleton, Spy. Thirty Years with the KGB., Methuen, Toronto, 1983
- John Barron, "Professor Who Spied for the KGB", Reader's Digest (United Kingdom), April 1983, page 157
- J.L. Granatstein and David Stafford, Spy Wars: Espionage and Canada from Gouzenko to Glasnost, Key Porter, Toronto, 1990, 276 pages, ISBN 978-1550132588
