= Encounters with Evil =

- Genre: Documentary
- Country of origin: United Kingdom
- No. of seasons: 1
- No. of episodes: 10

Original release
- Network: Netflix
- Release: November 2016

Encounters with Evil is a ten-episode British documentary television series that was released by CBS Reality in the United Kingdom in November 2016 and later in Poland and Africa. The show was released on Netflix in the United States. The series follows infamous killers.

== Episodes ==
Episode 1 - Thrill Killers

- Focus: Dennis Nilsen, Ivan Milat, and Colin Ireland

Episode 2 - Psychopaths

- Focus: Joanna Dennehy, Peter Tobin, Ian Brady and Myra Hindley

Episode 3 - Imprisoners

- Focus: Wolfgang Přiklopil, Donald Neilson, Josef Fritzl, and Ariel Castro

Episode 4 - Prophets of Doom

- Focus: Jim Jones, Marshall Applewhite, and David Koresh

Episode 5 - Kidnap Killers

- Focus: Robert Black, Robert Thompson and Jon Venables, Bradley John Murdoch, Ian Huntley

Episode 6 - Family Killers

- Focus: Jeremy Bamber, Stuart Hazell, and Mitchell Quy

Episode 7 - Flesh Eaters

- Focus: Jeffrey Dahmer, Stephen Griffiths, and Armin Meiwes

Episode 8 - Spree Shooters

- Focus: Michael Ryan, Adam Lanza, Thomas Hamilton, Eric Harris and Dylan Klebold

Episode 9- Sex Slayers

- Focus: Fred West and Rosemary West, Steve Wright, and Peter Sutcliffe

Episode 10 - Murderous Medics

- Focus: Beverley Allitt, Josef Mengele, Myles Bradbury, and Harold Shipman
