= Murder of Lynsey Quy =

1998 murder in Southport, England

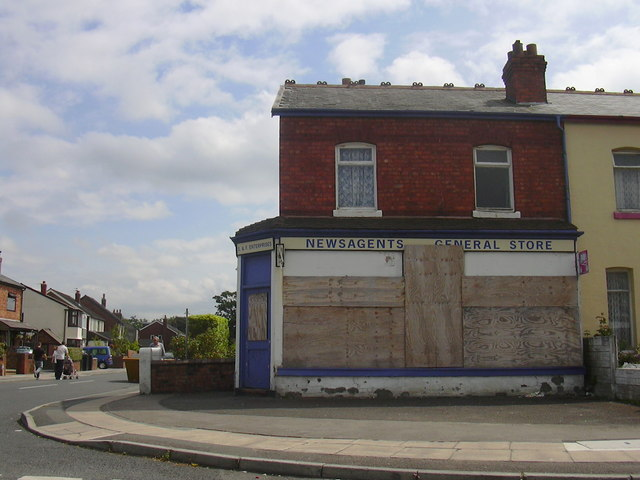
- Stamford Road, Birkdale, Southport
- Born: England
- Disappeared: 16 December 1998; Southport, Merseyside, England
- Status: Discovered on 8 June 2000
- Died: 15 December 1998– 5 February 1999; Birkdale, Southport, Merseyside, England
- Cause of death: Strangulation
- Body discovered: Southport Pleasureland
- Citizenship: British

Lynsey Quy (née Wilson) was a 21-year-old British woman from Southport, Merseyside, who was murdered on 16 December 1998 by her husband Mitchell Quy. Following her reported disappearance Mitchell Quy pleaded his innocence and was involved in what was a highly publicised missing persons case for 18 months. Her decapitated and dismembered body was discovered in 2000 on land by the old sea bathing lake. Mitchell Quy was convicted of the crime and sentenced to life imprisonment with a minimum of 17 years in prison.

== Background ==
Mitchell and Lynsey Quy lived in Southport with their son and her daughter from a previous relationship. They had married in August 1995 when she was 17 and heavily pregnant with another man's child. Mitchell Quy worked as a casino croupier and Lynsey was a barmaid. The relationship was plagued by domestic violence. She wrote in her diary about the turbulence of the marriage and how she wished for a divorce.

== Investigation ==
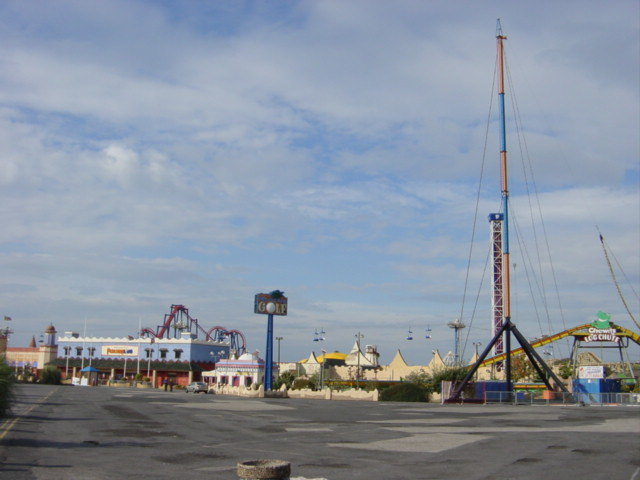
Southport Pleasureland where the body was discovered by police in June 2000

The reported disappearance of Lynsey Quy in December 1998 gained major media attention. It was alleged that she had walked out on her children over Christmas. The idea she had voluntarily left the family home on Stamford Road was disputed by her family. Her husband was involved in a public appeal in the search for his missing wife. Journalists had been invited into their home in the suburb of Birkdale. He claimed that his wife had voluntarily run off with another man. Police searched the family home and gardens but found nothing of use to the investigation. From the early days of the investigation police suspected she had been the victim of marital violence.

As the prime suspect, Mitchell Quy victimised himself. He appeared on many television and radio broadcasts appealing for his wife to return home. The family was offered support by Marie McCourt, the mother of Helen McCourt who disappeared in February 1988.

Mitchell Quy was suspected by his behaviour during the public appeals. When asked by a reporter "did you kill Lynsey?" he replied "I’m not going to answer that. I’m not going to answer that question because I don’t need to". In October 1999, he appeared on ITV's This Morning and was interviewed by Richard and Judy. His body language was analysed by experts.

In June 2000, body parts were discovered at Southport Pleasureland. On 8 June 2000, police searched sites near the theme park attractions. A torso buried in a shallow grave was identified as the missing woman.

She had been decapitated and dismembered by her husband, who had hidden body parts near a roller coaster. Her arms and legs were found a day later dumped in bushes next to a railway line, but her head and hands were never located. On 7 June, Mitchell Quy was arrested and he soon admitted his guilt.

== Trial ==
The trial began at North Sefton magistrates in June 2000. The court heard that Mitchell Quy had murdered his wife between 15 December 1998 and 5 February 1999 before hiding her severed body in different spots around Southport. She had been strangled to death prior to dismemberment while her children were asleep in another room. Then, Mitchell Quy cut up the body in the bathroom while his brother Elliot held open bin bags.

The defence argued manslaughter.

Mitchell Quy was sentenced to life imprisonment in January 2001. His brother, Elliot Quy, was jailed for seven years for helping dispose of the body. Their father, Michael Quy, was charged with conspiracy to pervert the course of justice.

== Aftermath ==
In 2001, Lynsey Quy's brother Peter Wilson committed suicide by hanging. Mitchell Quy's father, Michael Quy, died in 2013.

In 2017, Mitchell Quy's parole claim was rejected. In 2022, his third application for parole was rejected. His bullying behaviour and drug use in prison was reported. Quy had also completed intensive therapeutic and offending behaviour work. In January 2023, a parole hearing rejected his application for release, again due to his behavior. A petition was launched opposing his release.

Lynsey's father, Peter Wilson, publicly opposed Mitchell's release, saying that he "wouldn't feel comfortable knowing he is on the streets. If he gets out, somebody is going to get hurt".

== In popular culture ==
The case was covered on the crime programme Encounters with Evil. It was also covered by 'Faking It: Tears of a Crime' on Investigation Discovery.

== See also ==
- List of solved missing person cases: 1950–1999
