= Retroperitoneal bleeding =

- Other names: Retroperitoneal hematoma, retroperitoneal hemorrhage
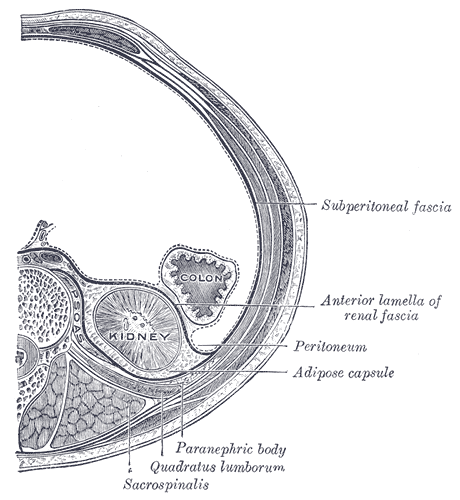
- Transverse section, showing the relations of the capsule of the kidney. (Peritoneum is labeled at center right. Retroperitoneal space is behind peritoneum.)
- Specialty: General surgery

Retroperitoneal bleeding is an accumulation of blood in the retroperitoneal space. Signs and symptoms may include abdominal or upper leg pain, hematuria, and shock. It can be caused by major trauma or by non-traumatic mechanisms.

== Signs and symptoms ==
Signs and symptoms may include:

- abdominal pain.
- upper leg pain.
- hematuria.
- shock.

== Causes ==
Retroperitoneal bleeds are most often caused by major trauma, such as from a traffic collisions or a fall. Less common non-traumatic causes including:

- anticoagulation.
- a ruptured aortic aneurysm.
- a ruptured renal aneurysm.
- acute pancreatitis.
- malignancy.

Retroperitoneal bleeds may also be iatrogenic, caused accidentally during medical procedures. Such procedures include cannulating the femoral artery for cardiac catheterization or for interventional radiology, and the administration of a psoas compartment nerve block.

== Diagnosis ==
=== Neurology ===
As well as initial symptoms, the accumulation of blood in the retroperitoneal space also compresses the femoral nerve. This may lead to weakness in extending the knee (with reduced patellar reflex) and weakness in flexing the hip.

=== Radiology ===
A magnetic resonance imaging (MRI) scan may be used to identify the collection of blood, although this is often not performed if bleeding is a medical emergency.

== Management ==
The management will depend on the location of the bleeding, the stability of the patient and the cause. Thus, the patient needs to be closely monitored and the etiology investigated. The initial management must include adequate fluid resuscitation. Treatment options for a retroperitoneal bleed may range from angiographic embolization to surgery in severe cases.
