= Brian Masters =

British writer (born 25 May 1939)

- Born: Brian J Masters; May 25, 1939 (age 87); London, UK
- Education: University College, Cardiff
- Partner: Juan Melian
- Writing career
- Years active: 1970–2008
- Genre: Biography

Brian Masters (born 25 May 1939) is a British writer, best known for his biographies of serial killers. He has also written books on French literature, the British aristocracy, and theatre, and has worked as a translator.

== Early life ==
Brian J Masters was born on 25 May 1939 in London to Mabel Masters (née Ingledew; 1916–1989) and Geoffrey Masters (1915–1982), a progress chaser in the aeronautical industry. Masters grew up in a prefabricated home on the Old Kent Road and was educated at Wilson's Grammar School.

Masters' mother had Kyphosis and a weak chest and in 1955 the family moved to Wales to improve her health. Masters remained in London to complete his A-levels. During his adolescence, he asked to interview television personality Gilbert Harding for the school magazine. Masters became close to him, and Harding functioned as a mentor with Masters serving as a companion and secretary. Masters was apparently quite unfazed when Harding asked to watch him bathe.

Masters read French Literature and Philosophy at University College, Cardiff where he gained a first in 1961. Briefly a teacher in France (as part of his degree), he worked for a time as a travel guide "organising educational tours for American students".

== Writing career ==
Early in his career, Masters wrote books on French writers such as Molière (1970) and Camus, among others, without any pretence at them having any real originality. The publisher Anthony Blond interested him in a book on the public's dreams about the Royal Family, which was the first of several books by Masters on the British aristocracy.

Masters is best known for his books about serial killers, written with the co-operation of the subjects or their families. He corresponded with Dennis Nilsen from shortly after his arrest in February 1983, and met him in prison without having "felt the slightest unease" during his conversations with Nilsen. His book contains writings by Nilsen, and Masters considers various theories which attempt to explain Nilsen's actions. Masters reaches no definite conclusion on "the essential unknowability of the human mind", but Nilsen is "not a stranger amongst us" rather "an extreme instance of human possibility". Masters, who is gay, feared that another author might get things wrong about the case given the climate for gay men at the time.

Masters was accused of being overly sympathetic to Nilsen at the time his book was first published in the UK, a view he rejects in his memoir. Michiko Kakutani, in a New York Times review after its 1993 United States publication, saw the book as "less a sensationalistic 'true crime' story than a chilling, psychological portrait of a murderer, a deeply disturbing voyage into the mind of a man who killed 15 times".

Following the book on Nilsen, Masters wrote The Shrine of Jeffrey Dahmer and She Must Have Known: The Trial of Rosemary West. At the time of the publication of the book on Dahmer, Masters told Charles Nevin writing for The Independent: "The contemplation of extraordinary human behaviour with vile effects reminds one of the fragility of human sanity . . . and I think studying these terrible crimes makes one more grateful for life as it is, and increases one's potential for pity, by which I mean one doesn't pity the murderer more than his victim: one pities all mankind."

== Selected bibliography ==
- Sartre: A Study (1970)
- A Student's Guide to Saint-Exupéry (1970)
- A Student's Guide to Rabelais (1971)
- Dreams About HM the Queen and Other Members of the Royal Family (1973)
- Wynyard Hall and the Londonderry Family (1973)
- Camus: A Study (1974)
- The Dukes: Origin, Ennoblement and History of 26 Families (1975; revised 2001)
- Now Barabbas Was a Rotter: the Extraordinary Life of Marie Corelli (1978)
- Georgiana (1981)
- Great Hostesses (1982)
- Killing for Company: The Case of Dennis Nilsen (1985)
- The Passion of John Aspinall (1988)
- Gary (1990)
- The Life of E. F. Benson (1991)
- The Shrine of Jeffrey Dahmer (1993, 2007)
- She Must Have Known: Trial of Rosemary West (1996)
- The Evil That Men Do (1996)
- Thunder in the Air: Great Actors in Great Roles (2000)
- Getting Personal (autobiography 2002)
