= List of Crown Court venues in England and Wales =

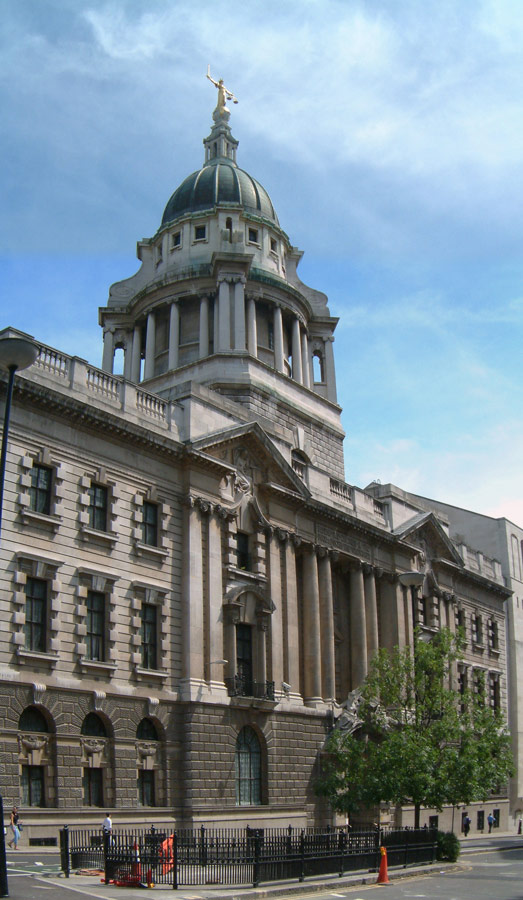
The Central Criminal Court, better known as the Old Bailey, is the Crown Court centre for the City of London.

In the system of courts of England and Wales, the Crown Court deals with serious criminal charges and with less serious charges where the accused has elected trial at the Crown Court instead of trial at a magistrates' court. The Crown Court also hears appeals against conviction and sentence from magistrates.

== Background ==
The Crown Court system was established by the Courts Act 1971, which came into force on 1 January 1972, following the recommendations of a royal commission chaired by Lord Beeching. Previously, criminal cases that were not dealt with by magistrates were heard by assize courts and courts of quarter sessions, in a system that had changed little in the preceding centuries. The Crown Court system is administered by His Majesty's Courts and Tribunals Service, an executive agency of the Ministry of Justice. England is divided into six regions by HMCTS (London, Midlands, North East, North West, South East and Western), with the whole of Wales forming a seventh region.

== Organisation ==
In 2007, there were 91 locations in England and Wales at which the Crown Court regularly sat. Crown Court centres are designated in one of three tiers: first-tier centres are visited by High Court judges for criminal and also for civil cases (in the District Registry of the High Court); second-tier centres are visited by High Court judges for criminal work only; and third-tier centres are not normally visited by High Court judges. High Court judges hear 2% of cases at the Crown Court, but 27% of the most serious (Class 1) cases. Circuit judges and recorders sit at all three tiers, hearing 88% and 10% of the cases respectively. When the Crown Court is conducting a trial, the judge sits with a jury of twelve; when hearing appeals against decisions of a magistrates' court, the judge sits with two (or sometimes four) magistrates.

== Place of business ==
Section 78 of the Supreme Court Act 1981 provides that the Crown Court can conduct business at any location in England and Wales, in accordance with directions given by the Lord Chancellor. This power is sometimes used to enable court sittings to take place away from one of the regular Crown Court venues. For example, in 2007, a sitting of the Crown Court was held at one of the oldest court buildings in England or Wales, the former courthouse in Beaumaris, Anglesey, which was built in 1614 and closed in 1997.

== Crown Court locations ==
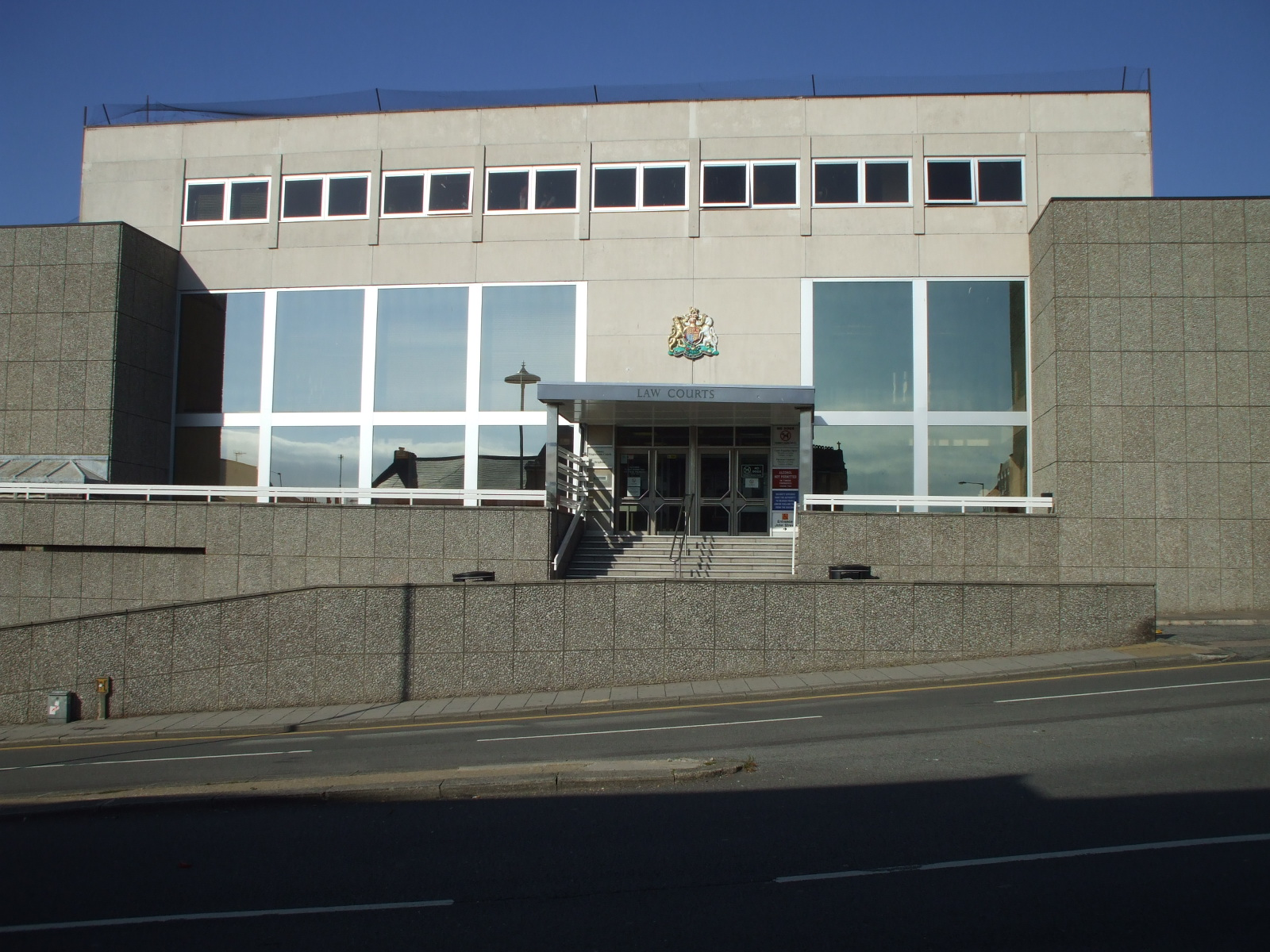
Brighton Law Courts

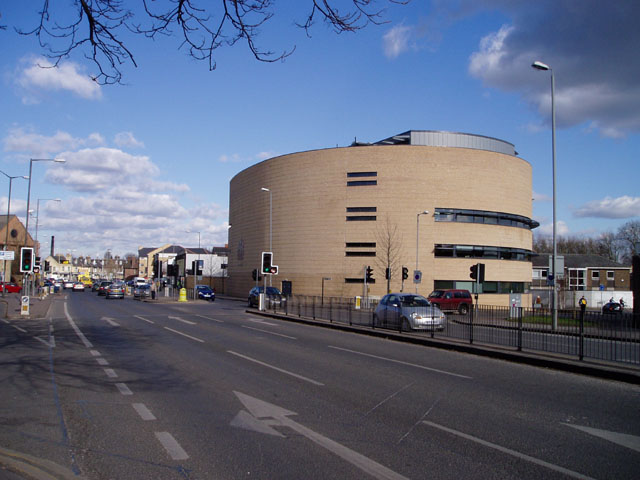
Cambridge Crown Court

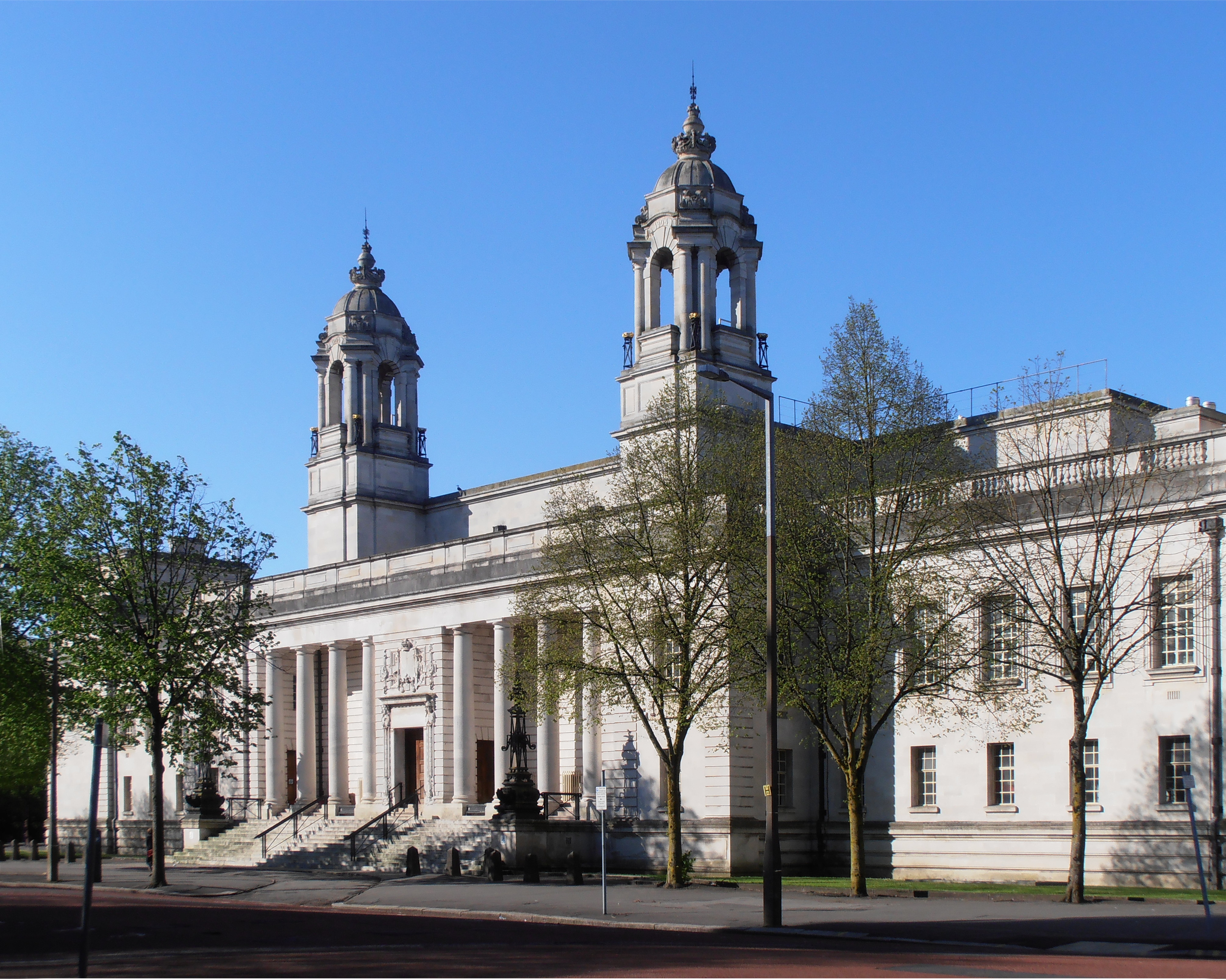
Cardiff Crown Court

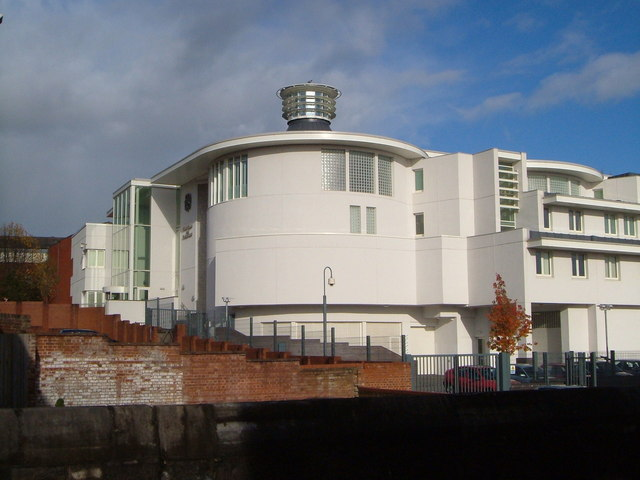
Exeter Law Courts

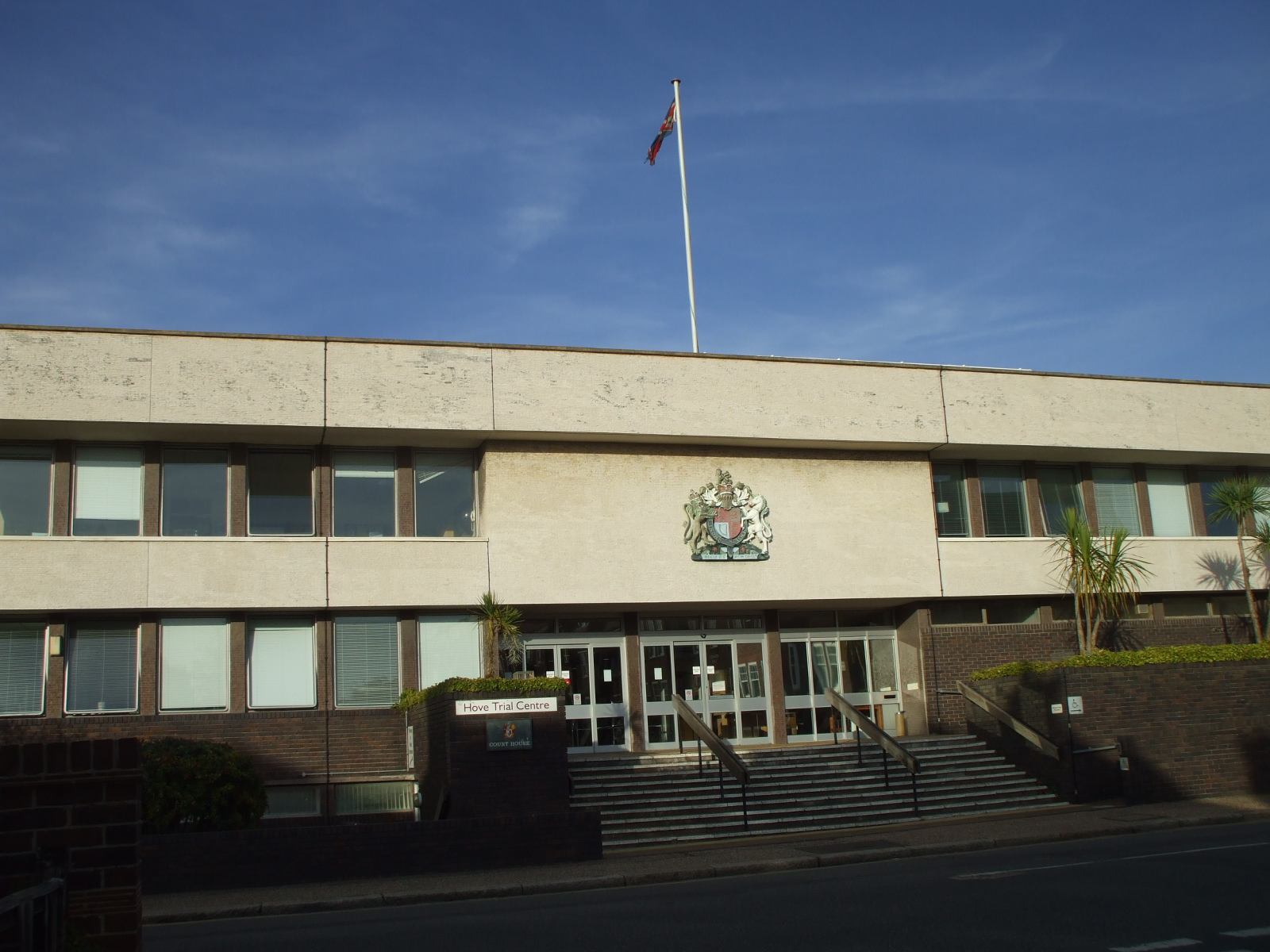
Hove Trial Centre

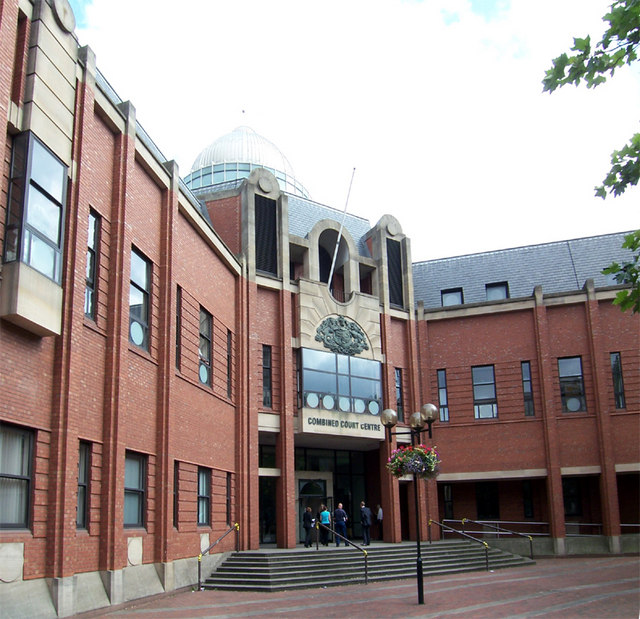
Kingston upon Hull Combined Court Centre

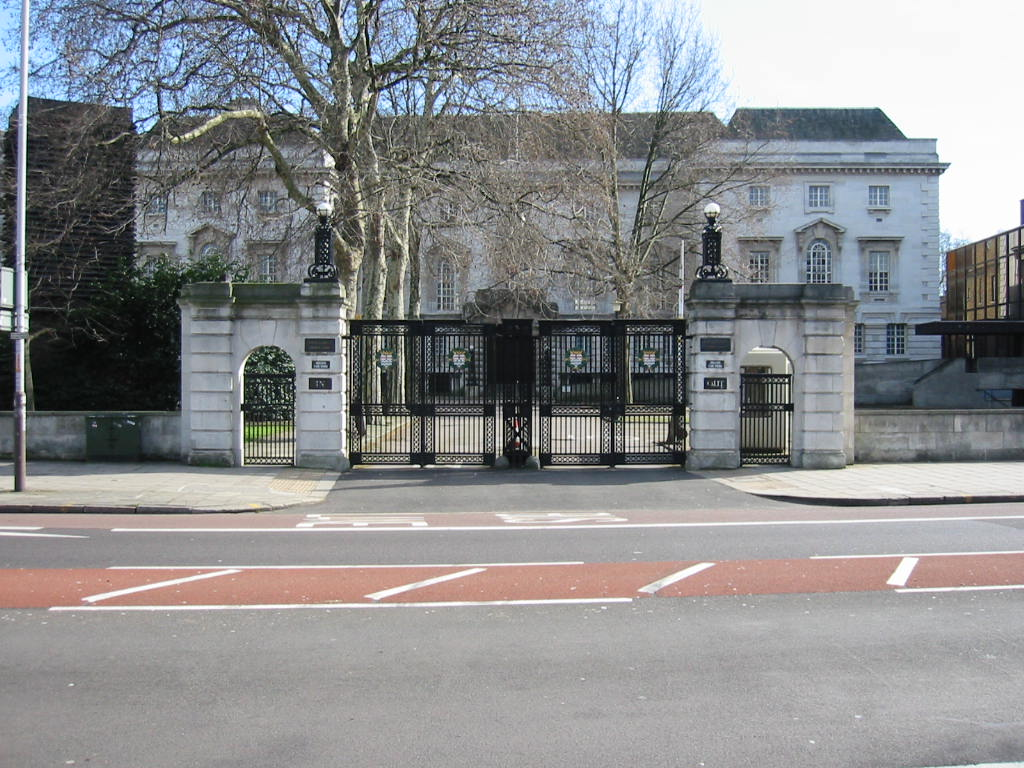
Inner London Crown Court

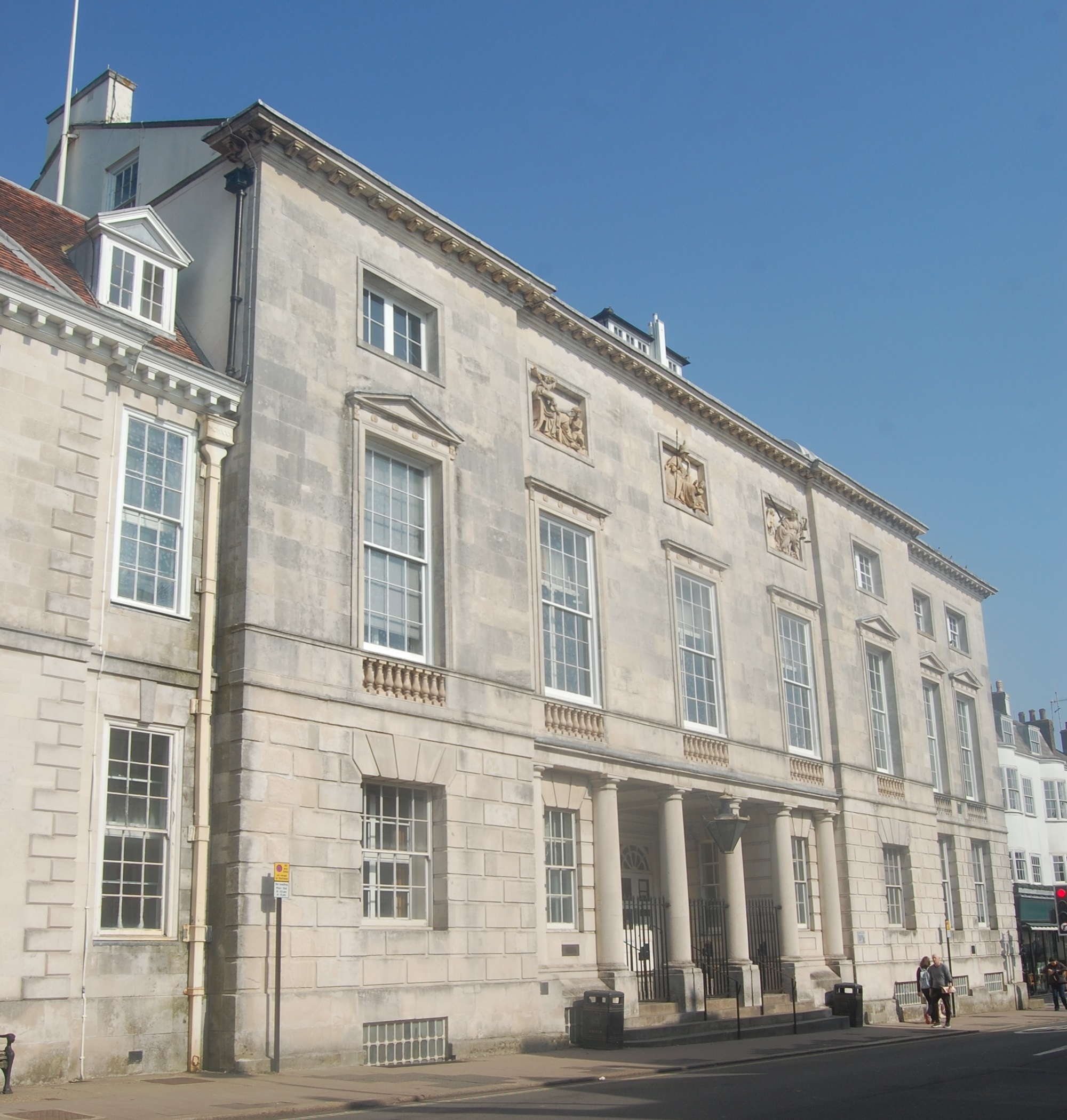
Lewes Crown Court

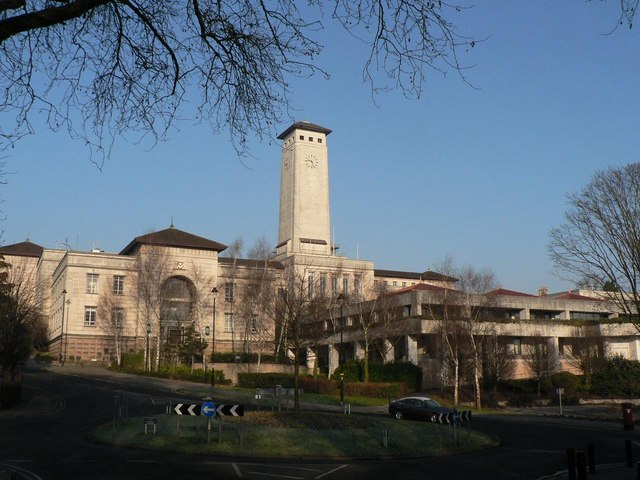
Newport Crown Court

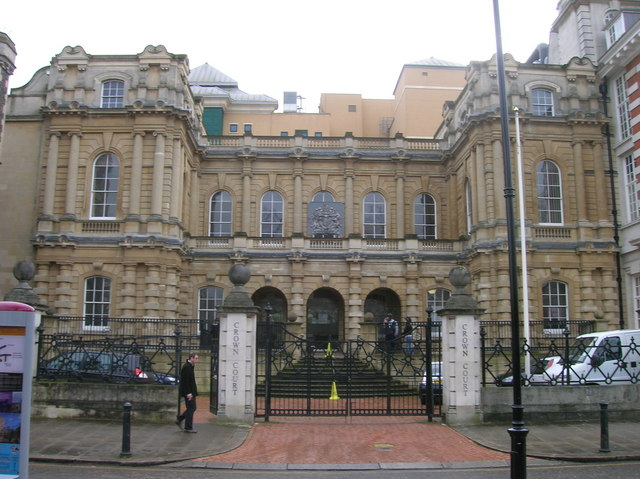
Reading Crown Court

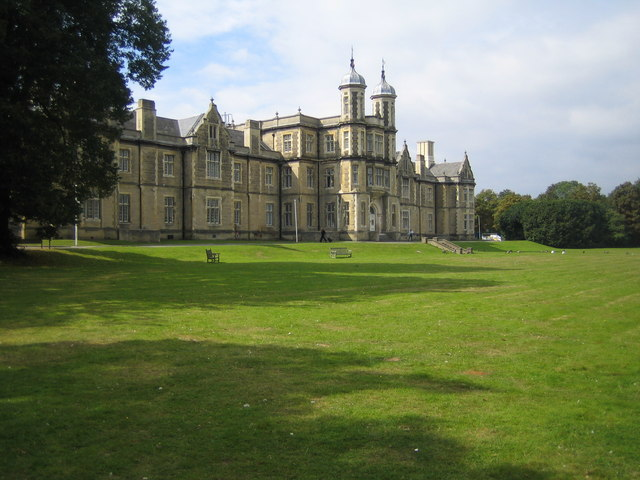
Snaresbrook Crown Court

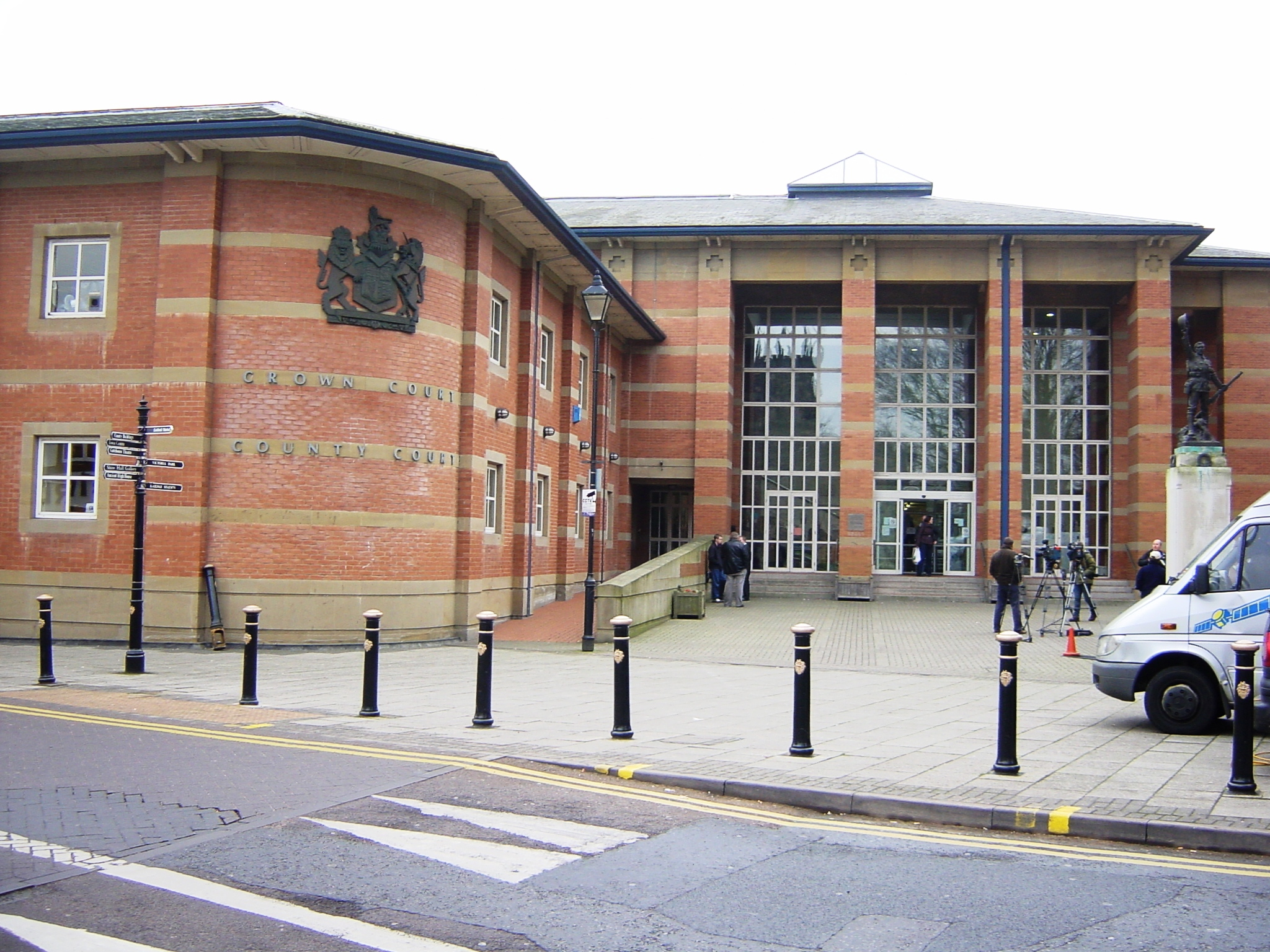
Stafford Combined Court Centre

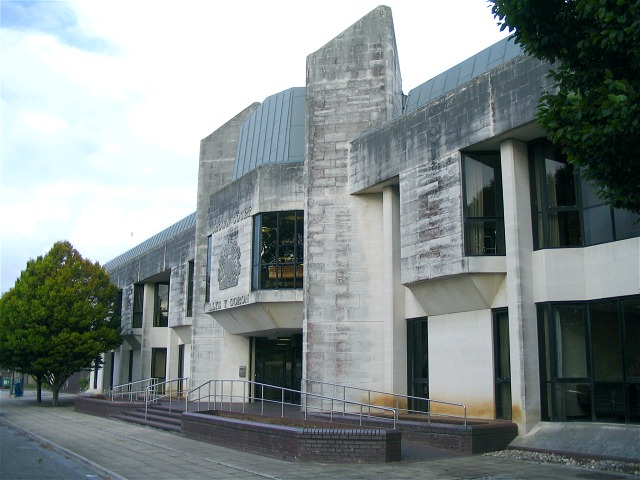
Swansea Crown Court

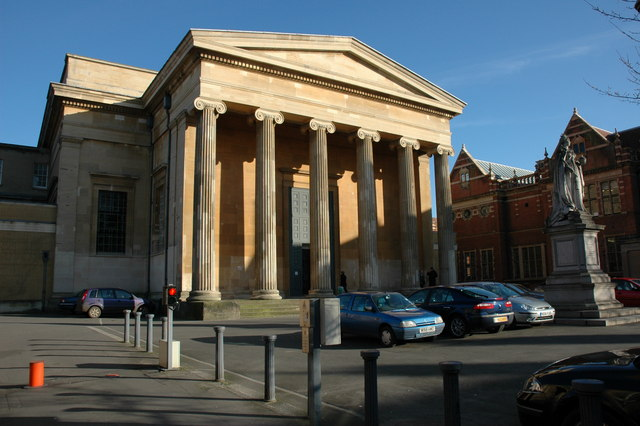
Worcester Crown Court

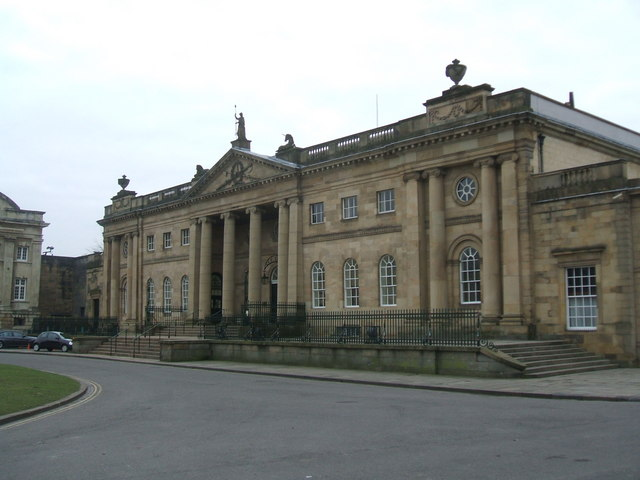
York Crown Court

Court name	Region	Tier	Notes	Ref
Amersham	South East	Third	Amersham Law Courts act as a satellite to Aylesbury Crown Court.	
Aylesbury (Aylesbury Crown Court)	South East	Third	March 2018 saw the relocation of the court house into the town's previous magistrates' court.	
Basildon	South East	Third	Shares a building with Basildon County Court; there are seven courtrooms for criminal cases.	
Birmingham (Queen Elizabeth II Law Courts, Birmingham)	Midland	First	Four of the sixteen courts are in a separate building.	
Bolton (Bolton Law Courts)	North West	Third	Shares a building with Bolton County Court	
Bournemouth (Bournemouth Combined Court Centre)	Western	Second	Shares a building with Bournemouth County Court	
Bradford (Bradford Law Courts)	North East	Second	Shares a building with Bradford County Court	
Brighton (Brighton Law Courts)	South East	Third	There are two court rooms dedicated to hosting Crown Court cases within the magistrates' court	
Bristol (Bristol Crown Court)	Western	First	Takes long trials from other courts in the region	
Burnley (Burnley Law Courts)	North West	Third	Shares a building with Burnley County Court	
Caernarfon (Caernarfon Criminal Justice Centre)	Wales	First	A new court building opened on 20 May 2009, the new building contains two Crown Court courtrooms and two magistrates' court courtrooms; the listed building formerly holding the court was put on sale for £120,000 in 2008.	
Cambridge (Cambridge Crown Court)	South East	First	Upgraded to first tier status in 2005 after a new court building opened in 2004	
Canterbury (Canterbury Law Courts)	South East	Third	Shares a building with Canterbury County Court	
Cardiff (Cardiff Crown Court)	Wales	First	Administers Newport Crown Court	
Carlisle (Carlisle Courts of Justice)	North West	First	Shares a building with Carlisle County Court	
Central Criminal Court	London	Second	Known as the "Old Bailey", after the street on which the court is located	
Chelmsford (Chelmsford Crown Court)	South East	First		
Chester (Chester Crown Court)	North West	First	Administers the crown courts at Knutsford and Warrington	
Coventry (Coventry Combined Court Centre)	Midland	Third	Shares a building with Coventry County Court	
Croydon (Croydon Law Courts)	London	Third	Shares a building with Croydon County Court	
Derby (Derby Combined Court Centre)	Midland	Third	Shares a building with Derby County Court	
Doncaster	North East	Third	Designated as a suitable venue for terrorism-related trials, following improvements to the building in 2007	
Dorchester (County Hall, Dorchester)	Western	Second	The court has one courtroom; the court offices are in Weymouth	
Durham (Durham Crown Court)	North East	Third	The court has two courtrooms	
Exeter (Exeter Law Courts)	Western	First	Shares a building with Exeter County Court	
Gloucester (Gloucester Crown Court)	Western	Second		
Grimsby (Grimsby Combined Court Centre)	North East	Third	Shares a building with Great Grimsby County Court	
Guildford (Guildford Crown Court)	South East	Third	The court also uses a courtroom at Guildford Magistrates' Court for two weeks each month.	
Harrow (Harrow Crown Court)	London	Third		
Hereford (Hereford Crown Court)	Midland	Third	A satellite of Worcester Crown Court	
Hove (Hove Trial Centre)	South East	Third		
Inner London (Inner London Crown Court)	London	Third		
Ipswich (Ipswich Crown Court)	South East	Second		
Isleworth (Isleworth Crown Court)	London	Third		
King's Lynn (King's Lynn Crown Court)	South East	Third		
Kingston upon Hull (Kingston upon Hull Combined Court Centre)	North East	Third	Shares a building with Kingston upon Hull County Court	
Kingston upon Thames (Kingston upon Thames Crown Court)	London	Third	The court has been designated to hear terrorism trials as a backup if Woolwich Crown Court is unable to hear a particular trial.	
Lancaster (Lancaster Crown Court)	North West	Third	A satellite of Preston Crown Court, which sits at Lancaster Castle	
Leeds (Leeds Combined Court Centre)	North East	First	Shares a building with Leeds County Court	
Leicester (Leicester Law Courts)	Midland	Second	Shares a building with Leicester County Court	
Lewes (Lewes Crown Court)	South East	First	Shares a building with Lewes County Court; the court has ten courtrooms, split between Lewes, Hove and Brighton.	
Lincoln (Lincoln Crown Court)	Midland	First	The court is based in Lincoln Castle	
Liverpool (Queen Elizabeth II Law Courts, Liverpool)	North West	First	Shares a building with Liverpool Youth Court	
Luton (Luton Crown Court)	South East	Second		
Maidstone (Maidstone Law Courts)	South East	Second	Shares a building with Maidstone County Court	
Manchester (Manchester Crown Court (Crown Square))	North West	First		
Manchester (Minshull Street Crown Court)	North West	Third	There are ten courtrooms in the main building, with a further two at Stockport Magistrates' Court.	
Merthyr Tydfil (Merthyr Tydfil Law Courts)	Wales	Second	Shares a building with Merthyr Tydfil County Court and Merthyr Tydfil Magistrates' Court	
Mold (Mold Law Courts)	Wales	First	Shares a building with Mold County Court; extension plans have been put forward	
Newcastle upon Tyne (Newcastle Law Courts)	North East	First	Shares a building with Newcastle upon Tyne County Court	
Newport (Isle of Wight) (Newport Law Courts)	Western	Third	Shares a building with Newport (Isle of Wight) County Court and the Isle of Wight Magistrates' Court	
Newport (South Wales) (Newport Crown Court)	Wales	Second	The three courtrooms are administered from Cardiff Crown Court	
Northampton (Northampton Crown Court)	Midland	Second	Shares a building with Northampton County Court	
Norwich (Norwich Law Courts)	South East	First	Shares a building with Norwich County Court	
Nottingham (Nottingham Crown Court)	Midland	First	Shares a building with Nottingham County Court	
Oxford (Oxford Combined Court Centre)	South East	First	Shares a building with Oxford County Court	
Peterborough (Peterborough Combined Court Centre)	South East	Third	Shares a building with Peterborough County Court	
Plymouth (Plymouth Law Courts)	Western	Second	Shares a building with Plymouth County Court	
Portsmouth (Portsmouth Courts of Justice)	Western	Third	Shares a building with Portsmouth County Court	
Preston (Preston Crown Court)	North West	First	Shares a building with Preston County Court; administers the satellite crown courts at Barrow-in-Furness and Lancaster	
Reading (Reading Crown Court)	South East	Second	The court has six courtrooms, but pressure of work means that some cases are moved to Oxford Crown Court for hearing.	
Salisbury (Salisbury Law Courts)	Western	Third	Shares a building with Salisbury County Court	
Sheffield (Sheffield Law Courts)	North East	First	Shares a building with Sheffield County Court	
Shrewsbury (Shrewsbury Justice Centre)	Midland	Second	The court has three courtrooms, now hosted in the town's former magistrates’ court, which has been completely refurbished since its closure in 2016.	
Snaresbrook (Snaresbrook Crown Court)	London	Third	Snaresbrook is the largest crown court centre in England.	
Southampton (Southampton Courts of Justice)	Western	Third	Shares a building with Southampton County Court	
Southend (Southend Court House)	South East	Third	Shares a building with Southend Magistrates' Court	
Southwark (Southwark Crown Court)	London	Third	The court is the designated crown court in London for all fraud or money laundering cases estimated to last 6 weeks or more.	
St Albans (St Albans Crown Court)	South East	Second	The court has six courtrooms (two of which are housed in the adjacent Magistrates’ Court) and has had to hold additional hearings at Cheshunt Magistrates' Court and Watford County Court because of pressures of work.	
Stafford (Stafford Combined Court Centre)	Midland	First	Shares a building with Stafford County Court	
Stoke-on-Trent (Stoke-on-Trent Combined Court Centre)	Midland	Third	Shares a building with Stoke-on-Trent County Court	
Swansea (Swansea Crown Court)	Wales	First	Also administers the crown courts at Carmarthen and Haverfordwest	
Swindon (Swindon Law Courts)	Western	Third	Shares a building with Swindon County Court	
Taunton (Taunton Crown Court)	Western	Third	Shares a building with Taunton County Court	
Teesside (Teesside Combined Court Centre)	North East	First	Shares a building with Middlesbrough County Court	
Truro (Truro Crown Court)	Western	First	Shares a building with Truro County Court	
Warrington	North West	Second	Administered from Chester Crown Court	
Warwick (Warwickshire Justice Centre)	Midland	First	Shares a building with Warwick County Court	
Winchester (Winchester Law Courts)	Western	First	Shares a building with Winchester County Court	
Wolverhampton (Wolverhampton Combined Court Centre)	Midland	Third	Shares a building with Wolverhampton County Court	
Wood Green (Wood Green Crown Court)	London	Third		
Woolwich (Woolwich Crown Court)	London	Third		
Worcester (Worcester Crown Court)	Midland	Second	Shares a building with Worcester County Court; administers a satellite crown court at Hereford	
York (York Crown Court)	North East	Second	A two-court centre, taking work from a large part of North Yorkshire	

== See also ==
- List of courts in England and Wales
- List of County Court venues in England and Wales
