= List of honorary recorders =

This is a list of the current titular and honorary recorders in the Courts of England and Wales, together with the Crown Court venue at which they sit.

The title of honorary recorder is awarded by a borough council to a judge who sits at the Crown Court within or associated with their area. It is intended to mark the link between the administration and judiciary. Conventionally the title is bestowed upon the resident judge, who is appointed by the Lord Chief Justice to be the most senior circuit judge sitting at that Crown Court.

== Titular recorders ==
- Recorder of Liverpool (Judge Andrew Menary KC) (Liverpool) (honorary since 1971)
- Recorder of London (Judge Mark Lucraft KC) (Central Criminal Court)
- Recorder of Manchester (Judge Nicholas Dean KC) (Manchester) (honorary since 1971)

== Honorary recorders ==
- Recorder of Aylesbury (Judge Francis Sheridan) (Aylesbury)
- Recorder of Birmingham (Judge Andrew Smith KC) (Birmingham)
- Recorder of Bolton (Judge Walsh) (Bolton)
- Recorder of Bradford (Judge Jonathan Rose) (Bradford)
- Recorder of Brighton and Hove (Judge Christine Laing KC) (Lewes)
- Recorder of Bristol (Judge Peter Blair, KC) (Bristol)
- Recorder of Cambridge (Judge Mark Bishop) (Cambridge)
- Recorder of Canterbury (Judge Simon James) (Canterbury)
- Recorder of Caernarfon (Judge Rhys Price Rowlands) (Caernarfon)
- Recorder of Cardiff (Judge Tracey Lloyd-Clarke) (Cardiff)
- Recorder of Carlisle (Judge Peter Davies) (Carlisle)
- Recorder of Chelmsford (Judge Gratwicke) (Chelmsford)
- Recorder of Chester (Judge Steven Everett, DL) (Chester)
- Recorder of Coventry (Judge Lockhart KC) (Leamington Spa)
- Recorder of Croydon (Judge Alice Robinson) (Croydon)
- Recorder of Derby (Judge Shaun Smith KC) (Derby)
- Recorder of Durham (Judge Christopher Prince) (Durham)
- Recorder of Exeter (Judge James Patrick) (Exeter)
- Recorder of Guildford (Judge Patricia Lees) (Guildford)
- Recorder of Gloucester (Judge Ian Lawrie KC) (Gloucester)
- Recorder of Greenwich (Judge Christopher Kinch KC) (Woolwich)
- Recorder of Haringey (Judge John Dodd KC) (Wood Green)
- Recorder of Hull and the East Riding (Judge Paul Watson KC) (Kingston upon Hull)
- Recorder of Ipswich (Judge Martyn Levett) (Ipswich)
- Recorder of the Royal Borough of Kensington and Chelsea (Judge Edmunds KC) (Isleworth)
- Recorder of Leeds (Judge Guy Kearl, KC) (Leeds)
- Recorder of Lincoln (Judge John Pini, KC) (Lincoln)
- Recorder of Luton (Judge Michael Simon) (Luton)
- Recorder of Maidstone (Judge Julian Smith) (Maidstone)
- Recorder of Merthyr Tydfil (Judge Richard Twomlow) (Merthyr Tydfil)
- Recorder of Middlesbrough (Judge Simon Bourne-Arton, KC) (Teesside)
- Recorder of Milton Keynes (Judge Antony Hughes) (Milton Keynes)
- Recorder of Newcastle (Judge Paul Sloan, KC) (Newcastle)
- Recorder of Norwich (Judge Stephen Holt) (Norwich)
- Recorder of Nottingham (Judge Nirmal Shant, KC) (Nottingham)
- Recorder of Oxford (Judge Ian Pringle ) (Oxford)
- Recorder of Portsmouth (Judge Richard Price) (Portsmouth)
- Recorder of Preston (Judge Robert Altham) (Preston)
- Recorder of Redbridge (Her Honour Judge Rosa Dean) (Snaresbrook)
- Recorder of Richmond-upon-Thames (Judge Peter Lodder KC) (Kingston upon Thames)
- Recorder of Salisbury (Judge Andrew Barnett) (Salisbury)
- Recorder of Sheffield (Judge Jeremy Richardson, KC) (Sheffield)
- Recorder of Southwark (Judge Michael Evans KC*) (Inner London Crown Court)
- Recorder of St Albans (Judge Lana Wood) (St Albans Crown Court)
- Recorder of Stafford (Judge Kristina Montgomery, KC) (Stafford)
- Recorder of Stoke on Trent (Judge Paul Glenn) (Stoke-on-Trent)
- Recorder of Swansea (Judge Paul Thomas KC) (Swansea)
- Recorder of Truro (Judge Simon Carr) (Truro).
- Recorder of Westminster (Judge Tony Baumgartner) (Southwark Crown Court)
- Recorder of Winchester (Judge Angela Morris) (Winchester)
- Recorder of Wolverhampton (Judge James Burbidge KC) (Wolverhampton)
- Recorder of Worcester (Judge James Burbidge KC) (Worcester)
- Recorder of York (Judge Sean Morris) (York)
