= Trial of Micheal Ward =

2026 Crown Court case of actor Micheal Ward

R v Micheal Ward
- Court: Snaresbrook Crown Court
- Full case name: THE KING v MICHEAL WARD (01KF1023823)
- Started: 29 June 2026
- Decided: 10 July 2026
- Verdict: Micheal Ward; Not guilty on all five counts (unanimous verdict).
- Charge: Micheal Ward rape (2 counts) assault by penetration (2 counts) sexual assault (1 count)

Court membership
- Judge sitting: Her Honour Judge Rosa Dean

In January 2023 Micheal Ward, a BAFTA award-winning British actor and model known for his acting role as Jamie Tovell in the critically acclaimed British television series Top Boy, was arrested and later charged in 2025 by the Crown Prosecution Service with two counts of rape and three counts of sexual assault, relating to allegations made in January 2023. At trial, the jury in July 2026 unanimously found him not guilty on all five counts.

== 2023 allegations, arrest, and 2025 charges ==
On 25 July 2025, the Metropolitan Police announced that the Crown Prosecution Service had authorised charges against Ward following allegations initially made in January 2023. He was charged with two counts of rape, two counts of sexual assault by penetration and one count of sexual assault. The offences were alleged to have been committed in January 2023 against one woman.

Ward was arrested on 18 January 2023 on arrival at an airport as he returned from work commitments in Italy.

Later, Ward told the court “I knew that I had not done anything wrong and wanted to get [to] the bottom of it.” In his initial prepared statement to the police, he stated “I deny the allegation of rape. I want to put on record that we had consensual foreplay and consensual sex.”

== First appearance and plea ==
Ward first appeared at Thames Magistrates’ Court on 28 August 2025, and entered no plea. He was granted conditional bail, with a condition that he not contact the complainant, and the case was sent to Snaresbrook Crown Court. He subsequently pleaded not guilty to all five counts.

== 2026 Crown Court Trial ==
=== Legal representation ===
The case was prosecuted by the Crown Prosecution Service, they were represented by barrister Tracy Ayling KC of 2BR.

Ward was represented by barrister Sallie Bennett-Jenkins KC of 2 Hare Court, and solicitor Humzah Ilyas of Hickman & Rose.

=== Opening of the case ===
The trial began on Monday 29 June 2026 at Snaresbrook Crown Court and was opened by Tracy Ayling KC.

The prosecution alleged that Ward sexually assaulted and raped the woman in the back of a Mercedes.

=== Background ===
Ward hosted an all-white New Year party at the Infinity Lounge nightclub in Gants Hill, East London, on 1 January 2023, an event attended by approximately 250 people.

The court heard that the complainant had attended the event with a group of two other friends. Before attending the event, the complainant had searched for Ward on Google and sent photographs of him to a friend. During her witness testimony, she told the jury that she knew he had appeared in multiple television programmes and films.

Ward first met the complainant on 1 January 2023 while she was with friends at the all-white party. He said that he found her “very cute” and confident, and recalled a “quite flirty” conversation; he asked for her Snapchat. Ward told the jury: “I could tell there was interest there – from her eye contact and the way she was speaking”, and said that he got a “great vibe” from their conversation. At trial, the complainant accepted that she was flattered when Ward asked for her Snapchat details.

In court, the complainant told jurors: “I won’t deny that I did find him attractive”. She described the conversations they had after meeting at the nightclub, stating “I can’t remember exact comments, maybe some comments were flirty” and “He was more flirty than I was in those conversations”.

People began leaving the event at approximately 2:20 a.m. on 2 January 2023. Jurors heard that, as the party ended, Ward unexpectedly received a message from the complainant saying that she was waiting by a car. The complainant then accompanied Ward to the back of his friend’s Mercedes.

=== First car encounter ===
None of the five charges in this case stemmed from what took place in the first car.

While in the back of Ward’s friend’s Mercedes, Ward and the complainant kissed on the lips and hugged. During the opening speech of the Crown’s case, the prosecutor Tracy Ayling KC told jurors that in the first car, the complainant consented to Ward touching her sexually; namely, she consented to him touching her vagina. It was noted by the prosecutor, in her closing speech, that the complainant “does not deny that what happened in the first car was consensual”.

Ward then invited the complainant and her two friends to an afterparty, which they agreed to attend.

=== Afterparty ===
After leaving the location of the all-white event in Gants Hill, Ward and the complainant travelled separately to the afterparty, which was being hosted in Stratford.

In court, the complainant said she and her friends attended the afterparty “to use the toilet”. Jurors were told that the complainant got a “weird vibe” at the party, that it was attended mostly by men, and that she and her friends left shortly afterwards. Once outside, Ward allegedly asked where she was going and suggested that she walk with him to a car parked further up the road so he could talk to her. The complainant told jurors that she was told to walk behind Ward and not speak to anyone on the way.

=== Second car encounter ===
The five charges in this case all stemmed from allegations that what took place in the second car encounter was not consensual.

Ward was alleged to have got into the driver’s seat, the complainant into the passenger seat, kissed her, and invited her into the back seat of the car. The jury heard that she squeezed through the gap between the seats to join Ward in the back. The complainant told the court that she did kiss him in the car but felt pressured, stating “I have never denied kissing Micheal. I am just saying that I felt pressured”.

In cross-examining, the prosecutor, Tracy Ayling KC, said to Ward "you were bent on getting what you wanted" she added, "You were bent that night on having sex with her come what may". Ward stated "That definitely was not the case. I have no interest in being with someone who does not want to be with me".

Ward’s barrister, Sallie Bennett-Jenkins KC, told the woman “The reality is that this was a completely consensual event with somebody you found attractive, charming and was relatively famous”. The complainant said that she had not used the word “no”.

Ward told the court that the car door was unlocked and that she gave no indication that she wanted to leave, stating "I really feel that she wanted to be there. She never mentioned anything about wanting to leave." and "Everything was progressing in a natural, hot way, and we were just enjoying it."

After this alleged encounter, the complainant had messaged Ward - telling him to “enjoy the rest of his evening”. At trial, she stated that she exchanged friendly messages with Ward following the incident due to her having “not fully come to terms with what had actually happened to her”.

Ward maintained throughout the proceedings that the sexual encounter had been consensual. The complainant had looked Ward up on Google and sent the photographs of him to her friend, prior to going to the party, the court heard. He told the jury that there had been mutual attraction and that the complainant had actively and willingly participated.

Ms Bennett-Jenkins KC told the Jury “There are three, at the very least, significant areas where the woman can be demonstrated not to have told the truth.” adding “Is that a witness upon [whom] you can rely? I suggest not.”

=== Forensic examination of the clothing ===
The complainant alleged that, after the encounter, she believed there was blood on her leggings and underwear. However, at trial, it was established that the police forensic examination of all the relevant clothing found no trace of blood.

=== Digital forensic examination and deleted messages ===
The court heard the complainant had hidden phone messages from the police that she had exchanged with Ward when making the initial set of allegations that led to his 18 January 2023 arrest. The initially undisclosed messages showed that the complainant had replied multiple times to Ward after the encounter. When asked about the decision to conceal these messages, the woman said “I don’t know why” and “I just didn’t really feel like I had an explanation as to why I replied”.

The court heard that it was not until 18 months after her original police interview, over 17 months after Ward’s arrest, that the complainant finally disclosed having deleted parts of her messages with Ward. This disclosure came to light only after the police investigators made enquiries to her friends in which they sought screenshots of chat conversations.

After the alleged encounter, the two continued exchanging messages. A message where the complainant told Ward to “enjoy the rest of his evening” after the alleged encounters was among the omitted messages. Ward told the jurors that, at the time, he had wanted to see her again but that his busy schedule took over and contact eventually fizzled out.

=== Disruption of proceedings ===
On 3 July 2026 HHJ Rosa Dean the Recorder of Redbridge, the judge presiding over the trial, confronted the online influencer Murad Merali over his conduct in the court.

Merali is a YouTuber and TikTok content creator with, at the time, over half a million followers across platforms, and had earlier posted videos commenting on evidence whilst the case was still being heard. His videos had openly discussed the complainant’s cross-examination whilst the trial was still live and expressed views about the complainant’s credibility. Merali had filmed the videos within the grounds of Snaresbrook Crown Court, and had even approached individuals attending court in support of Ward, including members of Ward’s family.

HHJ Dean ordered Merali to leave the building; the public gallery was cleared for parts of the trial while checks were made to ensure jurors had not seen the material that Merali had posted, and Dean said that she was “absolutely determined to make sure that nothing disrupts this trial”.

The Attorney General was alerted of the situation to consider whether the posts amounted to contempt of court. It was later reported that the Attorney General's Office was not believed to be taking any further action.

=== Support ===
Ward was supported throughout the trial by family and friends. The public gallery was packed with them on every day of the proceedings.

Top Boy co-star Jasmine Jobson also provided character evidence to the court in support of Ward. Jobson described Ward as being like a “brother” to her and characterised him as being “lovely, polite, and outgoing” and “intelligent and hardworking, and popular”, Jobson added that Ward has “put his blood sweat and tears” into his profession as reflected in the awards he has received, she also stated that “The allegations are in stark contrast to the gentle and kind-hearted man I know.” and that she had never felt uncomfortable around him.

=== Judge’s directions ===
In issuing directions to the jury prior to deliberation, HHJ Rosa Dean told jurors that their key fact-finding task was to decide whether there had been consent, and whether there had been a reasonable belief in consent. If they had been persuaded as to be ‘sure’ that there was neither, they were to find Ward guilty.

=== Deliberation and verdict ===
The trial entered the jury deliberation stage on 9 July 2026. The jury deliberated for a total of 5 hours and 25 minutes.

On 10 July 2026, at Snaresbrook Crown Court, the jury completed deliberation and unanimously found him not guilty of all five charges.

Ward stood quietly in the dock with his hand to his mouth as the jury foreman slowly announced the verdict reached on each charge. When the foreman finished announcing the five unanimous verdicts, Ward burst into tears and leaned heavily on his defence lawyer, who helped a sobbing Ward from the courtroom. There were shouts of relief from his family and friends in the public gallery, some of whom held back tears.

=== Post-acquittal ===
Following the verdict, Ward stood outside Snaresbrook Crown Court beside his solicitor to issue a statement. Humzah Ilyas, of Hickman & Rose, said on Ward’s behalf:

“As he maintained throughout this case, this was a consensual sexual encounter. The jury agreed and cleared him of all wrongdoing.” He later added: “As he starts to rebuild his life, Micheal would like to acknowledge those who have experienced sexual violence and abuse. They deserve to be heard, treated with compassion, and have their allegations taken seriously.”
