= Harrow Crown Court =

Judicial building in Harrow, north London, England

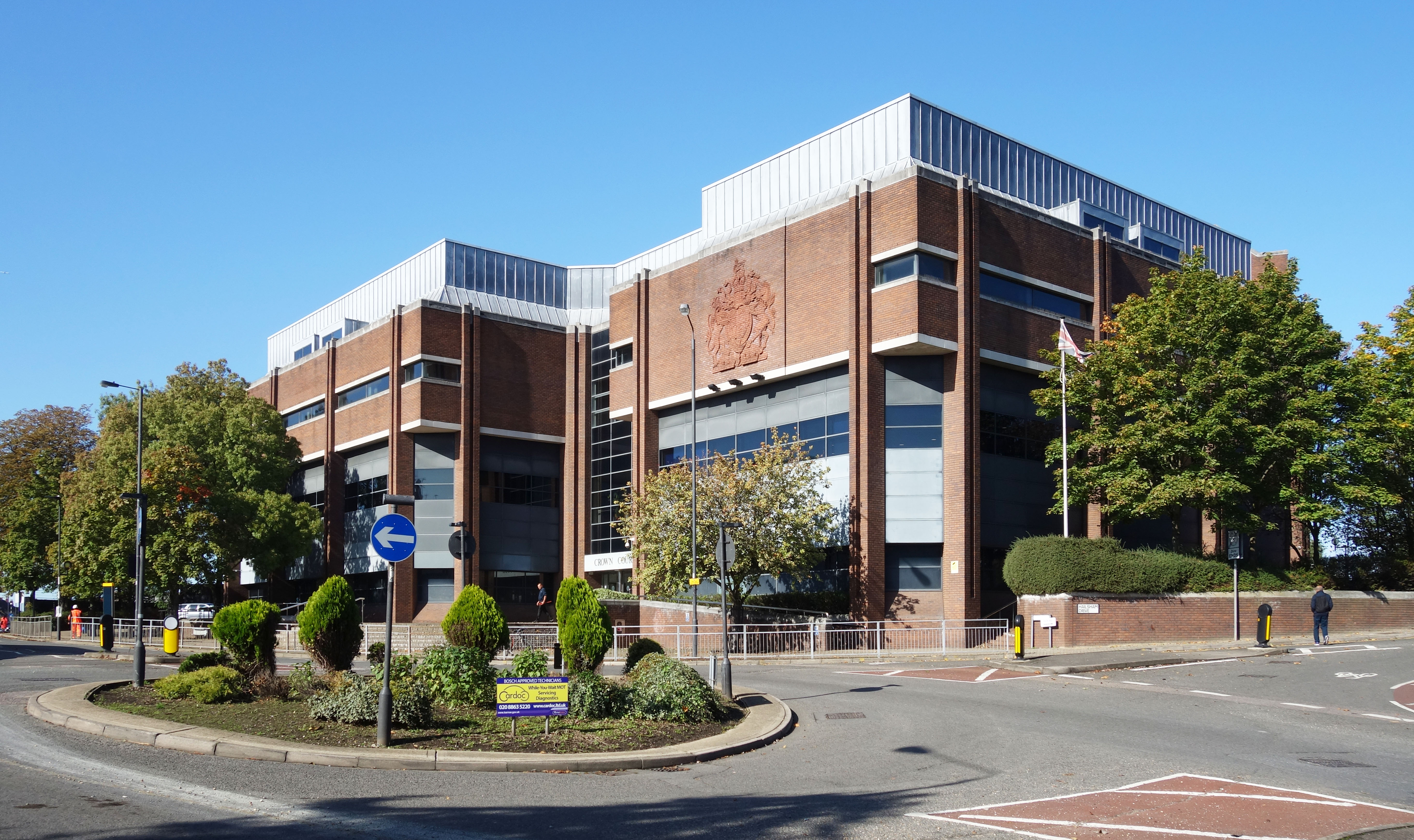
- Harrow Crown Court

- Shown in London
- 51.5939°N 0.3399°W
- Location: Hailsham Drive, Harrow

History
- Built: 1991

Site notes
- Architect: Kyle Stewart
- Architectural style: Modern style

Harrow Crown Court is a Crown Court venue which deals with criminal cases at Hailsham Drive, Harrow, London.

== History ==
Until the 1980s, the principal criminal court for north London was the Middlesex Guildhall in Parliament Square. However, as the number of criminal cases in north London grew, it became necessary to commission a dedicated courthouse for northwest London. The site selected by the Lord Chancellor's Department had been occupied by a printing business established in the 19th century and known as "David Allan" which produced theatrical posters and ration books; the operation was acquired by HM Stationery Office in the 1920s but the factory closed in the 1980s.

The building was designed by Kyle Stewart in the modern style, built in red brick with glass features at a cost of £17.6 million, and was completed in April 1991. The design involved three sections facing onto Headstone Drive. The central section, which accommodated the main entrance, was fully faced with glass, while the section to the left, which was slightly projected forward, and the section to the right, which featured a prominent Royal coat of arms, were faced with glass on the lower floors and with brick on the upper floors. Internally, the building was laid out to accommodate eight courtrooms.

Notable cases heard at the court have included the trial and conviction, in 1998, of the ex-British National Party politician Nick Griffin for "publishing or distributing racially inflammatory written material", and the trial and conviction, in 2016, of the stalker, Alex Gray, for a seven-year campaign of harassment against the English singer-songwriter and actress, Lily Allen.

In 2014, cases at the court were delayed after barristers staged a protest outside against cuts in government funding for Legal Aid to defendants.

In August 2023, reinforced autoclaved aerated concrete was found in the building, leading to the immediate closure of the building for an indefinite period.
