= Cardiff Crown Court =

Historic building in Cardiff, Wales

- Llys y Goron Caerdydd
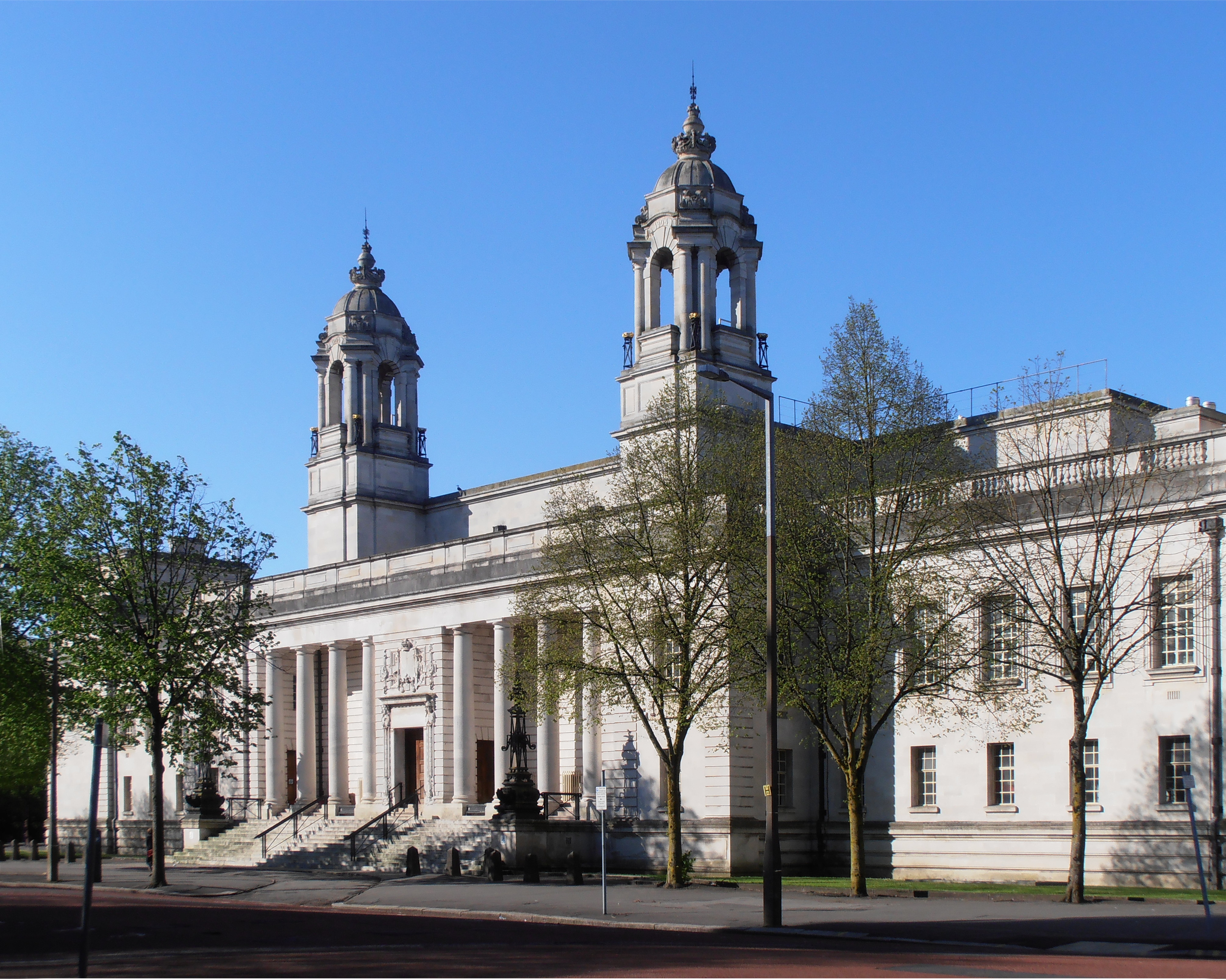
- The main eastern entrance to the Crown Courts from King Edward VII Avenue

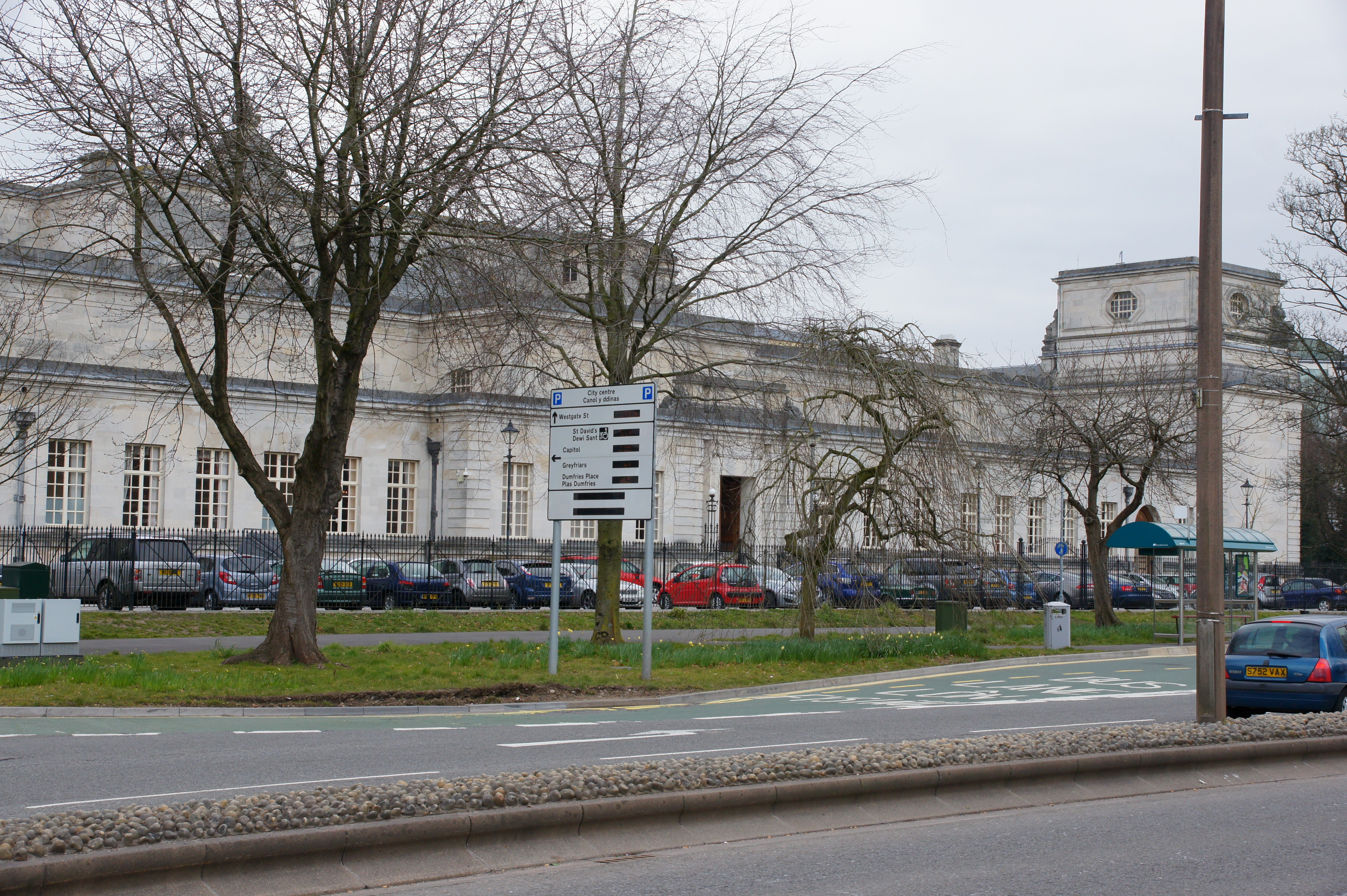
- The rear western side of the Crown Courts from North Road (the A470)
- 51.48459°N 3.1802°W
- Established: 1906
- Location: Wales
- Coordinates: 51.48459°N 3.1802°W
- Composition method: Crown Court
- Appeals to: Court of Appeal, (Royal Courts of Justice)
- Website: Cardiff Crown Court

Recorder of Cardiff
- Currently: Tracey Lloyd-Clarke
- Since: 2022

Cardiff Crown Court
- The southern side of the Crown Courts from Boulevard De Nantes (the A4161)
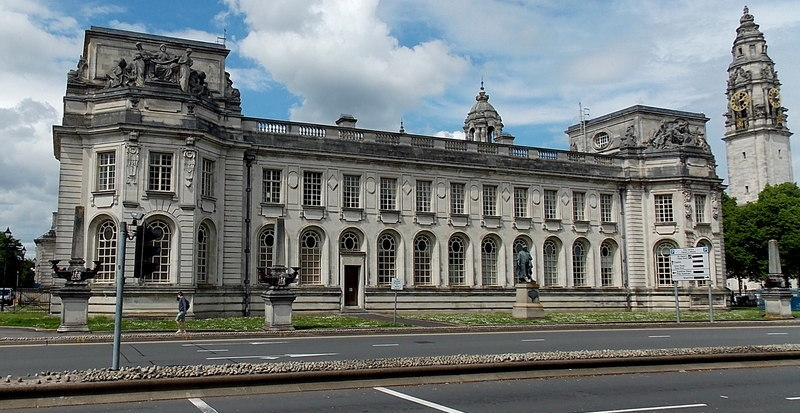

Listed Building – Grade I
- Official name: Law Courts
- Designated: 25 January 1966
- Reference no.: 13736

Cardiff Crown Court (Welsh: Llys y Goron Caerdydd) is a historic building situated in Cathays Park, Cardiff, Wales. The building is a Grade I listed building. As a Crown Court venue it is part of the Wales Circuit of His Majesty's Courts and Tribunals Service. The court house has nine courtrooms in addition to one "virtual" courtroom. The senior judge at the court is Judge Tracey Lloyd-Clarke, the Recorder of Cardiff.

== History ==
Cathays Park was purchased in 1898 by the Borough of Cardiff from the 3rd Marquess of Bute for £160,000 and developed into the Cardiff Civic Centre by William Harpur, a council engineer. A competition for the law courts and the nearby town hall took place in 1897, and it was won by Lanchester, Stewart and Rickards. Building work commenced in 1901 and the external structure was complete by 1904. The building was opened by the 3rd Marquess of Bute in October 1906. Courts 1 and 2, formerly Crown Court (north) and Nisi Prius Court (south) were added to between 1966 and 1990 and the building was fully refurbished between 1991 and 1995.

== Architecture ==
Located on King Edward VII Avenue, the east entrance front of the Law Courts faces the side of Cardiff City Hall. Writing in 1995, Newman observes that the projecting nine bay centre of the courts is of a more solemn composition than the city hall, reflecting its serious role compared to the more celebratory function of its neighbour. The front of the court boasts a full-scale external order, with unfluted Doric columns carrying a simplified entablature. The columns are arranged in pairs forming a recessed loggia, while the end bays host channelled quoins. Rising above are two large stone turrets with domical tops and paired diagonally projecting colonnettes, reminiscent of Wren. The central main doorway is set forward in line with the columns, with a richly carved coat of arms above. The front bays are observed to have the character of a temple or church due to the flight of heavy steps that rise up to meet them. The steps are flanked by two large bronze lampstands adorned with dragons.

The south-facing side of the court was designed as a sister piece to the town hall, with Baroque features that helped established their reputation as setting a new standard in the emergence of the Edwardian grand style for public buildings in Britain. The external details lend heavily from the Baroque of south Germany and Austria combined with the neo-Baroque of Charles Garnier's Paris opera house. The similarities between the courts and the city hall can be seen through the south fronts, with bulging banded plinth and broad areas of channelling at angles and breaks, long round-headed lower windows set in concave surrounds and at the outer end of each facade, three-bay canted projections. Although difficult to appreciate from the ground, and more obvious from the building plans, is the off-centre tower of the city hall which was placed to link the two buildings, as it stands over the west side entrance of the hall and is aligned on the axis of the portico of the law courts. Despite the heavy relationship in style, what makes the facades appear quite different is the prodigious centrepiece of City Hall which contrasts sharply from the emphasised centre of the law courts.

Adorning the top of the Crown Courts are several attic sculptures, representing Welsh Science and Education by Donald McGill and Welsh Commerce and Industry by Paul Raphael Montford. Both were added in 1906, and like much of the Baroque were later additions to the submitted winning design. Central to the south side, on the lawn in front, is erected a statue to Judge Gwilym Williams by Welsh artist Goscombe John.

To the interior, Newman finds only one space of any architectural note, that of the main hall from the front entrance. Here, flights of steps rise and divide the space into a three bay room set transversely. The hall is crowned by three saucer domes on pendentives, between which lunette windows light from both the front and back.

== See also ==
- Grade I listed buildings in Cardiff
- Courts of England and Wales
- List of Crown Court venues in England and Wales
