= Hove Trial Centre =

Judicial building in Hove, England

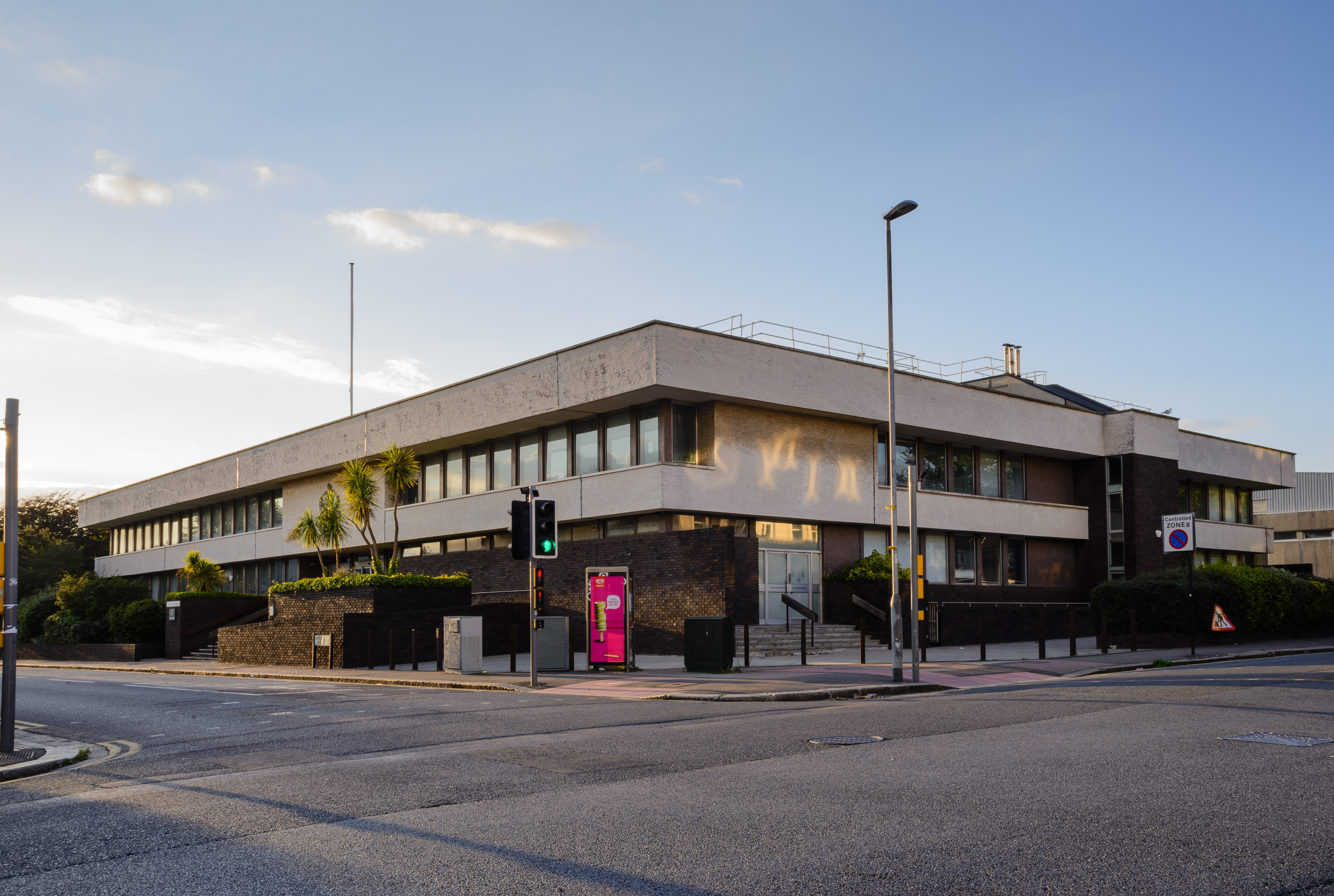
- Hove Trial Centre

- Shown in East Sussex
- 50.8286°N 0.1617°W
- Location: Lansdowne Road, Hove

History
- Built: 1972

Site notes
- Architect: Fitzroy Robinson & Partners
- Architectural style: Modernist style

Hove Trial Centre is a Crown Court venue, which deals with criminal cases, as well as a magistrates' court in Lansdowne Road, Hove, England.

== History ==
For much of the 20th century, criminal court hearings in Hove took place in the old Town Hall. Although much of the building was badly damaged by a fire in January 1966, the magistrates' court and court offices moved to the western part of the building, which had not been damaged by the fire. However, as the number of court cases in Hove grew, it became necessary to commission a more modern courthouse to accommodate the crown court and the magistrates' court. The site selected by the Lord Chancellor's Department, on the north side of Lansdowne Road, was open land which had once been occupied by a group of allotment gardens.

The new building was designed by Fitzroy Robinson & Partners in the Modernist style, built in brown-blue brick from Staffordshire at a cost of £380,000 and was completed in 1972. The design involved a low-set, "strongly horizontal" structure facing onto Lansdowne Road. At the centre of the main frontage there was a short flight of steps leading up to an opening containing three glass doorways; above the opening was a concrete panel bearing a Royal coat of arms. The ground floor, which was brick-faced, was recessed under concrete panelling, while the first floor, which was fenestrated with a row of casement windows, was recessed under concrete panelling in a similar style. Internally, the building was laid out to accommodate four courtrooms.

Notable cases have included the trial and conviction of a car mechanic, Daniel Appleton, in December 2020, for the murder of his wife and a neighbour. They have also included the trial and conviction of a builder, Mark Brown, for the murders of Alexandra Morgan and Leah Ware.
