= Brighton Law Courts =

Judicial building in Brighton, England

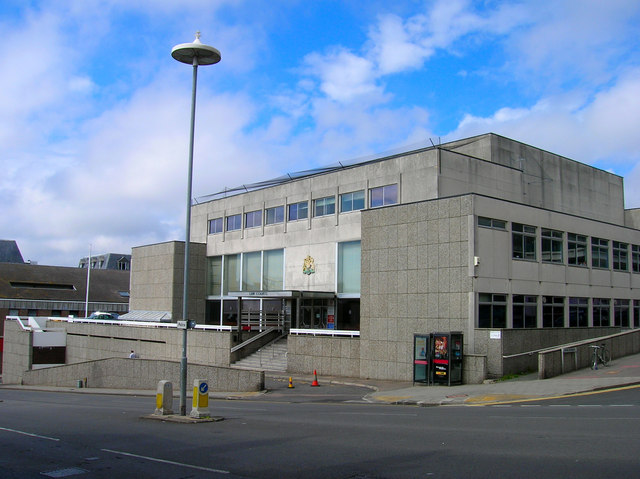
- Brighton Law Courts

- Shown in East Sussex
- 50.8231°N 0.1344°W
- Location: Edward Street, Brighton

History
- Built: 1967

Site notes
- Architect: Percy Billington
- Architectural style: Brutalist style

Brighton Law Courts is a Crown Court venue, which deals with serious criminal cases, and a Magistrates' court venue in Edward Street, Brighton, England.

== History ==
Until the mid-1960s, the quarter sessions in Brighton were held in Brighton Town Hall. However, as the number of criminal cases in the Brighton area grew, it became necessary to commission a more modern courthouse. The site selected by the Lord Chancellor's Department, on the north side of Edward Street, had accommodated a series of rows of terraced housing (William Street, Henry Street and John Street) before the area was cleared.

The new building was designed by the borough architect, Percy Billington, in the brutalist style, built in concrete and glass at a cost of £665,000 and was officially opened by the Lord Chancellor, Lord Gardiner, on 3 November 1967. The design involved a broadly symmetrical main frontage of ten bays facing onto Edward Street. The central section of eight bays featured a flight of steps leading up to an entrance slightly to the right of centre. The entrance was covered by a canopy supported by steel columns, above which, there was a concrete panel bearing a Royal coat of arms. The central section were fenestrated by large glass panels in the other bays on the lower two floors, and by a row of small square casement windows on the second floor. The end bays, which formed the visible part of side wings stretching along William Street and John Street, were projected forward and completely faced in concrete panels. Internally, the building was laid out to accommodate two courtrooms for the quarter sessions, two courtrooms for the magistrates, and one courtroom for the coroner. Following implementation of the Courts Act 1971, the two courtrooms allocated for the quarter sessions became the venue for hearings of the crown court.

After an extensive refurbishment of the building, during which the magistrates were accommodated at the former parochial offices in Princes Street, the building was formally re-opened by the Lord Chief Justice, Lord Lane, on 27 April 1989.

Notable cases have included the trial and conviction of a kitchen worker, Francesco D'Agostino, in October 2020, for the murder of an Albanian immigrant, Serxhio Marku.
