= Brighton Town Hall, England =

Municipal building in Brighton, East Sussex, England

Brighton Town Hall
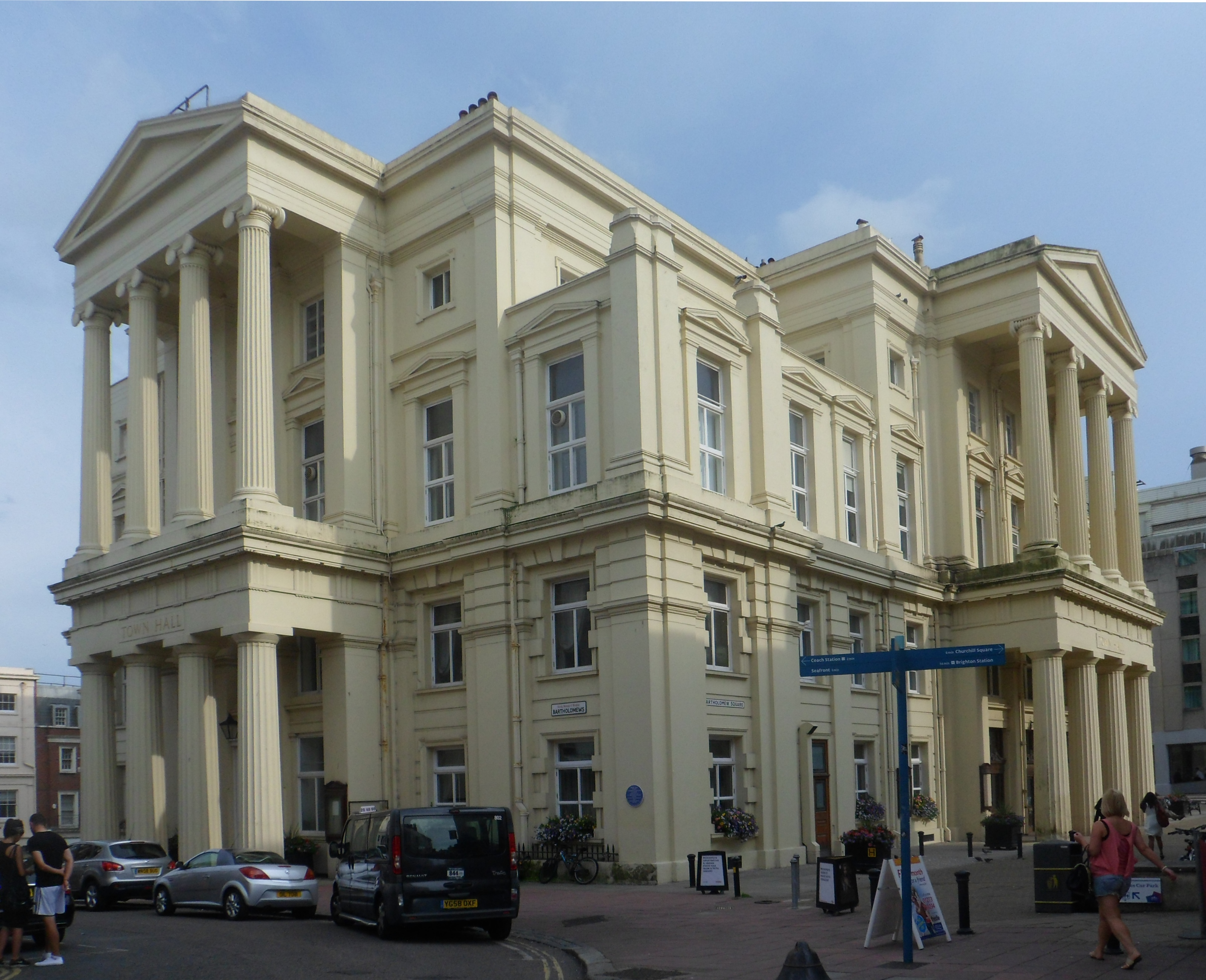
- Brighton Town Hall

- Shown in East Sussex
- 50.8208°N 0.1401°W
- Location: Brighton, East Sussex

History
- Built: 1832

Site notes
- Architect: Thomas Cooper
- Architectural style: Greek Revival style

Listed Building – Grade II
- Designated: 20 August 1971
- Reference no.: 1379974

Brighton Town Hall stands on Bartholomew Square in Brighton, East Sussex, England. The town hall contains a number of police cells which were in use until the 1960s, and which now form the Old Police Cells Museum. The town hall is a Grade II listed building. It was formerly the headquarters of Brighton Borough Council and is still used for some meetings of the successor Brighton and Hove City Council.

== History ==
The site occupied by the town hall was once the location of the Priory of Bartholomew, which was damaged by French raiders in June 1514. The priory disappeared completely as a result of the Chantries Act 1547 and the site was then used as a market place in the 17th century. The current building was commissioned to replace a previous town hall which had been built in 1727 on the western side of Market Street.

The foundation stone for the new building was laid by Thomas Read Kemp, a local property developer who had encouraged the initiative, in April 1830. The new building, which was designed by Thomas Cooper in the Greek Revival style and built at a cost of £60,000, was officially opened in 1832. The design included, on each side, a four-storey portico with a Doric order columns below and an Ionic order columns above, with a pediment on top. The local police force, which was formed in 1838, established a police station in the building and police cells in the basement. On 12 and 13 November 1858, the author Charles Dickens gave a reading of A Christmas Carol to a large audience at the town hall and, on 16 September 1861, the opera singer Adelina Patti performed there during a concert given by the composer and pianist Wilhelm Kuhe.

The building was the venue for the quarter sessions until hearings moved to the Law Courts in Edward Street in 1967. William Thomas Pike was tried by jury for embezzlement in 1878 here.

Brighton Borough Council also used the building as its headquarters. Having outgrown the office space available there, the council built itself modern offices alongside the town hall between 1984 and 1987, known as Bartholomew House to the west and Priory House to the south, the latter being linked internally to the old building. Priory House and an adjoining hotel built at the same time facing King's Road were built across the line of Market Street, which used to continue southwards to the seafront. The town hall's main western elevation originally faced Market Street, but since the 1980s redevelopment of the area it has formed the eastern side of an enclosed square called Bartholomew Square, faced by the new buildings on the other sides.

The borough council was replaced in 1997 when Brighton merged with neighbouring Hove to form Brighton and Hove. The new council uses Hove Town Hall as its main offices, but continues to hold some meetings at Brighton Town Hall and uses Bartholomew House as offices and a customer services centre. The council closed Priory House in 2011 and the building was subsequently sold and converted to residential use, with the linking doorways to the town hall being blocked up.

In March 2003 the town hall was entered by activists protesting at the start of the Iraq War, who caused significant damage to computers and furniture.

The former police cells which had been used for storage since Brighton Police had moved to new facilities in John Street in 1965, were opened up as a museum on 4 May 2005.

== Services ==
Five rooms within the town hall are licensed for wedding ceremonies; these are the Regency Room, the Fitzherbert Room, the Floral Room, the Mayor's Parlour and the Council Chamber. The city's register office is located in the building and the prison cells can be visited as part of the Old Police Cells Museum.

== See also ==
- Grade II listed buildings in Brighton and Hove: A–B
