= Carlisle Courts of Justice =

Judicial building in Carlisle, England

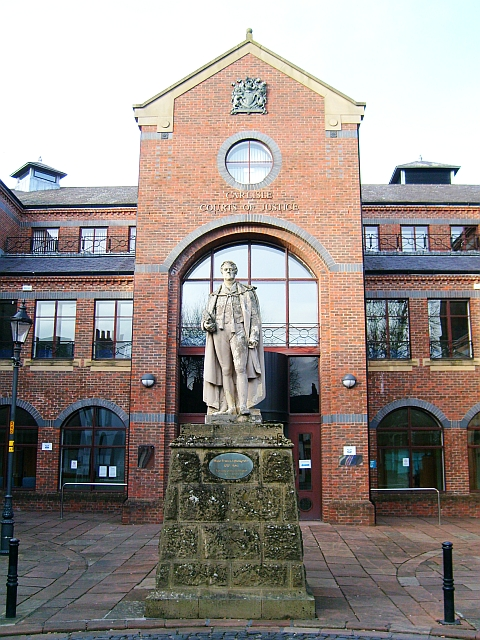
- Carlisle Courts of Justice

- Shown in Cumbria
- 54.8935°N 2.9315°W
- Location: Earl Street, Carlisle

History
- Built: 1992

Site notes
- Architect: Napper Collerton
- Architectural style: Modernist style

The Carlisle Courts of Justice is a Crown Court venue, which deals with criminal cases, and a County Court venue, which deals with civil cases, in Earl Street, Carlisle, England.

== History ==
Until the early 1990s, all criminal court hearings in Carlisle were held in the Carlisle Citadel. However, as the number of court cases in Carlisle grew, it became necessary to commission a more modern courthouse for criminal matters: the site selected by the Lord Chancellor's Department had been occupied by Hetherington's Cattle Auction Market which dated back at least to the mid-19th century.

The new building was designed by Napper Collerton in the Modernist style, built in red brick with stone dressings at a cost of £9.3 million, and was completed in 1992. The design involved a broadly symmetrical main frontage facing south down Earl Street with the end bays projected forward as pavilions. The central bay, which was also projected forward, featured a revolving door on the ground floor, a large arched window on the first floor and an oculus on the second floor, with a Royal coat of arms in the gable above. The connecting bays flanking the central bay featured lean-to structures spanning the first and second floors: the connecting bays were fenestrated by round headed widows on the ground floor, tall casement windows on the first floor and small square windows on the second floor. At roof level, there was a modillioned cornice. Internally, the building was laid out to accommodate five courtrooms.

A statue of the former member of parliament, Major Francis Aglionby, which was sculpted by Musgrave Watson and had been on display in the entrance hall at Carlisle Citadel since 1843, was transferred to the courtyard in front of the main entrance of the new Courts of Justice shortly after it opened.

Notable cases have included the trial and conviction of the alleged sergeant-at-arms of the Lancaster branch of the Satans Slaves Motorcycle Club, Paul Holmes, in June 2016, for the illegal possession of a large quantity of firearms.
