= Snaresbrook =

Area of East London

Coordinates: 51.587027°N 0.014563°E

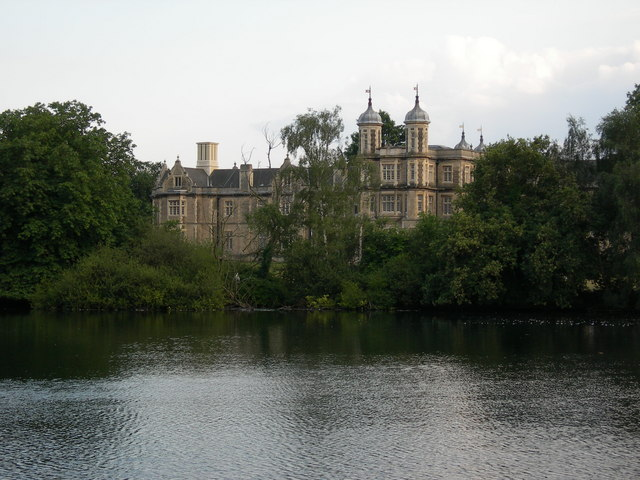
- Eagle Pond and Snaresbrook Crown Court

- Location within Greater London
- Population: 11,868 (2011 Census.Ward)
- OS grid reference: TQ395895
- London borough: Redbridge; Waltham Forest
- Ceremonial county: Greater London
- Region: London
- Country: England
- Sovereign state: United Kingdom
- Post town: LONDON
- Postcode district: E11
- Dialling code: 020
- Police: Metropolitan
- Fire: London
- Ambulance: London
- UK Parliament: Leyton & Wanstead
- London Assembly: Havering and Redbridge; North East

Snaresbrook is a district in the London Borough of Redbridge, in East London. It is located eight miles (13 kilometres) east of Charing Cross.

The name derives from a corruption of Sayers brook, a tributary of the River Roding that flows through Wanstead to the East.

Snaresbrook is bounded approximately by South Woodford to the north, the lower reaches of Epping Forest and Upper Leytonstone, Leyton and Walthamstow to the west, Leytonstone to the south and Wanstead to the east. Snaresbrook Ward in the London Borough of Redbridge covers most of Wanstead High Street. The ward forms part of the 2007 parliamentary boundary changes and is currently entirely within the parliamentary constituency of Leyton and Wanstead (UK Parliament constituency).

Snaresbrook's most notable building is Snaresbrook Crown Court. It was opened in 1843 as the Wanstead Infant Orphan Asylum by King Leopold I of Belgium, and later became the Royal Wanstead School. It was designed by Sir George Gilbert Scott and William Bonython Moffatt.

== Demography ==
According to the 2011 census, 57% of the population is White British, with the second and third largest ethnicities being Other White at 10% and Indian at 9%.

== Education ==
Snaresbrook Primary is one of the schools in Snaresbrook.

Forest School was used in the filming of Never Let Me Go for the Hailsham assembly scenes.

== Transport and locale ==
Nearest areas

- Wanstead
- Leytonstone
- Leyton
- Woodford
- Walthamstow

The nearest London Underground station is Snaresbrook on the Epping branch of the Central line.

== Goofs/Errors ==
In 2023 and 2024, Google Street View is inserting images from Chigwell in November 2008 into various Snaresbrook streets in the "Nov 2008" box. The reason they are doing this is currently unknown.
