= Snaresbrook Crown Court =

Historic building in Snaresbrook, London

Coordinates: 51°34′47″N 0°1′0″E

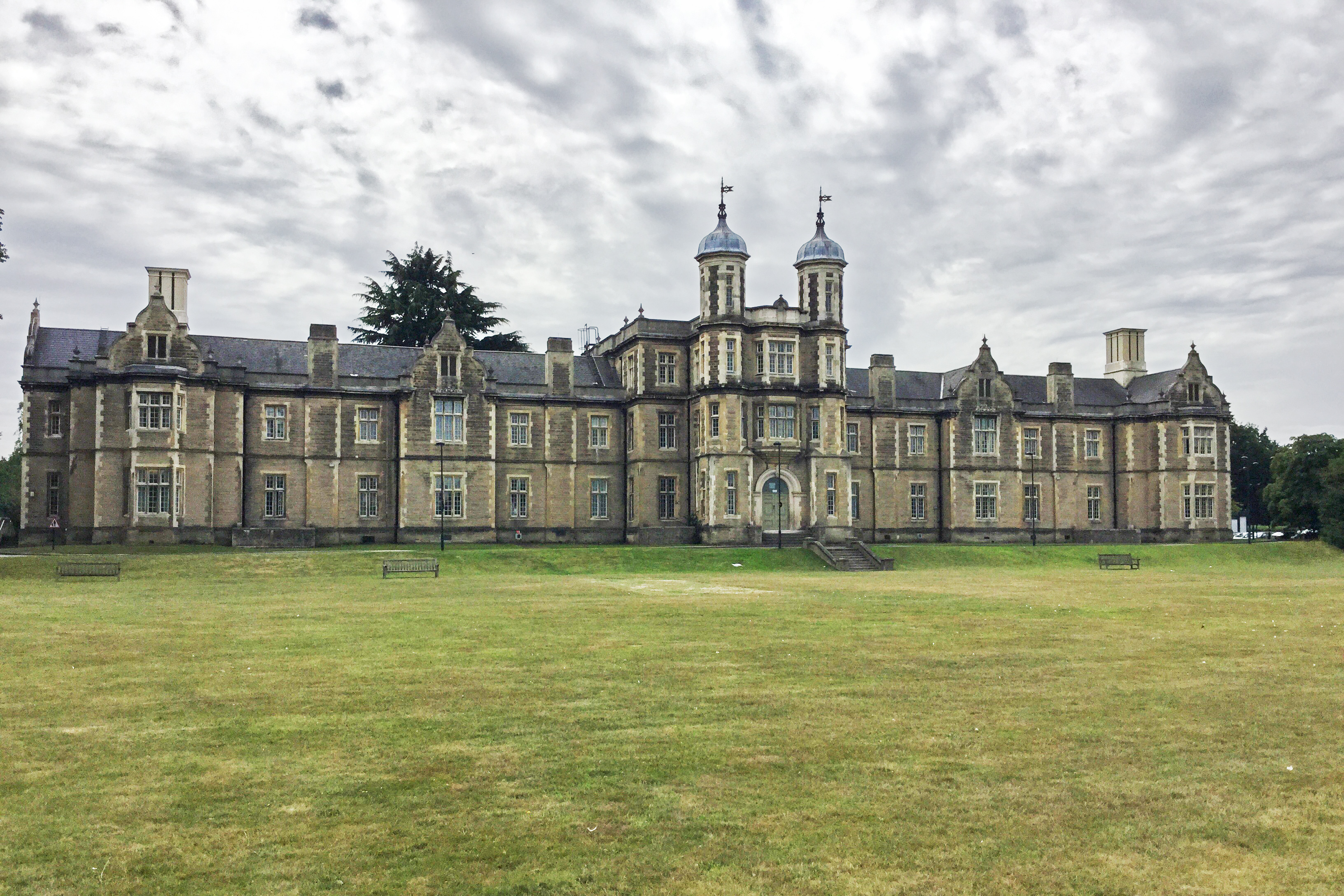

- Location within Greater London
- Former names: Wanstead Infant Orphan Asylum (1843–1938); Royal Wanstead School (1938–1971)

General information
- Type: Crown Court
- Location: 75 Hollybush Hill, E11 1QW, Redbridge, London, England
- Groundbreaking: 1841
- Completed: 1843; 183 years ago

Design and construction
- Architects: George Gilbert Scott; William Bonython Moffatt

Listed Building – Grade II
- Criteria: Historic Interest; Architectural Interest
- Designated: 11 November 1968
- Reference no.: 1358004

Snaresbrook Crown Court is a historic, Grade II listed building situated in Snaresbrook, an area within the London Borough of Redbridge. It is one of 12 Crown Court centres serving Greater London and is designated as a third-tier court. It is set within 18 acres of grounds and has its own lake, known as Eagle Pond. It operates 20 court rooms and manages 7,000 cases a year, making it the busiest Crown Court centre in the United Kingdom.

Construction of the building began in 1841 and finished two years later. It was built in the Jacobean gothic style by the English architects George Gilbert Scott and William Bonython Moffatt, who were prolific designers of workhouses, hospitals and churches. Snaresbrook Crown Court was originally built as an orphanage at the behest of the philanthropist Andrew Reed who named it the Infant Orphanage Asylum; later it became the Royal National Children's Foundation. Under various titles, it remained an orphanage until 1938 when it became the Royal Wanstead School. The building continued as a school until 1971 when it passed into the ownership of the British government who converted the building into a crown court at a cost of £1.6m in 1973. The building opened as a crown court on 26 November 1974.

Since becoming a court, the building has had various extensions added externally and has received many alterations to its interior. In 1988 an outer annex, not connected to the original building, was built to accommodate further court rooms, to a cost of £3 million. The court is located on Hollybush Hill, and is opposite the junction to High Street, Wanstead. The nearest tube station is Snaresbrook on the Central line.

== History ==
=== Design and plan ===
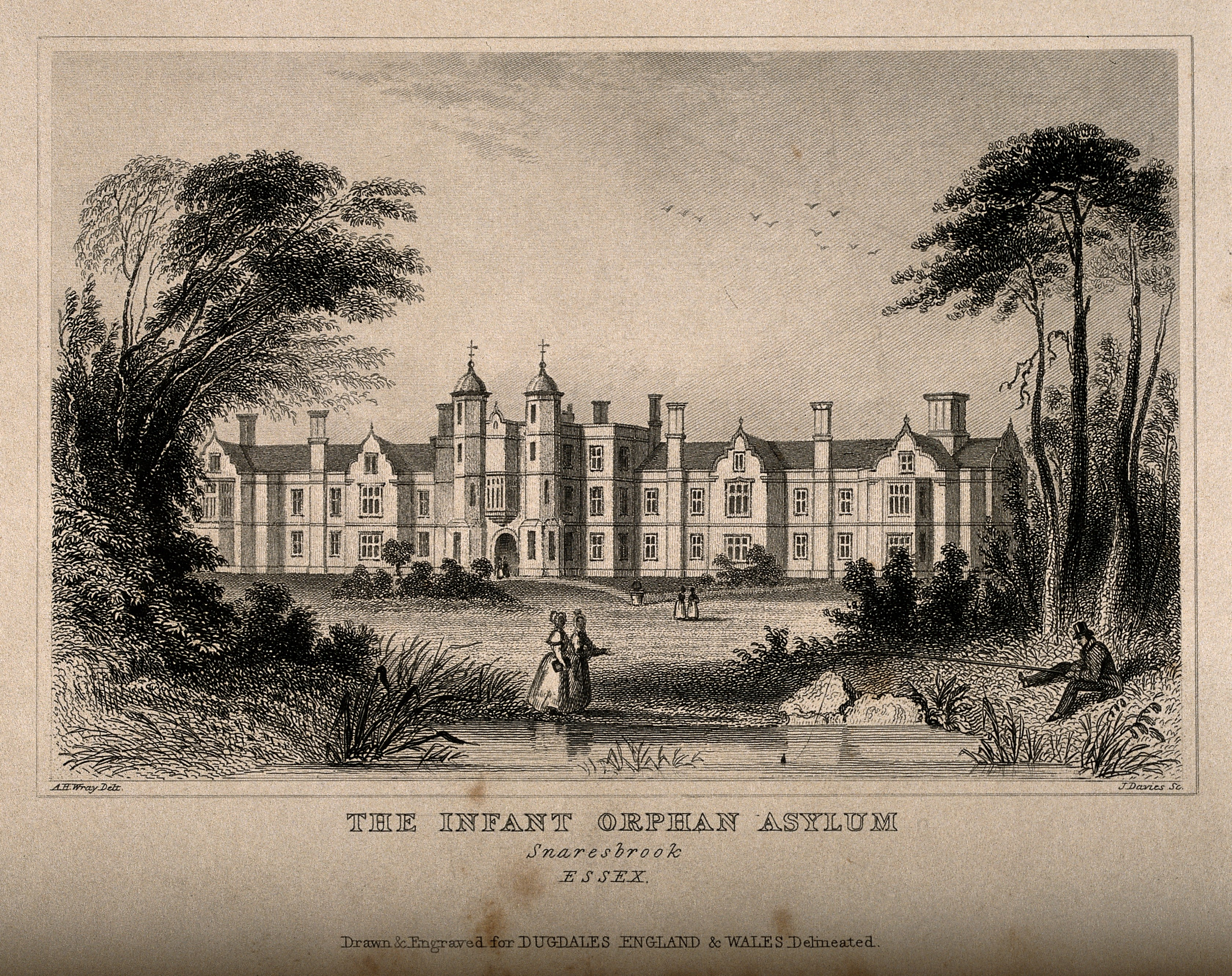
An 1851 etching of the Infant Orphan Asylum

The building was designed by George Gilbert Scott and William Bonython Moffatt who were in partnership between 1835 and 1844 and were prolific designers of workhouses, hospitals and churches, although it was Scott who designed the external appearance of the building. The building was an early commission for Scott, who had been in practise for around 10 years. The appointed builder was William Jay, who was based at Tower Hill.

The original building was built to a 'H' plan. The original ranges are constructed of London stock brick, with a coursed, squared and hammer-dressed Sneaton stone facing, and Bath and Caen stone dressings to the front and side elevations. The roofs are covered using Westmorland slate and lead. Internally, there are cast-iron beams that support its timber floors. To the rear is the former assembly hall, added in 1862, which is built using London stock brick with slate roofs. Further to its exterior there are stone mullion and transom windows, turrets and ogee domes. The round arched entrance features an entablature above the main doors with the inscription "A structure of hope built on the foundations of faith by the hand of charity", which is flanked either side by arcaded ground floors. Rain water heads around the main building carry the date "1842", emboldened on the front face.

At the south end of the main range there is a chapel, which was added in 1860, indicated by dated rainwater heads to the walls. Internally, the chapel has a wide chancel arch with a canted apse and some stained glass windows, depicting the Life of Christ and Acts of Mercy, by William Morris. It is two-storeys high and is six bays long by five bays wide. It has a quarry-faced plinth, ashlar quoins and stepped buttresses between Perpendicular windows to the ground floor. The chancel window has four trefoil-headed lights beneath more elaborate curvilinear tracery.

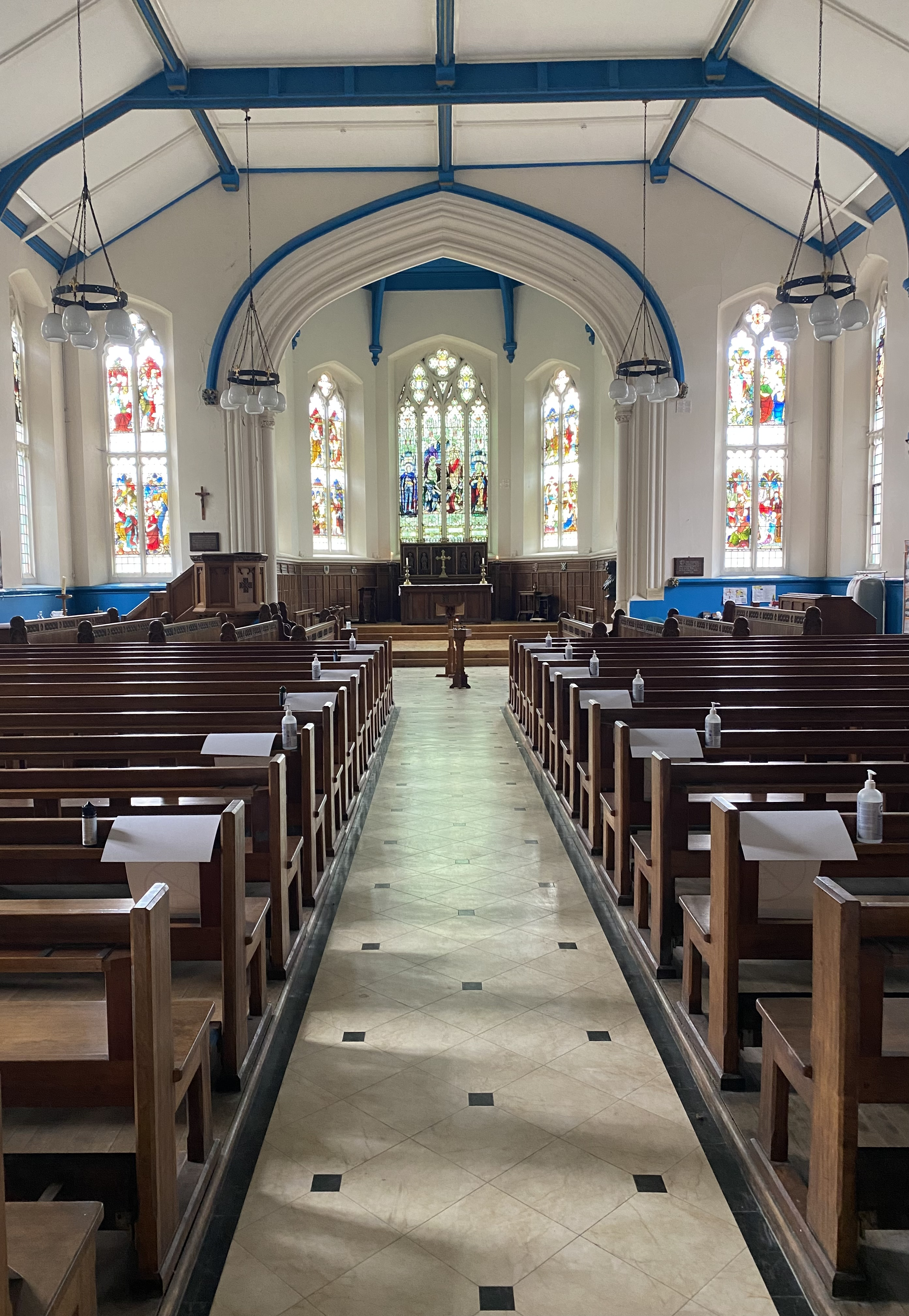
Chapel, located at the south end of the main range

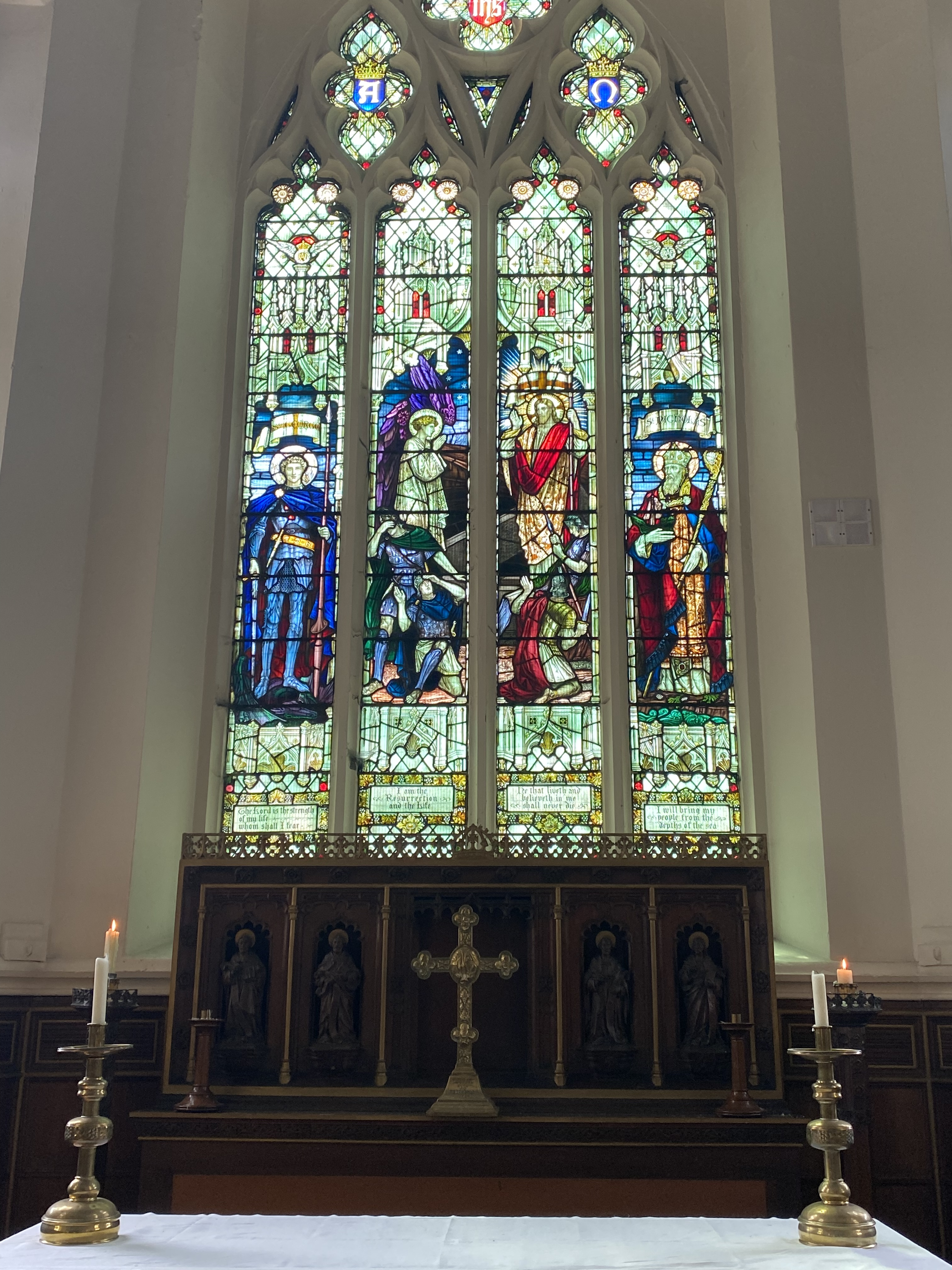
South window comprising stained glass by Morris & Co., c.1920, depicting the Life of Christ and Acts of Mercy

Upon its completion, the interior of the orphanage was sparely fitted out and was described in The Builder as being "lofty and lacking comfort". The architectural historian Nikolaus Pevsner, in his Buildings of England series of books, described the building as an "impressive, but rather dull symmetrical Jacobean composition".

=== Orphanage ===
The Wanstead Infant Orphan Asylum was founded by the philanthropist Andrew Reed in 1827 and was based in Hackney. In the 1830s, and owing to a lack of space in the current building, Reed applied to the Crown Estate for a section of land in Snaresbrook, which was then part of Wanstead Forest, and a grant to help fund the building of a new premises. The application was successful and construction started on 27 June 1841. Scott and Moffatt were chosen to design the orphanage; the foundation stone was laid by Albert, Prince Consort in 1841. The Infant Orphanage Asylum was officially opened on 27 June 1843 by Leopold I of Belgium. It is designed in the Jacobean gothic style and cost £35,000 to construct. Queen Victoria was the first in a long line of royal patrons.

The 1881 census recorded there being 74 staff and over 400 children at the institution. The charity's eligibility criteria required that children had to be either fatherless or entirely orphaned; under the age of seven; and that their late fathers would have to have been considered by the trustees to be either "creditable" (not earning less than £50 a year upon their death), "respectable" (£100 a year), or "very respectable" (£400 a year). In exceptional circumstances, the institution accepted children whose fathers were still alive but "subject to confirmed lunacy or paralysis", according to a reporter for the Derbyshire Courier. Once admitted the institution would house and look after the children up to the age of 15. The youngest recorded child to reside at the orphanage was a six-month-old girl in 1849. An infirmary was added to the orphanage in the 1850s, followed by the chapel in 1860, an assembly hall in 1862 and a swimming pool in 1880. By 1860 there were 595 fatherless children housed at the orphanage. King George V, who was the patron of Reed's charity, renamed the asylum the Royal Infant Orphanage, in 1919.

=== School ===
In 1939 the building became the Royal Wanstead School, after a request from King George VI and Prince George, Duke of Kent became its patron. As well as a refuge for orphans, it also allowed children from impoverished families to join its register. These inductions were brief and stopped altogether in 1942 owing to the introduction of the welfare state, which allowed poor families to live together. During the Second World War, Winston Churchill, a governor at the school, arranged for the evacuation of the school's children to neighbouring boroughs, and the building was occupied by British troops, as well as holding Italian prisoners of war. During the conflict, the building's south west corner sustained some bomb damage; it was rebuilt in 1948. The school received grammar school status in the years after the establishment of the Education Act in 1944 and then became a secondary modern, which was funded by the Local Education Authority. By the late 1960s the school experienced a decline in pupil admissions and fell into financial difficulties. It closed in 1971 and the Royal National Children's Foundation became established.

=== Crown Court ===
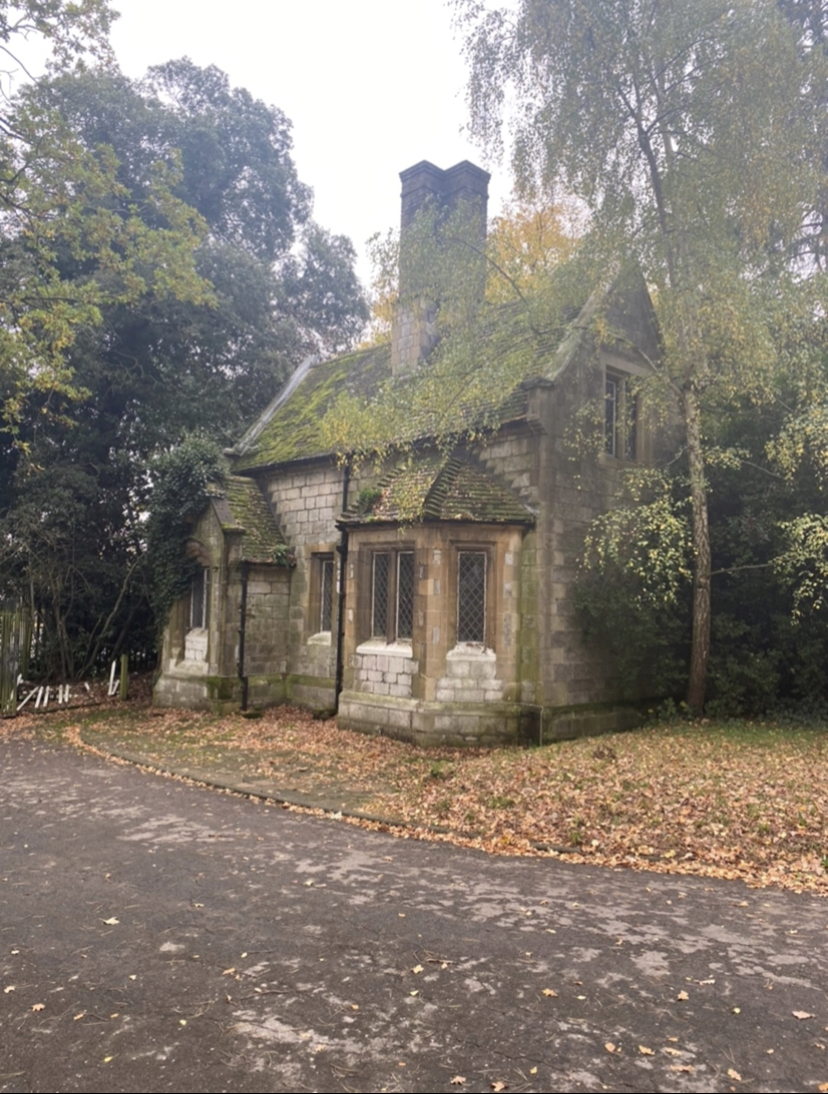
The gatekeeper’s lodge (top) and former indoor swimming pool

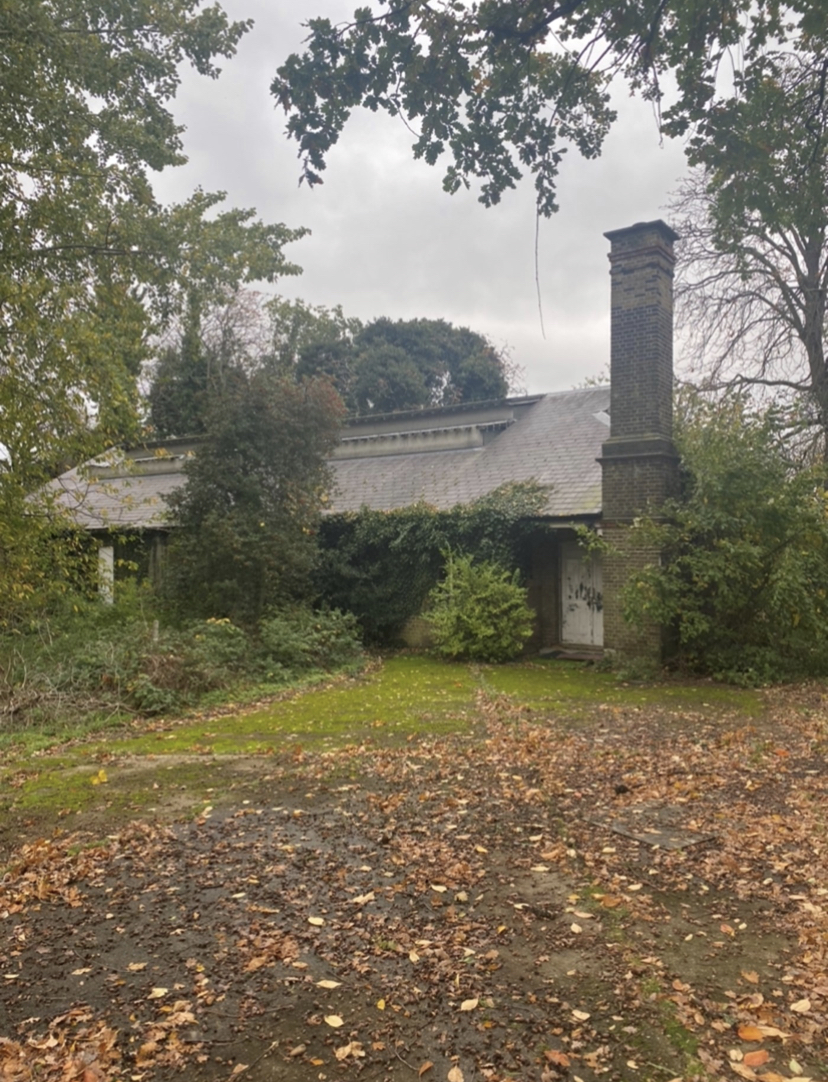

On 25 December 1971 the building came into the ownership of the Department of the Environment. A report carried out by the royal commission on assizes and court of quarter sessions, chaired by Lord Beeching, identified the need to combine the courts of assize and quarter sessions. The new court was to be called a crown court and its purpose was detailed in the Courts Act 1971. The school was identified as being a suitable venue and it was leased by the Department of the Environment for works to begin on its conversion to a court in 1973, at a cost of £1.6m. Internally, the building's chapel and North Wing are the only two areas to remain in their original states, together with the exterior.

The renovations established six new crown court rooms which were intended to serve North East London. Building work was completed in 1974 and was opened on 26 November 1974 by Lord Widgery, who was, at that time, Lord Chief Justice. Further improvements were made to the site between 1976 and 1979, but in November 1981 a fire destroyed three courtrooms and damaged two others. Further renovations were made, and by 1988, five more court rooms, including a separate annex, built to a cost of £3 million, had been added, bringing the total of fully functioning court rooms to 20. The court manages around 7,000 cases a year, making it the busiest Crown Court centre in the United Kingdom. The building received Grade II listed status on 11 November 1968.

== Associated buildings ==
There are two associated buildings to the former orphanage within the grounds of the Crown Court centre. The gatekeeper's lodge was built in 1841, probably by Scott and Moffatt, and is adjacent to what was the main opening onto Hollybush Hill. Like the court, the lodge was constructed by the builder William Jay, who was then based at Tower Hill. The lodge was purpose-built for the orphanage's bailiff and his wife, the latter of whom was the site's gatekeeper. The lodge is made of the same materials as the court building, being of coursed, squared and hammer-dressed Sneaton stone with Bath and Caen stone dressings. It has a single-storey, complete with attics, and is built in a T-shaped plan. During the main building's conversion from a school to a court in the 1970s, the lodge entrance was closed off and a new entrance was laid out further up Hollybush Hill, towards the main elevation of the court. The lodge became a private dwelling thereafter, but has remained empty for many years, as of 2019. The lodge was designated as a Grade II listed building on 3 December 2019 to acknowledge its group value with the court.

In 1880 the asylum trustees commissioned the building of an indoor swimming pool, which was erected opposite to the gatekeepers lodge. The pool building is single storey and of rectangular plan; the architect is unknown. The internal swimming pool still exists, but is drained and covered over by a wooden floor. Like the lodge, the pool building is empty and is used for storage. Along with the lodge, it was designated as a Grade II listed building on 3 December 2019 for its group value with the court.

== See also ==
- Courts of the United Kingdom
- List of Crown Court venues in England and Wales

== Sources ==
- Cherry, Bridget; Pevsner, Nikolaus (2005) [1991]. London 5: East. Penguin Books. ISBN 0-300-10701-3.
