= Gloucester Crown Court =

Courthouse in Gloucester, Gloucestershire, England

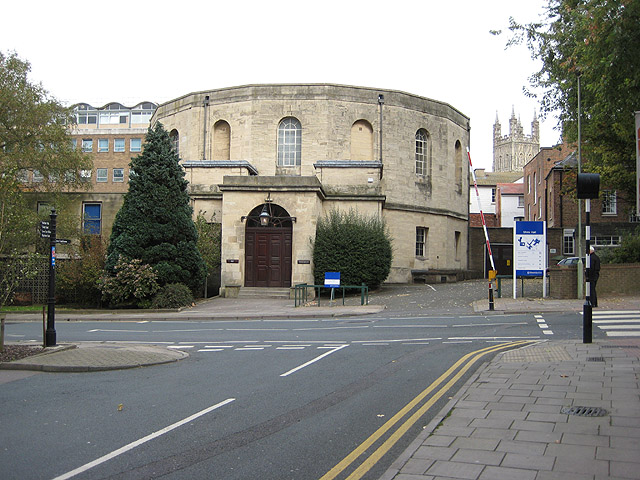
- Gloucester Crown Court

- Location within Gloucestershire
- 51.86608°N 2.24906°W
- Location: Gloucester, Gloucestershire

History
- Built: 1816

Site notes
- Architect: Robert Smirke
- Architectural style: Neoclassical style

Listed Building – Grade II
- Official name: Crown Courts
- Designated: 23 January 1952
- Reference no.: 1271573

Gloucester Crown Court is a Crown Court venue which deals with criminal cases at Bearland, Gloucester, England. The court, which is located at the back of Gloucester Shire Hall, is a grade II listed building.

== History ==
The original venue for judicial hearings in Gloucester was the Booth Hall in Westgate Street which dated from the mid-16th century. However, it was also used as an entertainment venue and, by the early 19th century, it became necessary to commission a dedicated courthouse.

The building was designed by Sir Robert Smirke in the neoclassical style, built in ashlar stone and opened in August 1816. The design involved a symmetrical main frontage in the form of a polygon of nine equal sides facing onto Bearland. The central bay featured a portico, which was projected forward, contained a round headed doorway with a fanlight and was surmounted by a parapet; it was flanked by single-storey porters' offices on either side. The main two-storey structure behind was fenestrated by plain sash windows on the ground floor and by alternating round headed windows and round headed blind recesses on the first floor, and was surmounted by a parapet. Internally, the principal rooms were two full-height semi-circular courtrooms separated by a main corridor which was accessed through the portico. The separate courtrooms enabled nisi prius i.e. civil cases and criminal cases to be tried simultaneously, and the gallery could accommodate 400 people.

The building was used for the assizes and for the court of quarter sessions and, following implementation of the Courts Act 1971, for hearings of the Crown Court. Notable cases have included the trial and conviction in April 2021, of the footballer, Shayne Bradley, for stalking his girlfriend. They have also included the trial and conviction of teenager, Harley Demmon, in November 2021, for the murder of another teenager, Josh Hall.

== See also ==
- Gloucester Court of Probate (no longer used as a court)
