= Crown Court =

Criminal court of first instance of England and Wales

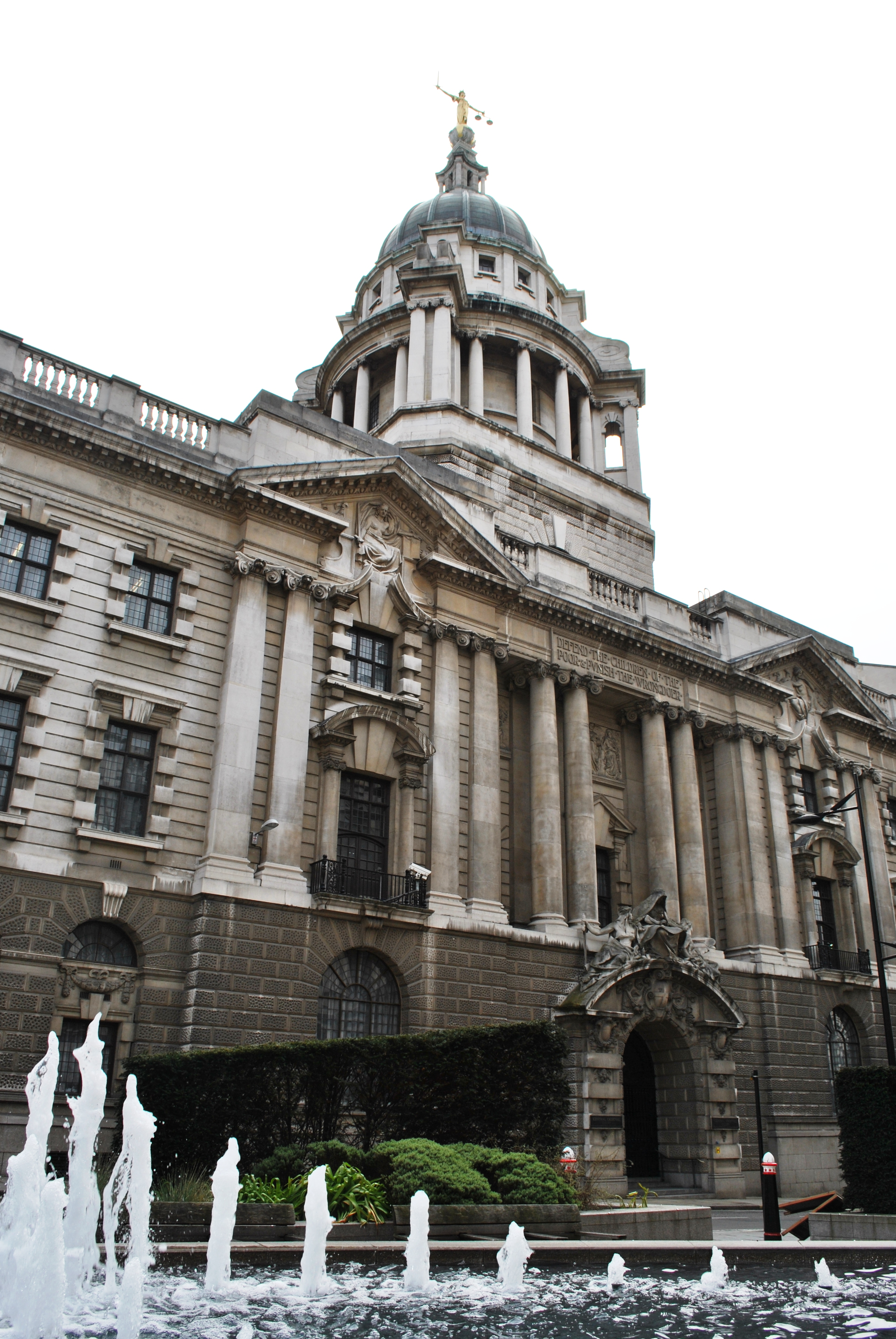
- Central Criminal Court in London
- Established: 1 January 1972
- Jurisdiction: England and Wales
- Authorised by: Courts Act 1971
- Appeals to: Court of Appeal (indictable offences); High Court (case stated)
- Appeals from: Magistrates' courts
- Website: www.judiciary.uk/courts-and-tribunals/crown-court/

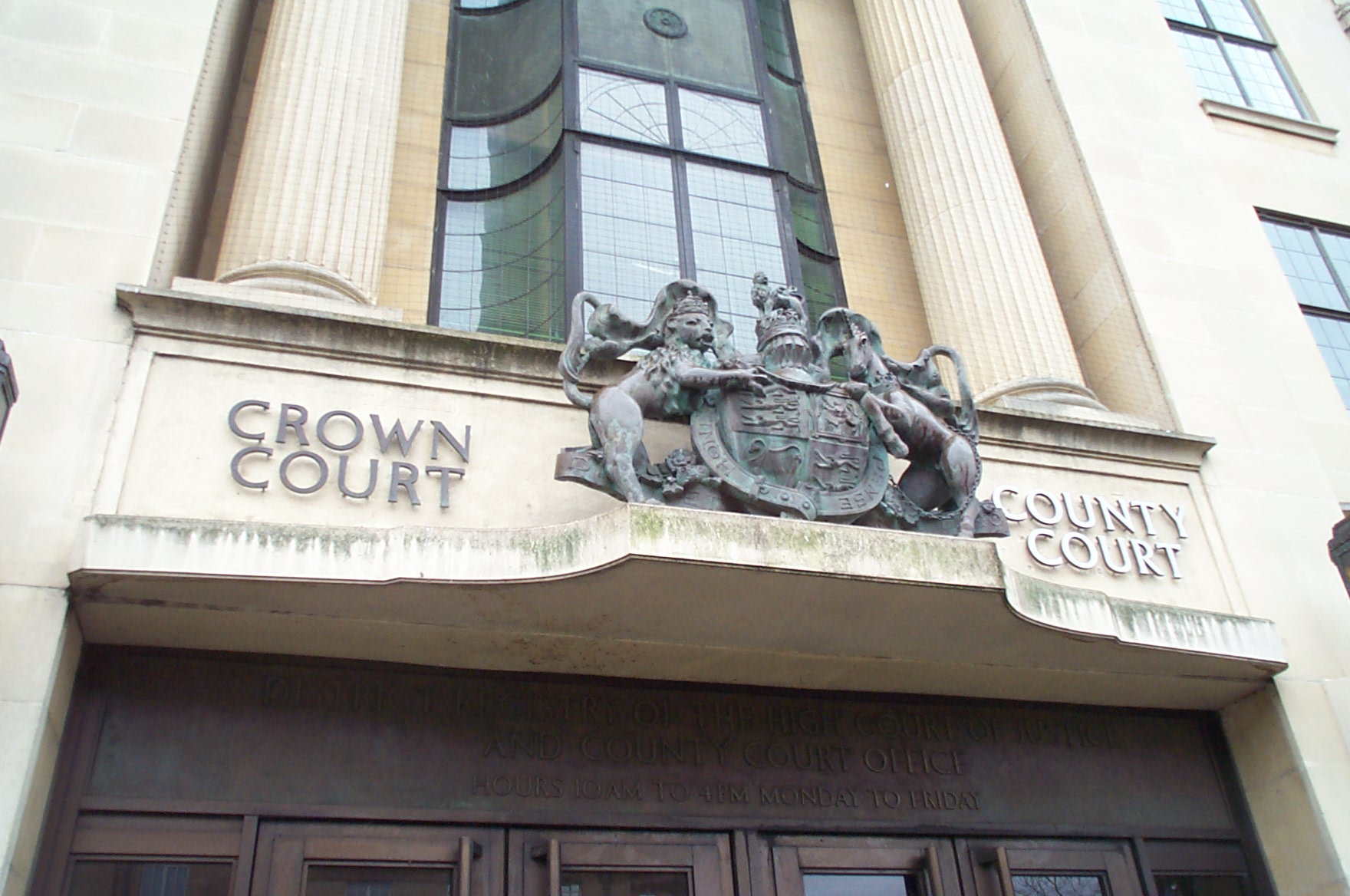
Crown Court and County Court in Oxford.

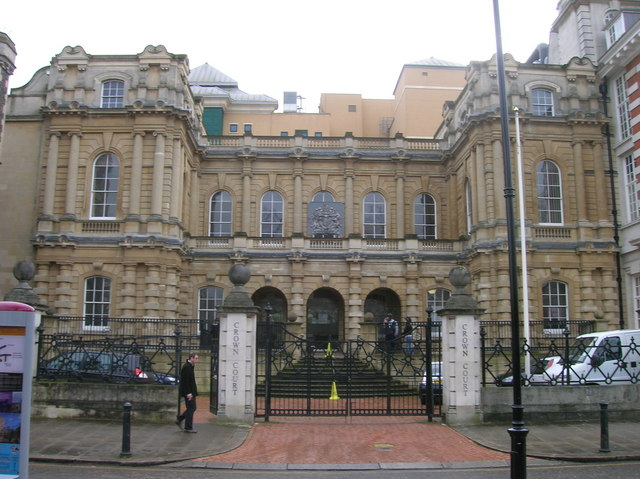
Crown Court in Reading

The Crown Court is the criminal court of first instance in England and Wales responsible for hearing all indictable offences, some either way offences and appeals of the decisions of magistrates' courts. It is one of three Senior Courts of England and Wales.

The Crown Court sits in around 92 locations in England and Wales, divided into Circuits. When sitting in the City of London, it is known as the Central Criminal Court. It is known informally as the "Old Bailey" after the street it is on.

The Crown Court is administered by HM Courts and Tribunals Service, an executive agency of the Ministry of Justice.

== History ==
England and Wales formerly used a system of courts of assize and quarter sessions for indictment trials at first instance. However, the Beeching Commission in 1969 recommended the replacement of the assize system, following the model of the 'crown courts' introduced by the Criminal Justice Administration Act 1956 (4 & 5 Eliz. 2. c. 34). in Liverpool and Manchester.

The current Crown Court was established on 1 January 1972 by the Courts Act 1971, establishing a unitary trial court for the whole jurisdiction.

With the merging of the various court services into what is now HM Courts and Tribunals Service, the Crown Court frequently shares facilities with the County Court and magistrates' courts.

== Procedures ==
The Crown Court carries out four principal types of activity:

- Trials by jury of indictable offences
- Hearing appeals from magistrates' courts
- Sentencing of defendants committed from magistrates' courts
- Sentencing of those convicted in Crown Court

The average time from receipt by the Crown Court to completion was 177 days by the start of 2016.

=== Appeals from magistrates' courts ===
The Crown Court can hear appeals against conviction, sentence or both from those convicted in the magistrates' courts.

Under this procedure, the Crown Court has the power to confirm, reject or alter any part of a decision. It may impose any sentence within the powers of a magistrate.

In 2015 the Crown Court heard 11,348 appeals and the average waiting time was 8.8 weeks in 2015.

=== Sentencing committals from magistrates' courts ===
Defendants may be committed from a magistrates' court where its sentencing powers are inadequate. This could be because:

- The combination of convictions exceeds 12 months' custody
- The conviction requires more than 12 months' custody

Committals may also arise from breaches of the terms of a Community Order or a suspended custodial sentence.

In 2015, the Crown Court dealt with 30,802 cases for sentencing from the magistrates' courts.

== Appealing Crown Court decisions ==
From Crown Court trials on indictment, appeal lies to the criminal division of the Court of Appeal and thence to the Supreme Court.

In all other cases, appeal from the Crown Court lies by way of case stated to a Divisional Court of the High Court.

== People ==
=== Judges ===
The judges who normally sit in the Crown Court are High Court judges, circuit judges and recorders.

- The most serious cases (treason, murder, rape etc.) may be allocated to High Court judges and senior circuit judges.
- Appeals against conviction or sentence arising from the magistrates’ courts are normally heard by a circuit judge or a recorder sitting with one or two experienced magistrates.
- The remainder of cases are dealt with by circuit judges and recorders, although recorders will normally handle less serious work than circuit judges.

Allocation of cases is conducted according to directions given by the Lord Chief Justice.

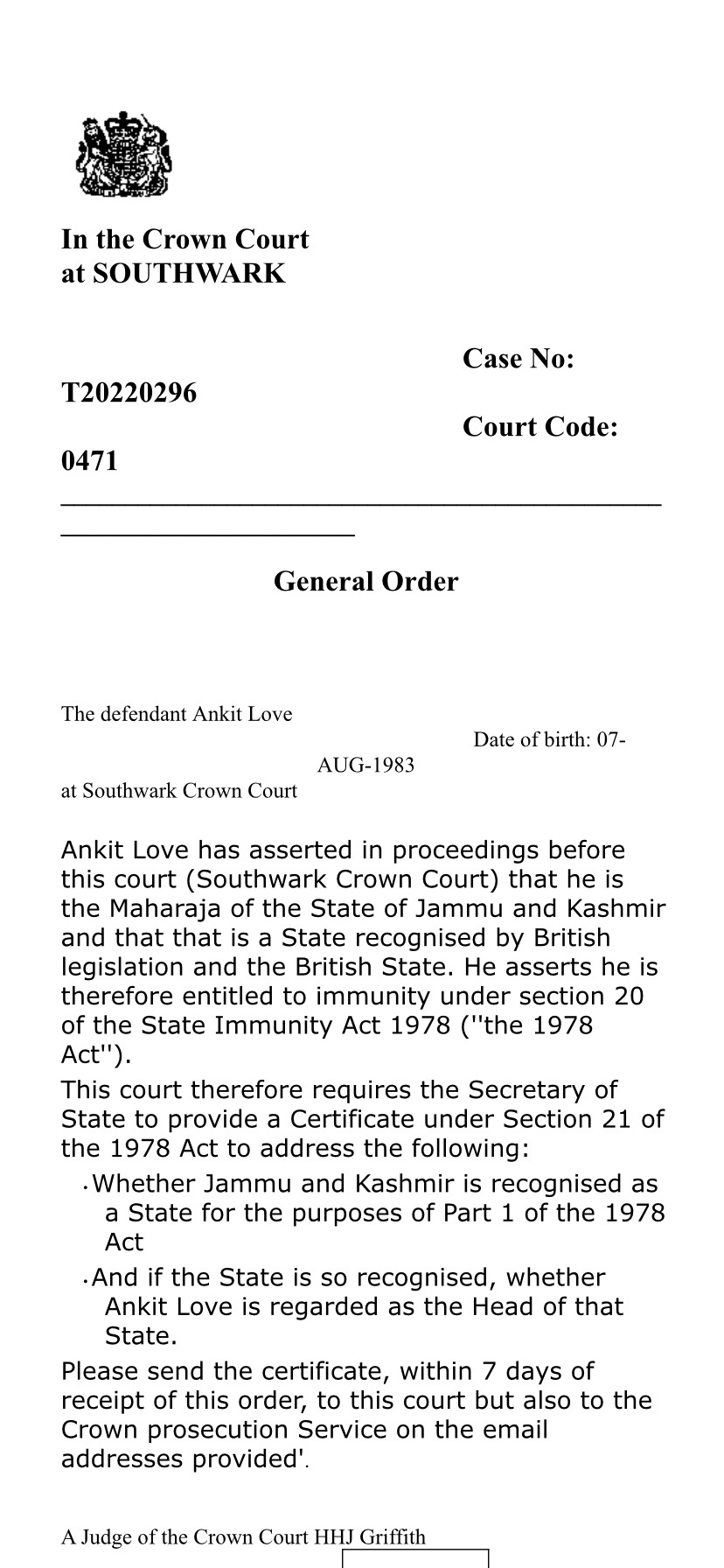
A Crown Court order by circuit judge Martin Griffith against the Foreign Secretary in regards to a certificate of immunity for Ankit Love and Jammu and Kashmir.

=== Advocates ===
Higher rights of audience are required to speak in the Crown Court. This means that only barristers, solicitor advocates, and some chartered legal executives can represent clients.

Solicitors may choose to attend hearings, but they are not able to speak directly.

=== Court staff ===
The court is primarily administered by the Clerk of Court, who wears a white collar/bib with bands and a black gown. They are assisted by the Court Usher, who is the only person that will move when the court is in session and will wear a gown over standard business dress.

=== Court dress ===
Court dress is almost always worn, although wigs may be removed during exceptional circumstances when directed by the judge – for example, when children are testifying.

== Courtroom layout ==
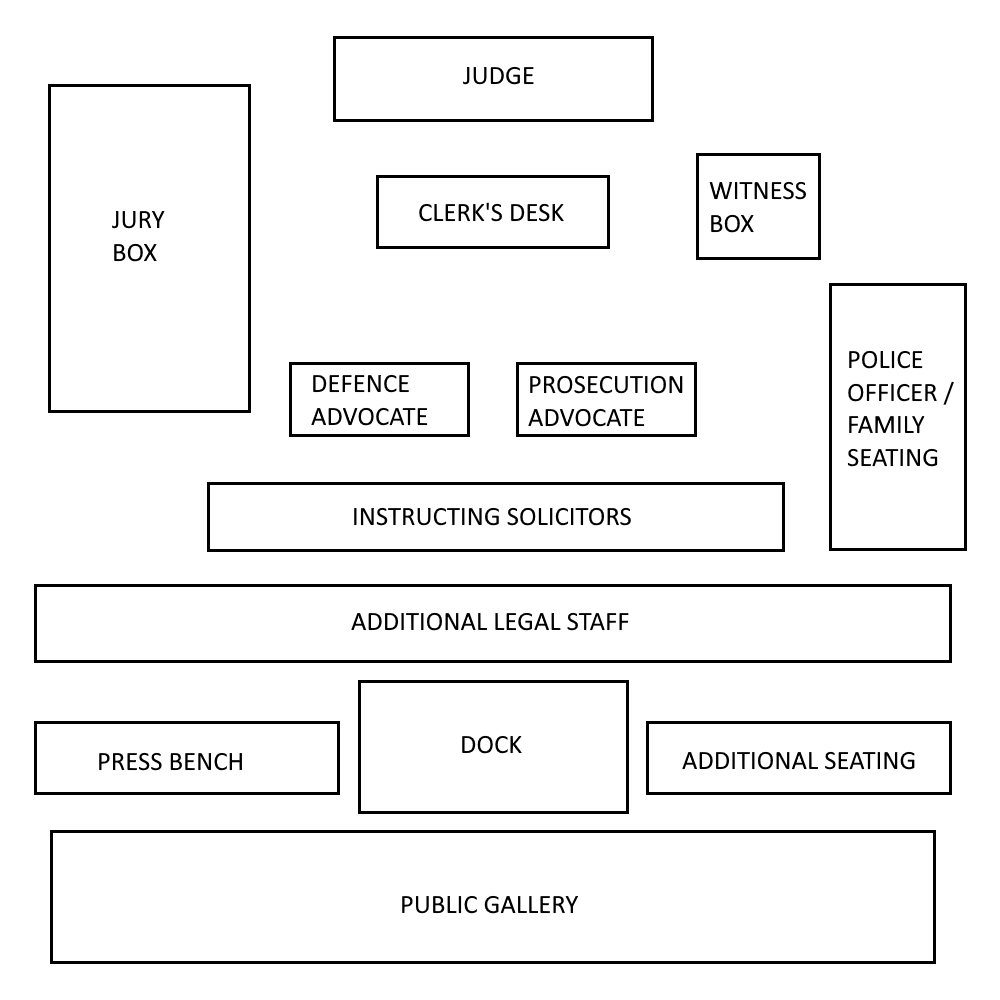
Simplified layout of a typical Crown Court courtroom

There are several physical elements to a Crown Court. From the position of the defendant:

- The judge sits on a large bench at the very back of the court. Above will be a Royal Coat of Arms.
- In front of the judge will be the desk of the Clerk of Court, facing the court. There may also be a desk for the Usher here.
- In front of the Clerk's desk will be the advocates' seating, facing the judge. This may take the form of one long bench or two separate benches, and may even be the same physical desk as the Clerk's. The defence will always sit closest to the jury.
- On one side of the advocates' seating will be the jury box, facing inwards.
- On the other side of the advocates' seating will be the witness stand, facing the jury box. There may be a 'screen' - normally a curtain - to hide the witness from the defendant, to make it easier to testify.
- Behind the advocates' seating will be instructing solicitors' seating.
- Behind the instructing solicitors' seating will be additional seating for paralegals or probation representatives, as well as a bench for authorised press reporters.
- Behind all of this is the dock, a partitioned area for the defendant(s). There will normally be direct access to the court's cells from here, often through a door leading downstairs.
- Behind the dock, and sometimes alongside other seating but facing inwards, will be additional seating for police officers, family, and other people relevant to the case.
- Behind this, or often above on a balcony, will be the public gallery.

Different courts may have different layouts. Some, often older courts may have very compact layouts - like Gloucester Crown Court - or some, often newer courts may be very spacious.

Some courts may have a circular layout, but the overall positioning of elements will remain the same.

== See also ==
- List of courts in England and Wales
- List of Crown Court venues in England and Wales
- United States district court
