= HM Prison Styal =

Women's prison in Styal, England

Coordinates: 53°20′25″N 2°14′21″W

HMP Styal
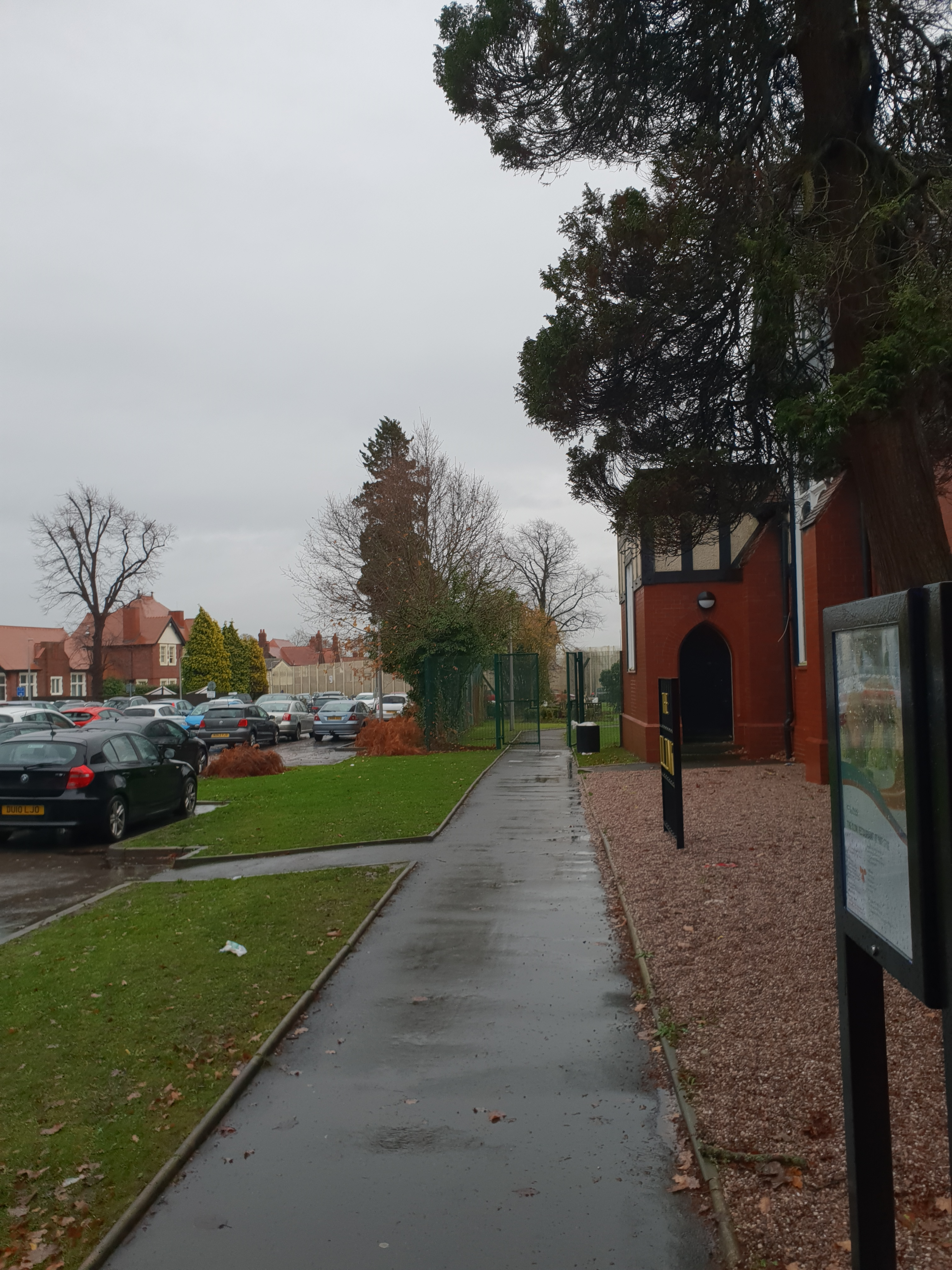
- Interactive map of HMP Styal
- Location: Wilmslow, Cheshire
- Security class: Female/Closed Category
- Population: 486 (February 2017)
- Opened: 1962
- Managed by: HM Prison Services
- Governor: Nicky Hargreaves
- Website: Styal at justice.gov.uk

HM Prison Styal is a Closed Category prison for female adults and young offenders in Styal, Cheshire, England. The prison is operated by His Majesty's Prison Service.

== History ==
The prison occupies former buildings of the Styal Cottage Homes which opened as an orphanage for destitute children from the Manchester area in 1898. It closed in 1956 and the site re-opened as a women's prison in 1962, with women transferred from HMP Manchester.

From 1983 Styal began holding young offenders, and in 1999 a wing was added to accommodate unsentenced female prisoners following the closure of Risley's remand centre. This increased the size of the prison by 60%.

In 2003, Styal Prison was singled out as having one of the worst records for suicides in England and Wales. The Howard League for Penal Reform called for an independent inquiry into the jail, stating that bullying, drugs and overcrowding were probable causes for the high number of deaths.

In 2004, an inspection report from Her Majesty's Chief Inspector of Prisons stated that inmates at Styal Prison were being put at risk by a lack of support during drug withdrawal and with mental health problems. The report also expressed concern about the use of special cells to hold disruptive prisoners, including self-harmers. However, the report did praise the prison's staff–prisoner relations, education provision and resettlement services. The Chief Inspector also said that race relations at Styal were "among the best" she had seen.

An inspection report in 2018 found that the incidence of self-harm was high, but noted that it mainly occurred in a small number of women. The report was positive and particularly praised the prison's strategies for resettling inmates in the community on release. An average of 1.3 deaths from all causes occurred per year in inmates of the prison between 2000 and 2018.

In 2020, a woman serving an eight-month sentence gave birth to a stillborn baby in the prison toilets. Despite having alerted prison staff several times, it took several hours for the woman to receive medical attention, the prison radio system failed when an attempt was finally made to call an ambulance, and no attempts to perform CPR on the baby were made. If the prisoner had received proper medical attention, the baby might have been saved. In 2021, the prison was placed under investigation by the Prisons and Probation Ombudsman.

== Deaths ==
Since 2001, at least 35 women have died at HMP Styal:

Date	Name	Age	Cause of death	Ref.
5 April 2001	Donna Borg	34	Natural causes	
10 August 2002	Nissa Ann Smith	20	Suicide	
26 November 2002	Anna Baker	29	Suicide	
18 January 2003	Sarah Campbell	18	Suicide	
20 April 2003	Jolene Willis	24	Suicide	
4 June 2003	Hayley Williams	41	Suicide	
12 August 2003	Julie Walsh	39	Accidental drug overdose	
10 May 2006	Valerie Hayes	42	Suicide	
19 January 2008	Lisa Marley	32	Suicide	
28 April 2008	Liana White	42	Natural causes	
7 May 2008	Kirsty Davies	32	Natural causes	
8 January 2009	Alison Jane Colk	36	Suicide	
4 December 2009	Denise Williams	53	Natural causes	
21 March 2010	Sally Palmer	42	Natural causes	
27 April 2011	Pamela Bleakeley	28	Natural causes	
8 March 2014	Maureen Wood	67	Natural causes	
29 April 2014	Anita Berry	50	Natural causes	
5 June 2014	Bridget Purcell	45	Natural causes	
23 October 2016	Celeste Craig	26	Suicide	
4 February 2018	Nicola Birchall	41	Respiratory disease	
4 June 2018	Imogen Mellor	29	Suicide	
3 March 2019	Christine MacDonald	56	Suicide	
10 May 2019	Susan Knowles	48	Suicide	
16 April 2020	Shareen Akhtar	41	Respiratory failure	
22 December 2020	Annelise Sanderson	18	Suicide	
2 July 2022	Eileen McDonagh	25	Suicide	
31 July 2022	Rebecca Parkinson	43	Cardiac arrest	
1 August 2023	Rachel Tunstill	32	Breast cancer	
15 December 2023	Laura Parry	59	Unknown	
21 December 2023	Sarah Jackson	46	Unknown	
20 July 2024	Sarah Boyle	35	Suicide	
24 December 2024	Alex Davies	25	Suicide	
27 January 2025	Lorna Carter	58	Heart failure	
9 March 2025	Stephanie Brennan	38	Suicide	
October 26 2025	Lisa Clarke	53	Unknown	

== The prison today ==
Styal is a closed prison for sentenced and remanded female adults and young offenders. There are also facilities for mothers with babies up to age 18 months.

The education provision at Styal is contracted out to The Manchester College. Courses offered include hairdressing, information technology, art and design, ESOL, catering, industrial cleaning, painting & decorating, and Open University support.

Other facilities at HMP Styal include a library, gym and multi-faith chaplaincy.

A visitors centre is available, run by Contact Cheshire Support Group with play area and refreshments. In the main visits hall, facilities include a tea bar and a children's play area (also run by Contact Cheshire Support Group).

There is a restaurant, called Clink, in what was the chapel. This is open to the public and offers training in hospitality and catering to inmates.

== In popular culture ==
The prison was featured in the BBC2 documentary Women on the Edge – the Truth about Styal Prison on 27 February 2006.

== Notable inmates ==
Notable people currently imprisoned or who were imprisoned at HMP Styal include:

- Lauren Jeska, transgender fell-runner convicted of the attempted murder of Ralph Knibbs
- Farzana Ahmed, mother of Shafilea Ahmed, who she murdered in 2003. Sentenced to a minimum of 25 years imprisonment in 2012
- Savannah Brockhill, woman who abused and murdered her female partner's 16-month-old child, Star Hobson. Her case was widely publicised in 2021, shortly after the similarly high-profile child murder of Arthur Labinjo-Hughes by Emma Tustin. Brockhill was sentenced to a minimum of 25 years imprisonment.
- Sarah Williams, given a 25-year minimum sentence in 2016 for the murder of a woman with her friend Katrina Walsh
- Corina Smith, was sentenced to life in prison for killing her husband with a boiling mixture of water and sugar after she was told he had sexually assaulted her two children. She will serve a minimum of 12 years at HMP Styal before she can be considered for parole.
- Mary Bell, stayed from November 1973 to June 1976. She and another girl, Norma Joyce Bell (no relation), had murdered two young boys. Reportedly, Bell resented her transferral to this facility, and while incarcerated at HM Prison Styal, Bell unsuccessfully applied for parole.
- Amanda O'Shaughnessy sentenced to life imprisonment with a minimum term of 14 years for the murder, by stabbing, of her boyfriend David Butterworth.
