= Dan Frazier =

Dan Frazier may refer to:

- Dan Frazier (rugby union)
- Dan Frazier (artist)

== See also ==
- Daniel Frazier, namesake of the destroyer USS Frazier
- Daniel Fraser (disambiguation)
