= HM Prison Foston Hall =

Women's prison in Derbyshire, England

Coordinates: 52.8825°N 1.7254°W

HMP Foston Hall
- Interactive map of HMP Foston Hall
- Location: Foston, Derbyshire
- Security class: Adult Female/Young Offenders
- Population: 299 (August 2020)
- Opened: 1997
- Managed by: HM Prison Services
- Governor: Michelle Quirke
- Website: Foston Hall at justice.gov.uk

HM Prison Foston Hall is a women's closed category prison and Young Offenders Institution, located in the village of Foston in Derbyshire, England. The prison is operated by His Majesty's Prison Service.

== History ==
The original Manor of Foston and Scropton was held by the Agard family from the 14th to the 17th century. It was bought by John Bate in 1679. Richard Bate was High Sheriff of Derbyshire in 1705. Brownlow Bate sold the estate to John Broadhurst in 1784. The 17th century manor house was damaged by fire in 1836, but much survives.

A new Jacobethan house was designed by T. C. Hine of Nottingham and built in 1863. Its main two storey front has eight bays and an off-centre three-storey tower. The house is a Grade II listed building.

HM Prison Service acquired the hall and grounds in 1953. During its Prison Service history, Foston Hall has been a detention centre, an immigration centre and, before its closure in 1996, a satellite of Sudbury Prison. It was re-opened on 31 July 1997, following major refurbishment and building work, as a closed-category female prison.

== The prison today ==
Foston Hall Prison is spread over five wings; C, D, E, F, T and the First Night Centre. A & B were demolished. A wing of temporary accommodation, G Wing, was constructed to isolate prisoners whose roles were vital to the running of the prison (Kitchens, Laundry etc) in case of a severe outbreak of disease. The prison can accommodate both remand and convicted inmates. Foston Hall also has a Health Care Centre.

The prison provides inmates with work in the prison gardens, the gym, the textile and craft workshop and the kitchens, all of which can lead to qualifications. In addition, the prison's education department offers NVQs in Cleaning Services and hairdressing, as well as basic and key skills learning.

== Notable inmates ==
=== Current ===
- Lauren Jeska – fell runner from Lancaster convicted of the attempted murder of Ralph Knibbs, her case attracted attention regarding her gender identity.
- Louise Porton – Woman who murdered her two children in 2018.
- Lorraine Thorpe – Britain's youngest female double murderer at the age of 15. One of those she killed was her own father. She became eligible for parole in 2023.

=== Former ===
- Maxine Carr – Sentenced to three and a half years' prison for lying about her knowledge of the Soham murders.
- Jessica Lynas – contributed to the murder of Gemma Hayter in 2010, which was the subject of the BBC Three documentary Gemma: My Murder
- Karen Matthews – Kidnapper.

== See also ==
- Listed buildings in Foston and Scropton
