= William Tate (MP) =

English Member of Parliament

Sir William Tate (1559–1617) was an English Member of Parliament.

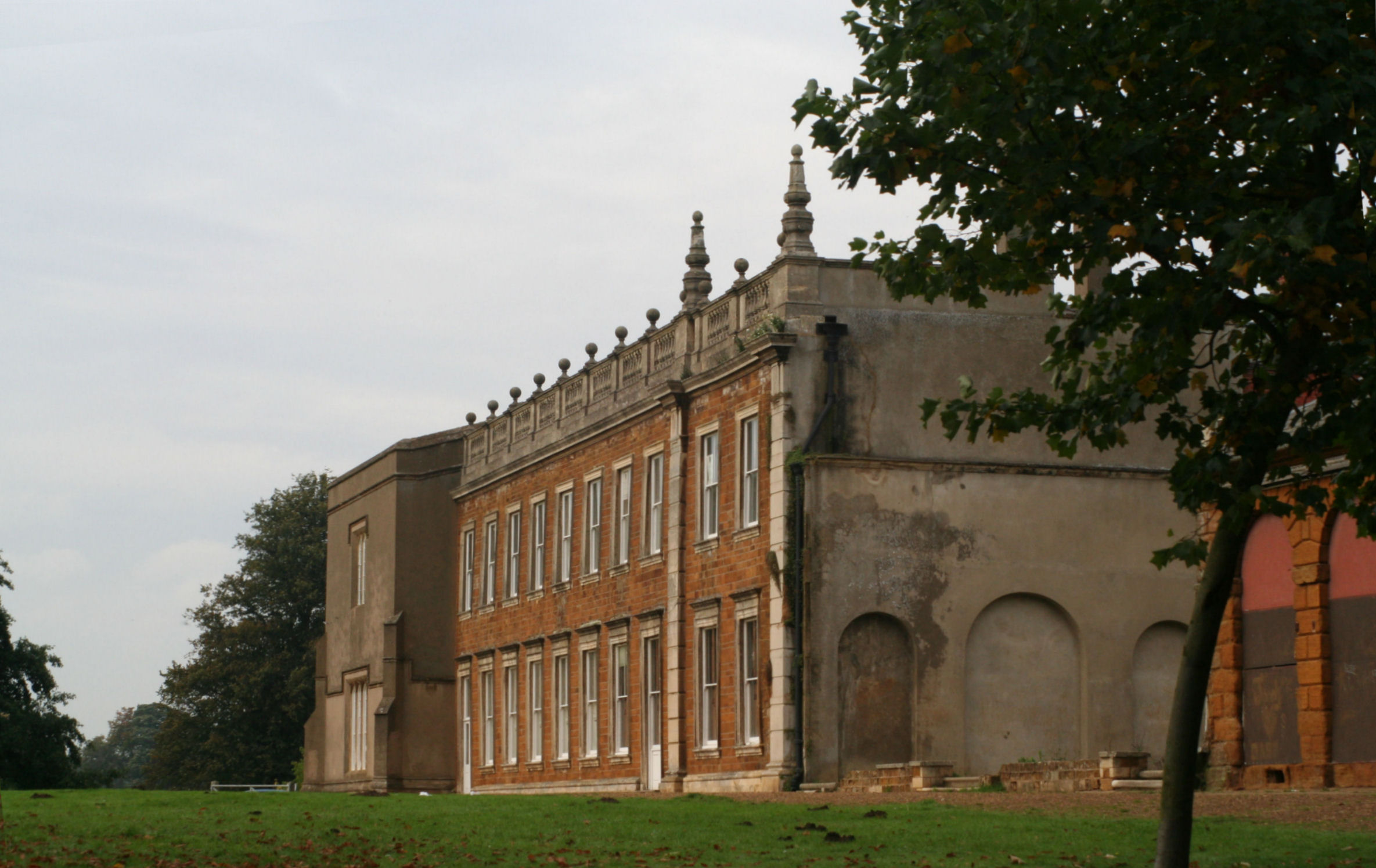
Delapré Abbey, Northamptonshire

== Life ==
The son of Bartholomew Tate of Delapré Abbey, and brother of Francis Tate, he studied at Magdalen College, Oxford, and entered the Middle Temple. He was first in Parliament as member for Corfe Castle, in 1593. He succeeded his father in 1601, inheriting Delapré Abbey.

Tate was an associate of Richard Knightley. He used Delapré Abbey as a centre for local Puritans. He brought the physician John Cotta to the area, from the University of Cambridge, in 1603. In 1607, Cotta and Tate associated in spreading a libel against local opponents.

He was appointed High Sheriff of Northamptonshire for 1603-04 and knighted in 1606. He was elected to Parliament for Northamptonshire in 1614.

== Family ==
Tate married Elizabeth, daughter of Edward la Zouche, 11th Baron Zouche; they had four sons and three daughters, of whom the eldest son was Zouch Tate. Their daughter Elizabeth married Oliver Beecher and was mother to the MP Sir William Beecher. The Zouche title fell into abeyance on the death of the 11th Baron, but was revived in 1815 in favour of the heir of William and Elizabeth.

== Notes ==
Parliament of England
Preceded by Valentine Knightley; Sir Edward Montagu	Member of Parliament for Northamptonshire with Sir Edward Montagu; 1614	Succeeded by Sir William Spencer; Sir Edward Montagu
