= Styal Cottage Homes =

Former village for destitute children in Cheshire, England

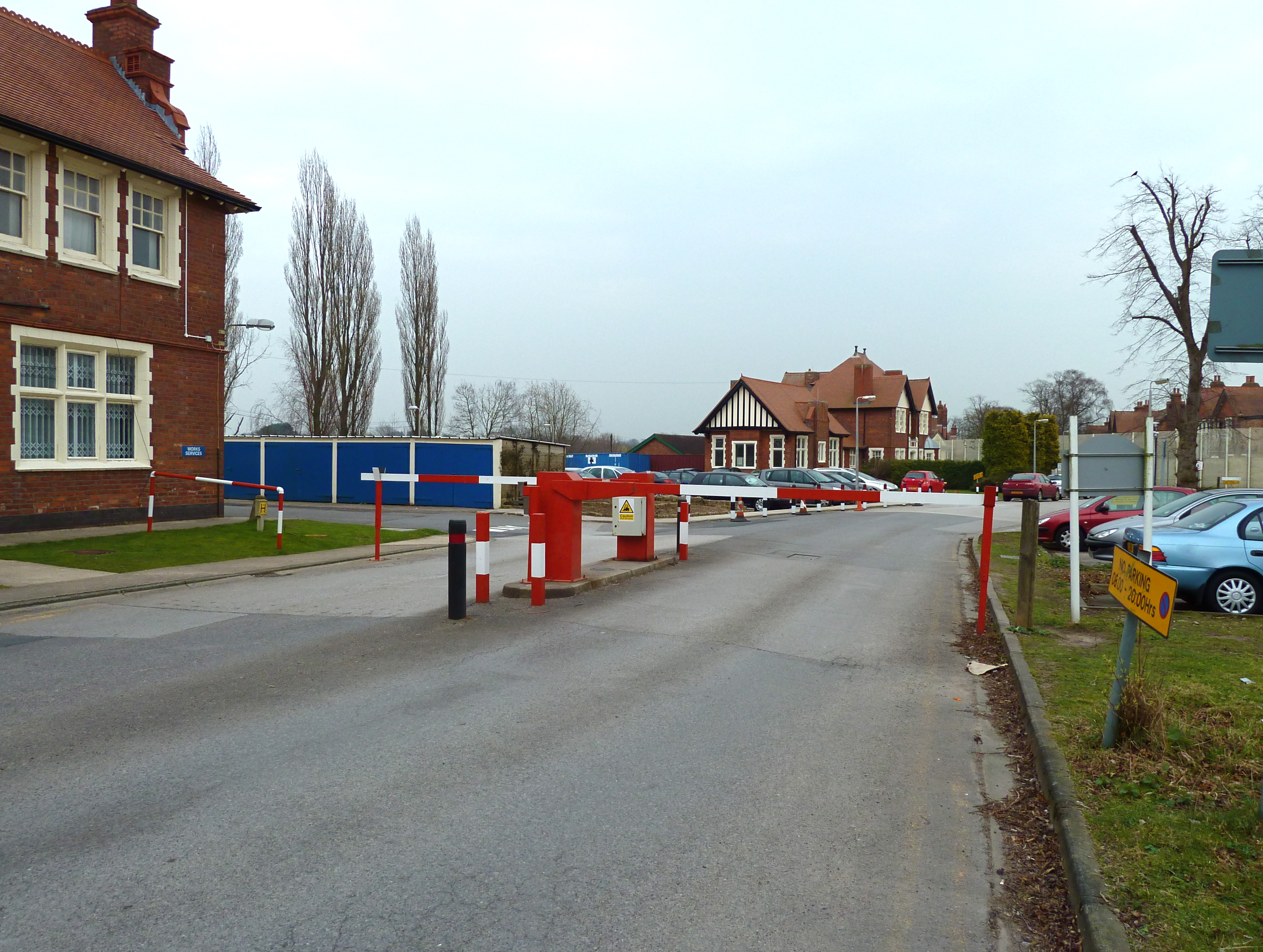

- Location within Cheshire

General information
- Type: Model village
- Location: Styal, Cheshire, United Kingdom
- Coordinates: 53.3403°N 2.2392°W
- Current tenants: HM Prison Styal
- Groundbreaking: 1896
- Completed: 1903
- Opened: 1898
- Closed: 1956

Design and construction
- Architect: James Barritt Broadbent

Styal Cottage Homes, which were open from October 1898 to 1956, housed destitute children from the Manchester area. They were established in Styal by the Chorlton Poor Law Union Board of Guardians, who financed the project with a loan of £50,000 from Liverpool Corporation.

== Construction ==
The foundation stone for the homes was laid on 31 August 1896, by Arthur Balfour, who was then MP for East Manchester. The architect was James Barritt Broadbent of Manchester, who had also worked on schools and workhouses in the Manchester area. Styal Cottage Homes were designed in the form of a model village with 12 homes, each with 20 beds, and four smaller homes with 10 beds each, along with schools and a hospital, erected between 1898 and 1903 at a cost of £60,500. Additional buildings were added in 1905 and in 1928.

== History ==
In 1948 long stay accommodation for 438 children was provided. The children were required to wear uniforms. The establishment was 22 housemothers, 12 assistant housemothers and 18 relief housemothers. Pay for a housemother was £4/2/- for a 48-hour week. £1/3/- was deducted for board and lodging.

Twenty children ran away in one month. There was a farm training school. A 16-horsepower Austin vehicle was provided by the City Council in 1948 to enable sports teams to get to away fixtures. There was a military band, but it was closed in 1948, the same year corporal punishment was abolished. However this was not always the case as it was not unusual for children to be punished if caught talking at night once the lights were off. A slipper was used for this. If children wet their bed they would have to take their sheets to the laundry and wash them by hand, and therefore not attend school. In 1951 it was agreed that the number of children accommodated would be reduced and that cottages should have both boys and girls. Children were to attend outside schools and they were allowed bicycles.

In 1952, as the process of running down the homes progressed the school, farm and bakery closed. 82 children ran away in May. The City Council developed a programme for building family group homes as an alternative.

The last child left in 1956. By that time Manchester had opened 22 family group homes, housing 116 children.

Between December 1956 and September 1959, Styal Cottage Homes were used to house 1100 refugees who had fled Hungary following the failed Hungarian Revolution of 1956. The site was acquired by the Prison Commission (England and Wales) in 1960 and the site re-opened as a women's prison, HM Prison Styal, on 24 October 1962.
