= Mary Ball =

Mary Ball may refer to

- Mary Ball (naturalist) (1812–1898), Irish naturalist and entomologist
- Mary Ball (poisoner) (1818–1849), English housewife who poisoned her husband
- Mary Ball Washington (c.1707–1789), mother of U.S. president George Washington
  - SS Mary Ball, Liberty ship named after Mary Ball Washington
