= Society of Antiquaries =

Society of Antiquaries may refer to:

- Society of Antiquaries of London
- Society of Antiquaries of Scotland
- Society of Antiquaries of Newcastle upon Tyne
- Royal Society of Antiquaries of Ireland
- Elizabethan Society of Antiquaries, 1586–c. 1607
