= Thomas Talbot (antiquary) =

English antiquary

Thomas Talbot (fl. 1580) was an English antiquary.

== Life ==
He was the second son of John Talbot (d. 1551) of Salesbury, Lancashire, by his second wife, Anne, daughter of Richard Banaster of Altham. Before 1580 he had become clerk of the records in the Tower of London, and may be the ‘learned’ Mr. Talbot referred to by Dr. John Dee. He was an original member of the Society of Antiquaries, and occurs in Francis Tate's list of members in 1590. William Camden wrote: ‘Not to conceal my obligations to any, I must acknowledge myself under very great ones to Thomas Talbot, a diligent examiner of records and perfect master of our antiquities’.

== Works ==
None of Talbot's collections are known to have been published. The major ones were left in manuscript in major libraries:

- collections relating to abbeys;
- extracts from chronicles and pedigrees (including that of his own family);
- a collection of historical and constitutional antiquities;
- a collection of abstracts from ‘Inquisitiones post mortem’ relating to Yorkshire families;
- an account of the proceedings of the court of claims at the coronations of Richard II, Henry IV, and Henry V;
- a ‘Catalogus Archicamerariorum Angliæ’;
- collections of pedigrees;
- ‘Collectanea e Rotulis in Turri Lond. servatis’;
- notes from his genealogical collections are extant in Rawlinson MS. B. 103.

Other antiquarian collections, the authorship of which has not been determined, may be by Talbot (cf. Cat. Brit. Mus. Addit. MS. 26717).
