= Murder of Angela Wrightson =

Murder of vulnerable adult by two teenagers in UK

- Wrightson pictured on CCTV in a local shop on the evening she died.
- Location: 54.6897°N 1.2275°W; Hartlepool, County Durham, United Kingdom
- Date: 8 December 2014; 19:30 (GMT)
- Weapon: Various household objects
- Victim: Angela Wrightson

On the night of 8–9 December 2014, 39-year-old Angela Wrightson was beaten to death in her home in Hartlepool, County Durham, England. She was attacked over the course of seven hours by two teenage girls using various household objects. The first trial began in 2015, but was suspended after information about the defendants was circulated on social media. The following year, after a second trial, both girls were found guilty and subsequently given minimum prison terms of 15 years.

== Victim ==
Angela Marjorie "Angie" Wrightson (born 1974 or 1975) was a vulnerable adult who lived on Stephen Street in Hartlepool. Originally from Darlington, she spent her childhood in the care system and reportedly began drinking as a child. Wrightson suffered from alcoholism, and her boyfriend had died from an alcohol-related illness. She had never worked, had 47 criminal convictions and had served a number of prison sentences. Following her last release in 2011, she moved to Hartlepool.

== Attack ==
On the afternoon of 8 December 2014, Wrightson was visited by her landlord at her Stephen Street home and was argumentative and violent, throwing her keys at him multiple times. He left, with her keys, following an argument about purchasing alcohol for her, and described her as drunk but not showing any signs of injuries.

That evening, two teenage girls visited Wrightson's home, a known location for underage drinking. The girls had visited Wrightson to get her to buy alcohol and cigarettes for them; she obliged and was shown on CCTV buying cider at a local shop while the girls remained at her home. The CCTV images showed that Wrightson had no significant injuries at this time; she returned to Stephen Street at approximately 19:30. At some point after this, likely soon after, the girls began subjecting Wrightson to a prolonged (Note: Reports differ to whether the attack lasted up to five or seven hours) beating using weapons such as a shovel, an 18-inch (460 mm) wooden batten driven with screws, and a CRT television. At approximately 21:00, one of the girls posted a photograph on Snapchat, in which Wrightson could be seen with facial injuries. At approximately 23:00, two of Wrightson's friends visited the property in anticipation of drinking with her. After shouting and banging on her window, they found Wrightson's front door unlocked and the living room in a state of "devastation" while the two teenagers and Wrightson hid out of sight. Wrightson's friends left, and some point after this the girls paused the attack while they went to visit a friend. They returned to Stephen Street at approximately 02:00 on 9 December to continue the attack.

Following the attack, the girls left Wrightson on her couch either semiconscious, unconscious, or dead. They left the property at 04:00, and one of the girls texted her carer to come and collect her. With no response, and correctly assuming they would have been reported missing, the girls twice telephoned 999 for a lift home from the police. En route home with the police, the girls posed for a Snapchat photograph with the caption "in the back [of] the bizzie van again".

At approximately 08:45 on 9 December, Wrightson's landlord returned to the house to return her keys. He found her body on the couch; she had sustained 103 injuries of which 80 were to her head.

== Perpetrators ==
At the time of the attack, the girls were aged 13 and 14. Both grew up in physically and emotionally abusive households, both were exposed to parental violence. The girls were resident in the care system; the elder was living in a children's home and the younger with a foster family. Two months before the murder, the elder girl had been arrested for assault on care home workers.

Reviews by two safeguarding bodies, the Teesside Safeguarding Adults Board and the Hartlepool Safeguarding Children Board, reported that both girls engaged in underage drinking and that the younger girl was involved in drug misuse and possible underage sexual activity. The 2017 serious case review reported that the mother of the elder girl was concerned that she was "going to parties, possibly having sexual intercourse" as well as physically assaulting her younger siblings.

== Legal proceedings ==
=== Arrests ===
On 9 December, the elder girl spoke to youth workers and expressed an interest in Wrightson's death as well as prison sentences for murder. The younger girl spoke to friends and was reported to be "quiet and shaking"; she too seemed interested in the case and sent a text message to one friend saying "I might be getting sent down". Cleveland Police launched a murder investigation and both girls were arrested the same day.

=== Trials and convictions ===
Both minors at the time of the offence, the identity of the two teenage girls is protected by the Children and Young Persons Act 1933.

The first trial began in July 2015 at Teesside Crown Court in Middlesbrough, although Justice Henry Globe soon ended the trial when information about the defendants was disclosed and shared on social media. Globe described "an avalanche of prejudicial comment", and the BBC retrospectively described how Justice Globe effectively "ordered media outlets to remove every comment about the trial from any news article and social media post", remove outbound hyperlinks from their websites, and "refrain from issuing or forwarding tweets relating to the trial". It was their opinion that this "effectively meant [they] had to remove all reports of the trial [...] or disable every hyperlink" on the BBC website. Citing public interest, these reporting restrictions were challenged by Associated Newspapers, the BBC, Express Newspapers, Sky News, The Guardian, The Independent, The Mirror Group, The Telegraph, and The Times, although the restrictions were upheld. The case was taken to the Court of Appeal before Lord Justice Leveson, Lady Justice Hallett and Lady Justice Sharp. On 11 February 2016, Leveson granted the appeal but with imposed restrictions: the media may report the retrial but without the use of social media or allowing comments on articles, and they may not report on the legal challenge until the verdicts of the trial had been given.

The same month, the second trial began at Leeds Crown Court; both girls denied murder but the elder admitted manslaughter on the grounds of diminished responsibility. On 6 April, both girls were found guilty of murder, and the following day were sentenced to minimum terms of 15 years' imprisonment.

A hearing on 21 and 22 October 2020 upheld the perpetrators' anonymity. The High Court ruled on 4 February 2021 that both perpetrators should have lifetime anonymity to prevent jeopardising their continued rehabilitation and the risk of self-harm if their identities were revealed. The judgment stated that the event of one of the girls' identities being revealed may lead to "jigsaw identification" whereby the other's identity may be determined. Therefore, both should have anonymity which can be reviewed in the future if there is a material change in circumstances.

== See also ==
- Murder of James Bulger – murder of a toddler by two 10-year-old boys
- Sharon Carr – Britain's youngest female murderer (aged 12)
- Lorraine Thorpe – Britain's youngest female double murderer (aged 15)
