= Bradford Law Courts =

Judicial building in Bradford, England

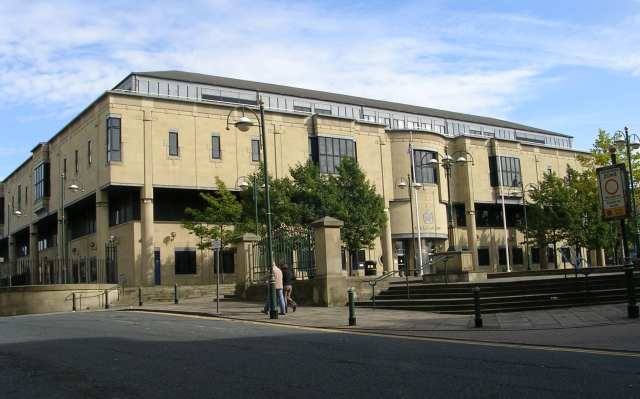
- Bradford Law Courts

- Shown in West Yorkshire
- 53.7927°N 1.7492°W
- Location: Exchange Square, Drake Street, Bradford

History
- Built: 1993

Site notes
- Architect: Napper Collerton
- Architectural style: Modernist style

The Bradford Law Courts is a Crown Court venue, which deals with criminal cases, as well as a County Court venue, which deals with civil cases, at Exchange Square, off Drake Street, Bradford, England.

== History ==
Until the early 1990s, Crown Court cases in Bradford were heard in the Bradford City Hall, or if a long sentence was likely to be given, in Leeds Town Hall. However, as the number of court cases in Bradford grew, it became necessary to commission a more modern courthouse for criminal matters: the site selected had been occupied by the Bradford Exchange railway station which had been demolished in 1976.

The new building was designed by Napper Collerton in the Modernist style, built by John Laing Construction in yellow stone at a cost of £18.9 million, and was completed in 1993. The design involved a symmetrical main frontage of 15 bays facing onto Exchange Square. The central bay featured a revolving door on the ground floor with a curved stone section on the first and second floors, displaying a Royal coat of arms on the first floor and fenestrated by a five-part casement window on the second floor. The wings, of seven bays each, featured sections on the second floor, which were stone-faced and cantilevered out over the pavement. The second floor was fenestrated by tall rectangular windows except for the bays flanking the central bay, which were fenestrated by seven-part oriel windows. Internally, the building was laid out to accommodate eleven courtrooms. The architectural historian, Nikolaus Pevsner, described the design as "expensive-looking and facetiously detailed".

Notable cases have included the trial and conviction, in November 2007, of Ronald Castree for the murder of Lesley Molseed, some 31 years after the trial and wrongful conviction of Stefan Kiszko at Leeds Crown Court in July 1976. They have also included the trial and conviction of eleven men in December 2015, on charges in connection with the Keighley child sex abuse ring, and the trial and conviction, in December 2021, of Savannah Brockhill for the murder of Star Hobson.

In 2017, filming took place at Bradford Law Courts for a court scene in the television drama, The Moorside, which was a dramatisation of the kidnapping of Shannon Matthews.
