= Coventry Combined Court Centre =

Judicial building in Coventry, England

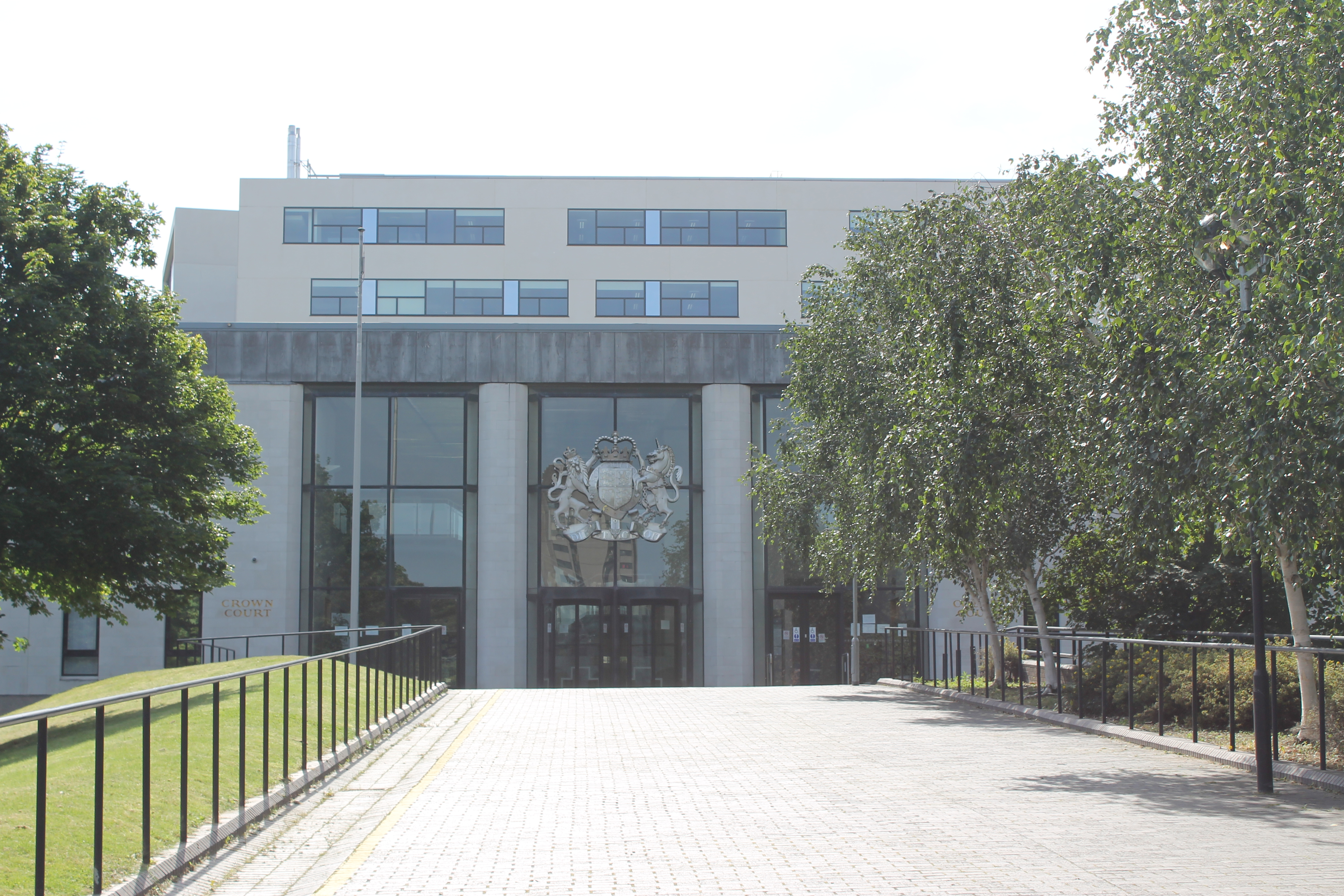
- Coventry Combined Court Centre

- Shown in the West Midlands
- 52.4057°N 1.5062°W
- Location: Much Park Street, Coventry

History
- Built: 1988

Site notes
- Architect: John Madin Design Group
- Architectural style: Modernist style

The Coventry Combined Court Centre is a Crown Court venue, which deals with criminal cases, as well as a County Court venue, which deals with civil cases, in Much Park Street, Coventry, England.

== History ==
Until the late 1980s, the main venue for criminal court hearings in Coventry was the aging County Hall in Cuckoo Street. However, as the number of court cases in Coventry grew, it became necessary to commission a courthouse with dedicated facilities for both Crown Court hearings, which require courtrooms suitable for trial by jury, and for County Court hearings. The site selected by the Lord Chancellor's Department had been occupied by the former works of the Standard Motor Company.

The new building was designed by the John Madin Design Group in the Modernist style, built in concrete and glass at a cost of £5.3 million, and was completed in 1988. The design involved an asymmetrical main frontage of 17 bays facing north towards Earl Street. The central section of three bays was formed by three full height glass openings, approached by a long slope and intended to give access to a large atrium. A Royal coat of arms was installed above the central opening at first floor level. The five bays to the left and the nine bays to the right were fenestrated with tall casement windows on two floors. Internally, the building was laid out to accommodate six courtrooms.

A sculpture entitled "Basilica", which was designed by Paul de Monchaux and made in Purbeck and Portland limestone, and Frankland Grey Granite, and was placed outside the complex in 1991.

Notable cases have included the trial of Emma Tustin and Thomas Hughes, in December 2021, for the murder of Arthur Labinjo-Hughes: Tustin was convicted of murder and Hughes was convicted of manslaughter. They have also included the trial and conviction of Laura Heath, in April 2022, for the manslaughter of her asthmatic son, Hakeem Hussein.
