= John Cotta =

English physician and author (1575–1650)

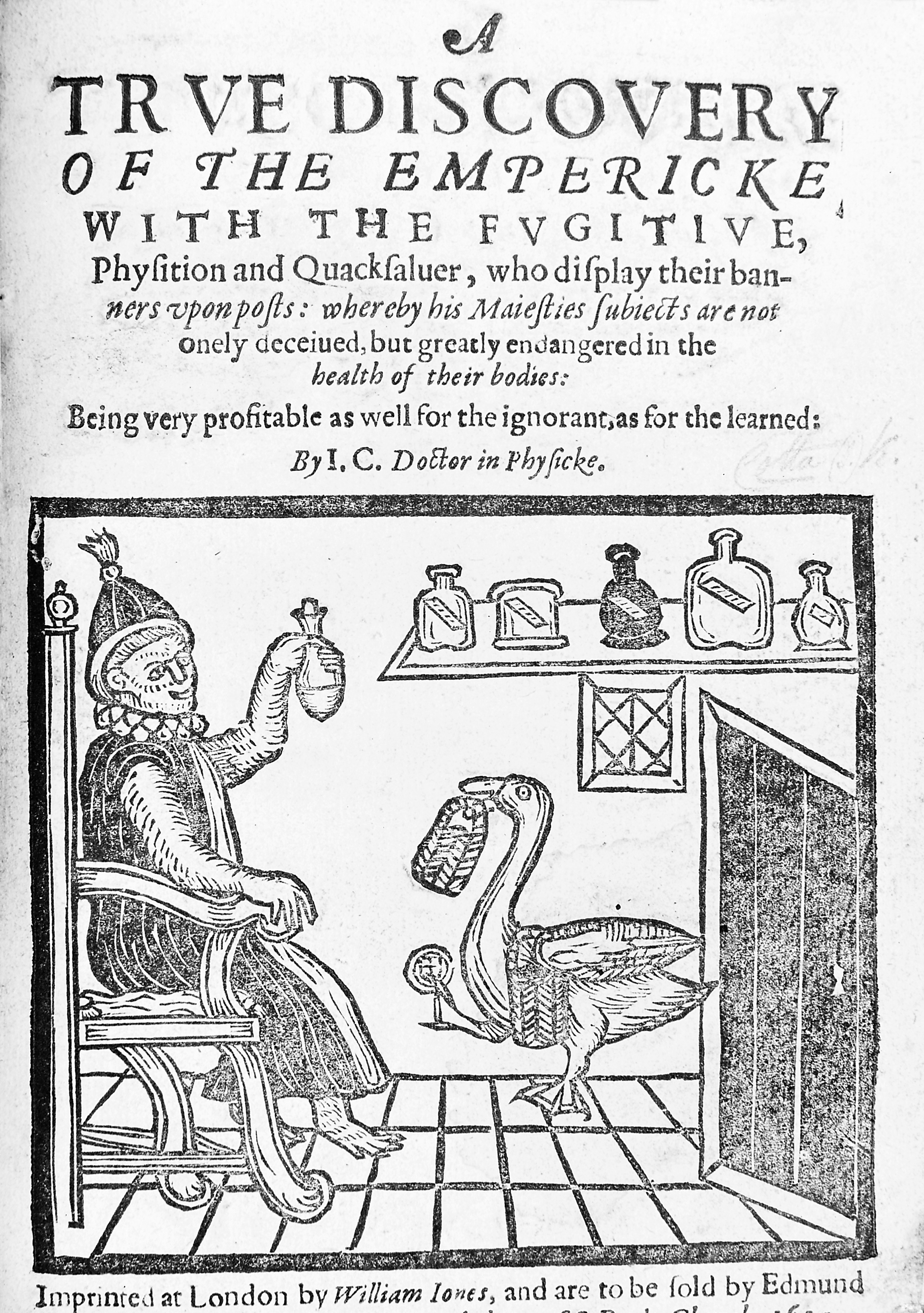
"A True Discovery of the Empericke with the Fugitive Physition and Quacksalver, who Display their Banners upon Posts." Title page, published 1617

John Cotta (1575–1650) was a physician in England and author of books and other texts on medicine and witchcraft.

== Life ==
He was a native of Coventry, and his mother is believed to be Susannah Winthrop, aunt of John Winthrop. In 1590 he was admitted a scholar of Trinity College, Cambridge, and five years later, after taking the B.A. degree, he moved to Corpus Christi College where, in the following year, he proceeded to the M.A. degree. He obtained the M.D. degree in 1603, and then took up residence at Northampton, where, through the patronage and influence of Sir William Tate, he acquired a considerable professional practice.

== Works ==
Cotta wrote extensively about quack doctors, and exposed several in his book Ignorant Practisers of Physicke (1612). He put a traditional Galenist argument, to the effect that experience alone of was of limited value to medical practitioners. With his medical colleague James Hart from Northampton, he argued the case for learned medicine (the early modern tradition descending from Galen) and the requirement of a university degree for its effective use.

He believed in evil spirits, sorcerers and magic. He begins his book The Triall of Witch-craft (1616) by stating that these phenomena were beyond human knowledge, and that only by conjecture and inference is it possible to understand these events. He did warn readers that many suspected witches were really imposters, or unwitting agents of the devil. He presents as evidence that evil spirits exist the standard classical history and biblical texts. He even uses reason to dismiss the "water test" for witches, where a purported witch would be submerged in water, and if she had renounced her baptism and was a true witch, the water would reject her and she would float. Cotta did still agree with others like Reginald Scot that magic was clearly a factor in day-to-day life because many diseases displayed symptoms they could not understand, or did not respond to standard remedies. Also he asserted that eyewitness accounts were sufficient to charge a suspected witch with witchcraft.

Cotta wrote in The Triall of Witch-craft (1616):

Hence as Wítches doe strange and supernaturall workes, and truly vnto reason worthy of wonder; so the Impostor doth things voide of accomptable reason, in shadow, shew, and seeming onely supernaturall, wondred and admired. And hence it commeth to passe, that with vndiscerning mindes, they are sometimes mistaken and confounded . (Note: [See Reginald Scot in his discouerie of Witchcraft, where in regard of the seeming likenesse of Impostures and Witchcraft, erroneously he confoundeth them as one and the selfe-same sinne.]) one for another.

== Nickname in Maine ==
The name "John Cotta" was given as a nickname by early English settlers to an individual of the indigenous peoples they met in the Damariscotta River area in what was to become the state of Maine in the United States. This was because John Cotta was renowned as expert in witchcraft, in the context that it was felt by the settlers that the natives practised a form of religion that could be classed as witchcraft.

== Selected publications ==
- John Cotta. A short discouerie of the vnobserued dangers of seuerall sorts of ignorant and vnconsiderate practisers of physicke in England : profitable not onely for the deceiued multitude, and easie for their meane capacities, but raising reformed and more aduised thoughts in the best vnderstandings: with direction for the safest election of a physition in necessitie: by Iohn Cotta of Northampton Doctor in Physicke, Imprinted [by R. Field] for William Iones, and Richard Boyle dwelling in the Blacke-Friers 1612. Reprinted Walter J. Johnson, Inc., 1972, ISBN 90-221-0445-1
- John Cotta, The triall of witch-craft (The English experience, its record in early printed books published in facsimile), Da Capo Press, 1968, ISBN ~~B0006BWK6A~~
- John Cotta, Cotta contra Antonium: or an Ant-Antony: or an Ant-apology, manifesting Doctor Antony his Apologie for Aurum potable, in true and equal balance of right reason, to be false and counterfait, Oxford: J. Lichfield & J. Sort for H. Cripps, 1623.
- John Cotta, The poysoning of Sir Euseby Andrew: My opinion at the assises in Northampton demaunded in court touching the poysoning of Sr Euseby Andrew more fully ratified. Reprinted by Taylor & Son, 1881~~, ISBN B0008C722E~~
- John Cotta (1616). Triall of Witch-Craft Shewing the True Methode of the Discovery. George Purslowe.; Reprinted January 1968, ISBN 90-221-0039-1
- John Cotta, A true discouery of the empericke with the fugitiue, physition and quacksaluer who display their banners vpon posts: whereby his Maiesties subiects are not onely deceiued, but greatly endangered in the health of their bodies: being very profitable as well for the ignorant, as for the learned: by I.C. Doctor in Physicke., John Cotta, Imprinted at London : By William Iones, and are to be sold by Edmund [Weaver] at the great North doore of S. Pauls Church, 1617.
- John Cotta, A Short Discoverie of Several health, and an vniuersall antidote..., (publication details unknown)

== See also ==
- Medical ethics
- Pseudoscience
