= Collingwood College, Surrey =

Collingwood College

Location
- Kingston Road; Camberley, Surrey, GU15 4AE; England; 51°21′00″N 0°43′17″W

Information
- Type: Academy
- Motto: Believe, Succeed
- Established: c.1971
- Department for Education URN: 136828 Tables
- Ofsted: Reports
- Chair: Steve Barker
- Principal: Karen Watling
- Staff: 203
- Gender: Coeducational
- Age: 11 to 18
- Enrolment: 1686
- Average class size: 32
- Colours: Blue, white and black
- Website: www.collingwoodcollege.com

Collingwood College is a coeducational secondary school and sixth form located in Camberley, Surrey, England.

== Admissions ==
Collingwood is the largest secondary school in Surrey, with over 2,000 students, including more than 400 in the sixth form. It occupies a 30-acre (120,000 m^{2}) campus and is divided in the three main areas: 'Kingston' (Years 10 & 11), 'Barossa' (Years 7–9), and the sixth form centre. This was funded by the sale of land, on which the college's previous sixth form centre (named 'Ballard') was situated. Collingwood College is a DfE designated high-performing specialist academy, specialising in technology and vocational-education.

It is situated north of the A30.

== History ==
=== Earlier school ===
The school derives itself from the Frimley and Camberley County Grammar School, the Bagshot County Secondary School, and the Barossa County Secondary School. In July 1970, Surrey County Council wavered over whether to go ahead with the comprehensive plan.

=== Comprehensive ===
The first Headmaster in 1971 was Mr. Leonard Roe, who had previously been Headmaster of the grammar school. He was followed by Peter Halls-Dickerson, who was an advocate of the idea of direct grant schools. Collingwood was one of the earliest direct grant schools to be created after the passage of the legislation by the then Conservative government. The headmaster from 1974 until the 1990s was Peter Halls-Dickerson.

=== Grant-maintained and Foundation school ===
On 1 September 1991, Collingwood School became Collingwood College, a grant-maintained school. This change of status was overwhelmingly supported by the parents. In 1999, under the new schools' framework, the school adopted foundation status.

In September 1994, Collingwood College became a self-governing technology college. Following the new funding, the school built the Halls-Dickerson Technology Centre ( now called T Block), also one of the first of its kind. As of 1 April 2008, the college was granted high-performing specialist school status. The school also specialises in vocational education, which provides education for working life; such as hairdressing, building and other manual labour based jobs.

Collingwood is a founding member of the Surrey Heath Area Partnership for Education (SHAPE), Surrey's 14–19 network. SHAPE runs diploma courses in IT, for which Collingwood is the lead school and also Society Health and Development. Diplomas are also offered in business and finance and creative media.

=== Academy ===
Previously a foundation school administered by Surrey County Council, in July 2011 Collingwood College converted to academy status.

== Catchment ==
Its catchment area encompasses much of the Surrey Heath area of Camberley, Bagshot, Lightwater, Ascot, Egham, Windlesham, Bisley, Chobham and West End.

== Stabbing and slashing incidents ==
A stabbing took place at the school by Sharon Carr in 1994 when she was just 14 years old. Carr used a knife to stab a fellow pupil, who survived. However, it later came to light that Carr was responsible for the murder of a local hairdresser two years before. Carr is the youngest female to be convicted of murder in the UK.

The school further appeared in the national press following a November 2005 incident in which a student was repeatedly stabbed with a pair of scissors, resulting in one wound above the eye.

The school was also featured on a special programme called "School of Hard Knocks" on ITV that was aired on 6 November 2006. It examined the assault in some detail. The programme criticised the principal for denying that there was a bullying problem at Collingwood. However, an OFSTED report in 2007 reported that there were no serious problems with bullying at Collingwood College.

== Productions ==
Every year Collingwood Productions stage their annual musical. The productions are auditioned in the first two weeks of December, allowing the principals to familiarise themselves with their parts over the holidays. They then return in January to begin the rehearsal process. After the two and a half-month period the shows are staged around the last week of March and normally run for four nights, Wednesday to Saturday.

== Teaching ==
Each year has a Head of Year and Pastoral Assistant, who move up with the students through their years until Year 9 at the school. Each assistant principal is assigned to a year, to take care of other pastoral issues.

All subjects that are taught at the school are assigned a faculty, where the faculty head assists with the running of the subjects, and provides behavioural support to the teachers in their faculty.

== Sixth Form Centre ==
The sixth form was originally housed in the "Ballard" building. Before becoming part of Collingwood School, it had been built for Cordwalles/Cordwallis Boys School, then taken over during the Second World War as Cordwallis MT [Motor Transport] Training Centre for the Auxiliary Territorial Service. It was at this site that Princess Elizabeth trained to drive an Austin K2/Y ambulance as a subaltern. After the war, the building was taken over by the independent Great Ballard School, who occupied it until the 1960s.

In 2005, a new Sixth Form Centre was officially opened by the Countess of Wessex. The Ballard building and its surrounding land was sold, and it was subsequently demolished to be replaced by housing.

The Sixth Form Centre features a modernised architecture, several IT classrooms and a computer suite on the top floor. The centre provides facilities for sixth form students such as a common room and private study area.

== Academic performance ==
Collingwood performs above the national average in attainment 8 at both GCSE and A-Level.

== Notable alumni ==
- Steve Backshall, climber and naturalist.
- Clare Burrage, particle physicist
- Sharon Carr, youngest female killer in Britain, stabbed a fellow pupil at the school in June 1994.
- Dan Frazier, professional rugby player for Newcastle Falcons in RFU Premiership.
- Matt Goss, part of the 1980s pop band, Bros
- Luke Goss, part of the 1980s pop band, Bros
- Jessica Henwick, actress
- Craig Logan, part of the 1980s pop band, Bros
- George Saville, footballer
