= Winchester Law Courts =

Judicial building in Winchester, England

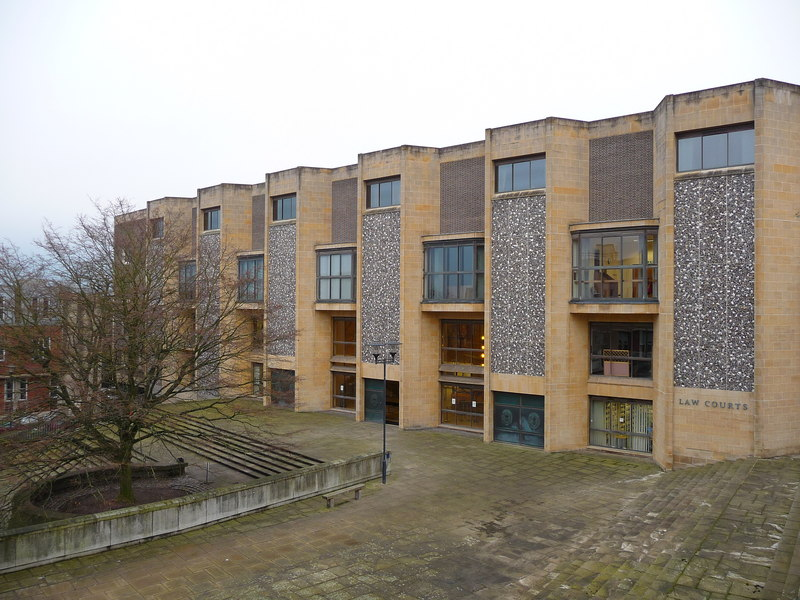
- Winchester Law Courts

- Shown in Hampshire
- 51.0625°N 1.3191°W
- Location: High Street, Winchester

History
- Built: 1974

Site notes
- Architect(s): Louis de Soissons and Richard Fraser
- Architectural style: Modernist style

The Winchester Law Courts is a judicial facility just off the High Street in Winchester, Hampshire, England. As well as accommodating the Crown Court, which deals with criminal cases, the complex also accommodates the County Court and the Winchester District Registry of the High Court.

== History ==
Until the early 1970s, judicial hearings in Winchester were held in the Great Hall of Winchester Castle. However, as the number of court cases in Winchester grew, it became necessary to commission a dedicated courthouse. The site selected by the Lord Chancellor's Department, which was just to the east of the Great Hall, formed part of a larger scheme initiated by Hampshire County Council to form a new civic square, with the proposed law courts to the south, Trafalgar House to the east and Three Minsters House to the north.

Construction of the new building started in 1966. It was designed in outline by Louis de Soissons and in detail by Richard Fraser in the modernist style, built in stone with brick and flint panels at a cost of £2.6 million and was officially opened by the Lord Chancellor, Lord Hailsham, on 22 February 1974. The design involved twelve bays which alternated between (i) stone-cased bays which projected forward and featured flint panels on the lower floors and tripartite casement windows on the top floor (ii) bays which were recessed and featured tri-partite casement windows on the first three floors and brick panels on the upper floors. Internally, the building was laid out to accommodate 15 courtrooms.

Until the mid-1990s, the complex also contained magistrates' courts, and these temporarily returned in 2011 whilst the court buildings in Basingstoke were being refurbished. A sculpture, by Rachel Fenner, recalling elements of the legend of King Arthur was commissioned to celebrate the Diamond Jubilee of Elizabeth II and unveiled in the civic square in front off the courthouse in 2013.

In February 2017, in an attempt to make the criminal justice system less London-centric, the then Lord Chief Justice, Lord Thomas, presided at a sitting of the Court of Appeal at Winchester. Notable cases include the trial and conviction of Rose West, in November 1995, for ten murders, and the trial and conviction of Britain's youngest female murderer, Sharon Carr, for the murder of Katie Rackliff in March 1997.
