= East Manchester =

East Manchester may refer to:

- East Manchester Township, York County, Pennsylvania, United States
- East Manchester, in Manchester, England
  - East Manchester Line
  - The East Manchester Academy

== See also ==
- Manchester East, former UK Parliament constituency
