= Murder of Star Hobson =

2020 murder of a 1-year-old girl in West Yorkshire, England

Star Hobson
- Born: 19 May 2019
- Died: 22 September 2020 (aged 1); Keighley, West Yorkshire, England

Star Hobson (19 May 2019 – 22 September 2020) was a 1-year-old girl who was murdered by her mother's girlfriend on 22 September 2020 in Keighley, West Yorkshire, England.

== Background ==
Star Hobson was born on 19 May 2019. Her parents were Frankie Smith and Jordan Hobson. A teenaged mother, Smith was a month short of her 18th birthday at the time of her daughter's birth. Smith was later found by a clinical psychologist to have a low IQ of 70 and to be highly compliant and subservient and was reported to have played with dolls until the age of 16. In November of that year, Star's parents separated and her mother formed a relationship with Savannah Brockhill, a club bouncer. On 27 January 2020, a friend of Smith's made a referral to social services about Star's welfare. A social worker later visited the baby twice. During February, Brockhill sent a video to Smith's sister speculating that Smith may have cheated on her and calling herself a "psycho" who would "stab someone tonight".

Smith got her own flat at around the time that the UK went into lockdown in March 2020 due to the COVID-19 pandemic. Brockhill was violent towards Smith on at least two occasions during that month and at one point Brockhill told an acquaintance that she had considered driving them both off a cliff. Social services closed their case on Star at about this time but it was reopened in May when her grandmother learned that Brockhill had been using wrestling moves to restrain the toddler with no intervention from Smith. Other referrals, including by Star's father, were made in June and the girl was given a medical examination, but the case was again closed the next month. The case was briefly reopened again after a referral by Star's grandfather but closed when her bruising was explained as being due to a fall. Later that month, CCTV footage captured Brockhill assaulting the child at her workplace in a recycling plant and Smith, who participated in the abuse of her daughter, dragging an unwell looking Star through town on her reins. Star was physically unable to walk by this time due to a broken leg.

== Day of murder ==
On 22 September, Star was playing with two other children at home when she was severely assaulted, according to the later legal verdict through a "fatal punch or kick" delivered with "the force of a car crash". The couple made internet searches related to treating shock in babies 15 minutes prior to making a 999 call. The fatal assault to her abdomen damaged her internal organs, rupturing her vena cava vein, and leading to fatal internal bleeding. She had other, older injuries, which included a fractured ankle and skull.

== Aftermath ==
On 14 December 2021 at Bradford Crown Court, Savannah Brockhill was convicted of murdering Star Hobson while Frankie Smith was found guilty of causing or allowing her death. Brockhill was sentenced to life imprisonment with a minimum of 25 years while Smith was sentenced to eight years, which was later increased to 12 years by the Court of Appeal.

The trial related to the case of Star Hobson took place at a similar time to the one related to the murder of Arthur Labinjo-Hughes, another young child who was abused and killed by carers. Several parallels were noted between the cases such as both children being killed by their parent's new partner, having extended family who tried to help them and being of known concern to the authorities. Additionally, both were murdered during the COVID-19 pandemic which arguably made it easier for their worsening condition to be hidden from others.

== See also ==
- Louise Porton – British woman who murdered her two daughters in 2018
