= Listed buildings in Foston and Scropton =

Foston and Scropton is a civil parish in the South Derbyshire district of Derbyshire, England. The parish contains seven listed buildings that are recorded in the National Heritage List for England. All the listed buildings are designated at Grade II, the lowest of the three grades, which is applied to "buildings of national importance and special interest". The parish contains the village of Scropton, the hamlet of Foston, and the surrounding area. The listed buildings include a church, a cross in the churchyard, and the lychgate and churchyard walls, and the other listed buildings are houses and associated structures.

== Buildings ==
Name and location	Photograph	Date	Notes
Churchyard cross 52.86871°N 1.71490°W		Medieval	The cross in the churchyard of St Paul's Church is in sandstone. It consists of a plain square base, and the lower part of a shaft with chamfered angles.
The Old Hall; 52.86908°N 1.71402°W		17th century	A timber framed cottage with brick infill, partly encased in brick, and with a tile roof. There is a single storey and attics, a front of two bays, and an outshut. The doorway has a hood, the windows are casements, and inside is a large inglenook fireplace.
Broomhill; 52.89136°N 1.72866°W	—	Early 18th century (possible)	The farmhouse is in red brick with a dentilled eaves cornice and a tile roof. There are two storeys and attics, a front of three bays, and a single-storey bay on the left. On the front is a gabled open porch, and the windows are casements with segmental heads. Inside there are two inglenook fireplaces.
St Paul's Church, Scropton; 52.86886°N 1.71490°W		1855–56	The church, which was designed by Benjamin Ferrey in Decorated style, is built in sandstone with tile roofs. It consists of a nave, a south porch, a chancel with a lean-to vestry and a west tower. The tower has a west doorway above which are lancet windows, two-light bell openings, and a pyramidal roof. The east window has three trefoiled lancets, with trefoils and quatrefoils above.
Lychgate and churchyard walls, St Paul's Church; 52.86886°N 1.71490°W		1855–56	The lychgate and walls were designed by Benjamin Ferrey, and are in sandstone. The lychgate has a timber superstructure, an overhanging tile roof, and a cross finial. The walls completely enclose the churchyard and have chamfered copings, and the gate piers have chamfered caps.
Foston Hall, archway and gates 52.88202°N 1.72531°W	—	1863	A large house designed by T. C. Hine in Jacobethan style, and later used as a prison. It is in red brick with blue brick diapering, stone dressings, quoins, moulded bands, and tile roofs with coped gables and moulded kneelers. There are two storeys, a three-storey tower with iron cresting and a weathervane, and an irregular west front with eight bays. The round-arched doorway is flanked by windows, all enclosed in Tuscan pilasters. Most of the windows are sashes with moulded surrounds, and on the front are canted bay windows, a Venetian window in a shaped gable, and two gabled dormers. Attached to the house is an archway from the previous house with a rusticated front and brick at the rear, fluted capitals, and wrought iron gates.
Stable Block, Foston Hall; 52.88341°N 1.72648°W	—	1905	The stable block, later used for other purposes, is in Jacobean style. It is in red brick with stone dressings, and a tile roof with a central clock turret, and a bell cupola with a weathervane. The building is in a single storey, and encloses four sides of a courtyard. The west front is symmetrical with nine bays, and has a central carriage entrance with Tuscan columns and a frieze with triglyphs and lozenges, over which is an open pedimented gable with a coat of arms and the date. The outer bays contain cross windows, and the end bays project with shaped gables, and contain mullioned and transomed windows.
