= Arthur Agarde =

English antiquary and archivist

- Born: 1540; Foston, Derbyshire
- Died: 1615 (aged 74–75)
- Occupation(s): Deputy-chamberlain and antiquary

Arthur Agarde or Agard (1540 – August 1615) was an English antiquary and archivist in the Exchequer at Westminster.

== Career ==
Agard was born in 1540 in Foston, Derbyshire. He was trained as a lawyer, but entered the Exchequer as a clerk.

On the authority of Anthony Wood, it has been stated that he was appointed by Sir Nicholas Throckmorton to be deputy-chamberlain in 1570, and that he held this office for forty-five years, first informally, before he gained formal appointment in 1603. In this capacity, he was responsible for what would be a 40-year project to compile inventories of the four treasuries at Westminster, which contained both royal and abbey records. This was an ideal place to pursue his antiquarian interests and he was one of the original members of the Society of Antiquaries. The documents in his care at Westminster included Domesday Book, kept under special protection in his office. Agard also mentioned the "ancient registers and books which have fallen into my hands" and, to judge by the range he cited in his varied contributions to the Society of Antiquaries' discussions, this material was diverse. Society members consulted Agard for advice on what material might be available.

Thomas Hearne, in his Collection of Curious Discourses written by Eminent Antiquaries (Oxford, 1720 first edition, but extended second edition published in 1773), includes six essays by Agard, titled as follows:

- Opinion touching the Antiquity, Power, Order, State, Manner, Persons and Proceedings of the High-court of Parliament in England
- Of What Antiquity Shires were in England?
- On the dimensions of the lands of England
- The Authority, Office, and Privileges of Heralds in England
- Of the Antiquity and Privileges of the Houses or Inns of Court, and of Chancery
- Of the diversity of names of this island

The discussion on the dimensions of land, on 24 November 1599, gives an insight into Agard's research methods:

Although I must confess that in this proposition I have more travelled than in any of the former, for that it concerneth me more to understand the right thereof, especially in that sundry have resorted to me thereabouts to know whether I have in my custody any records that avouch the same in certainty; yet so it fareth with me, that in perusing as well those abbreviations I have noted out of Domesday and other records …, as also those notes I have quoted out of ancient registers and books which have fallen into my hands within these xxx. years, I have found the diversity of measurement so variable and different in every … place in the realm, as I was in a mammering … .

Agard, among the royal and Westminster Abbey archives, was not short of charters; he also had a private collection, including the Chertsey Abbey cartulary. Few people at this time had any understanding of Old English. In the 1591 shire discussion, Agard shows no sign of understanding the language; but over the following decade he tried to rectify this by compiling a glossary, as he explained when discussing the etymology of the word "steward" in 1603: "I take it to be derived from the Saxon, the later sillable ward, signifying watchfull or carefull over any thing; for soe … I fynd it expounded by an old booke of Canterbury [out of which I wrote the exposition of sundry Saxon words by alphabet]."

He also wrote a large work on Domesday Book titled Tractatus de usu et obscurioribus verbis libri de Doomsday ("A treatise on the use and meaning of obscure words in Domesday Book"), as well as a guide book for his successors in office containing a catalogue of the records of the Treasury and an account of treaties with foreign nations.

Agard died between 22 and 24 August 1615, when almost 80, and was buried in the cloister of Westminster Abbey, on his tomb being inscribed Recordorum regiorum hic prope depositorum diligens scrutator. He bequeathed to the Exchequer all his papers relating to that court, and to his friend Sir Robert Cotton his other manuscripts, amounting to twenty volumes, most of which are now in the British Library. His manuscripts can be identified by the presence of a buglehorn stringed, together with the motto “DIEU ME AGARDE” on the decorated bindings.

== Personal life ==
Agard married, sometime after 8 February 1570, Margaret, daughter of George Butler of Sharnbrook, Bedfordshire. She died in 1611, as the monument he raised to her in the cloister of Westminster Abbey states. They had no children, and his nephew William Agard became his executor and residuary legatee, though he bequeathed many of his manuscripts elsewhere.

== Sources ==
- Martin, G. H. (2008) [2004]. "Agard, Arthur (1535/6–1615)". Oxford Dictionary of National Biography (online ed.). Oxford University Press. doi:10.1093/ref:odnb/206. (Subscription or UK public library membership required.)
