= Foston, Derbyshire =

Hamlet in Derbyshire, England

Coordinates: 52.8836°N 1.7209°W

Foston
- Location within Derbyshire
- OS grid reference: SK188318
- Civil parish: Foston and Scropton
- District: South Derbyshire
- Shire county: Derbyshire
- Region: East Midlands
- Country: England
- Sovereign state: United Kingdom
- Post town: Derby
- Postcode district: DE65
- Dialling code: 01283
- Police: Derbyshire
- Fire: Derbyshire
- Ambulance: East Midlands
- UK Parliament: South Derbyshire

Foston is a hamlet in the Foston and Scropton civil parish of South Derbyshire, Derbyshire, England, about 12 miles (19 km) west of Derby and 8 miles (13 km) east of Uttoxeter. The Domesday Book of 1086 lists it as Farulveston.

== Foston Hall ==
Foston Hall is a brick Jacobethan house designed by the architect T.C. Hine and built in 1863. It is now a women's prison that can accommodate over 170 inmates. Foston is visible from Sudbury open prison.

== Economy and amenities ==
JCB has a manufacturing plant here concerned with power systems. Other major employers who have a base in Foston include Futaba UK Ltd, ATL Warehousing & Logistics and Truma UK.

Children who live in Foston are likely to go to John Port Spencer Academy.

== Notable residents ==
Arthur Agarde, antiquarian, was born here in 1540.

== Road ==
The A511 terminates in this hamlet, but the A50, passes. The A511 road is useful to the villages of Hatton and Tutbury, and to the town of Burton upon Trent, and to the county of Leicestershire.

== See also ==
- Foston Hall
- List of places in Derbyshire
- Listed buildings in Foston and Scropton
