= Louise Porton =

British double murderer

- Born: 1996 (age 29–30)
- Penalty: Life imprisonment with a minimum tariff of 32 years imprisonment

Details
- Victims: 2
- Span of crimes: 15 January 2018 – 1 February 2018
- Country: United Kingdom
- Imprisoned at: HM Prison Foston Hall

Louise Porton (born 1996) is a British double murderer who came to public attention in 2019 when she was convicted of murdering her two children as they "got in the way" of her sex life. Between 2 January and 1 February 2018, she repeatedly attacked and then killed her two daughters, one aged three years and the other aged 17 months. Suspicions soon fell on her when she was noted to show little concern at the unexplained deaths of her two children only 18 days apart, and a police investigation found that she had made a number of incriminating Internet searches at the time attempting to find out how to successfully murder her children and cover up her crimes. At trial, she was convicted by unanimous jury decision and sentenced to a minimum of 32 years' imprisonment. She is imprisoned at HM Prison Foston Hall.

== Background ==
At the time of the murders, 22-year-old Porton and her children, 3-year-old Lexi and 17-month-old Scarlett, lived in Beechwood Court in Rugby, Warwickshire. Between August 2016 and November 2017, they lived at an address in Willenhall near Walsall, where the landlady spent "more and more time" caring for the children as Porton socialised instead of looking after them. The landlady later testified that Porton would do "whatever she could not to have them with her". Porton claimed to be a model and spent a large amount of time on dating apps and offering men sexual services for money. The children's father did not have contact with them and had never met Scarlett. Porton would later admit she found that parenting was "not one of the easiest things to do".

== Murders ==
=== Lexi Draper ===
In January 2018, Porton's daughter Lexi Draper was admitted to hospital several times for illnesses which doctors could not explain. She was first taken to hospital on 2 January suffering from breathing difficulties, before being taken again on 4 January, both times being saved only by the work of paramedics. Her symptoms were consistent with deliberate airway obstruction, but doctors at the time did not consider this suspicious and believed that her condition arose from a chest infection. While her daughter was in hospital, Porton showed little concern for her child, sending nude photographs to a photographer from the toilets in the hospital and offering sex acts in return for money.

On 15 January 2018, Porton called 999 reporting her daughter was ill again. When the operator asked if the girl was breathing, Porton simply replied "no". When help arrived, it was found that Lexi had been long dead before her mother had even reported her unwell. Despite the girl's death, Porton again showed little concern about her daughter, spending the next day accepting 41 friend requests on the dating app Meet Me and also messaging men on another app, Badoo. She messaged one man "my little girl passed away yesterday" as they chatted about tattoos. She also spent the day arranging to meet with men. A couple of weeks after her daughter's death Porton was heard laughing in the funeral parlour by the funeral arranger, who said she saw her using FaceTime speaking to a man.

=== Scarlett Vaughan ===
Only 18 days after Lexi had died, and only two days after Porton was heard laughing at the funeral parlour, Porton's 17-month old other daughter suddenly and inexplicably died. Porton had called 111, the non-emergency NHS line, reporting that her daughter was unwell, yet despite claiming she thought the condition "did not seem urgent", the toddler was found dead and "completely lifeless" by the time paramedics arrived 9 minutes later. It was again discovered that the child had been dead for some time before Porton had called for help. Doctors again found that the death was consistent with deliberate airway obstruction and Porton again showed little concern at the sudden and unexplained death.

Doctors could not find any natural reason why either of the children, let alone both, had died. Porton claimed Scarlett had the flu.

== Investigation ==
Suspicion soon fell on Porton, and police then discovered that she had made a series of incriminating internet searches throughout the month of January that indicated she had killed her children and attempted to cover it up. It was found that she had searched about death, breathing, and drowning when she had originally admitted Lexi to hospital on 2 and 4 January, and also researched how long it took for bodies to go "cold up to the shoulder". After Lexi was then successfully treated and discharged, Porton searched "can you actually die if you have a blocked nose and cover your mouth with tape" and "how long after drowning can someone be resuscitated?". She also read an article entitled "Toddler brought back to life after nearly drowning". Police said it was clear from the evidence that Porton had twice tried to kill her daughter before eventually succeeding on 15 January. The evidence heavily indicated that the two children had died as a result of someone deliberately interfering with their breathing and that person could only have been Porton.

== Trial and conviction ==
"These were blameless young children who were plainly vulnerable and ought to have been able to rely on their mother to protect and nurture them. Instead you took their young lives away."

— Porton's trial judge when sentencing her at Birmingham Crown Court, 2 August 2019

Porton was brought to trial in 2019 for both of the murders and found guilty by unanimous jury decision. The judge described Porton's actions as "evil" and "calculated", and said she was sure Porton had been responsible for events leading to Lexi's earlier admissions to hospital on 2 January and on 4 January when her life was saved only by skilled resuscitation by paramedics. The judge also noted that Porton had then only called emergency services when she knew her daughters were dead, saying that "I am left in no doubt that you delayed calling for an ambulance until you were sure she was dead and could not be resuscitated.". It was concluded that Porton had killed the children because they had "got in the way" of her sex life. She was given a minimum tariff of 32 years imprisonment. She showed no remorse for her actions.

=== Reaction ===
The conviction of Porton received significant press coverage both in the UK and abroad, the media noting her callousness in killing her children only because of her sex life. Warwickshire County Council and the Warwickshire Safeguarding Board said that a serious case review would be commissioned following the deaths of the two children.

The children's father, Chris Draper, released a statement saying he was "broken", commenting:

Why did Louise do something so evil to our beautiful daughters? You are their mother, the person supposed to care for them, protect and love them. They were just an inconvenience to you; how could you do this? I sit and think day and night and I can't understand why my two little girls were taken away because Louise wanted to sleep around.

== Subsequent events and lasting notoriety ==
Porton is imprisoned at HM Prison Foston Hall. In December 2019, soon after she was convicted, there was controversy when it was reported that Porton would receive "three Christmas meals" in prison.

In February 2020, Porton's mother, who had reportedly been "tormented" over the deaths of her grandchildren and had disowned her daughter, was found dead. The death was not considered suspicious and was believed to be a suicide.

Porton's case was featured in a January 2021 book by Richard Taylor, titled The Mind of a Murderer: A Glimpse Into the Darkest Corners of the Human Psyche, from a Leading Forensic Psychiatrist.

Porton's case has been referenced in a number of academic journals focused on female murderers and the media response to Porton's case. In May 2022, her case was discussed in The British Journal of Social Work, in an article titled "'Social Workers Failed to Heed Warnings': A Text-Based Study of How a Profession is Portrayed in UK Newspapers". Also in May 2022, Porton was the subject of an article in the Journal of Concurrent Disorders, titled "Analysing the discursive psychology used within digital media to influence public opinions concerning female child-killers".

== See also ==
- Emma Tustin
- Maxine Robinson – fellow female UK multiple child killer
- Rekha Kumari-Baker
- Lorraine Thorpe – another young female double killer imprisoned with Porton at HM Prison Foston Hall
- Sharon Carr
