= Zouch Tate =

English Member of Parliament

Zouch Tate (1606–1650) was an English Member of Parliament.

== Life ==
He was the son of Sir William Tate and Elizabeth, daughter of Edward la Zouche, 11th Baron Zouche, and nephew of Francis Tate. He matriculated on 26 October 1621 at Trinity College, Oxford, and entered the Middle Temple in 1625.

Tate represented Northampton in the Long Parliament, and swore the Solemn League and Covenant. In November 1644, he was appointed chairman of a committee to investigate Cromwell's accusations against the army, and on 9 December 1644 he moved the Self-denying Ordinance in the House of Commons, proposing that no member of the Lords or Commons should hold any military or naval command.

A speech delivered on 30 July 1645 was printed in Observations on the King and Queen's Cabinet of Letters, 1645. Although not one of those members excluded by Pride's Purge in December 1648, he is not recorded as having sat afterwards. He died in 1650.

== Notes ==
Attribution

This article incorporates text from a publication now in the public domain: "Tate, Francis". Dictionary of National Biography. London: Smith, Elder & Co. 1885–1900.
