= Daniel Fraser =

Daniel Fraser may refer to:

- Daniel Fraser (actor), British actor
- Daniel R. Fraser (1851–1920), politician from Edmonton, Alberta, Canada
- Daniel Fraser (engineer) (1787–1849), Scottish-born engineer in Sweden
- Daniel Fraser (rugby) (fl. 1902–1909), New Zealand rugby league international
- Dan Fraser (born 1963), Canadian media executive

== See also ==
- Dan Frasier, American football coach
- Dan Frazier (rugby union) (born 1988), English rugby union player
- Dan Frazier (artist), (born 1945), American artist
- Daniel Frazier (c. 1785–1833), U.S. sailor
- Paul Frazier (1967–2018), American football player born Daniel Frazier
