= County Hall, Coventry =

County building in Coventry, England

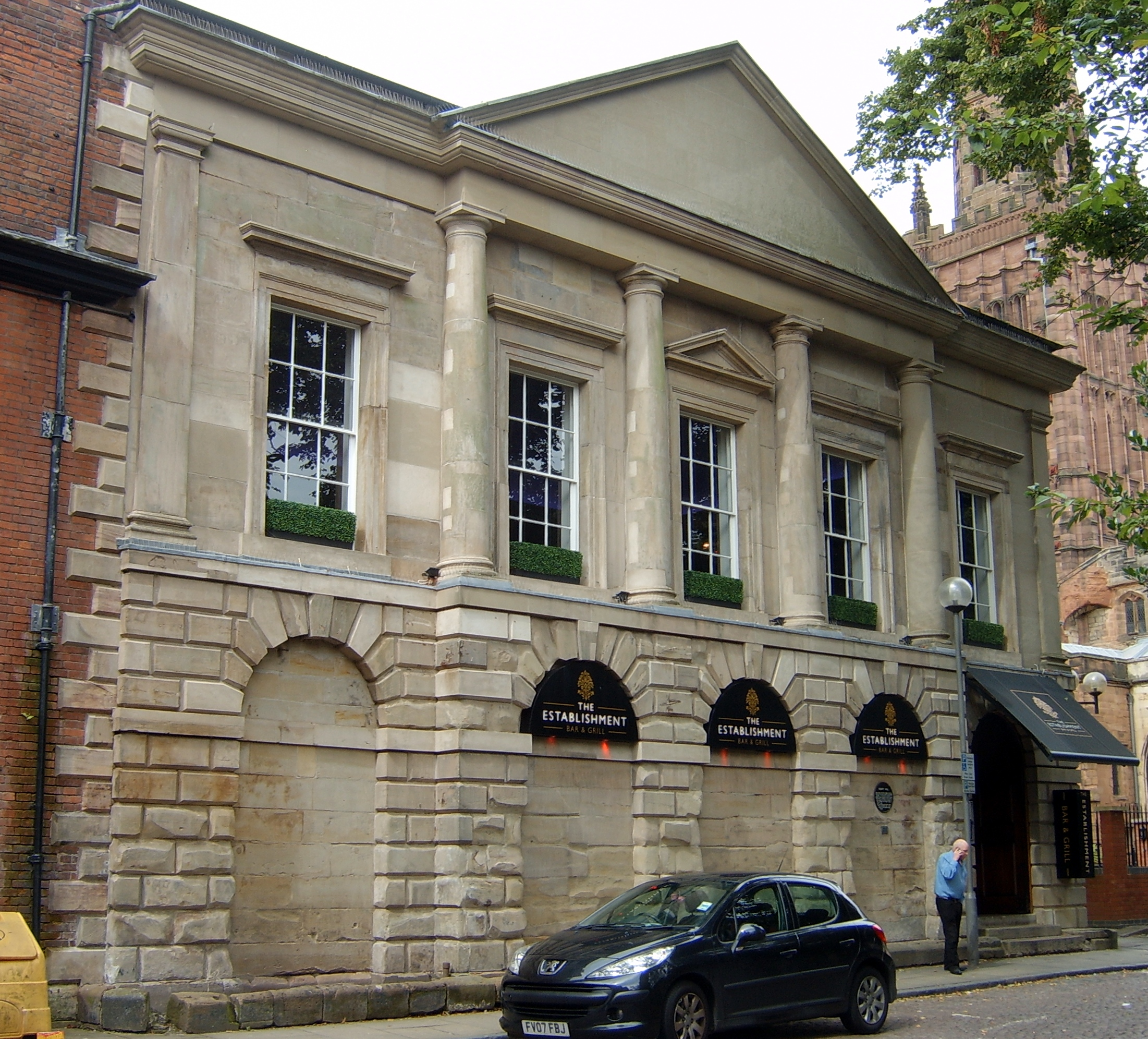
- County Hall on Cuckoo Lane is now a bar

- Shown in the West Midlands
- 52.4080°N 1.5086°W
- Location: Cuckoo Lane, Coventry

History
- Built: 1783

Site notes
- Architect: Samuel Eglinton

Listed Building – Grade II*
- Official name: County Hall, Coventry
- Designated: 24 June 1974
- Reference no.: 1076642

County Hall is a historic former courthouse in Cuckoo Lane in Coventry's Cathedral Quarter. It is a Grade II* listed building.

== History ==
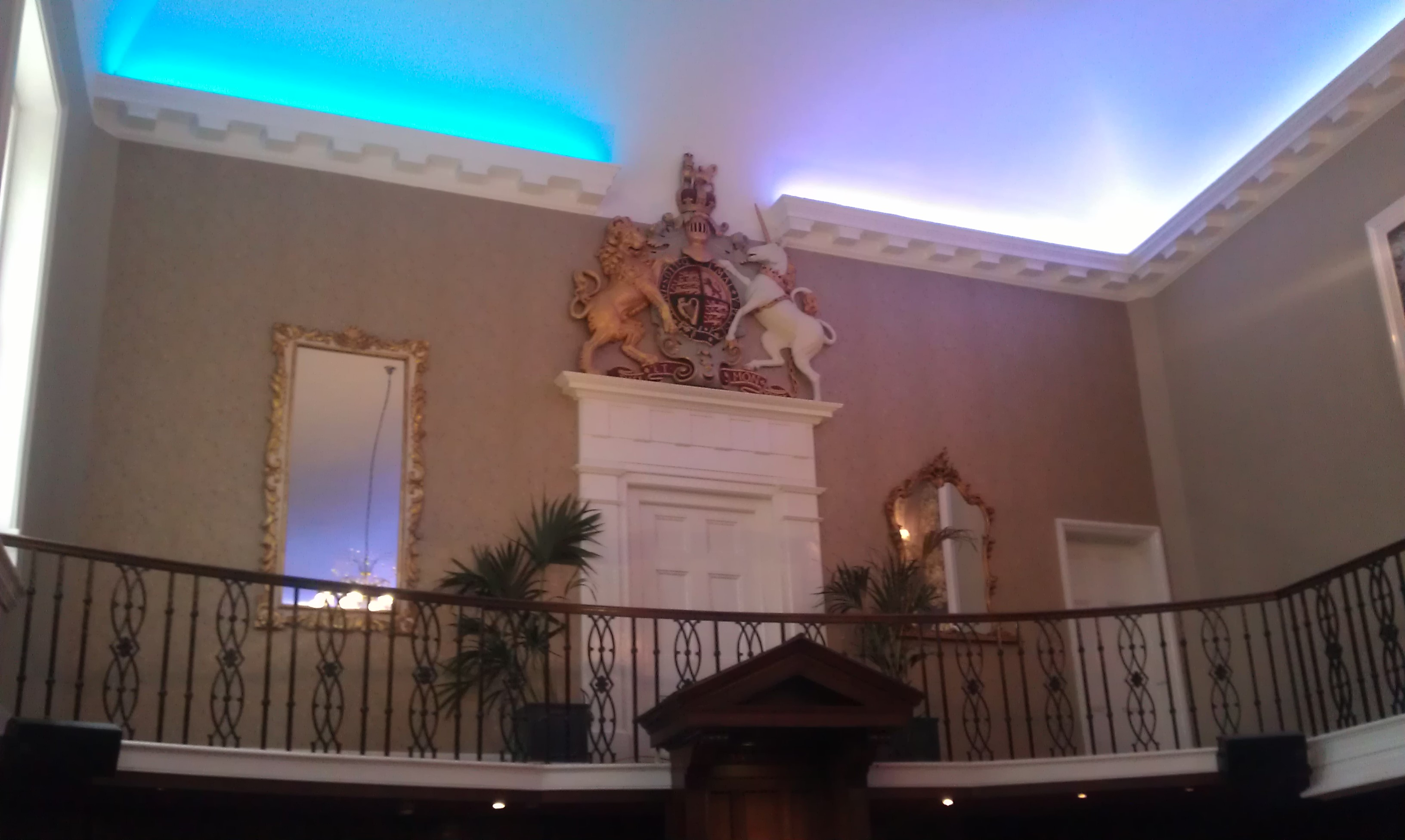
The interior of the bar, showing the preserved aspects of the courthouse.

The archaeologist, John Russell, has suggested that the site might have previously been occupied by a medieval guildhall, which would have operated independently of St Mary's Guildhall.

The current building was designed by Samuel Eglinton in the neo-classical style, built in ashlar stone and was completed in 1783. The design involved a symmetrical main frontage of five bays facing onto Cuckoo Lane. The ground floor was rusticated, while the first floor was fenestrated with sash windows with architraves and cornices. The central section of three bays, which was slightly projected forward, featured a tetrastyle portico on the first floor. The portico was formed by Doric order columns supporting an entablature, a cornice and a pediment. Internally, the principal room was the main courtroom.

Land adjacent to the building was used as a jail and a prison governor's house was attached to the building. The courthouse was used as the venue for the assizes in Coventry from 1843, although Coventry ceased to be a county in its own right under the Boundary Act 1847.

Notable cases included the trial and conviction of Mary Ball, in 1849, for poisoning her husband. She was hanged against the wall of the prison, since demolished, to the right of the court – the last person to be hanged there – in the presence of over 20,000 spectators.

The courts moved to the Coventry Combined Court Centre on Much Park Street in 1988 and the building subsequently lay empty until it was bought for use as a bar in 2000. The interior was redesigned although aspects of the courthouse such as the judge's chair and public gallery were left untouched.

== See also ==
- Grade II* listed buildings in Coventry
