= Lauren Jeska =

English attempted murderer

- Born: 5 September 1974 (age 52); Lancaster, Lancashire, England
- Education: Oxford University; Leeds University
- Known for: Attempted murder of Ralph Knibbs
- Criminal charges: Attempted murder, assault occasioning actual bodily harm
- Criminal penalty: 18 years imprisonment
- Criminal status: Imprisoned at HM Prison Foston Hall

Lauren Jeska (born 5 September 1974) is a British former fell runner from Lancaster. Jeska, was convicted of the attempted murder of Ralph Knibbs, HR manager for UK Athletics.

The motivation for the attempted murder was after Knibbs investigated Jeska's eligibility to compete as a woman based on the gender identity of Jeska as a trans woman.

== Early life ==
Jeska was born to Pauline and Graham Jameson in Lancaster. Graham Jameson is a mathematician at Lancaster University and both parents are active in Lancaster Baptist Church. She had two younger twin brothers, one of whom had mental health issues and took his own life.

Jeska went to Lancaster Royal Grammar School, running on the cross-country team. She went on to Oxford University, where she studied physics, gaining a first. Jeska began studying for a doctorate there but dropped out of the course. She later attended Leeds University, gaining a master's in 2006 in Gender, Sexuality and Queer Theory.

== Transitioning and fell-running ==
During Easter of 1998 Jeska came out to her parents as a trans woman. While at Leeds, she took up fell-running, finding immediate success in the women's category as runner-up in the Blackshaw Head fell race in 2008. She later joined Todmorden Harriers athletics club, and went on to win the 2010 Three Shires Fell Race, the 2011 Liverpool Half Marathon, the 2010, 2011, and 2012 English, and 2012 British Fell Running Championships. She joined Aberystwyth Athletics Club.

== Attempted murder conviction ==
In June 2015, UK Athletics told Jeska that she would be required to provide blood tests to prove that her hormone levels were within the normal female range. Jeska took exception as she felt it would reveal her transgender status publicly. She refused to provide the samples required.

In March 2016 she attacked Ralph Knibbs, a former professional rugby player and UK Athletics HR manager, with a knife at Alexander Stadium in Birmingham. Stabbing Knibbs in the head and neck several times: one 2 cm (0.8 in) laceration caused life-threatening blood loss and permanent nerve damage. Tim Begley and Kevan Taylor, employees of UK Athletics who came to Knibbs's aid, were also attacked and injured. The attack left Knibbs with restricted movement, difficulty eating, and limited vision in both eyes

In September 2016, Jeska pleaded guilty to attempted murder plus two counts of assault occasioning actual bodily harm on Begley and Taylor, and weapons charges for knife possession. Jeska claimed she feared UK Athletics would strip her of her records and her eligibility to compete in the female category. The admission was made while on remand at HM Prison Foston Hall, a women's prison, in Derbyshire. Her racing results were declared null and void.

On 15 November 2016, she was scheduled to be detained in hospital under the Mental Health Act 1983, but the hearing was adjourned for a month pending further psychiatric reports. Jeska was found during these investigations to have previously undiagnosed autism.

In March 2017, Jeska was sentenced to 18 years imprisonment.

== See also ==
- Transgender people in sports
