= Murder of Arthur Labinjo-Hughes =

2020 murder in England

Arthur Labinjo-Hughes
- Born: 4 January 2014
- Died: 17 June 2020 (aged 6); Birmingham Children's Hospital, England
- Cause of death: Brain injury due to blunt trauma
- Known for: Abuse and murder victim
- Parents: Olivia Labinjo-Halcrow (mother); Thomas Hughes (father); Emma Tustin (father's partner)

On 17 June 2020, Arthur Labinjo‑Hughes, a six‑year‑old boy living in the West Midlands, England, was murdered in his home by Thomas Hughes and Emma Tustin during the COVID-19 pandemic. Arthur was subjected to prolonged isolation, repeated physical assaults, food deprivation, and episodes of salt poisoning while living in Tustin's household. By the time emergency services were called, he was malnourished, covered in more than 130 bruises, and suffering from a catastrophic head injury inflicted by Tustin. In December 2021, Tustin was convicted of murder, and Thomas was convicted of manslaughter.

After Arthur's parents separated in his infancy, he was initially cared for by his mother, Olivia Labinjo‑Halcrow. When Labinjo‑Halcrow killed her partner in February 2019, responsibility for Arthur was transferred to Thomas. He later moved Arthur into Tustin's home during COVID‑19 restrictions, where the couple's behaviour became increasingly neglectful and abusive, with Arthur forced to spend extended periods isolated from the rest of the household. Despite concerns raised by extended family members, no statutory agency intervened.

The case attracted significant attention across the United Kingdom, prompting public discussion about the protection of children at risk of abuse and criticism of Child Protective Services for their failure to intervene.

== Background ==
Arthur Labinjo-Hughes was born on the 4 January 2014, the son of Olivia Labinjo-Halcrow and Thomas Hughes. The two separated shortly before his second birthday. Both Arthur's parents shared custody of him while he lived with his mother. In February 2019, Labinjo-Halcrow stabbed her new partner, Gary Cunningham, to death after a period of mutual domestic violence. This led to Thomas Hughes becoming Arthur's sole carer. Arthur changed schools to Dickens Heath Community Primary School and moved into an annex behind his paternal grandparents' home, with his father. According to his grandmother, Arthur was initially "nervous" but quickly became a "happy, well-rounded child".

In August 2019, Thomas Hughes met Emma Tustin on the dating website Plenty of Fish. Thomas Hughes introduced his son to Tustin early on in the relationship and she later stated that she and Arthur were "friends straight away". As Arthur returned to school after the summer holidays, a teaching assistant stated that she had "no concerns" about his wellbeing. However, the child's uncle noted that Thomas Hughes seemed to be becoming stricter with the boy, and Arthur appeared to be more fearful of getting into trouble. An official at Arthur's school noted that the child became less happy as autumn progressed. She organised a meeting with Arthur's father and grandmother about her concerns that the boy was developing an obsession with topics such as guns, death and the news, along with fears about being separated from or killed by his father. There was also an incident during a School Nativity play where Arthur became upset when a baby doll was removed from its crib.

In early 2020, Thomas Hughes took his son to multiple medical appointments but the boy was not diagnosed with any mental health problems. Meanwhile, the COVID-19 pandemic led to the closure of all schools in the UK and a national lockdown by the end of March 2020. At the beginning of the lockdown, Arthur and his father were staying in Tustin's home. Though Thomas Hughes' mother asked that he and Arthur come to her house, he refused, instead deciding to move in with Tustin at her home in Solihull for the duration of the lockdown.

== Abuse ==
In April 2020, Thomas Hughes returned home with his son for a few days due to a disagreement with Tustin. While he was at his grandparents' house, Arthur said that he had been pinned against the wall by Tustin, called a "horrible ugly brat", and his grandmother found several bruises on his back. Thomas Hughes soon returned to his partner's house and refused the grandmother's request to leave the boy at her house for longer, prompting her to report him to social services. The next day, a social worker went to visit Hughes and Tustin's household. She was told that Arthur's injuries had been sustained in a fight with Tustin's son. The social worker concluded that Arthur was 'very happy and very safe' and that there were no safeguarding issues in the household. Thomas Hughes said that Tustin coached the boys to lie about the incident and had warned him they would lose custody of their children if he did not cooperate as well. The incident was later reported to the police again by Arthur's uncle with no effect.

In May 2020, Arthur was frequently made to stand in the hallway for long periods of time as a punishment for his alleged misbehaviour. Tustin reported these incidents to Thomas via text messages and audio clips of him crying. In these clips, the child could be heard crying for his grandmother and uncle, and at one point said "nobody loves me". The couple used insults such as "Satan", "Hitler", "Devilchild", "weasel" and various swear words to refer to the boy. Thomas Hughes would frequently threaten violence against his son. Tustin said at one point to Thomas that "I want you but I don't want him", referring to Arthur. By the end of the month, Arthur was moved out of Tustin's son and daughter's bedroom and made to sleep on the living room floor. He was made to sleep there even when the other children slept elsewhere.

When Arthur's school reopened on 8 June he was not in attendance; Thomas Hughes was contacted by the school about the matter but provided various excuses for the child's absence. The couple installed a camera at home to monitor Arthur during his isolation. Arthur spent 35 hours of the three-day period between 12 and 14 June in the hallway having been forced to go there by his father and Tustin. He was slapped by Tustin for entering the living room. The camera also recorded the couple and Tustin's children enjoying food and leisure activities which Arthur was not allowed to participate in.

On 15 June, Tustin took Arthur with her to spend most of the day at her hairdresser's house. Throughout the six hours Tustin was there, she forced the boy to stand by the door, and frequently shouted and swore at him. Catherine Milhench, the hairdresser, would later tell Coventry Crown Court that Arthur looked "skeletal" and appeared to be drained and weak. "It wasn't nice to see," Ms Milhench said of Arthur: "You could see his collar bones. He was wearing a pyjama onesie and you could just see his collar bones sticking out. His legs trying to walk up the stairs would be shaking, like he couldn't hold himself up." When his father came to collect Ms Tustin and Arthur, Ms Milhench said, "Tom had him by the scruff, took him [outside]. I remember Arthur falling on the floor. He just collapsed and fell into the car." The child collapsed to the floor as they left the hairdresser's but was not helped by either Tustin or Hughes. Later that evening, Thomas Hughes belted Arthur's legs and later told Tustin to "Just end him".

== Day of the murder ==
On the morning of 16 June, Arthur appeared on CCTV footage to be weak, in visible pain and struggling to lift his bedclothes. Thomas Hughes, Tustin and Arthur went back to Milhench's house where Arthur was constantly shouted at by the former two. The child was secretly given a drink of water by the hairdresser's partner, Tobias Jarman, who later described him as "gaunt", "malnourished" and "a poor little kid who was broken". At the trial Jarman said “I tried to reassure him. I said, ‘You have not got to be scared of me in any way’. “He looked petrified. It was not the normal glow you see in a kid’s eyes of that age. It looked like there was fear ingrained inside of there.”

After getting home, Tustin went upstairs at about 2:00 pm. Later at trial, the prosecution argued that she gave Arthur an overdose of salt in the bathroom at around this time though Tustin denied this. Additionally, Tustin photographed Arthur crying in the hallway at 2:15 pm.

Tustin is believed to have carried out the fatal assault at 2:29pm when she went into the hallway, where Arthur was located. She shook Arthur and hit his head against a hard surface multiple times. The assault is believed to have lasted one minute. Twelve minutes later, after phoning Thomas Hughes, Tustin called 999 and told medics that he "fell and banged his head and while on the floor banged his head another five times". Tustin then took a photo of the dying boy, which she sent to Hughes. Paramedics from West Midlands Ambulance Service and officers from West Midlands Police arrived on scene shortly after the emergency call was made. Arthur was left with an unsurvivable brain injury. Arthur was taken to Birmingham Children's Hospital; however, doctors were unable to save him and he died later that night. He was six years old. At the time of his death, a medical review found that he was covered in 130 bruises, that he had been poisoned with salt, and that the extent of his injuries were compared to torture.

== Aftermath ==
The case made a significant impact on the local community and particularly football fans. Arthur's favourite team, Birmingham City F.C, named a family area at the St Andrew's stadium after him and supporters sang his name on a march through Birmingham prior to a match. More broadly the child was honoured at various football matches on 4 December 2021. The head of Solihull council reported that social workers had been forced to leave their homes due to abuse and threats related to the case. The incident provoked discussion of the impact of the COVID-19 lockdown on the welfare of vulnerable children. Anne Longfield, the former children's commissioner for England, said:

"...a lot of the services went on to the screens for children, and this child in particular, Arthur, wasn’t in school. And it's much easier for families who want to evade view to do that when they haven’t got someone in the room. So there’s a big lesson there, instantly about if there is a crisis, there are children who are going to slip from view and we have to make sure they have the protection, which does need face to face contact."

Statistics for England suggested that there had been a 20% decrease in referrals to local authorities' children's departments but a 20% increase in reported cases of child harm and a 19% increase in child deaths. The trial related to the case of Arthur Labinjo-Hughes took place at a similar time to the one related to the murder of Star Hobson, another young child who was abused and killed by carers. Several parallels were noted between the cases such as both children being killed by their parent's new partner, having extended family who tried to help them, and being of known concern to the authorities. Additionally, both were murdered during the COVID-19 pandemic which was argued to have made it easier for their worsening condition to be hidden from others.

In July 2021, Olivia Labinjo-Halcrow was convicted of the manslaughter of her partner, and was sentenced to 11 years in prison. Beginning in 2022, Birmingham City and Solihull Moors F.C. announced an annual pre-season game named "The Arthur Cup", with a portion of proceeds from the match going to the NSPCC.

=== Legal proceedings ===
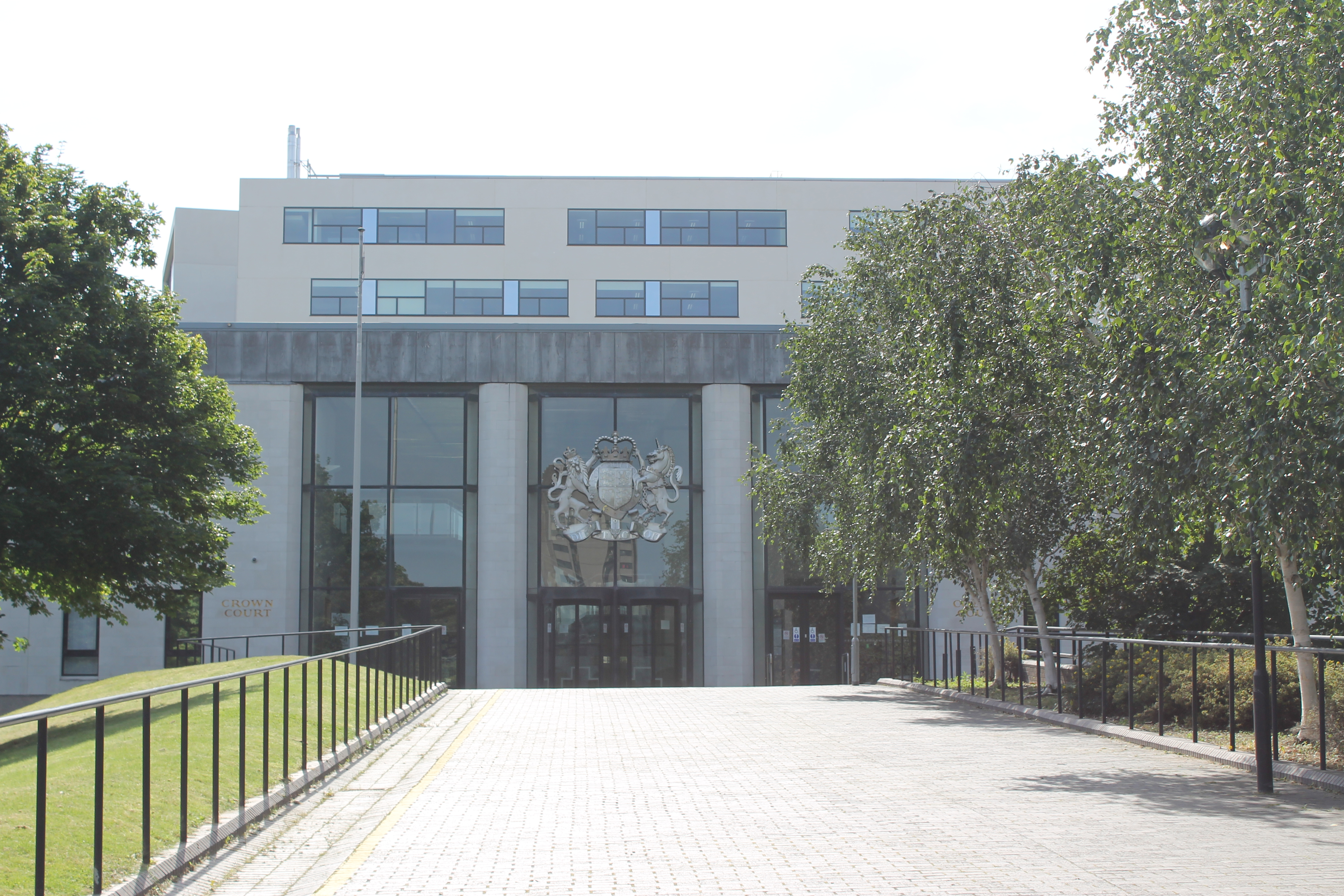
Coventry Combined Court Centre, where Tustin and Hughes were sentenced.

Due to the nature of Arthur's injuries and the accounts given by Tustin and Thomas Hughes, both were arrested on the evening of 16 June initially on suspicion of assault and then murder. Police officers examined hundreds of videos, audio files and photos found on Tustin's and Hughes' mobile phones, and analysed thousands of messages they sent each other. They uncovered significant evidence of abuse inflicted on Arthur by both.

Emma Tustin was convicted of murdering Arthur Labinjo-Hughes at Coventry Crown Court in December 2021, and was given a life sentence with a minimum of 29 years. She is being held at HMP Peterborough. Thomas Hughes was convicted of manslaughter and sentenced to 21 years. He is being held at HMP Wakefield. The Attorney General's office said on 4 December that the sentences would be reviewed to "determine whether they were too low" under the unduly lenient sentence scheme. Mr Justice Wall, the presiding judge, described the case in his sentencing remarks as among the most "distressing and disturbing" cases that he has dealt with. On 29 July 2022, Thomas Hughes' sentence was increased to 24 years on appeal as the judge found his original sentence to be too lenient.

A local review was launched into the incident soon after the boy's death. Shortly after the conviction, the government announced that there would be a national inquiry into the case. The review found that child protection services had been involved in Arthur's life on various occasions dating back to 2018 and repeatedly not intervened to help him.

== See also ==
- Louise Porton – British mother who murdered her own two children in 2018
- Murder of Victoria Climbié
- Killing of Peter Connelly
- Murder of Star Hobson
- Maxine Robinson
- Murder of Harmony Montgomery
- Murder of Daniel Pelka
- Murder of Shafilea Ahmed
