= Mary Ball (poisoner) =

Murderess

- a broadside published after the execution
- Born: Mary Wright c. 1818; Nuneaton, Warwickshire, England
- Died: 9 August 1849 (aged 31); Coventry, Warwickshire, England
- Resting place: Coventry Gaol
- Occupation: Housewife
- Known for: last person to be publicly executed in Coventry
- Spouse: Thomas Ball (m. 1838; died 1849)
- Status: executed by hanging
- Motive: unhappy marriage
- Criminal charge: murder
- Penalty: death

Details
- Victims: Thomas Ball
- Date: 20 May 1849

Mary Ball (c. 28 June 1818 – 9 August 1849) was an English housewife from Nuneaton, Warwickshire, who poisoned her husband with arsenic. She was hanged in Cuckoo Lane, outside Coventry Gaol, before a crowd of about twenty thousand. She was the last person to be publicly executed in Coventry.

A plaque on the former County Hall in Coventry marks the nearby site of her execution.

A historical account of the life, death and trail of Mary, The Life, Trial and Hanging of Mary Ball, was written by her great-great grandson Robert Muscutt. A novelised account of Mary's life, The Defiance of Mary Ball, was written by the same author.

A musical concept album presenting a fictionalised account of Mary's story called "Mary Ball - The Musical Concept Album", was released in August 2024 by composers Ben Fellows and Richard Barnfather.
