= Foston and Scropton =

Civil parish in Derbyshire, England

Coordinates: 52.869°N 1.714°W

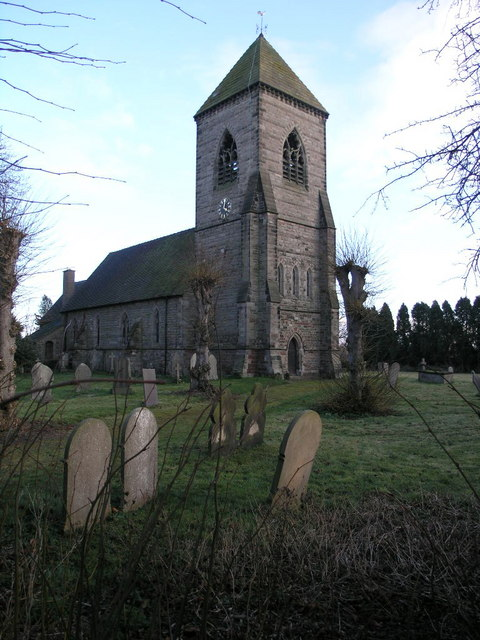
- St. Paul's parish church

- Location within Derbyshire
- Population: 728 (2001 census)
- OS grid reference: SK1930
- Civil parish: Foston and Scropton
- District: South Derbyshire
- Shire county: Derbyshire
- Region: East Midlands
- Country: England
- Sovereign state: United Kingdom
- Post town: Derby
- Postcode district: DE65
- Dialling code: 01283
- Police: Derbyshire
- Fire: Derbyshire
- Ambulance: East Midlands
- UK Parliament: South Derbyshire
- Website: Foston and Scropton Parish Council

Foston and Scropton is a civil parish in the Dove valley in South Derbyshire. It includes the village of Scropton and hamlet of Foston. The population of the civil parish at the 2001 Census was 728 increasing to 854 at the 2011 Census.

The Domesday Book records that in 1086 Henry de Ferrers held a manor here.

The Church of England parish church of Saint Paul, Scropton contains late 15th and early 16th century monuments. However, the church was rebuilt in 1855–56 under the direction of the Gothic Revival architect Benjamin Ferrey. The village of Scropton has no shop or pub but it does have a large house called the old school house.

== Economy ==
Scropton's Cranberry Foods was bought by Faccenda Group in May 2012; the site is the second largest turkey processor in the UK after Bernard Matthews Ltd. Foston is home to JCB Power Systems, and a large dairy of Dairy Crest.

== See also ==
- Listed buildings in Foston and Scropton

== Sources ==
- Pevsner, Nikolaus; Williamson, Elizabeth (1978) [1953]. Derbyshire. The Buildings of England. Harmondsworth: Penguin Books. p. 315. ISBN 0-14-071008-6.
