= The East Manchester Academy =

Location
- 60 Grey Mare Lane; Beswick; Manchester, Greater Manchester, M11 3DS; England; 53.47841°N 2.195365°W

Information
- Type: Academy
- Established: 2010
- Local authority: Manchester City Council
- Department for Education URN: 144494 Tables
- Ofsted: Reports
- Principal: Jacqueline Bowen
- Gender: Mixed
- Age: 11 to 16
- Enrolment: 983 as of November 2021
- Capacity: 1000
- Website: http://www.theeastmanchesteracademy.co.uk

The East Manchester Academy is a coeducational secondary school located in the Beswick area of Manchester, England.

It was established as an academy in September 2010, and was originally sponsored by Laing O'Rourke, Lend Lease, Manchester City Council and The Manchester College. The school also had specialisms in The Built Environment and Performing Arts.

However, due to poor performance the school became part of the Education and Leadership Trust in September 2016.

Today, The East Manchester Academy offers GCSEs, BTECs and vocational qualifications as programmes of study for its pupils.
