= Proposals for an English Academy =

History of the efforts to establish a regulator for the English language

During the early part of the 17th century, and persisting in some form into the early 18th century, there were a number of proposals for an English Academy: some form of learned institution, conceived as having royal backing and a leading role in the intellectual life of the nation. Definite calls for an English Academy came in 1617, based on the Italian model dating back to the 16th century; they were followed up later, after the 1635 founding of the French Académie, by John Dryden (1664), John Evelyn (1665), and Daniel Defoe (1697).

== Historical overview ==
The proposals for an English Academy were initially and typically characterised by an antiquarian interest, for example in heraldry and medieval history. They represented a conservative wing in the larger discussion, and in different ways they informed approaches to the idea of a learned society as an active educational and regulatory body. In fact no such Academy would be set up, though discussion of the perceived need for one continued into the eighteenth century. The development of ideas on the language-regulation function of a putative English Academy was studied initially by Hermann Martin Flasdieck. Flasdieck distinguished three phases: first private initiatives up to the middle of the 17th century; then the Restoration period in which the Royal Society and its membership took an interest; and a later period in which proposals to mirror the French Académie met with serious opposition.

Nothing much came directly of such proposals, typically for an "academy royal" or court academy; but they formed part of a wider debate including the role of the universities, and the foundation of new institutions such as the successive Gresham College, Chelsea College, Durham College, and the Royal Society, which had very different fates, as well as the pansophic projects that failed to get off the drawing board.

== Elizabethan proposals ==
In the early 1570s Humphrey Gilbert published The erection of an achademy in London, concerned with the education of wards and the younger sons of gentlemen. The proposed course included subjects seen as practical, as well as classical studies. This conception already had a generation of history behind it: in the reign of Henry VIII Nicholas Bacon (with Robert Carey and Thomas Denton) had reported on a project to create a new inn of court, conceived along the lines of a humanist academy. Bacon had then taken the idea further and combined it with legal experience of wardship, and in a paper of 1561 made a recommendation to the queen.

The home and library of John Dee at Mortlake from 1570 to the early 1580s has been identified as a prototype 'academy'. His circle included Thomas Hariot and Walter Raleigh, and was closely linked to that around Henry Percy, 9th Earl of Northumberland. These groups with Gresham College comprised the centre of English scientific life at the period.

=== The Elizabethan Society of Antiquaries ===
The College (or Society) of Antiquaries met from around 1586 to around 1607. The membership comprised successful lawyers, members of the College of Arms, wealthy collectors of old manuscripts and a few professional archivists. They met in London during each law term unless plague intervened. Using the notebook of one member, Francis Tate, Wright dates 22 meetings from 1590 to 1601. Thereafter, meetings became less regular, not only owing to plague but also to the suspicions of the government of James I after 1603.

Two subjects for discussion were agreed in advance of meetings and every member was expected to contribute. They aimed to "construct a detailed and credible account of the origins and development of the English people." Some, influenced by William Camden's Britannia, tackled the broad historical picture from pre-Roman times; some specialised in common law developments from the twelfth century. However, others began a serious study of the early-medieval origins of English culture and identity. In so doing, they made considerable use of Anglo-Saxon manuscripts in both Old English and Latin to supplement still thin published sources.

A large number of the contributions to their discussions were published by Thomas Hearne in the eighteenth century and these give several indications of how the antiquaries worked. For example, on 24 November 1599, the Society chose to discuss the antiquity, etymology and variety of English terms used to measure land. Arthur Agard (or Agarde), the Society's most respected member, was hesitant:

Although I must confess that in this proposition I have more travelled than in any of the former, for that it concerneth me more to understand the right thereof, especially in that sundry have resorted to me thereabouts to know whether I have in my custody any records that avouch the same in certainty; yet so it fareth with me, that in perusing as well those abbreviations I have noted out of Domesday and other records …, as also those notes I have quoted out of ancient registers and books which have fallen into my hands within these xxx. years, I have found the diversity of measurement so variable and different in every … place in the realm, as I was in a mammering ….

Society members consulted Agard for advice on what material might be available. He had been deputy chamberlain of the exchequer since 1570, responsible for what would be a 40-year project to compile inventories of the four treasuries at Westminster, which contained both royal and abbey records.

The Society was eventually closed down owing to the disapproval of James I. Those involved included:

- Arthur Agard, 1535/6–1615
- Benedict Barnham
- Robert Beale
- Edward Brerewood
- Hugh Broughton
- William Camden
- Richard Carew
- Sir Robert Cotton
- William Hakewill
- Michael Heneage
- William Lambarde
- James Ley,
- William Patten
- John Stow
- James Strangman
- Thomas Talbot
- Francis Tate
- Francis Thynne

Robert Bruce Cotton and others petitioned Elizabeth I to establish a national library and academy, having in mind an institution for antiquarian study. The Society paid attention to the succession to Elizabeth, and then the Jacobean debate on the Union, with union tracts written by Cotton and another member, John Dodderidge, papers read on names for "Britain" in 1604, and Walter Cope, a member and M.P., involved in the parliamentary debate.

== Jacobean proposals ==
Henry Frederick, Prince of Wales revived by his patronage Humphrey Gilbert's proposal. He combined that concept with the French model of Antoine de Pluvinel's riding academy, which included varied studies. The project was intended to cover mathematics and languages as well as equestrian skills, but was cut short by the Prince's death.

The suppression of the Society of Antiquaries having left a hiatus in intellectual life, at least as far as antiquarian interests were concerned, Edmund Bolton brought forward a plan for a royal academy (his "academ roial"). In 1617 a list of 27 names was put forward: it included Sir John Hayward, and Henry Ferrers. A similar list in 1624 included Sir William Segar. Bolton proposed a complex structure, an outer ring of membership (listing 84), and a role in censorship of publications outside theology, all supported by a subsidy. He gained some support from George Villiers, 1st Duke of Buckingham, who put forward a plan (attributed to Prince Henry) in the 1621 Parliament; but nothing came of it. The end of the reign put an end to the plan.

Salomon's House, the proposal or model from Francis Bacon's New Atlantis for an institution of natural philosophy, dates also from this period at the end of the reign of James I. It is an orderly and royally authorised institute for research. Bacon's follower Thomas Bushell was later rumoured to be intending to set up an actual institution, in London, or Wells in Somerset.

== Kynaston's academy ==
The foundation in 1635 of the Académie française coincided closely with Francis Kynaston's setting up of an actual educational institution, his Musaeum Minervae, in his own home in Covent Garden. The king gave money, and the academy admitted young gentlemen only, on exclusive grounds. The tutors were hand-picked by Kynaston. The new institution was satirised, though mildly, by Richard Brome's play The New Academy (dated to 1636).

Kynaston gave his own house in Bedford Street, Covent Garden, for the college, with ambitions to move into Chelsea College. He furnished it with books, manuscripts, musical and mathematical instruments, paintings, and statues, at his own expense. He was himself the regent, and his friends Edward May, Michael Mason, Thomas Hunt, Nicholas Fiske, John Spiedal (Spidall), and Walter Salter were professors in various areas. According to the Constitutions published by Kynaston in 1636, only the nobility and gentry were to be admitted to the college, the object of which was to prepare candidates for a Grand Tour. The full course was to occupy seven years; no gentleman was ‘to exercise himself at once about more than two particular sciences, arts, or qualities, whereof one shall be intellectual, the other corporall.’ The regent taught the following subjects: heraldry, a practical knowledge of deeds and the principles and processes of common law, antiquities, coins, husbandry. Music, dancing and behaviour, riding, sculpture, and writing also formed important parts of the curriculum.

The academy idea was still in the air in the years before the First English Civil War, and Thomas Howard, 21st Earl of Arundel brought forward a proposal during the Short Parliament. Samuel Hartlib spoke of a pilot scheme he had run. In the years 1648–1650 Balthazar Gerbier revived the idea of an academy on Kynaston's lines in a series of pamphlets. Peter Chamberlen the third suggested an academy to oversee public welfare, as part of his reforming scheme.

== After the Restoration of 1660 ==
Around 1660 John Evelyn and Robert Boyle were interested once more in the idea of an academy. Evelyn's experience abroad included a meeting of the Umoristi, an academy in Rome devoted to verse and linguistic matters. Language now became aspect of the "English Academy" issue that continued to resonate with English literati, and was floated by small groups from time to time; and Evelyn himself was a constant advocate of attention to it. Evelyn sent Boyle a plan, costed at something over £1000, in a letter from in September 1659; in 1660 Bengt Skytte, a follower of Comenius, brought up a pansophic version of the concept with Boyle and others, on a similar scale. These ideas were overtaken by Boyle's involvement in the 1660 committee of 12 which led shortly to the formation of the Royal Society.

Abraham Cowley in 1661 conspicuously and in detail advocated a "philosophical college" near central London, that would function as an innovating educational institution, in his Proposition for the Advancement of Experimental Philosophy. One supporter of an English Academy to regulate the language was Thomas Sprat of the Royal Society, founded in 1662. A group actually met in Gray's Inn in 1665 to plan an academy, as was recalled later by Evelyn: Cowley and Sprat were involved, with George Villiers, 2nd Duke of Buckingham, Matthew Clifford, Cyril Wyche, John Dryden, and others. After only a little progress, London was subject to the Great Plague,

Wentworth Dillon, 4th Earl of Roscommon set up, around 1682, a literary society that attracted the name 'academy'. It involved Dryden, other participants being George Savile, Marquess of Halifax, Richard Maitland, Charles Sackville, 6th Earl of Dorset, Lord Cavendish, Sir Charles Scarborough, and Heneage Finch. Their linguistic interests extended mainly to issues of translation. This group was documented by Knightly Chetwood, Roscommon's friend.

Giovanni Torriano, in his The Italian Reviv'd, equated some English clubs of the Restoration period with groups who in France or Italy would be called "academies".

== Later proposals ==
At the beginning of the reign of William III and Mary II a proposed Royal Academies Company was a lottery scheme. Lewis Maidwell (1650–1716) had some initial success in promoting his school in King Street, London as chartered by William III, with a modernised curriculum. He proposed a tax on publications to support it, but was opposed in Parliament and met with serious resistance from the universities. At the same period Daniel Defoe in his Essay upon Projects had a section on academies.

Jonathan Swift in his Proposal for Correcting, Improving and Ascertaining the English Tongue, advocated an academy for regulating the English language. In the form of a call for a "national dictionary" to regulate the English language, on the French model, this conception had much support from Augustan men of letters: Daniel Defoe, Joseph Addison (The Spectator 135 in 1711) and Alexander Pope. At the end of Queen Anne's reign some royal backing was again possible, but that ended with the change of monarch in 1714.

The whole idea later met stern opposition, however, from the lexicographer Samuel Johnson, invoking "English liberty" against the prescription involved: he predicted disobedience of an academy supposed to set usage. Matthew Arnold, in an 1862 essay The Literary Influence of Academies, was positive in assessing the French and Italian cultural academies; but marks an endpoint in the tradition. In Culture and Anarchy Arnold denied that he supported setting up an English Academy, guying the likely membership as establishment figures.

During his 1780 diplomatic mission to Amsterdam, statesman, and later President of the United States, John Adams advocated for an official English Academy as part of the federal government in a letter to the Second Continental Congress. The proposal was later rejected by the Continental Congress due to concerns of individual liberty, and marked one of the earliest instances of the government’s consideration of linguistic diversity.

In 1820, William Cardell founded the American Academy of Language and Belles Lettres. However, it ceased to exist in 1822.

The English Academy of Southern Africa was founded in 1961.
