= Lorraine Thorpe =

British double murderer

- Born: 1994 (age 31–32); Ipswich, Suffolk, England
- Penalty: Life imprisonment with a minimum tariff of 14 years imprisonment

Details
- Victims: 2
- Country: United Kingdom
- Imprisoned at: HM Prison Foston Hall

Lorraine Thorpe (born 1994) is a British woman who is Britain's youngest female double murderer. Over nine days in August 2009, Thorpe tortured and murdered two people in Ipswich, one of whom was her own father. She came to national attention upon her conviction in 2010, when it was noted that she had only been 15 years old at the time of the killings. She was sentenced to life imprisonment with a minimum tariff of 14 years' imprisonment, while her accomplice in the murders was issued with a 27-year minimum tariff. She remains imprisoned at HM Prison Foston Hall, having been refused parole in October 2023.

== Background ==
Thorpe was raised in Ipswich, Suffolk. She grew up in poverty, living with her father in a number of "squalid" flats and sometimes in tents. She became associated with a group of middle-aged alcoholics who often engaged in violence and regularly fought with each other. The group were also thieves and repeatedly stole in order to be able to pay for alcohol. Thorpe came to the attention of social services, but they could not keep track of her, and every time she was placed in a specially assigned school, she went back to her father. Her frail father was likewise an alcoholic, and Thorpe had the responsibility of caring for him from a very young age. Her upbringing was said to have left her as a violent young woman who was also highly manipulative.

== Murders ==
=== Rosalyn Hunt ===
Thorpe and 41-year-old Paul Clarke, whom she had met through drinking, murdered a member of their social circle of drinkers in August 2009. After a falling out over a dog, the pair lured 41-year-old Rosalyn Hunt to their flat in Ipswich and tortured her. The woman was kicked, punched and stamped on by Thorpe, and the pair also used cheese graters, dog lead chains and salt to torture her. After days of torture, the woman was still alive, and was eventually beaten to death.

On 9 August 2009, a member of the public rang police to raise concerns about the safety of Hunt, and officers found her dead when they entered her property in Victoria Street.

=== Her father ===
Days after the murder of Hunt, the pair decided to murder Lorraine's own 43-year-old father Desmond Thorpe in order to silence him from implicating them in the first murder to police. Lorraine smothered her disabled father with a cushion before kicking him as he lay prone on the floor. She later admitted to police that they would find 'her trainer prints on his head'.

Desmond's body was found by police on the morning of 10 August after they were told a man had died in Limerick Close. His body was found only hours after the discovery of Hunt's. Police immediately announced that they suspected the murders were linked and arrested both Clarke and Lorraine. On 25 August, they appeared in court charged with the murders.

== Trial ==
Clarke and Thorpe were convicted of the murders at Ipswich Crown Court on 3 August 2010. Both had denied the charges but gave no evidence during their trial. Prosecution barrister Ros Jones said: "Rosalyn Hunt became a prisoner in her own home and died from multiple injuries due to the continuous attacks she suffered at their hands. Desmond Thorpe, who was killed days later, had been smothered for reasons known only to Clarke and Thorpe." As part of the evidence against them, jurors heard evidence from a young friend of Thorpe's who said that she had confessed to her to being a murderer. A fellow inmate also testified that Thorpe had spoken about her father's murder to them on the anniversary of his killing. Clarke was sentenced to life imprisonment with a minimum term of 27 years while Thorpe's sentencing was delayed until September at the Old Bailey, where she was duly sentenced to life imprisonment with a minimum term of 14 years. Mr Justice Sweeney said that Thorpe had in part carried out the attacks as she had been keen to "impress" Clarke. In his sentencing remarks, Sweeney said:

She was responsible for protracted kicking, punching and stamping on Rosalyn, who was not fit to defend herself effectively from the outset. By the end of those attacks she was completely helpless. Far from being sorry, Lorraine appears to have gloried in it, describing to her friends at one stage how she stamped on Rosalyn's head [...] The only possible explanation for [Desmond Thorpe's] death can be the fear that he would go and tell the police what happened to Rosalyn Hunt [...] I don't accept that she was entirely under the control of Mr Clark. She is someone who can be quite stubborn and wilful and is capable of being highly manipulative herself [...] Her story is an appalling one."

=== Reaction ===
Upon being convicted, Thorpe officially became Britain's youngest female double murderer, being only 15 at the time of the attacks, a fact that was widely reported in the media both in Britain and abroad. Her case was compared to those of Sharon Carr, Britain's youngest female murderer who killed aged only 12 in 1992, and Mary Bell, who was 11 when she killed two young boys in Newcastle in 1968 (although younger than Thorpe, Bell was convicted of manslaughter not murder, meaning Thorpe is Britain's youngest female double murderer). The Evening Standard reported that Thorpe had joined "a small group of Britain's most evil women killers", including Myra Hindley and Rose West.

== Subsequent events ==
Thorpe and Clarke had appeals against their convictions for the murder of Desmond Thorpe turned down in April 2011, with judges at the Court of Appeal saying that they had no doubt the convictions were safe. The pair did not challenge their convictions for the murder of Rosalyn Hunt.

In September 2014, Paul Clarke was found dead in prison at HM Prison Whitemoor. It is believed that his death was a suicide.

As of September 2019, Thorpe was imprisoned in HM Prison Foston Hall. In March 2023, it was reported that Thorpe would have her first parole hearing. Thorpe, who declined to take an active role in the parole board's case review process, was denied release in October 2023, but remains eligible for parole review in the future.

== In popular culture ==
A number of documentaries have been published which have covered Thorpe's case:

- On 16 December 2011, a season 5 episode of Deadly Women was broadcast which covered Thorpe's case, titled "Baby-Faced Killers".
- On 8 September 2014, Channel 5 aired a documentary on Thorpe as part of its Countdown to Murder series. The series 2 episode was titled "Killer Schoolgirl" and featured interviews with Rosalyn Hunt's brother as well as officers of the investigative team.
- On 26 March 2017, an episode of the CBS Reality series Teens Who Kill documented Thorpe's crimes.
- On 24 May 2019, an episode of Britain's Deadliest Kids aired that focused on Thorpe.
- On 7 October 2019, a series 2 episode of the Crime+ Investigation programme Murdertown documented Thorpe's crimes. It was the fourth episode of series 2.

== See also ==
- Mary Bell
- Sharon Carr
- Nicola Edgington
- Louise Porton – fellow British female double murderer imprisoned with Thorpe in HM Prison Foston Hall
