= Sharon Carr =

Belizean-born British murderer (born 1979)

- Born: Sharon Louise Carr; 21 December 1979 (age 46); Belize
- Other name: "The Devil's Daughter"
- Motive: Sexual gratification
- Convictions: 25 March 1997 (for murder)
- Penalty: Life imprisonment with a minimum tariff of 14 years imprisonment (1997)

Details
- Victims: 1 murder victim, at least 4 others injured in additional attacks/attempted murders
- Span of crimes: June 1992 – August 2019
- Country: United Kingdom
- Date apprehended: 8 June 1994
- Imprisoned at: HM Prison Bronzefield

Sharon Louise Carr (born 1979), also known as "The Devil's Daughter", is a Belizean woman who, in June 1992, aged 12, murdered 18-year-old Katie Rackliff at random as the latter walked home from a nightclub in Camberley, Surrey, England.

The murder initially went unsolved until June 1994, when Carr attacked and stabbed another pupil at Collingwood College Comprehensive School for no apparent reason and then repeatedly boasted about the murder of Rackliff to friends and family and in her diary entries made in prison. She was convicted of the murder in 1997, attracting much media interest owing to her young age and the brutality of the killing. She was ordered to serve at least 14 years' imprisonment but has remained imprisoned long after this minimum tariff expired owing to her disruptive behaviour in prison. A restricted status prisoner, she has continued regularly to attack and attempt to kill staff members and fellow inmates and has regularly expressed her desire to kill others.

== Background ==
Carr was born in Belize on 21 December 1979 and was brought up by her mother and stepfather. She was one of four children and grew up in poverty. She never knew her biological father. After moving to England in 1986, the family settled in Camberley, Surrey. Her parents' marriage soon ended following a serious domestic violence incident in which Carr's mother poured boiling fat over her stepfather. The incident caused the couple to be hospitalised with burns, and Carr's mother was charged with assault.

At school, Carr was initially described as polite and helpful by teachers. Friends said that she was a sociable girl who preferred the company of older boys and that she occasionally showed flashes of aggression. Later, she became much more badly behaved, becoming disruptive and attention-seeking, and she had problems relating to authority. In 1990, her headteacher at Cordwallis Junior School in Camberley contacted social services over her behaviour. Sharon was briefly put into foster care, but she returned home after only one month. By the time she started secondary school, her mother had a new partner who already had two daughters.

== Murder of Katie Rackliff ==
In the early hours of 7 June 1992, Carr randomly stabbed 18-year-old apprentice hairdresser Katie "Kate" Rackliff to death as the latter walked home from Ragamuffins nightclub in Camberley. Carr stabbed Rackliff—who was a stranger to her—32 times with a six-and-a-half-inch knife through her ribs, in her heart and in her vagina and anus. Some of Rackliff's jewellery was then stolen. Rackliff's body was taken by Carr and some accomplices and driven to Farnborough, where she was dragged along a road and then dumped by a cemetery wall. A group of boys found the body later that morning.

When police investigated the killing, they noted the brutality of the attack. Some of the knife blows that Rackliff had suffered had gone straight through her body. Her sexual organs had been mutilated, and officers found that her clothes had been pulled up, but there was no sign of sexual assault. Owing to the nature and severity of the injuries inflicted and that the attack appeared to be sexually motivated, police believed the attacker to be an adult male. In part because of this, the real killer went unidentified, and the case went initially unsolved.

== Stabbing of pupil ==
With Carr not apprehended, she returned to school but was excluded twice in early 1994. On 7 June 1994, the second anniversary of Rackliff's murder, Carr attacked a 13-year-old fellow pupil with a knife, for no apparent reason, in the toilets at Collingwood College Comprehensive School. Carr stabbed the victim in the back, causing a lung puncture; the attack was stopped when five students entered the toilets and intervened. The victim said that Carr was smiling and appeared happy during the attack. Carr did not return home that day and was found on school grounds the next morning; after being arrested, she told officers that she enjoyed stabbing cats and had beheaded a dog.

=== Initial imprisonment and further attacks ===
After arrest, Carr was sent to a medical assessment Centre, where she tried to strangle two members of staff. She was charged with two counts of actual bodily harm for this in addition to the charges for the attack at Collingwood College. She was convicted in December 1994 and sentenced to be detained "at Her Majesty's pleasure". She was initially held in various psychiatric units but continued regularly to seriously assault other females, and so was transferred to an all-boys unit at Aycliffe Secure Centre. In September 1995, she was transferred to Bullwood Hall young offenders' institution in Essex, where it was thought her aggressive and sexualized behavior could be better managed.

=== Confessions to Rackliff murder ===
Soon after her transfer to Bullwood Hall, staff discovered that Carr was talking about the killing of Katie Rackliff to friends and family on the telephone and in her diary. She also admitted to attacking a prison officer on whom she said she had a "crush", and talked about it to a probation officer. Staff alerted police, who seized Carr's writings and drawings. Her diaries were found to contain details of her sexual excitement at the thought of Rackliff's death, and Carr also commented that she felt "jealous" of her victim and remarked about the devil and the forces which motivated her. One passage read "If only I could kill you again [...] I promise I would make you suffer more this time, you fucking slag. Your terrified screams turned me on." The sexual element of the killing had previously been indicated by the mutilation of Rackliff's body. Carr had also written "I swear I was born to be a murderer", and in a letter to a friend, wrote "I'm a killer. Killing is my business. And business is good." She had also drawn pictures of the knife involved.

Detectives questioned Carr on the murder, and she confessed to the killing, admitting that she had repeatedly stabbed Rackliff. She graphically described one particular injury and provided details that the police had deliberately withheld, meaning that she had knowledge that only the killer would have. Carr also knew that a bracelet had been stolen from Rackliff, which police had not revealed. Carr helped police film a reconstruction of the murder in which she acted out the murder and, when questioned about the attack, repeatedly laughed about the details.

Police found that Carr had a long history of cruelty to animals, having once decapitated a dog with a spade, and concluded that she probably had a form of psychopathic disorder, although a precise diagnosis remained elusive. Carr continued to write her boasts about the murder even after being questioned by the police, and in January 1996 gave a further series of confessions to prison officers that she had a "crush" on. On the fourth anniversary of the murder, she wrote in her diary: "Respect to Katie Rackliff. Four years ago today."

=== Murder trial ===
Carr was charged with the murder of Rackliff in May 1996. Her accomplices did not stand trial. On 25 March 1997, after a month-long trial at Winchester Crown Court, Carr was convicted of murder. The jury had deliberated for five hours before reaching a unanimous guilty verdict, choosing to convict her for murder and not manslaughter. The conviction meant that Carr was officially Britain's youngest ever female murderer, having been only 12 at the time of the killing (Mary Bell, who was convicted at age 11 in connection with the killings of two boys in 1968, was convicted of manslaughter instead of murder). When sentencing Carr, Mr Justice Baker remarked: "What is clear is that you had a sexual motive for this killing and it is apparent both from the brutal manner in which you mutilated her body and chilling entries in your diary, that killing, as you put it, turns you on. You are in my view an extremely dangerous young woman." Carr was smiling as she left the dock after the conviction. She received a minimum tariff of 14 years imprisonment after her trial.

Criminal psychologist Gordon Tressler noted the extremely unusual nature of the case, saying: "This is a difficult case to understand. One can find precedents of young children killing other young children, but in this case it was a child killing someone who was almost an adult."

Carr was branded "The Devil's Daughter" in the press. The media reported extensively on the historical conviction of such a young murderer, highlighting her obsession with death and violence.

== Subsequent imprisonment and continued attacks ==
Following her murder conviction, Carr was held in HM Prison Holloway. She was later transferred to Broadmoor Hospital in 1998. While in Broadmoor, she continued to assault staff and other residents and admitted wanting to kill a fellow inmate by slitting her throat. On occasions, she also claimed to believe that she was a lizard and tried to cut herself to attempt to find out whether she was still human.

In 2004, it was reported that Carr's defence team were challenging her 14-year minimum tariff as well as her conviction, with Carr wanting her murder conviction to be replaced with one of manslaughter on the grounds of diminished responsibility. However, the appeals were dismissed.

In 2007, Carr was moved again to the medium-secure Orchard Unit but was sent to HM Prison Bronzefield in Surrey in 2015 as a Restricted Status prisoner, as she was presenting a risk to patients and staff. Her warrant stated that she no longer required treatment or that no effective treatment could be given. In December 2018, she was moved to HM Prison Low Newton in County Durham but was quickly moved back to Bronzefield after a violent incident with another inmate in August 2019. In the same year, her application for her Restricted Status to be downgraded was denied. She appealed against this decision in 2020, but this was also denied on the grounds that she had yet to provide any significant evidence of a reduction in risk. A prison supervisor at Bronzefield reported that Carr was still evidencing incidents of volatile relationships and was continuing to have paranoid thoughts. She had also disclosed the desire to murder another prisoner.

It was reported in September 2022 that Carr was to have another parole hearing to determine whether she would be released. In August 2023, Carr was denied parole after still being considered a danger to the public.

As of January 2026, Carr continues to be imprisoned despite the expiration of her minimum tariff.

== Lasting notoriety ==
Carr's case has been noted for being particularly unusual. While female murderers are themselves uncommon, females who kill strangers are even more unusual, and the case of a 12-year-old girl killing an adult stranger has been described as unique.

In 2005, there was another stabbing incident at Collingwood College, in which a 14-year-old stabbed a fellow pupil. This led to renewed media interest in the school and the Carr case, with allegations being made that there was a culture of problems at Collingwood. However, local MP Michael Gove defended the school. In 2010, Carr's case was again discussed in the press when another British child, 15-year-old Lorraine Thorpe, became Britain's youngest convicted female double murderer. Carr's case also returned to the news in 2016 when two female children were convicted of the murder of a vulnerable woman named Angela Wrightson, which led to comparisons with Carr's case.

Another known case of a child killing an adult stranger was the 2023 murder of 19-year-old Shawn Seesahai by two 12-year-old boys.

== In popular culture ==
Carr's case has featured in a number of documentaries:

- In 2014, Carr was the subject of a season 8 episode of Deadly Women, titled "Never Too Young". The show incorrectly states her sentence as life without parole.
- In 2017, Carr was the subject of an episode of Teens Who Kill, a series shown on Channel 5.
- In 2017, a documentary on Carr, made by television personality Jo Frost, aired on Crime+ Investigation, as part of the series Jo Frost on Britain's Killer Kids.

== See also ==
- Nicola Edgington
- Murder of Alison Shaughnessy
- Murder of Jean Bradley – case that was once linked to Rackliff's murder
- Maria Pearson – UK's longest-serving female prisoner, has served seven years longer than Carr
