= Dan Frazier (rugby union) =

English rugby union footballer (born 1988)

- Born: 13 December 1988 (age 37) England
- Height: 1.91 m (6 ft 3 in)
- Weight: 110 kg (17 st 5 lb)
- School: Collingwood

Rugby union career
- Position: Prop
- Current team: Doncaster Knights
Senior career
Years	Team	Apps	(Points)
2010	Doncaster Knights		

Dan Frazier (born 13 December 1988) is an ex-rugby union player who previously played for Newcastle Falcons in the Aviva Premiership, having been at Harlequins and the Doncaster Knights beforehand.

== Early life ==
Frazier grew up in Surrey and studied at Collingwood College, Surrey.

== Career ==
A tight head prop who loves scrummaging, whilst still at school he played tight-head for his junior club Chobham and as a 17-year-old played 1st XV with them, in 2007/08/09 Frazier made 1st XV appearances for Rosslyn Park in National League 3.

For the 2009/10 season Frazier, played for Esher in National 1 helping them gain promotion to The Championship.

The 22-year-old prop has joined Doncaster Knights from Harlequins for the 2010/11 season. Frazier, who stands 6' 3" tall and weighs in at over 18 stone, has been a member of the Quins Academy for the past three seasons and has been playing regularly in the "A" XV league. He was on the bench for the full Quins side in the last Premiership game of the season against Sale.

Frazier was unfortunately forced to retire from Newcastle Falcons in 2012 after suffering a severe back injury with a torn spinal disc. After surgery and lengthy recovery training, he has since moved on to weightlifting, competing in various Strongman events and also running his own company 'Barbells and Beans' with a speciality coffee shop. Frazier has not ruled out a return to rugby.
