= Ralph Knibbs =

English rugby union player

- Born: Ralph Andrew Knibbs; 3 August 1964 (age 62) Bristol, England
- Height: 6 ft 1 in (185 cm)
- Weight: 182 lb (83 kg)

Rugby union career
- Position: Centre
Amateur team(s)
Years	Team	Apps	(Points)
1996-	Clifton RFC		
Senior career
Years	Team	Apps	(Points)
1982–1996	Bristol RFC	436	(615)
Provincial / State sides
Years	Team	Apps	(Points)
–	Gloucestershire County RFU		
International career
Years	Team	Apps	(Points)
–	England Rugby U-23		

Ralph Andrew Knibbs is an English former rugby union player who played for Bristol.

== Rugby career ==
He made his debut as a seventeen-year-old against Pontypridd RFC in 1982, scoring with his first touch of the ball. Knibbs had a repertoire of running angles and scored many individual tries in his Bristol career which lasted until 1996. He played in the 1983 cup final as an eighteen-year-old, and represented Gloucestershire in all their games in the 1982/83 championship-winning campaign. He was also an accomplished basketball player, athlete and American football player before his rugby career. He played for the South West Division, England under-23s, and the England Sevens.

He turned down the chance to go on the 1984 England rugby union tour of South Africa, because of his opposition to apartheid. He also declared himself unavailable for 1988 England rugby union tour of Australia and Fiji, due to work commitments, making him one of the only players ever to turn down England national rugby union team twice. Despite this, Knibbs made 436 appearances for Bristol, scoring 123 tries, and was vice-captain during the centenary season. He later captained Clifton Rugby Football Club where he ended his career.

On 18 February 2007 Knibbs was also named in The Sunday Times top 10 centres of time along with names such as Brian O'Driscoll and Simon Halliday by Bath rival Jeremy Guscott who described Knibbs as being "silky and absolutely superb" and whom admitted it was a "crying shame he never won an England cap".

== 2016 attempted murder ==
On 22 March 2016 Knibbs was a victim of attempted murder by transgender fell runner Lauren Jeska, following an argument regarding test samples. Knibbs was stabbed several times in the head and neck by Jeska in a "premeditated and savage attack" at Alexander Stadium, in Birmingham. This resulted in life-threatening injuries and Knibbs suffering a stroke. The attack occurred in the context of a planned review of Jeska's status as a female athlete because she was a transgender woman. Jeska admitted attempted murder and was jailed for 18 years.

Knibbs sustained long-term nerve damage from the attack and the life-saving surgery he underwent afterwards. The stroke he suffered caused sight loss in both eyes and temporarily blinded him in one eye. He also has limited movement and difficulty eating owing to the severed nerves, and is disabled.

== Personal life ==
Knibbs was born in England to Jamaican parents who were part of the Windrush generation.
