= Francis Tate =

English antiquary and politician

Francis Tate (1560–1616) was an English antiquary and politician, Member of Parliament for Northampton and Shrewsbury.

== Life ==
Tate was born in 1560 at Gayton, the second son of Bartholomew Tate (d. 1601) of Delapre, Northamptonshire, by his wife Dorothy, daughter of Francis Tanfield of Gayton. On 20 December 1577 he matriculated as a commoner at Magdalen College, Oxford, but left the university without a degree and entered the Middle Temple. He was called to the bar in 1587, but devoted his attention mainly to antiquarian researches.

He was an original member of the Society of Antiquaries, and was for some time its secretary; a volume of collections by him (British Library Stowe MS 1045) is said to consist of matters discussed by the society. In 1601 Tate was returned to parliament for Northampton. On 22 February 1604 he was placed on commissions of the peace in the counties of Glamorgan, Brecknock, and Radnor, and from 1604 till 1611 he sat in parliament as member for Shrewsbury. In 1607 he was Lent reader in the Middle Temple, and about the same time was employed as justice itinerant in South Wales.

He died, unmarried, on 11 November 1616. Zouch Tate was son of Francis Tate's brother, Sir William Tate (d. 1617).

== Works ==
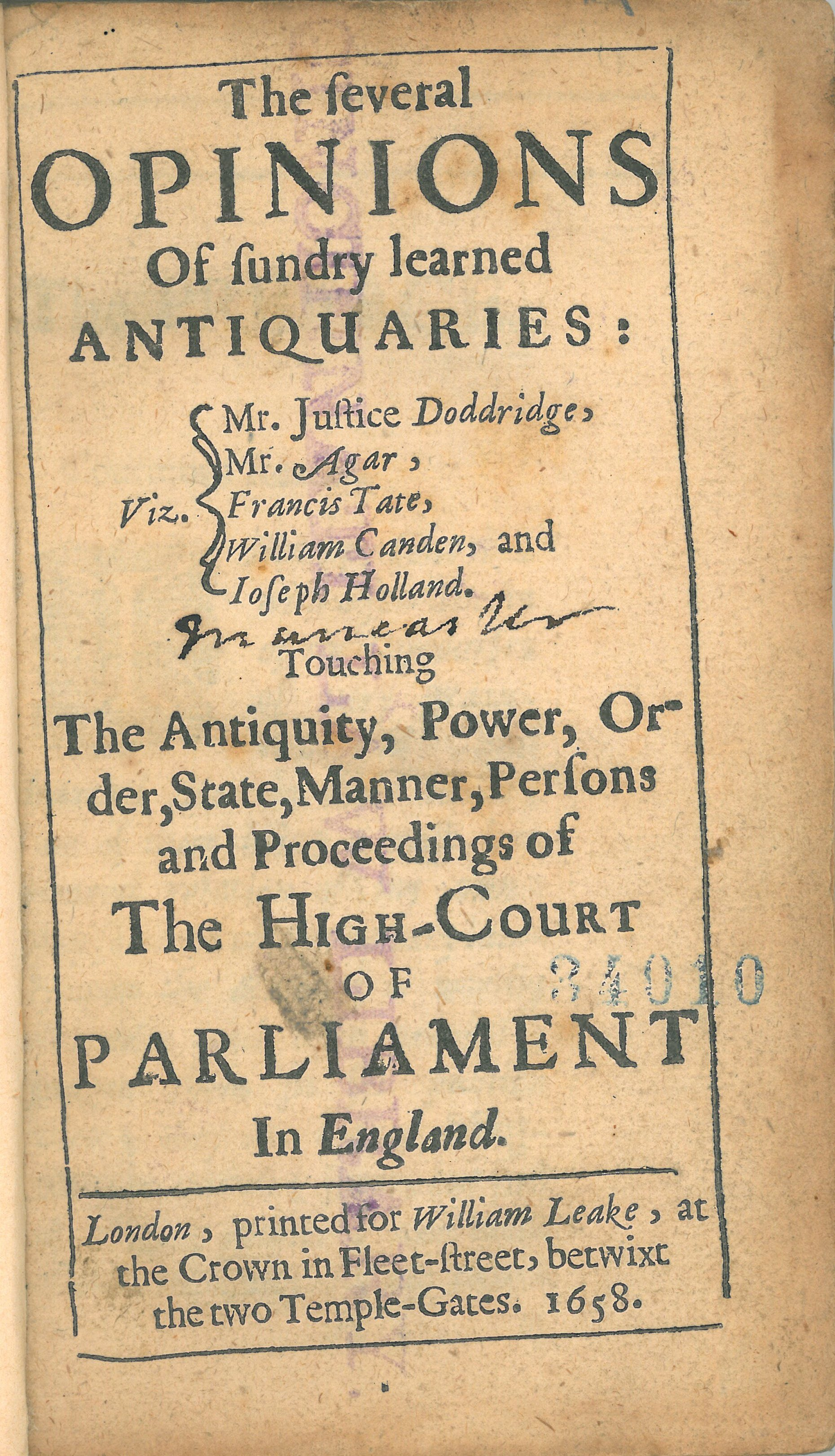
The title page of The Several Opinions of Sundry Learned Antiquaries (1658), the publication of which was arranged by John Dodderidge. Tate is named on the page as one of his treatises was published in the work.

Tate made antiquarian collections which were used by William Camden and others, but remained unpublished at his death. John Selden describes him as "multijugæ eruditionis et vetustatis peritissimus".

- His tract on The Antiquity, Use, and Privileges of Cities, Boroughs, and Towns, and his Antiquity, Use, and Ceremonies of laufull Combats in England, were both printed in John Gutch's Collectanea Curiosa, 1781, vol. i.
- His treatises on Knights made by Abbots, dated 21 June 1606; on the Antiquity of Arms in England, dated 2 November 1598; on the Antiquity, Variety, and Ceremonies of Funerals in England, dated 30 April 1600; on the Antiquity, Authority, and Succession of the High Steward of England, dated 4 June 1603, and his Questions about the Ancient Britons are all printed in Thomas Hearne's Curious Discourses, 1775.
- A treatise Of the Antiquity of Parliaments in England, is printed in The Several Opinions of Sundry Learned Antiquaries, the publication of which was arranged by John Dodderidge, 1658; and a similar Discourse importing the Assembly of Parliament is extant (Harleian MS. 253).
- His King Edward II's Household and Wardrobe Ordinances ... Englisht by F. Tate, was printed by the Chaucer Society in 1876 (2nd series, No. 14).
- Letters to Robert Bruce Cotton are extant in Cottonian MS. Julius C iii. ff. 97, 103, and to Camden in Julius F. vii. f. 288.
- Anthony Wood also mentions Nomina Hydarum in com. Northampton, as used by Augustine Vincent in his Survey of Northamptonshire, an Explanation of the abbreviated Words in Domesday Book, and a collection of Learned Speeches in Parliaments held in the latter end of Q. Elizabeth and in the Reign of K. James I, which have not been traced.

Copies of most of Tate's works are extant among the Stowe manuscripts in the British Museum.
