= List of County Court venues in England and Wales =

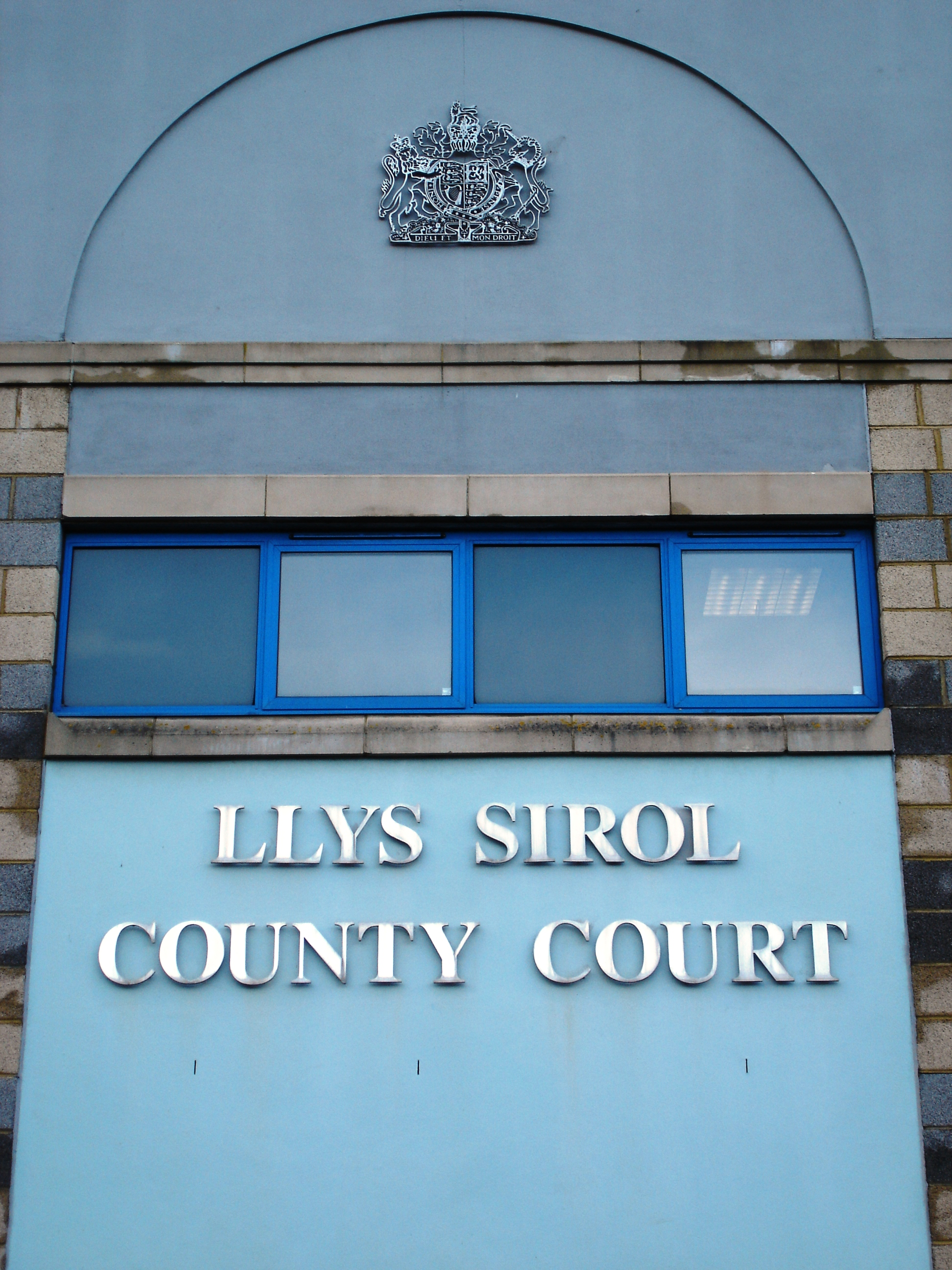
The bilingual (Welsh and English) sign at Pontypridd County Court

The County Court of England and Wales dates back to the County Courts Act 1846 (9 & 10 Vict. c. 95), which received royal assent on 28 August 1846 and was brought into force on 15 March 1847.

England and Wales (with the exception of the City of London, which was outside the scope of the Act) were divided into 60 circuits, with a total of 491 county courts within these circuits. The then Lord Chancellor, Lord Cottenham, wanted everyone to be within seven miles of a court, and the final scheme came close to that aim. One county court judge was appointed to each circuit, assisted by one or more registrars with some limited judicial powers, and would travel between the courts in his area as necessary, sitting in each court at least once a month. Few permanent courts were needed initially, given the infrequency of court hearings, and temporary accommodation such as a town hall would often be used where there was no existing courthouse for use. In some places, a building is now shared with the Crown Court (as at Maidstone Combined Court Centre, for example), the Family Court, or a magistrates' court. The judicial business of the County Court is now carried out by circuit judges (a term introduced by the Courts Act 1971) and district judges (as the post of registrar was renamed by section 74 of the Courts and Legal Services Act 1990). Part-time judges (recorders, deputy district judges and some retired judges) also sit in the county court. As at 1 April 2015, there are 640 circuit judges and 441 district judges.

The system of 60 circuits was abolished in 1970. Over time, whilst new courts have been opened in various locations, there has been an overall reduction in the number of locations where a county court is held. In June 2010, the Ministry of Justice announced plans to close 54 county courts and 103 magistrates' courts, in order to save £15m in annual running costs and £22m in necessary maintenance. After consultation, it was decided to keep five of these county courts open: Barnsley, Bury, Llangefni, the Mayor's and City of London Court, and Skipton. From 22 April 2014, the Crime and Courts Act 2013 replaced the previous system of county courts for different localities with one County Court that operates throughout England and Wales, sitting in multiple locations simultaneously. In July 2015, further proposals to close nineteen County Court venues were announced.

All name changes before 1 August 1983 reflect changes in the locations where the court sat. Before then, a county court with more than one location in its title would sit at each location named. The obligation for one court to sit in multiple locations was removed by the Civil Courts Order 1983. Instead, it was specified that a county court was to be held at each location named in the order and courts were to be named after that one location (save for a few exceptions where the name of a former court town was retained in the court's title, such as the Aldershot and Farnham County Court).

On 22 April 2014 the various county courts were merged into one single County Court for England and Wales, and since then the venues have been referred as, for example, "the County Court at Exeter" instead of "Exeter County Court" as previously.

== Venues ==
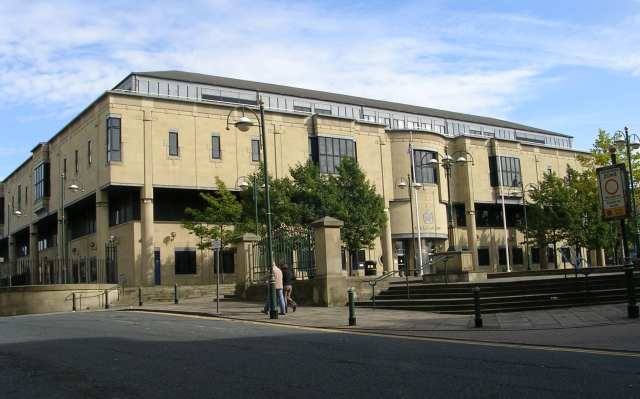
Bradford Law Courts

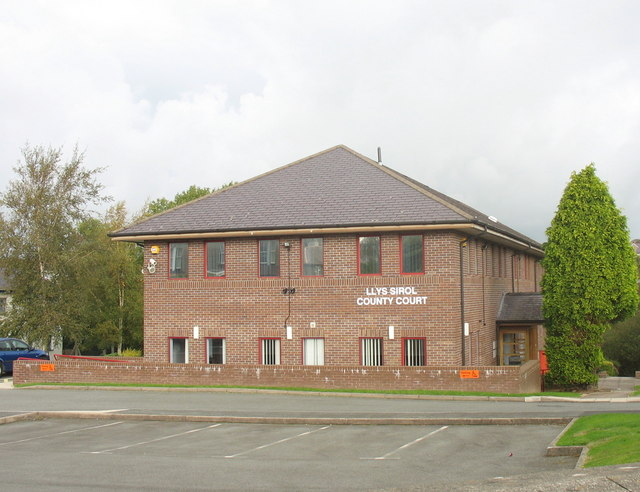
The County Court at Caernarfon

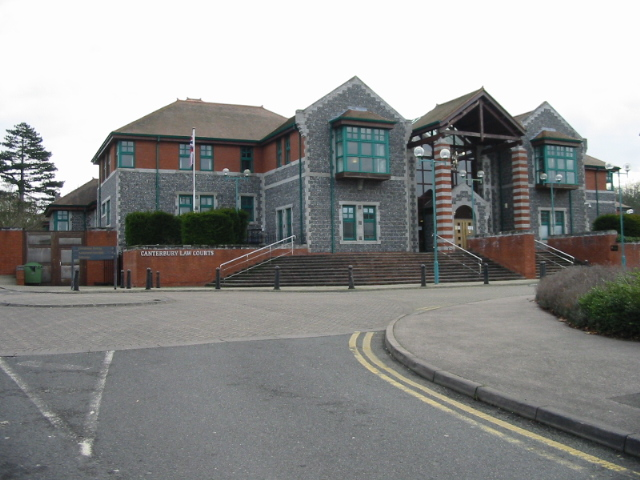
Canterbury Law Courts

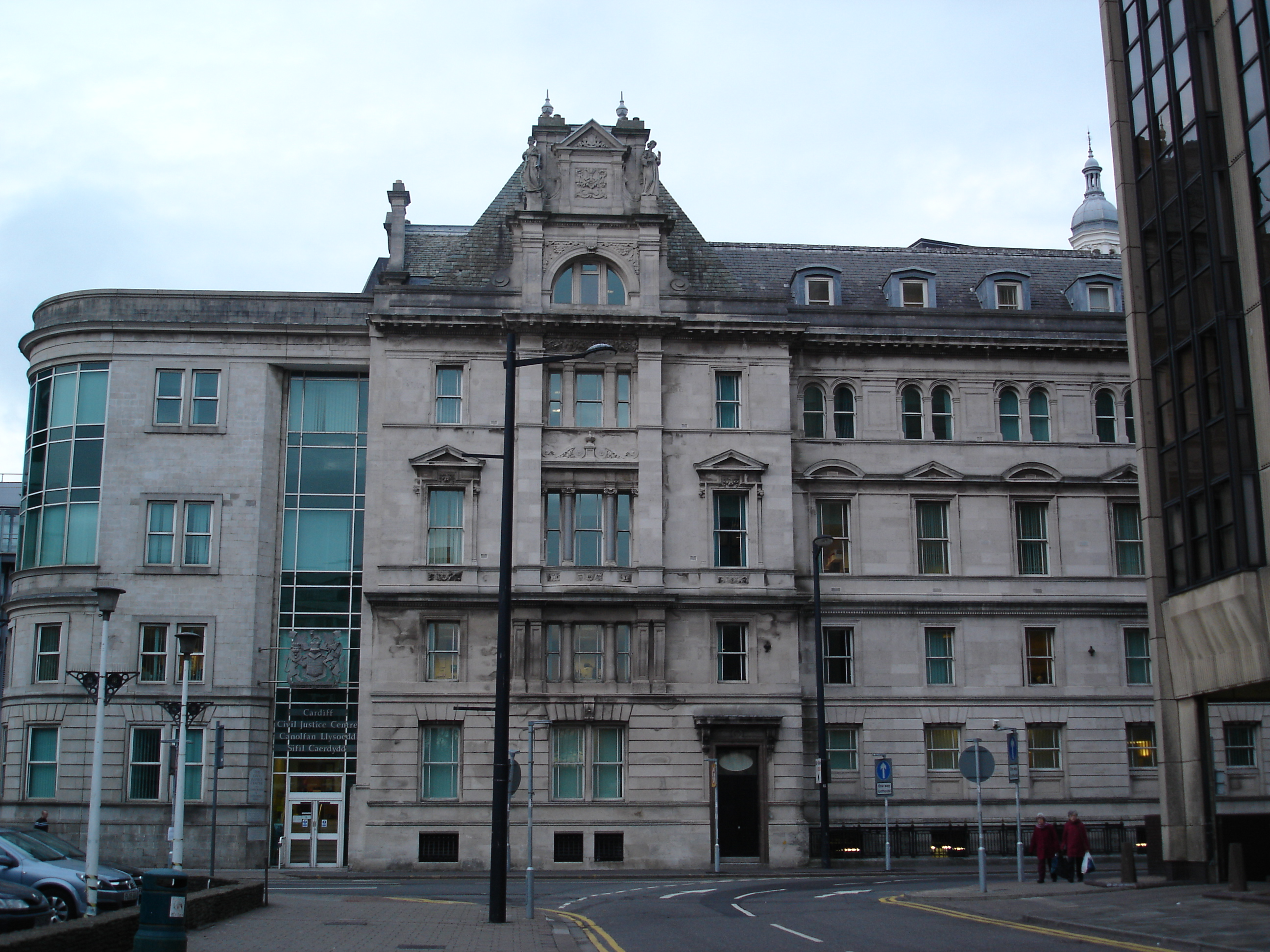
Cardiff Civil Justice Centre

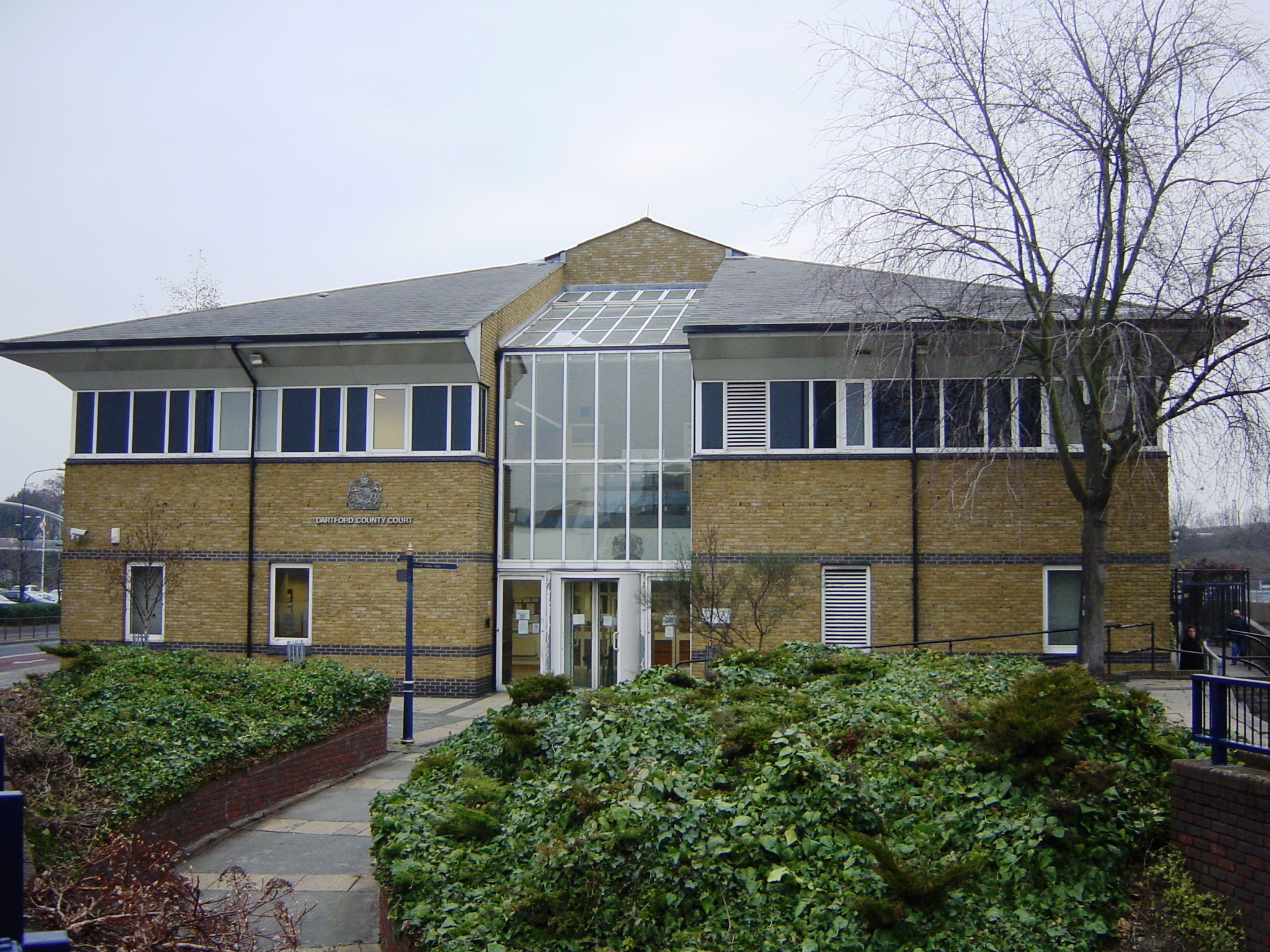
The County Court at Dartford

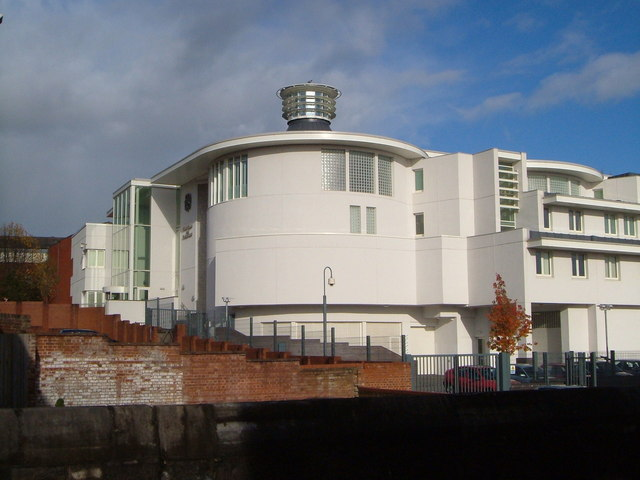
Exeter Law Courts

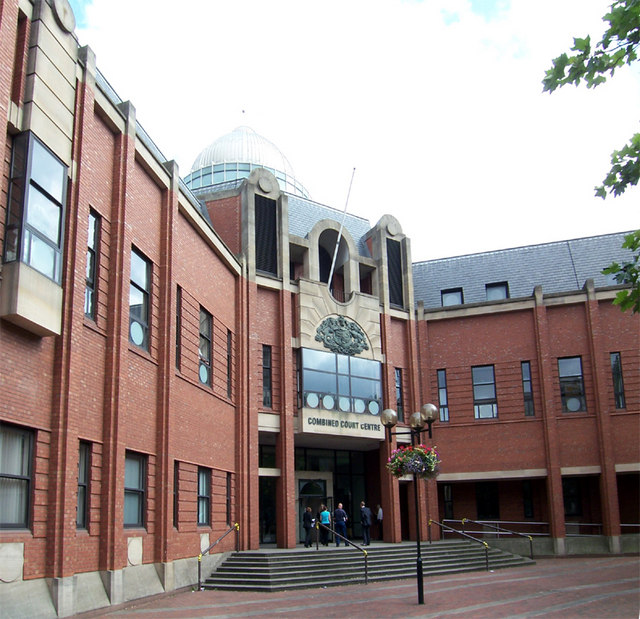
Kingston upon Hull Combined Court Centre

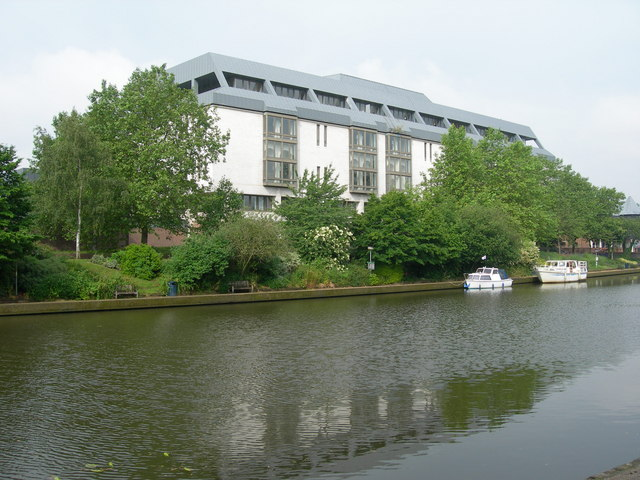
Maidstone Law Courts

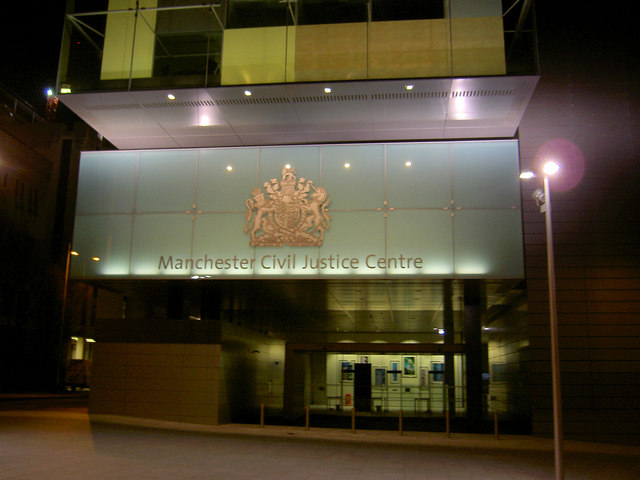
Manchester Civil Justice Centre, which opened in October 2007, houses the County Court at Manchester.

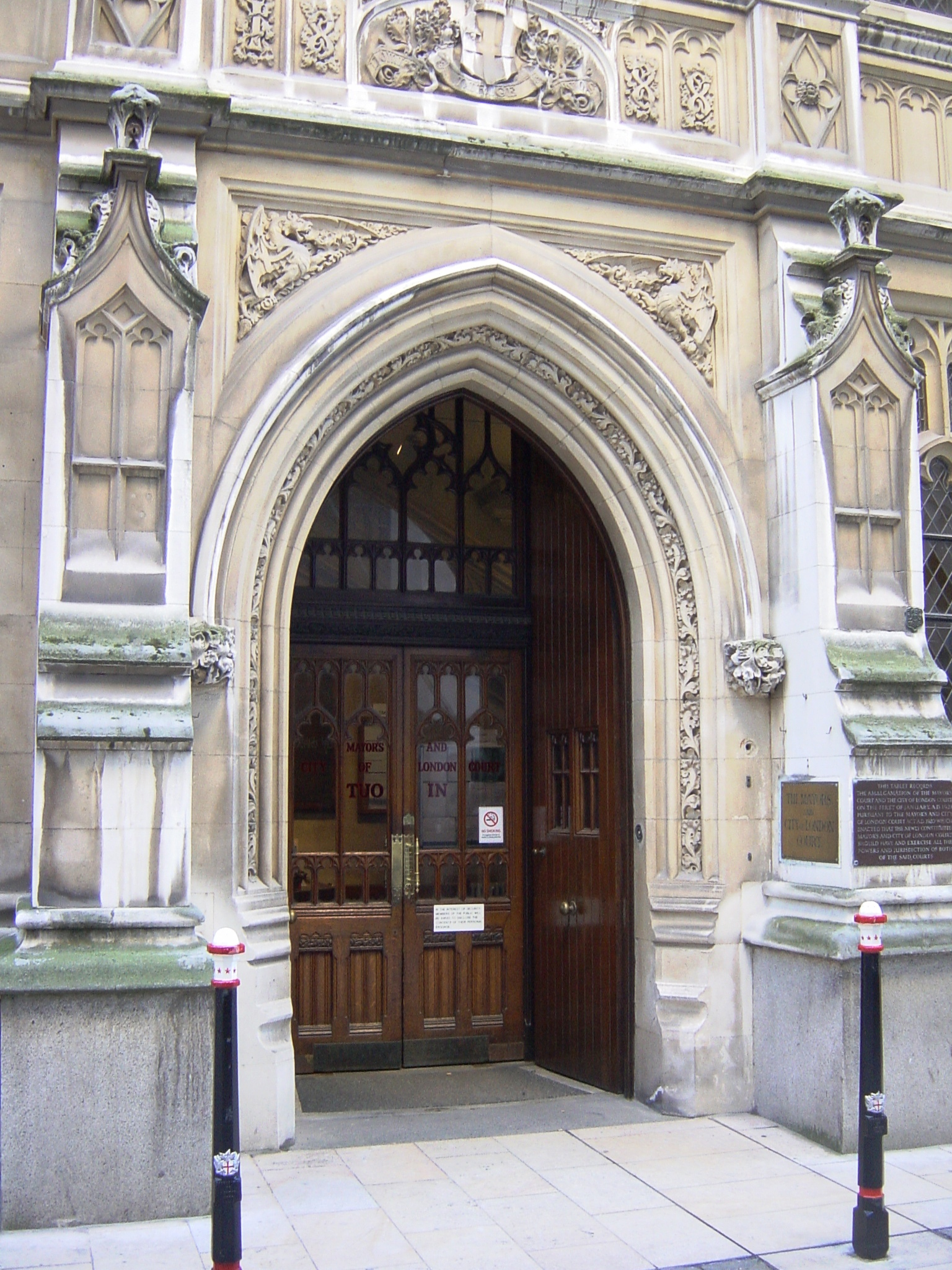
The entrance to the Mayor's and City of London Court

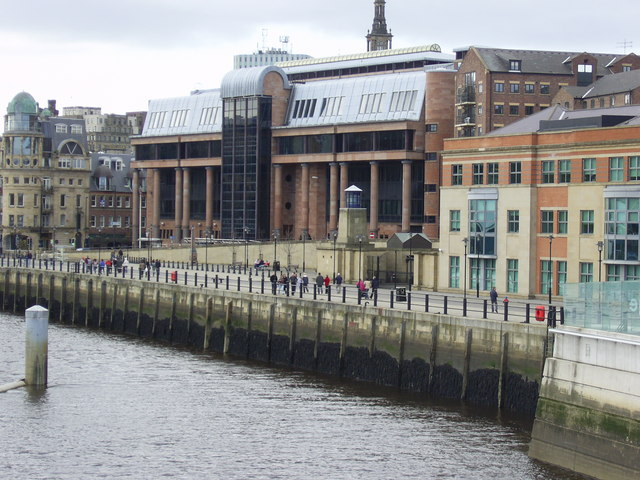
Newcastle Law Courts

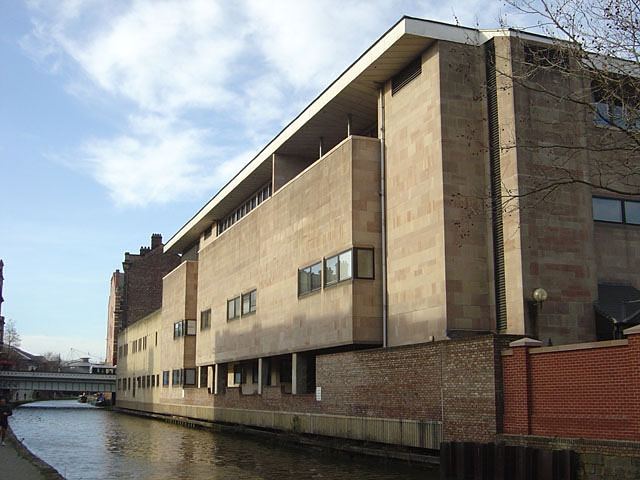
The County Court at Nottingham shares a building with Nottingham Crown Court.

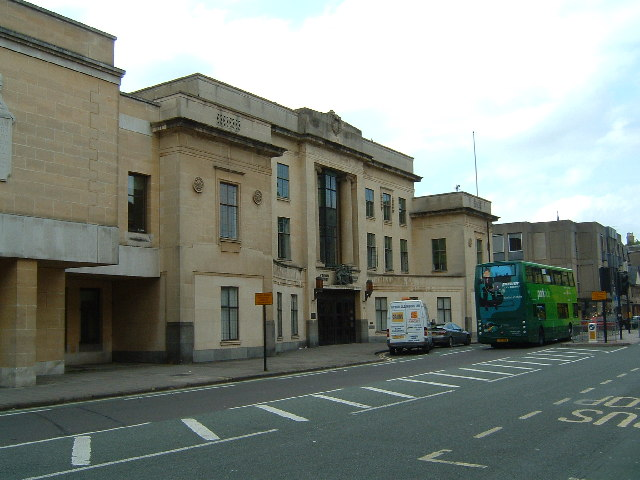
Oxford Combined Court Centre

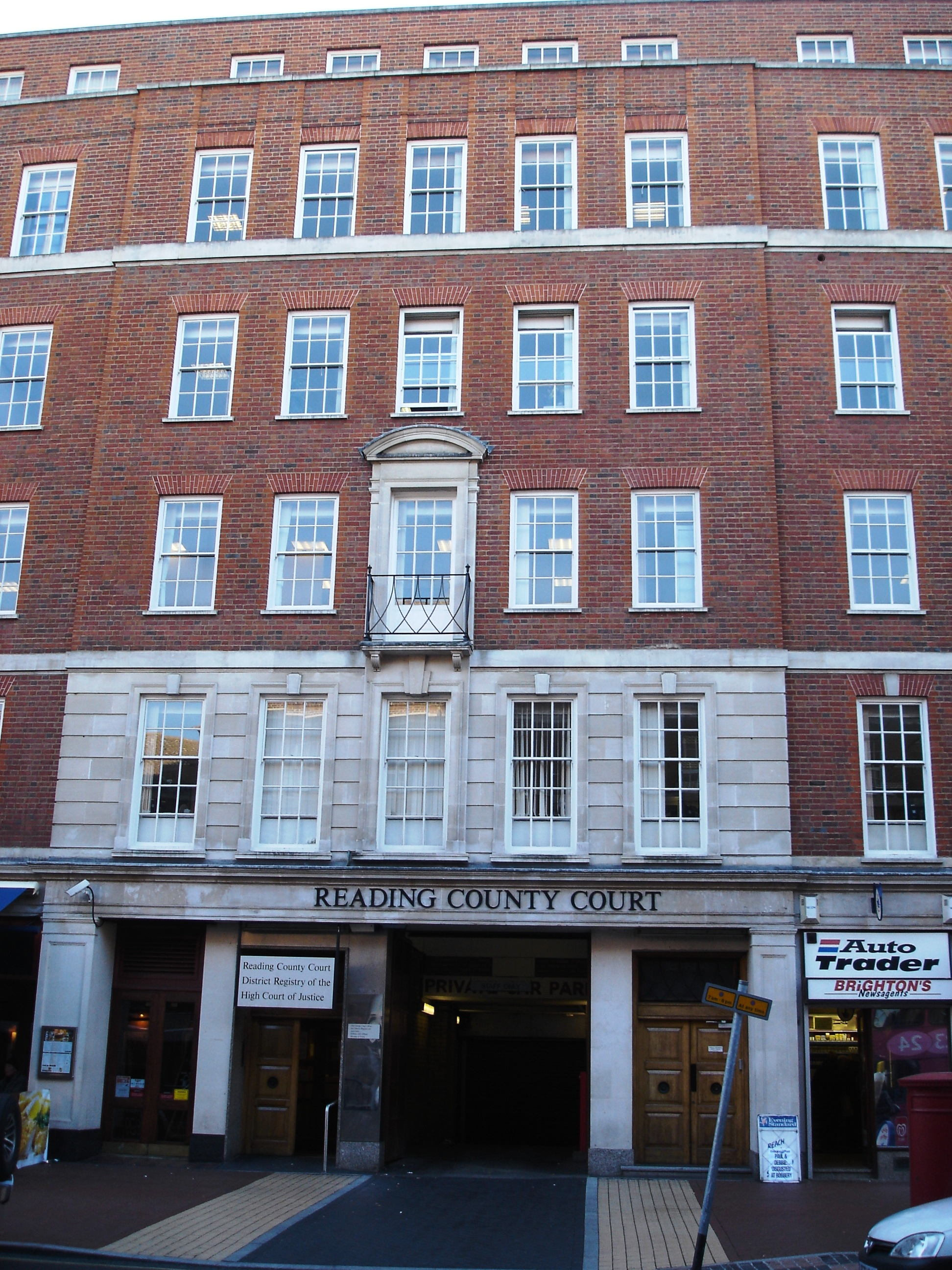
The County Court at Reading

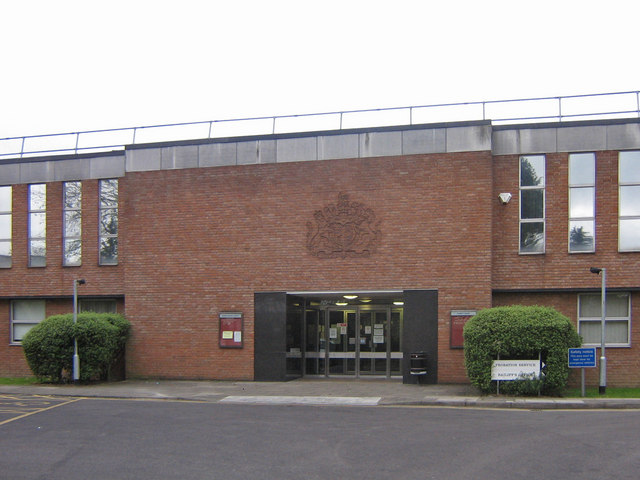
The County Court at Reigate shares the building with Redhill Magistrates' Court.

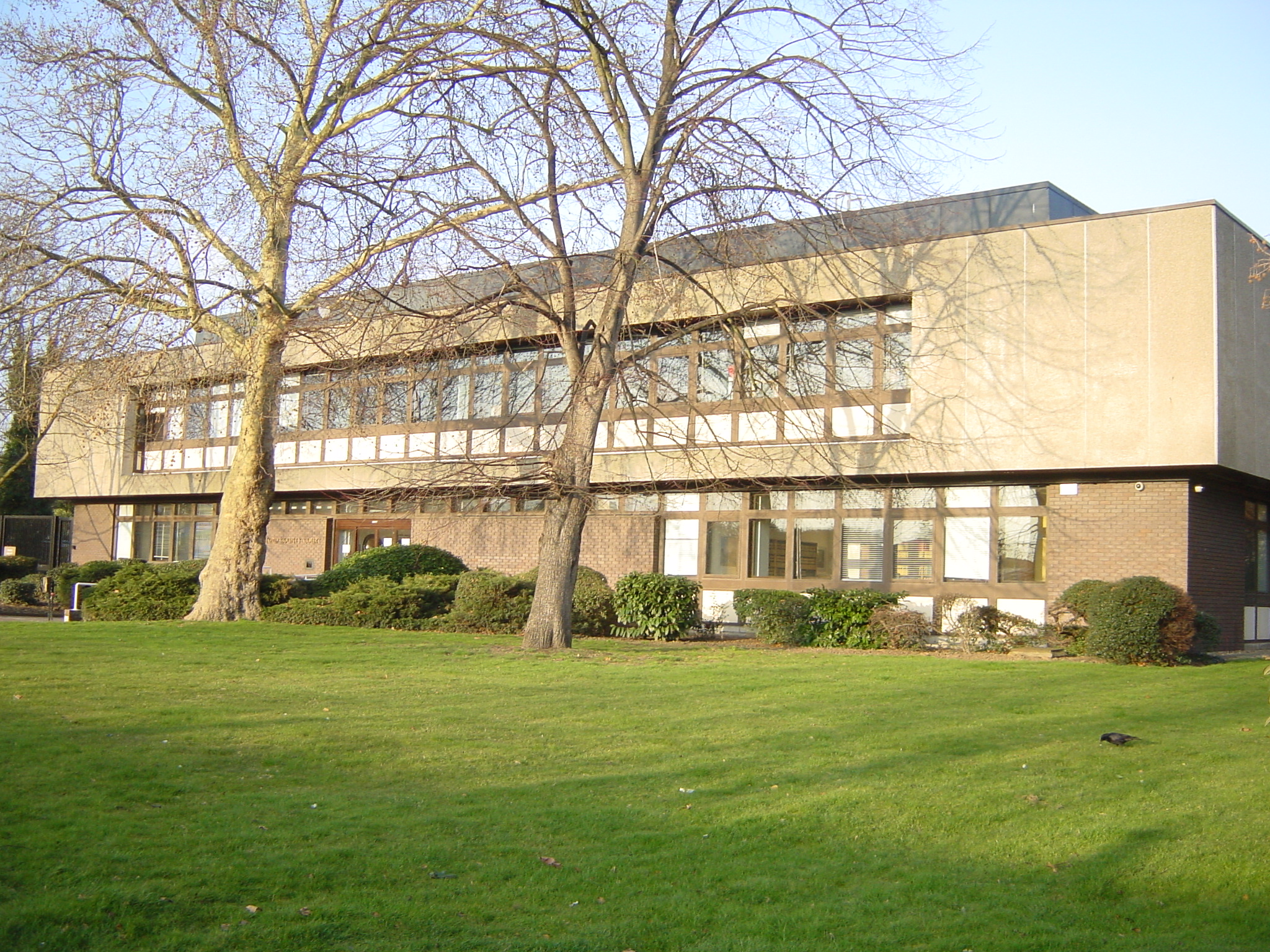
The County Court at Romford

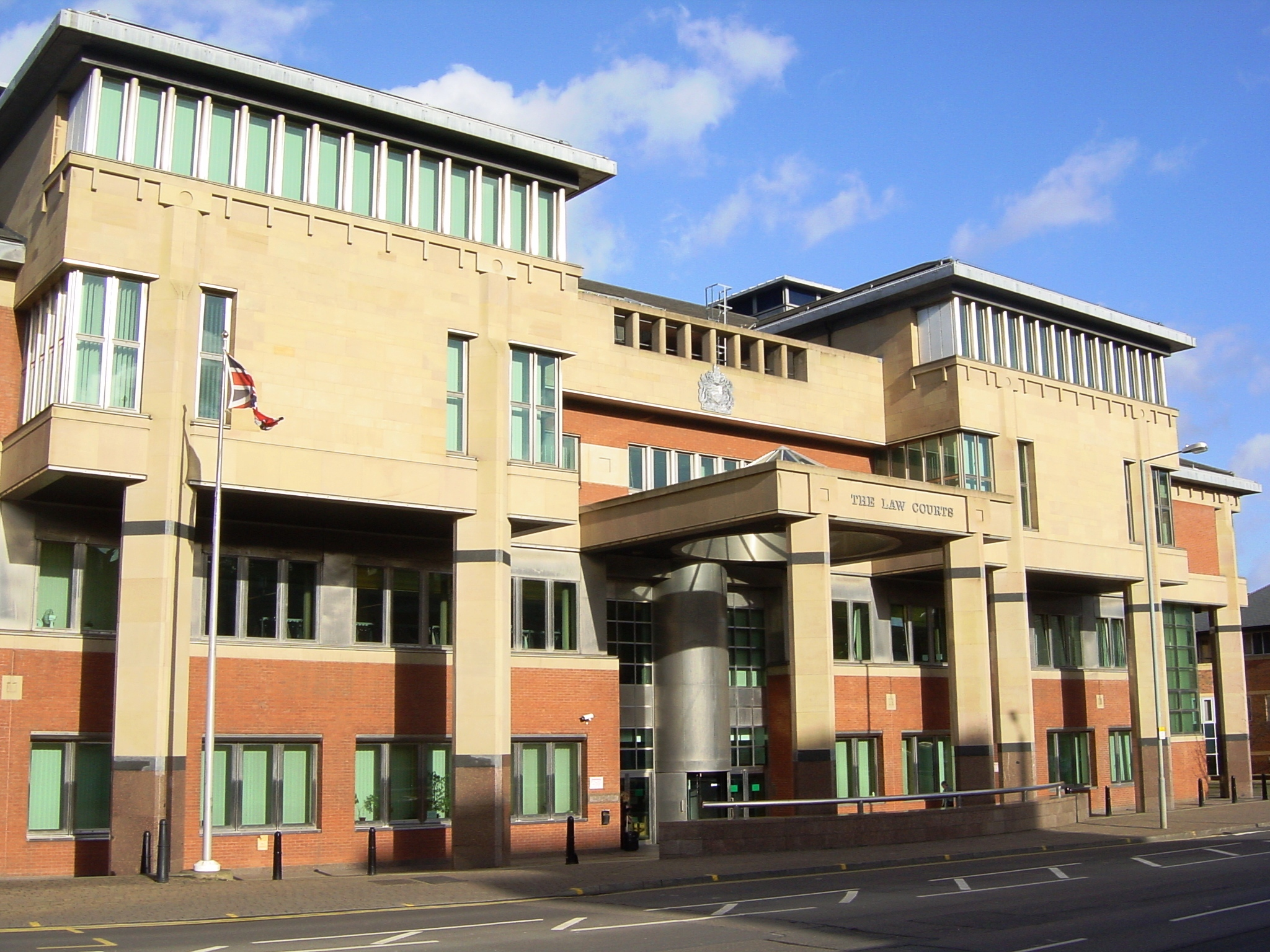
Sheffield Law Courts

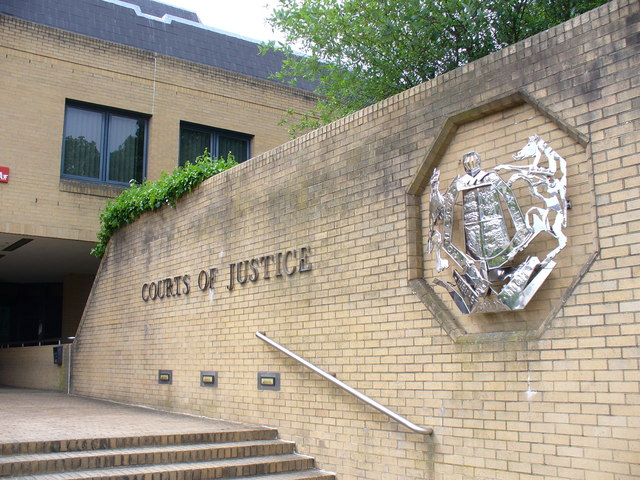
Southampton Courts of Justice

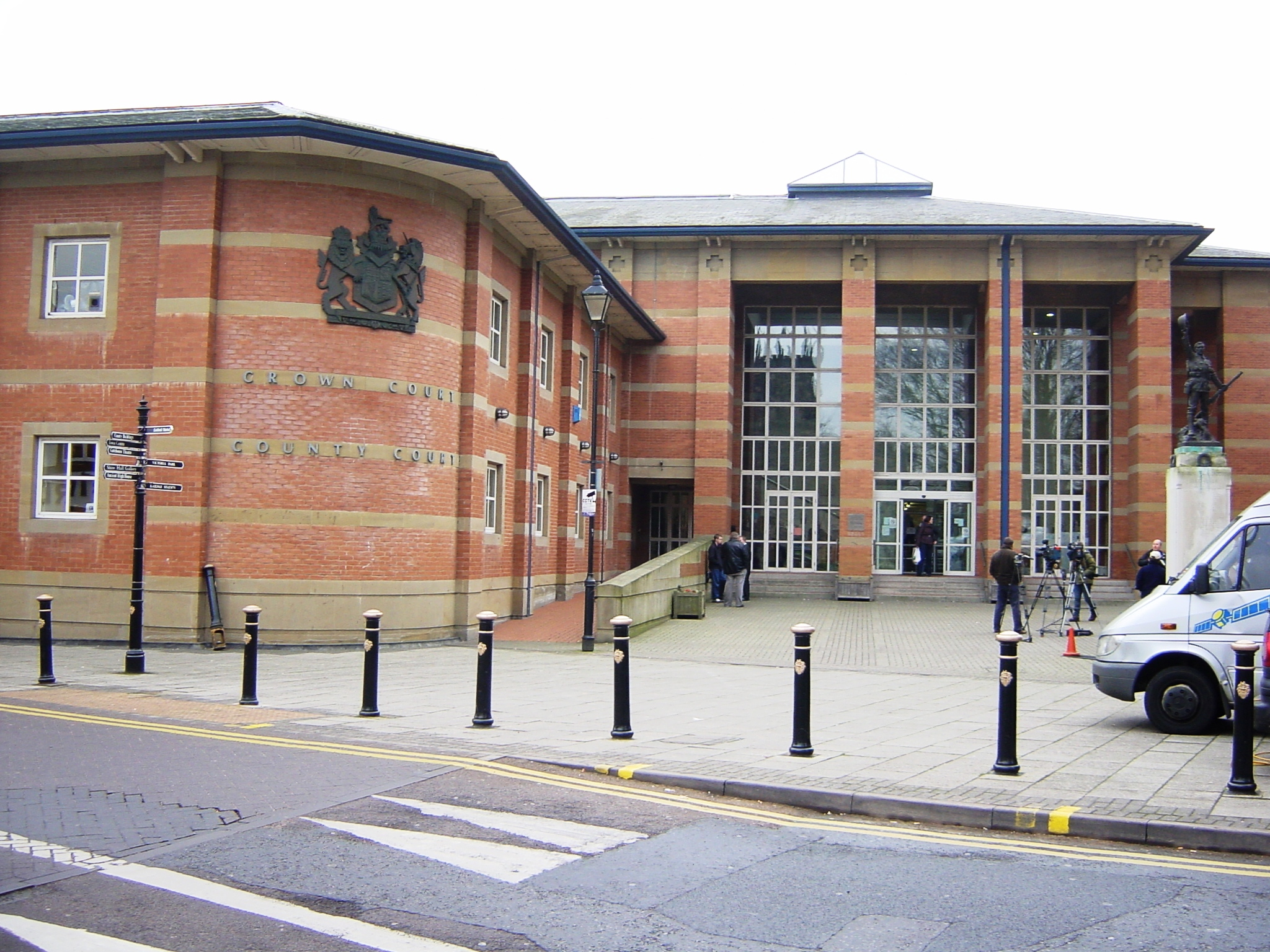
Stafford Combined Court Centre

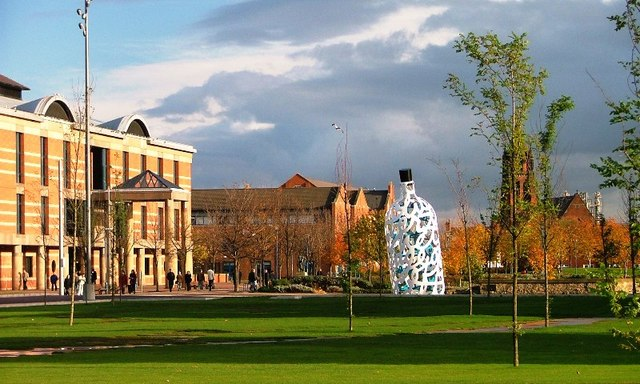
Teesside Combined Court Centre

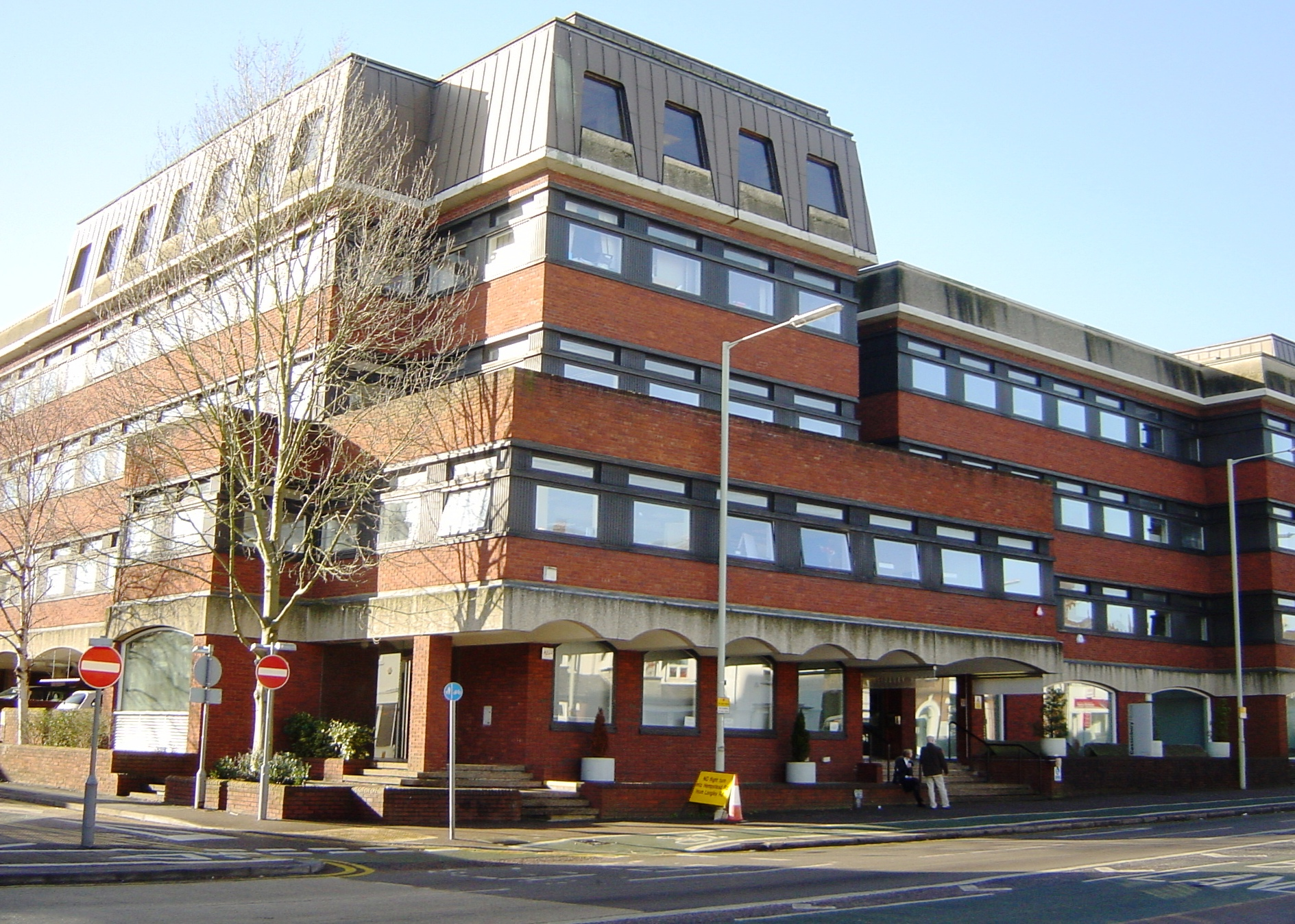
The County Court at Watford is on the third and fourth floor of this office building.

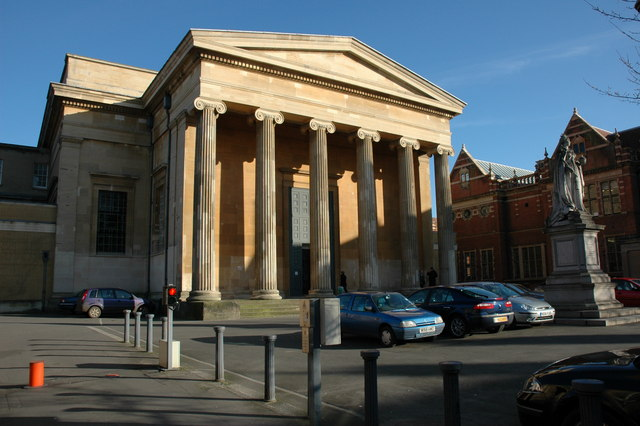
The Shire Hall, Worcester, where the crown and county courts for the area are based

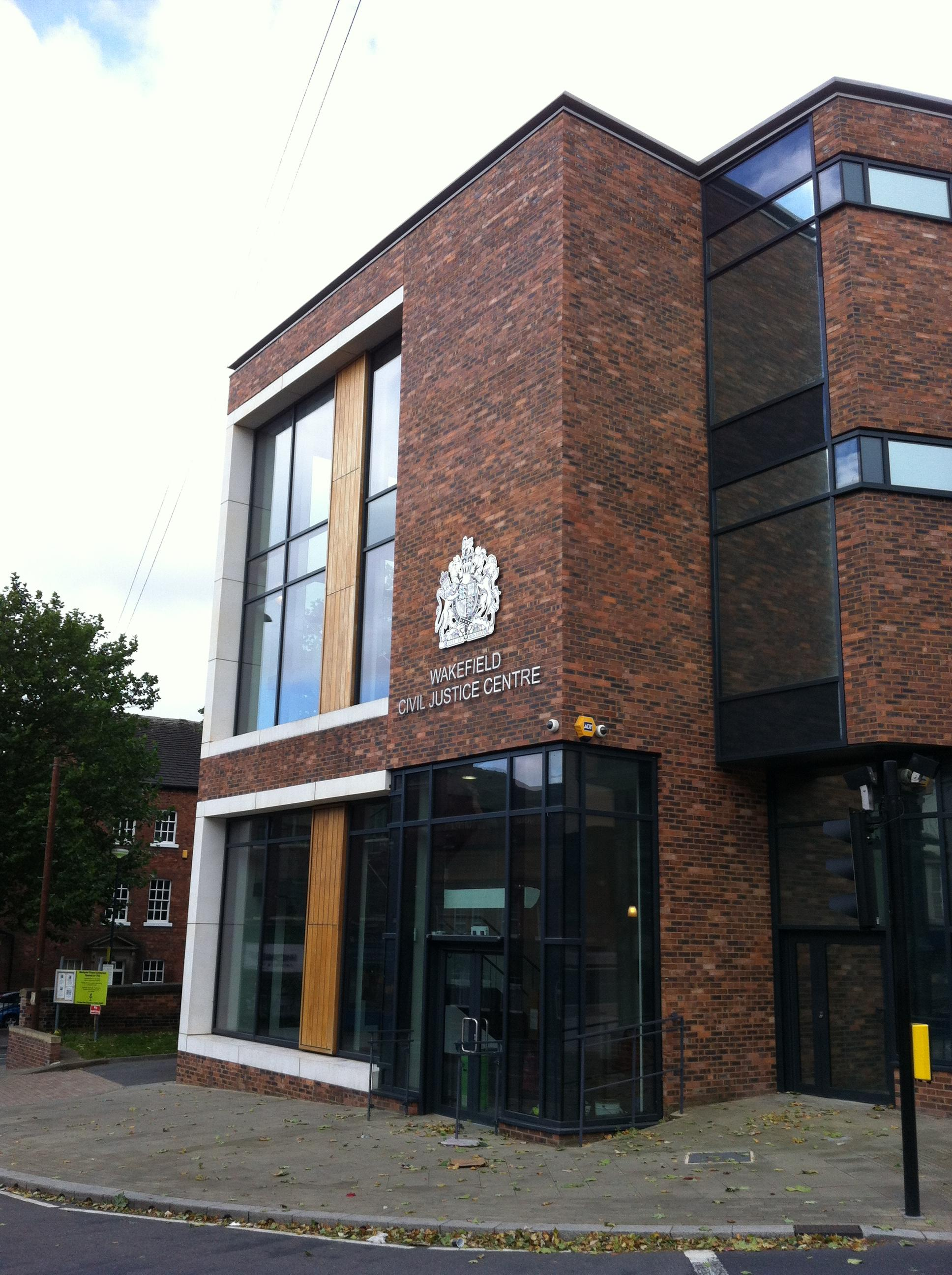
Wakefield Civil Justice Centre

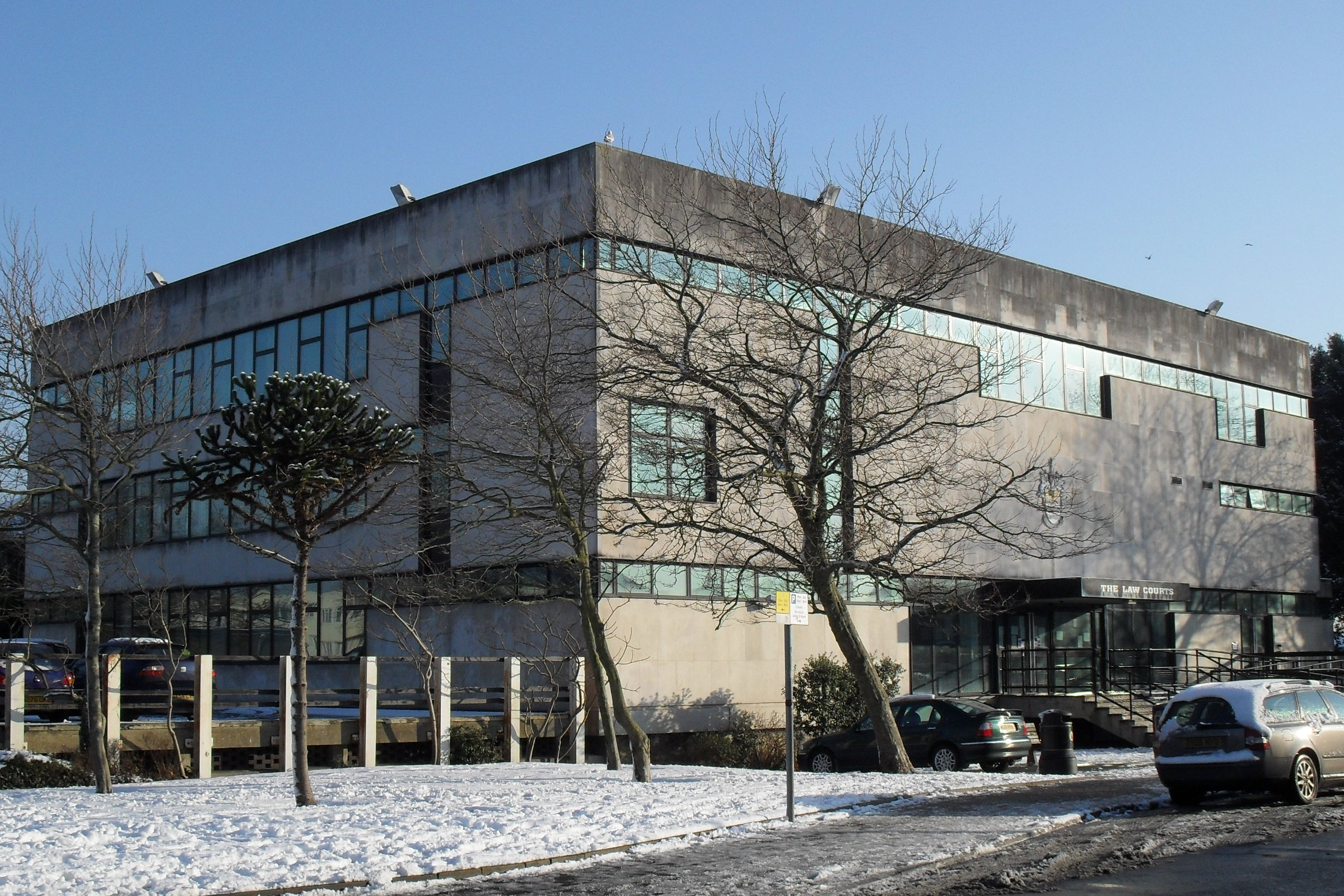
Worthing Law Courts

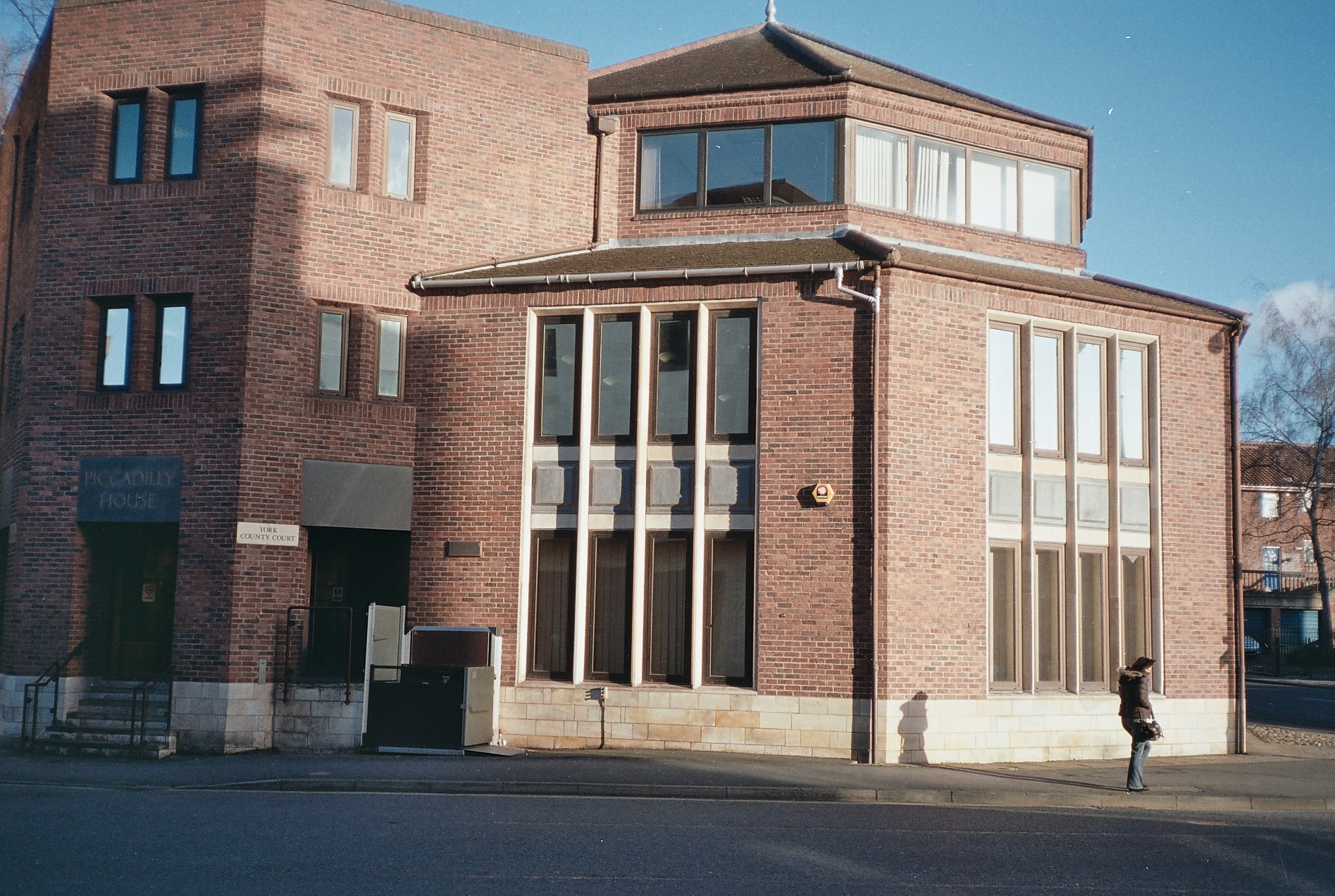
The County Court at York

Until 1 January 1937, when the County Court Districts (Name of Court) Order 1936 (SR&O 1936/1131) came into force, the full title of each court was The County Court of (county) holden at (location/locations), using the historic county names for England and for Wales. Thereafter, each court was renamed as (location/s) County Court. For brevity, the latter form is used throughout in this table, and "County Court" is abbreviated to "CC".

Name	Date of opening	Court region	Notes and references
Aberystwyth	15 March 1847	Wales	Shares a building with the local magistrates' court
Accrington	31 December 1858	North West	Opened as part of Haslingden and Accrington CC. Renamed Accrington CC on 1 April 1920. The closure of the court was proposed by the Ministry of Justice in July 2015.
Aldershot and Farnham (located in Aldershot)	28 February 1874	South West	Aldershot CC was opened as part of Farnham and Aldershot CC. Farnham and Aldershot were made separate court districts on 1 July 1952 and both courts were renamed accordingly. Farnham CC was reconsolidated with Aldershot CC on 1 April 1968. The Ministry of Justice announced a proposal in July 2015 to move the court to the same building as the local magistrates' court.
Altrincham	15 March 1847	North West	Shares a building with Trafford Magistrates' Court. The closure of the court was proposed by the Ministry of Justice in July 2015.
Aylesbury	15 March 1847	South East	The closure of the court was proposed by the Ministry of Justice in July 2015.
Banbury	15 March 1847	South East	
Barnet	15 March 1847	London	Consolidated with St Albans CC as Barnet and St Albans CC on 1 October 1917. Both were reconstituted as separate courts on 1 April 1922. The court building also houses the magistrates' family court work for the area, the building being called Barnet Civil and Family Courts Centre.
Barnsley	15 March 1847	North East	
Barnstaple	15 March 1847	South West	The court is located in Barnstaple Civic Centre.
Barrow-in-Furness	30 June 1873	North West	Opened as part of Barrow-in-Furness and Ulverston CC. The obligation to sit in Ulverston was removed on 1 August 1983. The court was renamed Barrow-in-Furness CC on 28 May 1986. The court shares a building with Barrow-in-Furness Magistrates' Court.
Basildon	29 December 1995	South East	Created by the relocation and renaming of Brentwood CC. Shares a building with Basildon Crown Court.
Basingstoke	15 March 1847	South West	
Bath	15 March 1847	South West	
Bedford	15 March 1847	South East	The closure of the court was proposed by the Ministry of Justice in July 2015.
Birkenhead	15 March 1847	North West	
Birmingham	15 March 1847	Midlands	Building known as Birmingham Civil Justice Centre since High Court civil cases are also heard here.
Blackburn	15 March 1847	North West	Renamed Blackburn and Clitheroe CC on 3 July 1923. Renamed Blackburn CC on 1 March 1944.
Blackpool	30 September 1881	North West	Replaced Poulton-le-Fylde CC. Renamed Blackpool and Fleetwood CC on 2 January 1911. Renamed Blackpool CC on 1 January 1920.
Blackwood	24 January 1949	Wales	Opened as part of Tredegar, Blackwood, Abertillery and Bargoed CC. Renamed Blackwood, Tredegar and Abertillery CC on 1 April 1953 when Bargoed CC was made a separate court. Renamed Blackwood CC on 1 July 1976. The magistrates' family court work for the area is also based here, the building being called Blackwood Civil and Family Court.
Bodmin	15 March 1847	South West	Also sat in Liskeard after Liskeard CC closed on 1 April 1982. This continued until 5 December 1994.
Bolton	15 March 1847	North West	Shares a building with Bolton Crown Court. The closure of the court was proposed by the Ministry of Justice in July 2015.
Boston	15 March 1847	Midlands	Shares a building with Boston Magistrates' Court.
Bournemouth and Poole (located in Bournemouth)	30 June 1875	South West	Opened as part of Christchurch and Bournemouth CC. Renamed Bournemouth CC on 31 January 1920. Consolidated with Poole CC on 1 July 1920 as Bournemouth and Poole CC. Both were reconstituted as separate court districts on 1 July 1932. Shares a building with Bournemouth Crown Court. Renamed Bournemouth and Poole when the court in Poole closed on 4 July 2011.
Bow	15 March 1847	London	The closure of the court was proposed by the Ministry of Justice in July 2015.
Bradford	15 March 1847	North East	Shares a building with Bradford Crown Court.
Brecon	15 March 1847	Wales	Shares a building with Brecon Magistrates' Court. The closure of the court was proposed by the Ministry of Justice in July 2015.
Brentford	15 March 1847	London	
Bridgend	15 March 1847	Wales	Shares a building with Bridgend Magistrates' Court. The closure of the court was proposed by the Ministry of Justice in July 2015.
Brighton	15 March 1847	South East	Renamed Brighton and Lewes CC on 1 October 1919 (Lewes having previously been part of Eastbourne and Lewes CC). Renamed Brighton CC when Lewes CC was made a separate court on 1 July 1951. The court adjoins Brighton Magistrates' Court.
Bristol	15 March 1847	South West	Also sat in Thornbury and Wells for a time after Thornbury CC and Wells CC closed on 1 April 1982, the name remaining Bristol CC.
Bromley	15 March 1847	London	
Burnley	15 March 1847	North West	Shares a building with Burnley Crown Court
Bury	15 March 1847	North West	Shares a building with Bury Magistrates' Court. The closure of the court was proposed by the Ministry of Justice in July 2015.
Bury St Edmunds	15 March 1847	South East	Also sat in Thetford for a time after Thetford CC closed on 1 January 1974, the name remaining Bury St Edmunds CC.
Buxton	30 June 1871	Midlands	Opened as part of Chapel-en-le-Frith and Buxton CC. Renamed Chapel-en-le-Frith, Buxton and New Mills CC on 28 February 1880. Renamed Buxton and New Mills CC on 1 November 1931. Renamed Buxton CC on 1 October 1955. Shares a building with Buxton Magistrates' Court. The closure of the court was proposed by the Ministry of Justice in July 2015.
Caernarfon	15 March 1847	Wales	The Ministry of Justice announced a proposal in July 2015 to move the court to the same building as the local crown and magistrates' court.
Cambridge	15 March 1847	South East	
Canterbury	15 March 1847	South East	Shares a building with Canterbury Crown Court.
Cardiff	15 March 1847	Wales	Consolidated with Barry CC on 26 September 1932 as Cardiff and Barry CC. Renamed Cardiff CC when Barry was recreated as a separate court on 1 October 1959. The building is known as Cardiff Civil Justice Centre since High Court civil cases are also heard here.
Carlisle	15 March 1847	North West	Consolidated with Wigton on 1 October 1966 as Carlisle and Wigton CC. Renamed Carlisle CC on 1 October 1968. Shares a building with Carlisle Crown Court.
Carmarthen	15 March 1847	Wales	Renamed Carmarthen, Llandilo and Ammanford CC on 1 November 1918. Renamed Carmarthen and Ammanford CC on 1 March 1944. Renamed Carmarthen CC when Ammanford was made a separate court on 1 April 1953. Court hearings are held at the Carmarthen Guildhall, as are hearings of Carmarthen Crown Court. The closure of the court was proposed by the Ministry of Justice in July 2015.
Central London	24 August 1992	London	Formed by the closure and relocation of Westminster CC and Bloomsbury CC. Based at the Royal Courts of Justice
Chelmsford	15 March 1847	South East	The building is shared with the magistrates' family court work for the area and is called Chelmsford County and Family Proceedings Court.
Chester	15 March 1847	North West	Building known as Chester Civil Justice Centre since High Court civil cases are also heard here.
Chesterfield	15 March 1847	Midlands	The Ministry of Justice announced a proposal in July 2015 to move the court to the same building as the local magistrates' court.
Chichester	15 March 1847	South East	Also sat in Petworth and Arundel for a time after these courts were consolidated with Chichester (on 1 October 1968 and 1 April 1969 respectively), the name remaining Chichester CC throughout. Shares a building with Chichester Crown Court. The closure of the court was proposed by the Ministry of Justice in July 2015.
Chippenham and Trowbridge (located in Chippenham)	25 March 2013	South West	A county court had been held in Trowbridge between 1847 and 2013, when it closed, but its name is preserved in the replacement court that opened in Chippenham. The closure of the court was proposed by the Ministry of Justice in July 2015.
Clerkenwell and Shoreditch (located in Islington)	6 July 2006	London	Created by the closure and merger of Clerkenwell CC and Shoreditch CC. The Gee Street courthouse, as it is sometimes called, also handles some High Court Family Division cases.
Colchester	15 March 1847	South East	Renamed Colchester and Clacton CC on 1 January 1908. Consolidated with Harwich CC on 1 January 1912 as Colchester, Clacton and Harwich CC. Consolidated with Halstead CC on 1 April 1917 as Colchester, Clacton, Harwich and Halstead CC. Renamed Colchester, Clacton and Halstead CC on 1 January 1927 when Harwich CC was made a separate court. Renamed Colchester and Clacton CC on 2 October 1950. Renamed Colchester CC on 5 April 1994. The closure of the court was proposed by the Ministry of Justice in July 2015.
Conwy and Colwyn (located in Llandudno)	15 March 1847	Wales	Conway CC was renamed Conway and Llandudno CC on 30 September 1878. Renamed Conway, Llandudno and Colwyn Bay CC on 2 August 1910. Renamed Colwyn Bay CC (located in Conwy) on 1 July 1976. Replaced by Conwy and Colwyn CC (located in Colwyn Bay) on 1 October 1984. Shares a building with the magistrates' court in Llandudno
Coventry	15 March 1847	Midlands	Shares a building with Coventry Crown Court
Crewe	31 December 1858	North West	Opened as part of Nantwich and Crewe CC. Renamed Nantwich, Crewe and Sandbach on 1 July 1933 when Sandbach ceased to be part of Congleton and Sandbach CC. Renamed Nantwich and Crewe CC on 1 April 1939. Renamed Crewe CC on 2 January 1961.
Croydon	15 March 1847	London	Shares a building with Croydon Crown Court.
Darlington	15 March 1847	North East	
Dartford	15 March 1847	South East	
Derby	15 March 1847	Midlands	Renamed Derby and Long Eaton CC on 1 July 1898. Renamed Derby CC on 1 October 1959. Shares a building with Derby Crown Court.
Doncaster	15 March 1847	North East	The Ministry of Justice announced a proposal in July 2015 to move the court to the same building as the local magistrates' court.
Dudley	15 March 1847	Midlands	
Durham	15 March 1847	North East	
Eastbourne	28 February 1878	South East	Opened as part of Eastbourne and Lewes CC. Renamed Eastbourne CC on 1 October 1919 when Lewes became part of Brighton and Lewes CC. Shares a building with Eastbourne Magistrates' Court. The closure of the court was proposed by the Ministry of Justice in July 2015.
Edmonton	15 March 1847	London	Renamed Edmonton and Wood Green CC on 1 July 1898. Renamed Edmonton CC on 1 July 1935.
Exeter	15 March 1847	South West	Also sat in Tiverton for a time after Tiverton CC closed on 1 April 1982, the name remaining Exeter CC. Shares a building with Exeter Crown Court.
Gateshead	15 March 1847	North East	
Gloucester and Cheltenham (located in Gloucester)	15 March 1847	South West	Cheltenham County Court closed, and the court at Gloucester was renamed, on 4 July 2011
Great Grimsby	15 March 1847	North East	Shares a building with Great Grimsby Crown Court.
Guildford	15 March 1847	South East	Consolidated with Godalming CC as Guildford and Godalming CC on 17 January 1871. Renamed Guildford CC on 1 January 1925. Shares a building with Guildford Magistrates' Court. Guildford Crown Court sits in another building nearby.
Halifax	15 March 1847	North East	The closure of the court was proposed by the Ministry of Justice in July 2015.
Hammersmith	15 March 1847	London	Originally called Brompton CC, it was renamed West London (Brompton) CC on 1 December 1908 Renamed West London CC on 1 January 1937. Renamed from the County Court at West London to the County Court at Hammersmith on 1 October 2014. The closure of the court was proposed by the Ministry of Justice in July 2015. Shares a building with West London Magistrates' Court.
Harrogate	1 February 1913	North East	Replaced Knaresborough CC. The Ministry of Justice announced a proposal in July 2015 to move the court to the same building as the local magistrates' court.
Hartlepool	15 March 1847	North East	Shares a building with Hartlepool Magistrates' Court. The closure of the court was proposed by the Ministry of Justice in July 2015.
Hastings	15 March 1847	South East	Shares a building with Hastings Magistrates' Court.
Haverfordwest	15 March 1847	Wales	Renamed Haverfordwest and Fishguard CC on 31 December 1848. Renamed Haverfordwest CC on 25 October 1856. Consolidated as part of Pembroke Dock, Narberth and Haverfordwest CC on 1 July 1919. Renamed Haverfordwest, Pembroke Dock and Narberth CC on 1 January 1936. Renamed Haverfordwest CC on 1 January 1957. Shares a building with Haverfordwest Magistrates' Court.
Hereford	15 March 1847	Midlands	The Ministry of Justice announced a proposal in July 2015 to move the court to the same building as the local magistrates' court.
Hertford	15 March 1847	South East	
High Wycombe	15 March 1847	South East	Shares a building with High Wycombe Magistrates' Court.
Horsham	15 March 1847	South East	Shares a building with Horsham Magistrates' Court.
Huddersfield	15 March 1847	North East	
Ipswich	15 March 1847	South East	
Isle of Wight (located in Newport)	15 March 1847	South West	Renamed Newport and Ryde CC on 1 April 1863. Renamed Newport (Isle of Wight) CC on 1 October 1968. Shares a building with Isle of Wight Magistrates' Court and Newport (Isle of Wight) Crown Court.
Kendal	15 March 1847	North West	Shares a building with Kendal Magistrates' Court. The closure of the court was proposed by the Ministry of Justice in July 2015.
Kettering	15 March 1847	Midlands	The closure of the court was proposed by the Ministry of Justice in July 2015.
King's Lynn	15 March 1847	South East	Also sat in Fakenham and in Swaffham for a time after these courts were consolidated with King's Lynn CC on 1 April 1969, the name remaining King's Lynn CC throughout. The closure of the court was proposed by the Ministry of Justice in July 2015.
Kingston-upon-Hull	15 March 1847	North East	Renamed Kingston-upon-Hull and Patrington CC on 30 June 1920. Renamed Kingston-upon-Hull CC on 1 July 1925. Shares a building with Kingston upon Hull Crown Court.
Kingston-upon-Thames	15 March 1847	London	
Lambeth	15 March 1847	London	The closure of the court was proposed by the Ministry of Justice in July 2015.
Lancaster	15 March 1847	North West	The Ministry of Justice announced a proposal in July 2015 to move the court to the same building as the local magistrates' court.
Leeds	15 March 1847	North East	Shares a building with Leeds Crown Court.
Leicester	15 March 1847	Midlands	Shares a building with Leicester Crown Court.
Lewes	15 March 1847	South East	Renamed Eastbourne and Lewes CC on 28 February 1878. Eastbourne CC was made a separate court on 1 October 1919 and Lewes became part of Brighton and Lewes CC. Lewes CC became a separate court again on 1 July 1951. Shares a building with Lewes Crown Court.
Lincoln	15 March 1847	Midlands	Consolidated on 1 November 1917 as part of Horncastle and Lincoln CC. Renamed Lincoln and Horncastle CC on 1 January 1920. Renamed Lincoln CC on 1 October 1968.
Liverpool	15 March 1847	North West	The building is called Liverpool Civil and Family Court and opened on 2 May 2006.
Llanelli	15 March 1847	Wales	
Llangefni	15 March 1847	Wales	Renamed Holyhead and Llangefni CC on 31 December 1858. Renamed Holyhead, Llangefni and Menai Bridge CC on 30 September 1883. Renamed Llangefni, Holyhead and Menai Bridge CC on 1 January 1936. Renamed Llangefni and Holyhead CC on 1 April 1969. Renamed Llangefni CC on 1 July 1976. The closure of the court was proposed by the Ministry of Justice in July 2015.
Lowestoft	15 March 1847	South East	Shares a building with Lowestoft Magistrates' Court. The closure of the court was proposed by the Ministry of Justice in July 2015.
Luton	15 March 1847	South East	
Macclesfield	15 March 1847	North West	The closure of the court was proposed by the Ministry of Justice in July 2015.
Maidstone	15 March 1847	South East	Shares a building with Maidstone Magistrates' Court.
Manchester	15 March 1847	North West	Now located in the Manchester Civil Justice Centre, which opened on 24 October 2007
Mansfield	15 March 1847	Midlands	Shares a building with the magistrates' court at Mansfield Courthouse
Mayor's and City of London Court	1 January 1972	London	Successor to courts pre-dating the 1846 Act. The City of London courts were left untouched by the 1846 Act (although later legislation applied the rules prevailing in the county courts to them). The old Mayor's and City of London Court was abolished by section 42 of the Courts Act 1971, the City of London was made a county court district and the new county court for the City of London was given the name of its predecessor. It remains the only county court not to contain "county" in its title.
Medway (located in Chatham)	3 May 1976	South East	Created by the relocation and renaming of Rochester CC.
Merthyr Tydfil	15 March 1847	Wales	Shares a building with Merthyr Tydfil Crown Court and Merthyr Tydfil Magistrates' Court.
Middlesbrough	15 March 1847	North East	Shares a building with Teesside Crown Court.
Milton Keynes	28 May 1986	South East	Created by the relocation and renaming of Bletchley and Leighton Buzzard CC.
Mold	15 March 1847	Wales	Shares a building with Mold Crown Court.
Morpeth and Berwick (located in Morpeth)	15 March 1847	North East	Morpeth CC was renamed Morpeth and Blyth CC on 1 July 1898. Renamed Morpeth CC when Blyth became a separate court on 1 July 1958. Renamed Morpeth and Berwick CC on 15 December 1997 when Berwick CC was closed. Whilst based in Morpeth, the court also regularly sits in Berwick and Alnwick. The closure of the court was proposed by the Ministry of Justice in July 2015.
Neath and Port Talbot (located in Neath)	15 March 1847	Wales	Neath CC was renamed Neath and Aberavon CC on 1 July 1899. Renamed Neath and Port Talbot CC on 1 July 1922. The closure of the court was proposed by the Ministry of Justice in July 2015.
Newcastle upon Tyne	15 March 1847	North East	Shares a building with Newcastle Crown Court.
Newport (Gwent)	15 March 1847	Wales	Renamed from Newport (Mon.) CC on 27 March 1975
North Shields	15 March 1847	North East	
Northampton	15 March 1847	Midlands	Renamed Northampton and Towcester CC on 1 January 1918. Renamed Northampton CC on 1 January 1929. Shares a building with Northampton Crown Court.
Norwich	15 March 1847	South East	Also sat in Cromer and in Diss for a time after these courts were consolidated with Norwich CC on 1 October 1968 and 1 April 1969 respectively, the name remaining Norwich CC throughout. Shares a building with Norwich Crown Court.
Nottingham	15 March 1847	Midlands	Also sat in Bingham for a time after Bingham CC was consolidated with Nottingham CC on 31 July 1910, the name remaining Nottingham CC. Shares a building with Nottingham Crown Court.
Nuneaton	15 March 1847	Midlands	Part of the Warwickshire Justice Centre
Oldham	15 March 1847	North West	The closure of the court was proposed by the Ministry of Justice in July 2015.
Oxford	15 March 1847	South East	Consolidated with Bicester CC as Oxford and Bicester CC on 7 August 1905. Consolidated with Woodstock CC as Oxford, Bicester and Woodstock CC on 1 January 1916. Renamed Oxford CC on 1 May 1918. Shares a building with Oxford Crown Court.
Peterborough	15 March 1847	South East	Consolidated with Oundle CC on 1 January 1965 as Peterborough and Oundle CC. Renamed Peterborough CC on 1 October 1968. Shares a building with Peterborough Crown Court.
Plymouth	15 March 1847; 30 September 1893	South West	Replaced by East Stonehouse CC on 30 September 1850. Plymouth CC was reopened as part of Plymouth and East Stonehouse CC in 1893. Renamed Plymouth CC on 24 June 1911. Also sat in Tavistock for a time after Tavistock CC closed on 1 July 1970, the name remaining Plymouth CC. Shares a building with Plymouth Crown Court.
Pontypridd	1 November 1856	Wales	Replaced Newbridge CC. Renamed Pontypridd and Ystradyfodwg CC on 30 November 1886. Renamed Pontypridd, Ystradyfodwg and Porth CC on 1 January 1896. Renamed Pontypridd and Ystradyfodwg CC on 1 January 1960. Renamed Pontypridd CC on 1 January 1973.
Portsmouth	15 March 1847	South West	Also sat in Petersfield for a time after Petersfield CC closed on 1 April 1982, the name remaining Portsmouth CC. Shares a building with Portsmouth Crown Court.
Preston	15 March 1847	North West	Renamed Preston and Chorley CC on 1 February 1918. Renamed Preston CC on 1 January 1925. Shares a building with Preston Crown Court.
Reading	15 March 1847	South East	Renamed Reading and Henley-on-Thames CC on 31 December 1848. Renamed Reading CC when Henley-on-Thames CC was made a separate court on 25 October 1856.
Reigate (located in Redhill)	15 March 1847; 5 October 1953	South East	Reigate CC was replaced by Redhill CC on 30 June 1885. Redhill CC was renamed Reigate CC on 5 October 1953 and the court moved to Reigate, although later moved back to Redhill whilst retaining the name "Reigate". Shares a building with Redhill Magistrates' Court. The closure of the court was proposed by the Ministry of Justice in July 2015.
Rhyl	2 February 1867	Wales	Opened as part of St Asaph and Rhyl CC. Renamed Rhyl CC on 1 January 1911. The closure of the court was announced in December 2010.
Romford	15 March 1847; 6 October 1980	London	Renamed Romford and Ilford CC on 1 August 1903. Closed on 15 June 1934. Reopened in 1980.
Rotherham	15 March 1847	North East	Shares a building with Rotherham Magistrates' Court. The closure of the court was proposed by the Ministry of Justice in July 2015.
Salisbury	15 March 1847	South West	Shares a building with Salisbury Crown Court.
Scarborough	15 March 1847	North East	Shares a building with Scarborough Magistrates' Court since closure at separate Pavilion House premises in September 2012. Sometimes also sits at Bridlington Magistrates' Court.
Scunthorpe	1 May 1900	North East	Opened as part of Brigg and Scunthorpe CC. Renamed Scunthorpe and Brigg CC on 1 January 1936. Renamed Scunthorpe CC on 1 April 1967. Shares a building with Scunthorpe Magistrates' Court. The closure of the court was proposed by the Ministry of Justice in July 2015.
Sheffield	15 March 1847	North East	Shares a building with Sheffield Crown Court.
Skipton	15 March 1847	North East	Shares a building with Skipton Magistrates' Court.
Slough	1 January 1958	South East	Created by the relocation and renaming of Windsor CC.
South Shields	15 March 1847	North East	Shares a building with South Tyneside Magistrates' Court.
Southampton	15 March 1847	South West	Also sat in Lymington for a time after Lymington CC closed on 1 April 1982, the name remaining Southampton CC. Shares a building with Southampton Crown Court.
Southend	28 February 1878	South East	Opened as part of Rochford and Southend CC. Renamed Southend CC on 31 March 1888. The Ministry of Justice announced a proposal in July 2015 to move the court to the same building as the local crown and magistrates' courts.
St Albans	15 March 1847	South East	Consolidated with Barnet CC as Barnet and St Albans CC on 1 October 1917. Both were reconstituted as separate courts on 1 April 1922. Shares a building with St Albans Crown Court. The closure of the court was proposed by the Ministry of Justice in July 2015.
St Helens	15 March 1847	North West	Renamed St Helens and Widnes CC on 30 September 1886. Renamed St Helens CC on 18 January 1971. The closure of the court was proposed by the Ministry of Justice in July 2015.
Stafford	15 March 1847	Midlands	Shares a building with Stafford Crown Court.
Staines	3 May 1976	South East	Opened to serve an area formerly included within the districts of Brentford, Kingston-upon-Thames, Slough and Uxbridge County Courts. Shares a building with Staines Magistrates' Court.
Stockport	15 March 1847	North West	The closure of the court was proposed by the Ministry of Justice in July 2015.
Stoke-on-Trent	31 January 1854	Midlands	Opened to serve an area formerly included within the district of Hanley CC. Renamed Stoke-on-Trent and Longton CC on 1 April 1863. Consolidated with Hanley CC on 11 February 1920 as Hanley and Stoke-on-Trent CC (sittings at Longton ceasing at the same time). Consolidated with Burslem CC as Hanley and Stoke-on-Trent (sitting also at Burslem) on 1 January 1933. Renamed Stoke-on-Trent CC on 1 January 1968 (though sittings at Hanley continued for a time). Shares a building with Stoke-on-Trent Crown Court.
Sunderland	15 March 1847	North East	
Swansea	15 March 1847	Wales	Building known as Swansea Civil Justice Centre since High Court civil cases are also heard here.
Swindon	15 March 1847	South West	Also sat in Cirencester for a time after Cirencester CC closed on 1 July 1970, the name remaining Swindon CC. Shares a building with Swindon Crown Court.
Tameside (located in Ashton-under-Lyne)	15 March 1847; 31 January 1987	North West	Ashton-under-Lyne CC was renamed Ashton-under-Lyne and Stalybridge CC on 30 September 1881. Renamed Ashton-under-Lyne CC on 1 January 1958. Renamed Ashton-under-Lyne and Stalybridge CC, and transferred to Stalybridge, on 18 September 1964. Renamed Tameside CC, and transferred back to Ashton-under-Lyne, on 31 January 1987. Shares a building with Tameside Magistrates' Court. The closure of the court was proposed by the Ministry of Justice in July 2015.
Taunton	15 March 1847	South West	Shares a building with Taunton Crown Court.
Telford	9 January 1989	Midlands	Created by the relocation and renaming of Wellington CC. Since the closure of Shrewsbury County Court in 2011, the Telford court also sits at Shrewsbury's magistrates' court premises from time to time. The Ministry of Justice announced a proposal in July 2015 to move the court to the same building as the local magistrates' court.
Thanet (located in Margate)	15 March 1847	South East	Renamed Thanet CC when it was consolidated with Ramsgate CC on 25 March 1976. Shares a building with Margate Magistrates' Court.
Torquay and Newton Abbot (located near Torquay)	1 April 1863	South West	Opened as part of Torquay and Newton Abbot CC. Torquay CC and Newton Abbot CC became separate courts on 1 May 1928. Torquay CC was renamed Torquay and Newton Abbot County Court on 4 November 1996 following the closure of Newton Abbot CC earlier that year.
Truro	15 March 1847	South West	Consolidated with Falmouth as Falmouth and Truro CC on 1 November 1917. Renamed Truro and Falmouth CC on 1 January 1936. Also sat in Newquay for a time after Newquay CC closed on 1 July 1970, the name remaining Truro and Falmouth CC. Renamed Truro CC on 1 April 1977. Shares a building with Truro Crown Court.
Tunbridge Wells	15 March 1847	South East	The closure of the court was proposed by the Ministry of Justice in July 2015.
Uxbridge	15 March 1847	London	
Wakefield	15 March 1847	North East	Originally located in the former Inland Revenue 'Crown House' building. Following its demolition in of 2012, the court sat at Pontefract County Court until its new premises opened at Wakefield Civil Justice Centre on Westgate, Wakefield, in January 2013.
Walsall	15 March 1847	Midlands	
Wandsworth	15 March 1847	London	
Warrington	15 March 1847	North West	The closure of the court was proposed by the Ministry of Justice in July 2015.
Warwick (located in Leamington Spa)	15 March 1847	Midlands	Shares a building with Warwick Crown Court
Watford	15 March 1847	South East	
Welshpool	15 March 1847	Wales	Welshpool CC was renamed Welshpool and Newtown CC on 1 April 1984 on the closure of Newtown CC. Shares a building with Welshpool Magistrates' Court.
West Cumbria (located in Workington)	4 July 2011	North West	Replaced Whitehaven County Court, which had been established in 1847 The closure of the court was proposed by the Ministry of Justice in July 2015.
Weston-super-Mare	15 March 1847	South West	Renamed Weston-super-Mare and Axbridge CC on 31 December 1848. Renamed Weston-super-Mare CC on 25 October 1856 when Axbridge CC was made a separate court. Shares a building with North Somerset Magistrates' Court.
Weymouth	15 March 1847	South West	
Wigan	15 March 1847	North West	Shares a building with Wigan and Leigh Magistrates' Court
Willesden	1 January 1931	London	A county court in Willesden had been provided for in the 1899 rearrangement of court districts (along with courts in Richmond and West Ham). However, these parts of the Order were never brought into force. A new order was made to open the court in 1931.
Winchester	15 March 1847	South West	Shares a building with Winchester Crown Court.
Wolverhampton	15 March 1847	Midlands	Shares a building with Wolverhampton Crown Court.
Woolwich	31 December 1848	London	Opened as part of Greenwich and Woolwich CC. Renamed Woolwich CC on 1 January 1937 when Greenwich CC was made a separate court. The closure of the court was proposed by the Ministry of Justice in July 2015.
Worcester	15 March 1847	Midlands	Shares a building with Worcester Crown Court.
Worksop	15 March 1847	Midlands	Worksop County Court closed in April 2011 but hearings are still heard at Worksop Magistrates' and County Court, administered from Mansfield.
Worthing	15 March 1847	South East	Shares a building with Worthing Magistrates' Court.
Wrexham	15 March 1847	Wales	Renamed Wrexham and Llangollen CC on 30 September 1867. Renamed Wrexham CC on 1 January 1920.
Yeovil	15 March 1847	South West	The Ministry of Justice announced a proposal in July 2015 to move the court to the same building as the local magistrates' court.
York	15 March 1847	North East	

== See also ==
- Courts of England and Wales
- List of courts in England and Wales
- List of former county courts in Wales
