= Southampton Courts of Justice =

Judicial building in Southampton, England

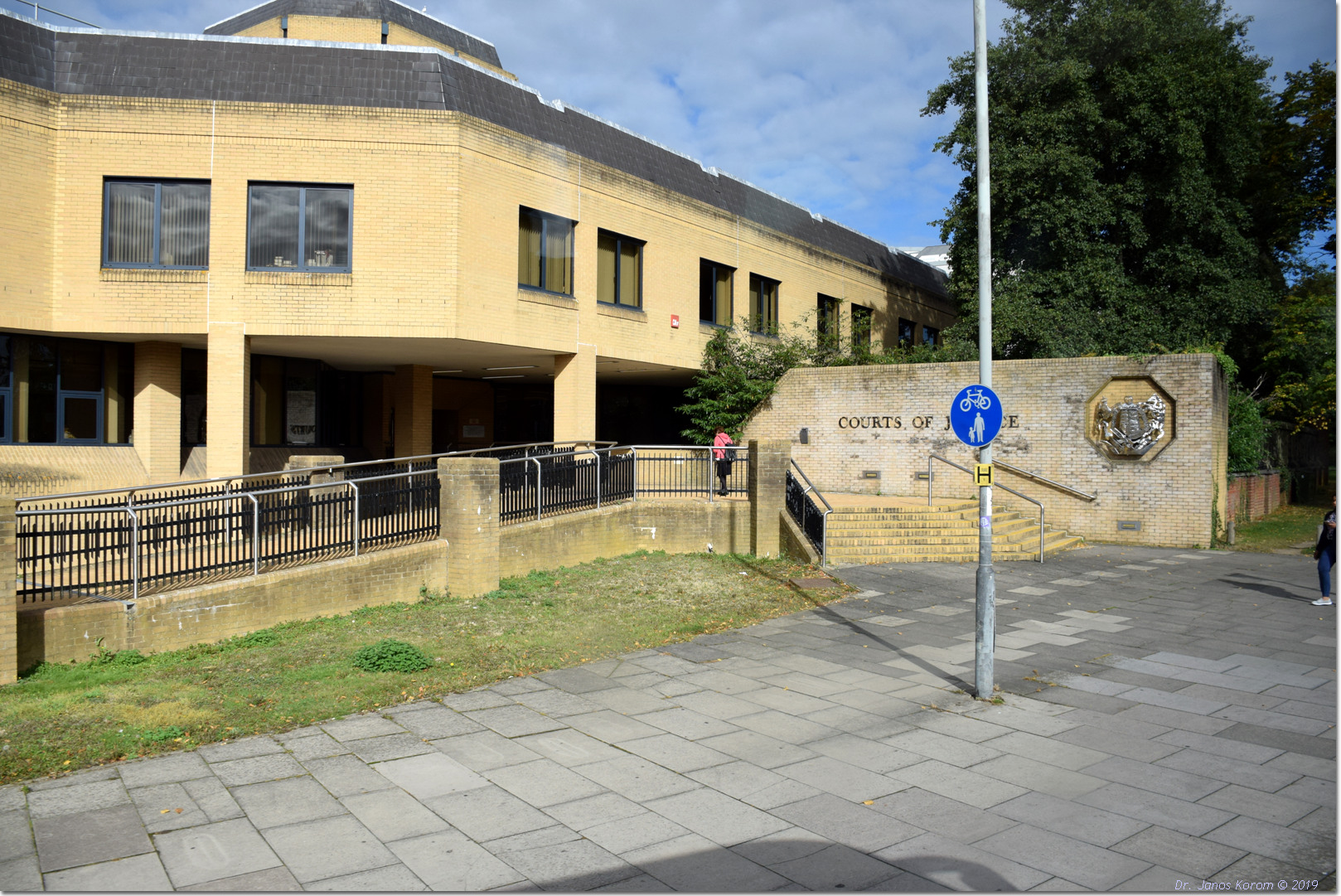
- Southampton Courts of Justice

- Shown in Hampshire
- 50.9138°N 1.4030°W
- Location: London Road, Southampton

History
- Built: 1986

Site notes
- Architect: Broadway Malyan
- Architectural style: Modernist style

The Southampton Courts of Justice, also known as Southampton Combined Court Centre, is a Crown Court venue, which deals with criminal cases, as well as a County Court venue, which deals with civil cases, in London Road, Southampton, England.

== History ==
Until the early 1930s, criminal court hearings in Southampton, known as the assizes, were heard in the Bargate in the High Street. Such cases were then transferred to the west wing of Southampton Civic Centre when it opened in November 1933. However, as the number of court cases in Southampton grew, it became necessary to commission a more modern courthouse for criminal matters: the site selected by the Lord Chancellor's Department on London Road had been occupied by the headquarters of the Ordnance Survey which had been heavily bombed as part of the Southampton Blitz on 30 November and 1 December 1940 during Second World War.

Construction of the new building started in May 1984. It was designed by Broadway Malyan in the Modernist style, built in yellow brick at a cost of £7 million, and was completed in December 1986. It was officially opened by the Lord Chief Justice, Lord Lane, in February 1987. The design involved an asymmetrical main frontage of eight bays facing London Road. On the first floor, the left hand section of two bays, was connected by a canted section, to the right hand section of five bays, which was projected forward and cantilevered out over the pavement. The main frontage was fenestrated on the first floor by pairs of casement windows split by brick columns supporting the first floor structure. A short flight of steps led up to the entrance, which was in the right-hand section, and a Royal coat of arms was mounted on the wall to the right of the steps. Internally, the building was laid out to accommodate ten courtrooms.

Notable cases include the trial and acquittal, in January 1992, of the former football coach, Bob Higgins, on sex abuse charges. Nearly 30 years later, in June 2019, Higgins was sentenced to 24 years and three months in prison at Bournemouth Crown Court on charges relating to the United Kingdom football sexual abuse scandal.
