= List of former county courts in Wales =

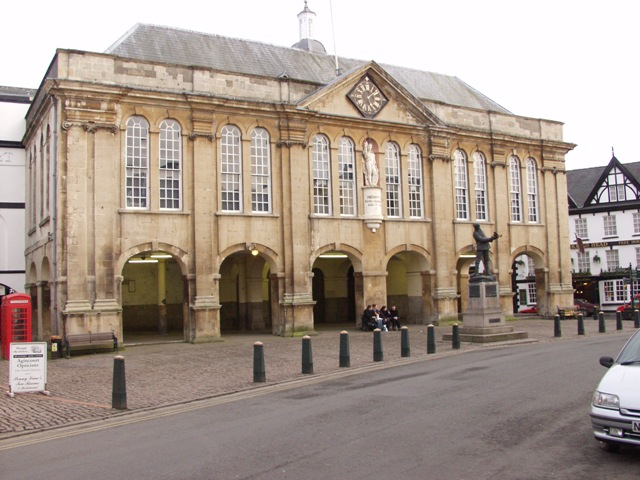
Monmouth County Court was based in the Shire Hall until it closed in 2002.

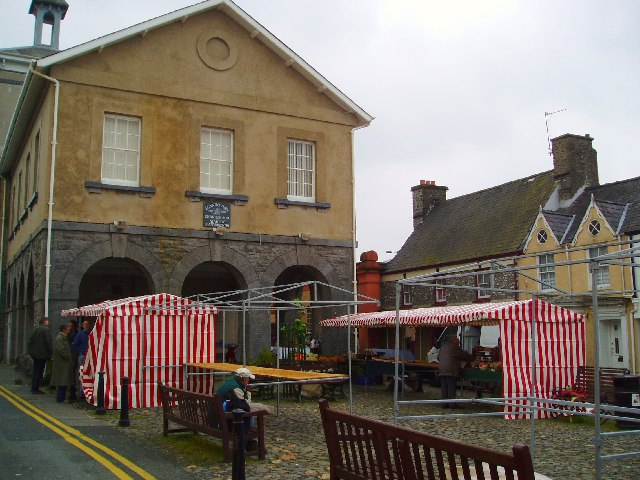
Llandovery County Court was based in the Town Hall until it closed in 1976.

Sixty county courts in Wales have closed since the modern system of county courts in England and Wales was established by the County Courts Act 1846 (9 & 10 Vict. c. 95). The act created 491 courts on 60 circuits; of these, 53 courts were in Wales and Monmouthshire, a Welsh county that had ambiguous status at the time and was sometimes treated as being in England. Since then, new courts have been opened in various locations, and 80 towns and cities in Wales have, or have had, county courts. As of 2012, there are 20 county courts in Wales. Reasons for closure have included a decision that it was "inexpedient" to continue to provide a court, the volume of business no longer justifying a court, or the state of the building housing the court. The first closure was Fishguard in 1856. The most recent closures are the county courts in Aberdare and Pontypool, which closed on 1 August 2011.

== History ==
The modern system of county courts in England and Wales dates from the County Courts Act 1846 (9 & 10 Vict. c. 95), which received royal assent on 28 August 1846 and was brought into force on 15 March 1847. England and Wales (with the exception of the City of London, which was outside the scope of the act) were divided into 60 circuits, with a total of 491 courts. Four of these circuits were wholly in Wales, as were 46 of these courts. A further seven courts were located in Monmouthshire (which had at the time an ambiguous status and was sometimes treated as being part of England) and these seven courts were part of a circuit for Monmouthshire and Herefordshire. One county court judge was appointed to each circuit, assisted by one or more registrars with some limited judicial powers, and would travel between the courts in his area as necessary, sitting in each court at least once a month. Few permanent courts were needed initially, given the infrequency of court hearings, and temporary accommodation such as a town hall would often be used where there was no existing courthouse for use.

Over time, although new courts have been opened in various locations, there has been a reduction in the number of locations where a county court is held. In all, 80 towns and cities in Wales have held county courts since 1847; 60 have closed and, as of 2012, 20 county courts in Wales are still open. The most recent opening of a county court took place in Caerphilly in 1965, although this closed in 2000. The first county court to close was Fishguard, in 1856. The latest county courts to close in Wales were Aberdare and Pontypool in 2011. Blaenavon is the only town in Wales to have a county court close and then reopen, both events taking place in 1938.

Courts have been closed for various reasons. The county courts at Fishguard, Ruabon and Cowbridge were closed because it was considered "inexpedient" to continue to hold courts there. In other cases, it was thought that it would be "of advantage to the public" to move the location of a court: the court at Pembroke was replaced by one at Pembroke Dock. The volume of court business declined during the Second World War and some little-used courts, including Presteigne and Llandeilo, were closed as a result.

There has been pressure to close courts for economic reasons since the 19th century. In 1872, more than 300 of the county courts in England and Wales cost more to run than they received in fees, but widespread closures were politically impossible. In 1899, there were proposals to close courts where fewer than 20 claims were issued per year, but these plans were frustrated by local pressure to keep courts open, since having a county court in a town was generally regarded as a mark of the town's importance. A review of the provision of county courts after the First World War concluded that Mid Wales had an "unjustifiably generous" number of county courts, but only one (Llangollen) was proposed for closure, given the need to maintain courts in rural areas.

More recently, considerations in deciding whether to close a court have included "the costs and practical implications of running a court, the public facilities, waiting times, workload levels and the overall standard of service that can be made available over the area as a whole". Monmouth, for example, was based in the Shire Hall until it was closed in 2002 because of the poor standard of the court accommodation, the lack of access for people with disabilities and the high cost to run the court compared with the use it received. The government estimated in March 2000 that the closure of 55 county courts in England and Wales (including 9 courts in Wales) in the previous 6 years had saved a minimum of £6 million, through reductions in rent and accommodation charges, running costs and judicial expense.

In June 2010, the Ministry of Justice announced plans to close 54 county courts and 103 magistrates' courts in England and Wales, in order to save £15m in annual running costs and £22m in necessary maintenance. The courts threatened with closure in Wales were Aberdare, Llangefni, Pontypool and Rhyl. In addition, it was proposed that Newport County Court would no longer hold hearings at Chepstow every fortnight (as had been done since the county court there closed in 2002). After consultation, it was decided to keep Llangefni County Court open, but the other closures were confirmed.

On 22 April 2014 the various county courts were merged into one single County Court for England and Wales.

== Closed courts ==
Until 1 January 1937, the full title of each court was "The County Court of (county) holden at (location/locations)", using the historic county names. Thereafter, each court was renamed as "(location/s) County Court". For brevity, the latter form is used throughout in this table, with "County Court" being abbreviated to "CC". All name changes in the table reflect changes in the locations where the court sat since, until 1 August 1983, a county court with more than one location in its title would sit at each location named.

| Name of County Court | Date of opening | Date of closing | Notes |
|---|---|---|---|
| Aberaeron | 15 March 1847 | 1 January 1946 | |
| Aberavon | 1 July 1899 | 1 July 1922 | It was opened as part of Neath and Aberavon CC, and closed when the court became Neath and Port Talbot CC. |
| Aberdare | 31 May 1856 | 1 August 2011 | It was opened to serve an area formerly within the district of Merthyr Tydfil CC. It was renamed Aberdare and Mountain Ash CC on 3 August 1897. The court was renamed Aberdare CC on 1 October 1953, when Mountain Ash CC closed. |
| Abergavenny | 15 March 1847 | 1 July 1976 | It was renamed Abergavenny and Blaenavon CC on 1 July 1899, and renamed Abergavenny CC on 1 January 1938. It was consolidated with Pontypool CC as part of Pontypool and Abergavenny CC on 1 October 1968. |
| Abertillery | 1 September 1919 | 1 July 1976 | It was opened as part of Tredegar and Abertillery CC, which became Tredegar, Abertillery and Bargoed CC on 1 January 1926. It was renamed Tredegar, Blackwood, Abertillery and Bargoed CC on 24 January 1949, before being renamed Blackwood, Tredegar and Abertillery CC on 1 April 1953 when Bargoed CC was made a separate court. |
| Ammanford | 1 November 1918 | 27 March 1997 | It was opened as part of Carmarthen, Llandeilo and Ammanford CC, which was renamed Carmarthen and Ammanford CC on 1 March 1944. It became a separate court on 1 April 1953. |
| Bala | 15 March 1847 | 1 April 1969 | It was consolidated with Corwen CC on 1 August 1916 as Bala and Corwen CC. |
| Bangor | 15 March 1847 | 4 July 1994 | |
| Bargoed | 1 January 1926 | 29 December 1995 | It was consolidated on 24 January 1949 as part of Tredegar, Blackwood, Abertillery and Bargoed CC. Bargoed CC was reconstituted as a separate court on 1 April 1953. |
| Barry | 15 March 1847 | 29 December 1995 | It was consolidated with Cardiff CC on 26 September 1932 as Cardiff and Barry CC. Barry CC was reconstituted as a separate court on 1 October 1959. |
| Blaenau Ffestiniog | 31 March 1883 | 1 April 1969 | It was opened as part of Porthmadog and Blaenau Ffestiniog CC. |
| Blaenavon | 1 July 1899; 1 June 1938 | 1 January 1938; 1 June 1954 | It was opened as part of Abergavenny and Blaenavon CC. It closed for five months in 1938 before reopening as part of Pontypool and Blaenavon CC. Blaenavon CC was closed for the second time in 1954. |
| Builth Wells | 15 March 1847 | 1 August 1983 | |
| Caerphilly | 1 January 1965 | 1 December 2000 | The court was opened to serve an area previously within the district of Pontypridd and Ystradyfodwg CC. |
| Cardigan | 15 March 1847 | 29 December 1995 | |
| Chepstow | 15 March 1847 | 1 April 2002 | |
| Colwyn Bay | 2 August 1910 | 1 July 1976 | It was opened as part of Conwy, Llandudno and Colwyn Bay CC. Since 1 July 1976, Conwy CC (later renamed Conwy and Colwyn CC) has sat in Colwyn Bay. |
| Corwen | 15 March 1847 | 1 April 1969 | It was consolidated with Bala CC on 1 August 1916 as Bala and Corwen CC. |
| Cowbridge | 31 December 1858 | 1 March 1876 | The court was opened as part of Bridgend and Cowbridge CC. It was closed as it was considered "inexpedient" to continue to hold a court in Cowbridge. |
| Crickhowell | 15 March 1847 | 12 August 1929 | |
| Denbigh | 15 March 1847 | 1 July 1976 | It was consolidated with Ruthin CC as Denbigh and Ruthin CC on 1 April 1907. |
| Dolgellau | 15 March 1847 | 30 June 1989 | |
| Fishguard | 31 December 1848 | 25 October 1856 | It was pened as part of Haverfordwest and Fishguard CC. Closed in 1856 as it was "inexpedient" to continue to hold a court in Fishguard. |
| Flint | 30 April 1862 | 1 April 1953 | Flint CC opened as part of Mold and Flint CC. On 1 February 1927, Mold CC was made a separate court and Flint CC became part of Holywell and Flint CC. |
| Hay-on-Wye | 15 March 1847 | 1 July 1960 | |
| Holyhead | 31 December 1858 | 1 July 1976 | It was opened as part of Holyhead and Llangefni CC, which was renamed Holyhead, Llangefni and Menai Bridge CC on 30 September 1883. It was renamed Llangefni, Holyhead and Menai Bridge CC on 1 January 1936, and then became Llangefni and Holyhead CC on 1 April 1969. |
| Holywell | 15 March 1847 | 7 September 1998 | It was consolidated on 1 February 1927 as part of Holywell and Flint CC. It was renamed Holywell CC on 1 April 1953, when Flint CC closed. |
| Knighton | 30 September 1851 | 1 July 1976 | Knighton CC opened to serve an area previously within the district of Presteigne CC. |
| Lampeter | 15 March 1847 | 5 December 1994 | |
| Llandeilo | 15 March 1847 | 1 March 1944 | It was consolidated with Carmarthen CC and renamed Carmarthen, Llandeilo and Ammanford CC on 1 November 1918. |
| Llandovery | 15 March 1847 | 1 July 1976 | |
| Llandrindod Wells | 1 July 1898 | 29 December 1995 | It was opened as part of Rhayader and Llandrindod Wells CC. The court was renamed Llandrindod Wells CC on 1 January 1920, when Rhayader CC closed. |
| Llandudno | 30 September 1878 | 1 July 1976 | It opened as part of Conwy and Llandudno CC. The court was renamed Conwy, Llandudno and Colwyn Bay CC on 2 August 1910. |
| Llanfyllin | 15 March 1847 | 1 October 1958 | It was consolidated on 1 December 1949 with Oswestry CC as Oswestry and Llanfyllin CC (a court district that straddled the border between England and Wales). |
| Llangollen | 30 September 1867 | 1 January 1920 | It opened as part of Wrexham and Llangollen CC. |
| Llanidloes | 15 March 1847 | 1 July 1970 | |
| Llanrwst | 15 March 1847 | 1 April 1969 | |
| Machynlleth | 15 March 1847 | 1 July 1976 | |
| Menai Bridge | 30 September 1883 | 1 April 1969 | It opened as part of Holyhead, Llangefni and Menai Bridge CC, which was renamed Llangefni, Holyhead and Menai Bridge CC on 1 January 1936. |
| Monmouth | 15 March 1847 | 1 April 2002 | It was closed because the accommodation in the Shire Hall, Monmouth, was of an "extremely poor standard, expensive to maintain for the low level of business conducted and [was] not accessible by people with disabilities." |
| Mountain Ash | 3 August 1897 | 1 October 1953 | It opened as part of Aberdare and Mountain Ash CC. |
| Narberth | 15 March 1847 | 1 January 1957 | It was consolidated as part of Pembroke Dock, Narberth and Haverfordwest CC on 1 July 1919. The court was renamed Haverfordwest, Pembroke Dock and Narberth CC on 1 January 1936. |
| Newbridge | 31 May 1856 | 31 October 1856 | Newbridge CC opened to serve an area previously within the district of Merthyr Tydfil CC. It was renamed a few months later as the Pontypridd CC. |
| Newcastle Emlyn | 15 March 1847 | 1 December 1947 | |
| Newtown | 15 March 1847 | 1 April 1984 | Welshpool CC was renamed Welshpool and Newtown CC when Newtown CC was closed. |
| Pembroke | 15 March 1847 | 29 June 1872 | It was replaced by Pembroke Dock CC as it was decided that this would be "of advantage to the public". |
| Pembroke Dock | 30 June 1872 | 1 January 1957 | The court replaced Pembroke CC. It was consolidated as part of Pembroke Dock, Narberth and Haverfordwest CC on 1 July 1919. Renamed Haverfordwest, Pembroke Dock and Narberth CC on 1 January 1936. |
| Pontypool | 15 March 1847 | 1 August 2011 | It was renamed Pontypool and Blaenavon CC on 1 June 1938; Blaenavon had previously been part of Abergavenny and Blaenavon CC until 1 January 1938, when sittings in Blaenavon ceased. It was renamed Pontypool CC on 1 June 1954, when Blaenavon CC closed. It was consolidated as part of Pontypool and Abergavenny CC on 1 October 1968. The court was renamed Pontypool CC on 1 July 1976, when Abergavenny CC closed. |
| Port Talbot | 1 July 1922 | 1 August 1983 | The court opened as part of Neath and Port Talbot CC (which is still open, but sitting only in Neath: the obligation for the court to sit in Port Talbot was removed in 1983). |
| Porth | 1 January 1896 | 1 January 1960 | It opened as part of Pontypridd, Ystradyfodwg and Porth CC. |
| Porthmadog | 15 March 1847 | 4 July 1994 | The court was renamed Porthmadog and Blaenau Ffestiniog CC on 31 March 1883. It was renamed Portmadog CC on 1 April 1969, when Blaenau Ffestiniog CC closed. |
| Presteigne | 15 March 1847 | 1 March 1941 | |
| Pwllheli | 15 March 1847 | 1 April 1969 | |
| Rhayader | 15 March 1847 | 1 January 1920 | It was renamed Rhayader and Llandrindod Wells CC on 1 July 1898. It closed in 1920 as use of the court was "inconsiderable". |
| Ruabon | 15 March 1847 | 19 February 1863 | Ruabon CC was closed as it was considered "inexpedient" to continue to hold a court there. |
| Ruthin | 15 March 1847 | 1 July 1976 | It was consolidated with Denbigh CC on 1 April 1907 as Denbigh and Ruthin CC. |
| St Asaph | 15 March 1847 | 31 December 1910 | The court was renamed St Asaph and Rhyl CC on 2 February 1867. |
| Tredegar | 15 March 1847 | 1 July 1976 | The court was renamed Tredegar and Abertillery CC on 1 September 1919, and became Tredegar, Abertillery and Bargoed CC on 1 January 1926. The court was renamed Tredegar, Blackwood, Abertillery and Bargoed CC on 24 January 1949, becoming Blackwood, Tredegar and Abertillery CC on 1 April 1953 when Bargoed CC was made a separate court. |
| Usk | 15 March 1847 | 1 April 1920 | |
| Ystradyfodwg | 30 November 1886 | 1 January 1973 | The court ropened as part of Pontypridd and Ystradyfodwg CC. It was renamed Pontypridd, Ystradyfodwg and Porth CC on 1 January 1896. It became Pontypridd and Ystradyfodwg CC on 1 January 1960, when Porth CC closed. |

== See also ==
- Courts of England and Wales
- List of County Court venues in England and Wales
