= Bournemouth Combined Court Centre =

Judicial building in Bournemouth, Dorset, England

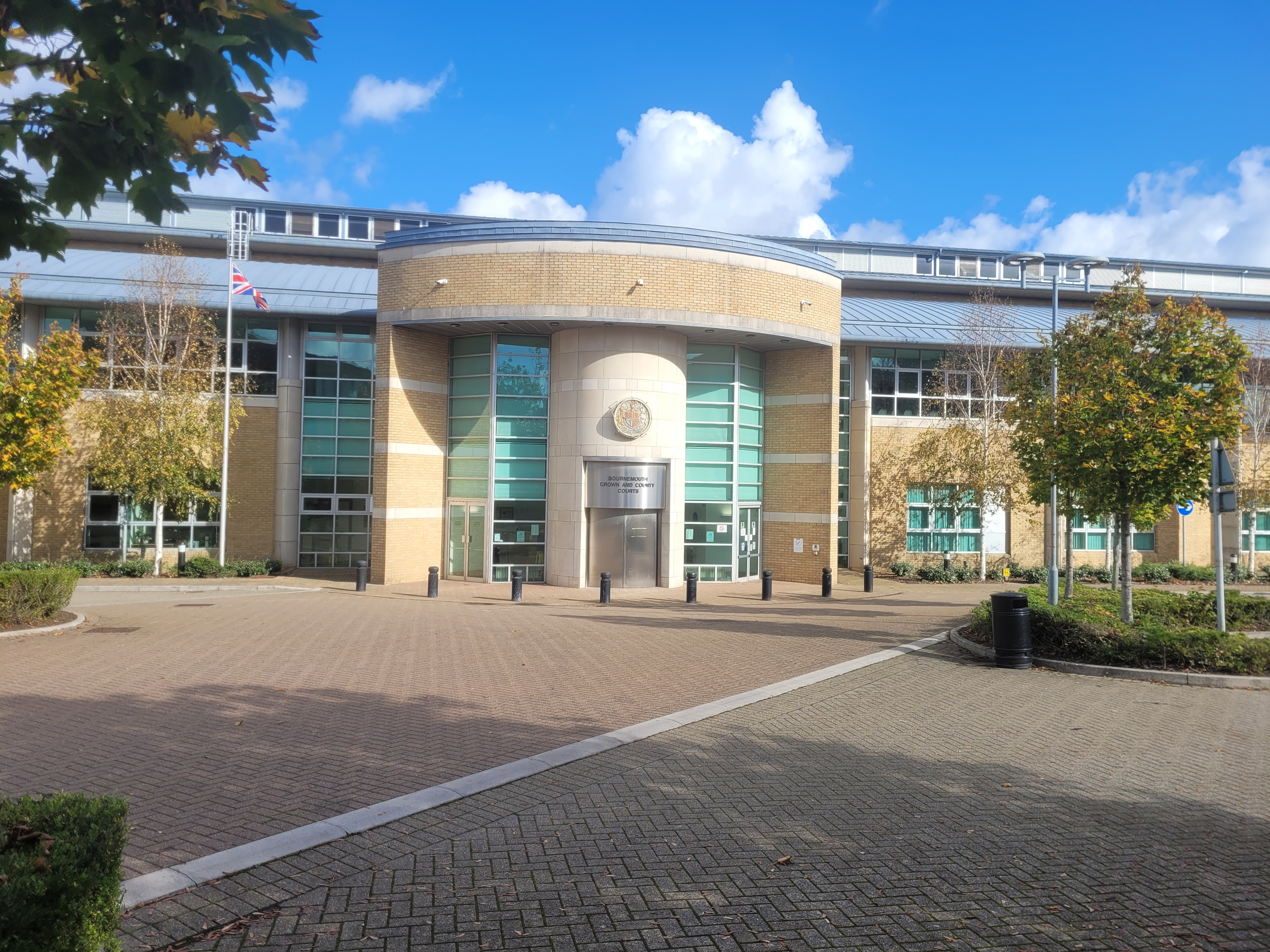
- Bournemouth Combined Court Centre

- Shown in Dorset
- 50.7480°N 1.8164°W
- Location: Deansleigh Road, Bournemouth

History
- Built: 1996

Site notes
- Architect: Napper Collerton
- Architectural style: Post-modernist style
- Governing body: His Majesty's Courts and Tribunals Service

The Bournemouth Combined Court Centre, also known as Bournemouth Courts of Justice, is a Crown Court venue, which deals with criminal cases, as well as a County Court venue, which deals with civil cases, in Deansleigh Road, Bournemouth, Dorset, England.

== History ==
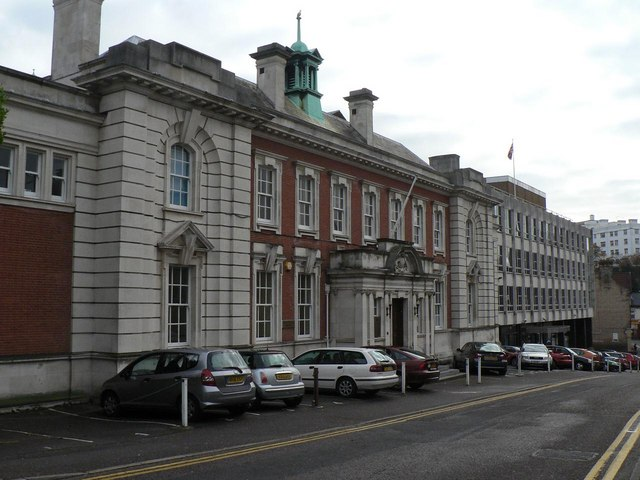
The Stafford Road Law Courts

Until the mid-1990s, all criminal court hearings in Bournemouth were held at the Law Courts in Stafford Road, which were completed in 1914. However, as the number of court cases in Bournemouth grew, it became necessary to commission a more modern courthouse for criminal matters: the site selected by the Lord Chancellor's Department was occupied by open land to the east of the Royal Bournemouth Hospital which was completed in 1989.

The new building was designed by Napper Collerton in the Post-modernist style, built by John Laing Construction in yellow brick and glass and was completed in 1996. The design involved a symmetrical main frontage of 15 bays facing south west towards Castle Lane East. The central bay featured a semi-circular portico, which was projected forward and contained a curved stone-clad entrance at its centre. There was a doorway on the ground floor and a Royal coat of arms at first floor level. The wings of seven bays each were faced in yellow brick and fenestrated by casement windows on the ground floor. There were continuous rows of glass panes on the first floor. The bays were separated by stone columns supporting a ridged roof which leant forwards. Internally, the building was laid out to accommodate nine courtrooms.

Following the closure of Dorchester Crown Court in September 2016, all cases that would have been heard in Dorchester were also referred to Bournemouth Crown Court. The old courts in Stafford Road in Bournemouth closed completely after the Coroner's Court moved to Bournemouth Town Hall, also in September 2016.

== Judges ==
On 3 May 2022, Judge William Mousley was appointed resident judge for Bournemouth Crown Court. Mousley was called to the Bar in 1986, appointed as a recorder in 2009, before taking silk in 2011. On 27 March 2020, Queen Elizabeth II appointed Mousley as a circuit judge. This was on the advice of the Lord Chancellor, Robert Buckland and the Lord Chief Justice of England and Wales, Lord Burnett of Maldon.

== Notable cases ==
In June 2019, Bob Biggins was found guilty of 46 counts of indecent assault, relating to the United Kingdom football sexual abuse scandal. He was sentenced to 24 years imprisonment and ordered to sign the sex offenders register for life.

In January 2012, Michael Edward was sentenced for the attempted murder of police officer PC Craig Bartlett, having been convicted in December 2011. Edward had stabbed Bartlett on Surrey Road, Westbourne, in February 2011, whilst police were conducting an investigation into Edward possessing drugs with the intention of supply them. Edward, using a 16 cm kitchen knife, stabbed Bartlett, causing him to suffer two stab wounds – a 12 cm wound above his hip and a 10 cm wound on his shoulder. The injuries were described as 'serious and potentially fatal'. Investigation on Bartlett's coat revealed that at least another attempt to stab him had been made. Bartlett was treated at hospital for a few days before returning to duty. Edward was jailed for 25 years.

In January 2008, Brian Phelps was on trial for rape, attempted rape and 19 indecent assaults on two girls. He was found guilty of the indecent assaults and not guilty of rape and attempted rape and was sentenced to 9 years imprisonment, as well as having to sign the sex offenders register for life. In 2023, it was revealed that new allegations against Phelps had been made.
