= Blue Angels Motorcycle Club =

International outlaw motorcycle club

Blue Angels MC
- Abbreviation: 21; BA; BAMC; Blue Gang
- Founded: 1963; 63 years ago
- Founder: Allan Morrison and Billy Gordon
- Founded at: Glasgow, Scotland
- Type: Outlaw motorcycle club
- Region served: Europe (19 chapters in Scotland, England, Belgium, Spain and Germany)
- Website: blueangelsglasgow.com

The Blue Angels Motorcycle Club (BAMC) is an international outlaw motorcycle club formed in Glasgow, Scotland in 1963. The Blue Angels MC is the oldest outlaw biker club in Europe, and one of the largest and most powerful clubs in the United Kingdom. The club has chapters in Scotland, England, Belgium, Spain and Germany.

The Blue Angels have been linked with organised crime, and have been designated a criminal motorcycle gang by the Federal Police of Belgium.

== History ==
Founded in the Maryhill area of Glasgow by Allan Morrison and Billy "Stone" Gordon in 1963, the Blue Angels Motorcycle Club is the oldest outlaw biker club in Europe. There are claims that "Blue" stands for "bastards, lunatics, undesirables and eccentrics", although this is almost certainly a backronym and the name more simply originates from the colour of the saltire. The Blue Angels emerged from Glasgow's gang culture of the era, which saw various groups fighting over control of the city's rackets. From the club's inception in the 1960s, the Blue Angels were involved in clashes with mods and Glasgow street gangs.

The Blue Angels began associating with motorcycle clubs in England during the 1970s, forming an alliance with the Road Rats of London, and rivalling the English Hells Angels; Scotland remains one of the few countries in Europe without a Hells Angels chapter. In a 2007 interview with The Scotsman, BAMC president Lenny "the Lion" Reynolds stated: "We're proud of the fact that there isn't an American influence in Scotland. We fought the Hells Angels in the 1970s which is why they don't have a chapter here." The club established chapters in the Yorkshire cities of Leeds and Sheffield in 1970. An additional chapter in London disbanded shortly after its inception. The Blue Angels expanded into Belgium in 1992 after "patching over", or amalgamating, a previously independent Belgian club of the same name which had been founded in Herzele in 1978.

In June 1987 following the death of Blue Angels Leader "Shannie" who died in a crash, bikers from all over Britain travelled to Leeds to attend the funeral.

The riders took off their helmets as a mark of respect filed behind the hearse on its journey to Cottingeley crematoriam flanked by polies outriders.

In November 2016, Kris "Bokky" De Saedeleer, who had served as the president of the Blue Angels' Belgian chapters for 22 years, was expelled for allegedly embezzling funds from the club as well as founding an unsanctioned Nomads chapter.

The club's co-founder and former president Allan Morrison died from chronic obstructive pulmonary disease on 29 January 2020, aged 77. His funeral in Glasgow on 15 February 2020 was attended by around 400 bikers from across Europe. The last of the club's original members, Lenny Reynolds, died on 21 December 2025, at the age of 80.

== Insignia ==
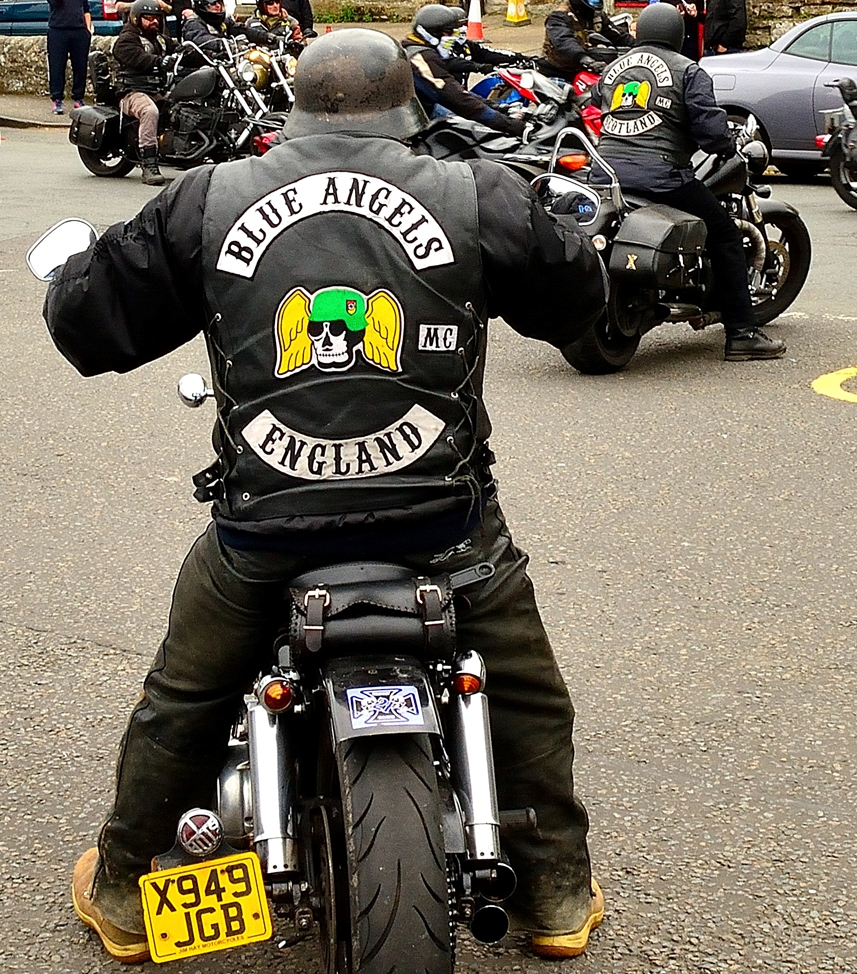
A Blue Angels member wearing the club's "colours"

The Blue Angels' "colours" originally consisted of the clubs' insignia — a winged skull wearing a Stahlhelm — and the words "Blue Angels" in Gothic script, along with "1%" patches, embroidered onto blue denim jackets. The term "one-percenter" is a reference to an alleged comment by the American Motorcycle Association that 99 per cent of motorcyclists are decent and law-abiding, while one per cent are not. The Blue Angels' insignia was legally protected in 1997. To celebrate the club's 50th anniversary in 2013, Blue Angels members began wearing a more traditional top "rocker", bearing the club's name, and bottom "rocker", denoting the country the member is from. The club is also known as the "Blue Gang", and uses the abbreviation "21" (the numbers stand for the respective positions in the alphabet of B and A). Blue Angels mottos include "Blue Angels forever, forever Blue Angels ("BAFFBA"); "Blue Angels OK"; "Blue Gang forever" ("BGF"); and "Blue Angels, best in the west".

== Membership and organisation ==
Prospective Blue Angels members must be voted in by members of the club and can be voted into the club as a full patch by other members after serving a period of time as a "prospect". The Blue Angels do not permit drug addicts as members. The club has ten chapters in Scotland, four in northern England, seven in Belgium and two in Spain and one in Germany. The Blue Angels have more than 200 members in Scotland alone. The Tribe, the BAMC's support club, was formed in Edinburgh in November 2011, and has 25 chapters, twelve of which are located in Scotland.

== Criminal allegations and incidents ==
=== Belgium ===
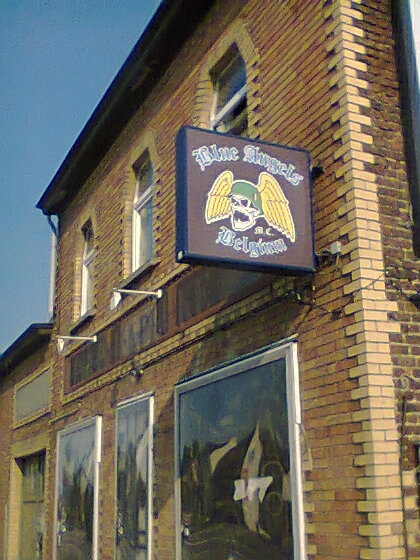
Blue Angels clubhouse in Erpe

The Gendarmerie carried out numerous operations against the Blue Angels in 1996. In March 1999, thirty-three members were sentenced to prison, received suspended sentences or were fined for possession of weapons or narcotics, assault and battery, theft, fraud, hostage-taking and criminal conspiracy, while two were acquitted.

In 2003, it is claimed by the club that 19 members of a rival gang were hospitalised in a retaliation attack after two Blue Angels bikers were shot.

In May 2009, Belgium's Federal Police named the Blue Angels as one of four criminal motorcycle gangs operating in the country, along with the Bandidos, Hells Angels and Outlaws.

Two club members were arrested for stealing insulation material from a building site in Erpe-Mere in July 2010. The men allegedly intended to use the stolen material to insulate their clubhouse.

Blue Angels members were questioned by police after a man who was ejected from the Blue Angels clubhouse in Roeselare and later returned armed with an iron bar was hospitalized with a head injury on 7 June 2014. The man was convicted of possessing an illegal weapon and was also the victim of an arson attack at his home on 30 January 2015.

A Blue Angels member was sentenced to four months in prison in November 2015 after being convicted of assaulting his son's teacher during a parents' evening at a school in Aalst. The biker claimed the teacher was bullying his son.

In July 2017, a Blue Angels member from Zonnebeke was sentenced to three years in prison for car theft, drugs and weapons possession, and forgery of a license plate and driving license.

A former Blue Angels member who refused to return his "colours" to the club after he was expelled was left in intensive care after being stabbed in Sint-Katherina-Lombeek on 8 September 2018. Six club members were arrested afterwards, and police found firearms, explosives and narcotics in the subsequent search of the men's homes. A prospective member who was allegedly involved in the stabbing committed suicide at the Blue Angels clubhouse in Sint-Amandsberg a few days later. The remaining five suspects were charged with violent theft, attempted racketeering, gang building, and possession of prohibited weapons.

=== United Kingdom ===
==== England ====
A number of Blue Angels members were prosecuted following an arson attack on the home of Leeds motorcycle garage owner Andrew Malham which took place on 30 April 2006. In July 2007, Malham was shot and wounded with a crossbow at his home in Boston Spa by Paul Miller, who was allegedly contracted by the Blue Angels to kill Malham. Miller was sentenced to sixteen months in prison in March 2008. Paul Moody, the co-owner of the motorcycle shop with Malham, was knocked unconscious in a hammer attack carried out by a group of unidentified men at a bikers' gathering near Scarborough in September 2010.

Four Blue Angels members – David Hansbury, David Torr, Steven Clayton and Martin Booth – pleaded guilty to threatening behaviour relating to an incident on 27 July 2018 in which they forced a member of the Mongrel Mob to hand over his "colours" at his home in the Beeston area of Leeds. The victim had previously been a member of the Blue Angels and served as the club's European secretary before being expelled in 2015 and warned against associating with any other motorcycle club in future. In January 2019, Torr, Clayton and Booth were sentenced to community service while Hansbury was made the subject of a two-month electronically tagged curfew order.

==== Scotland ====
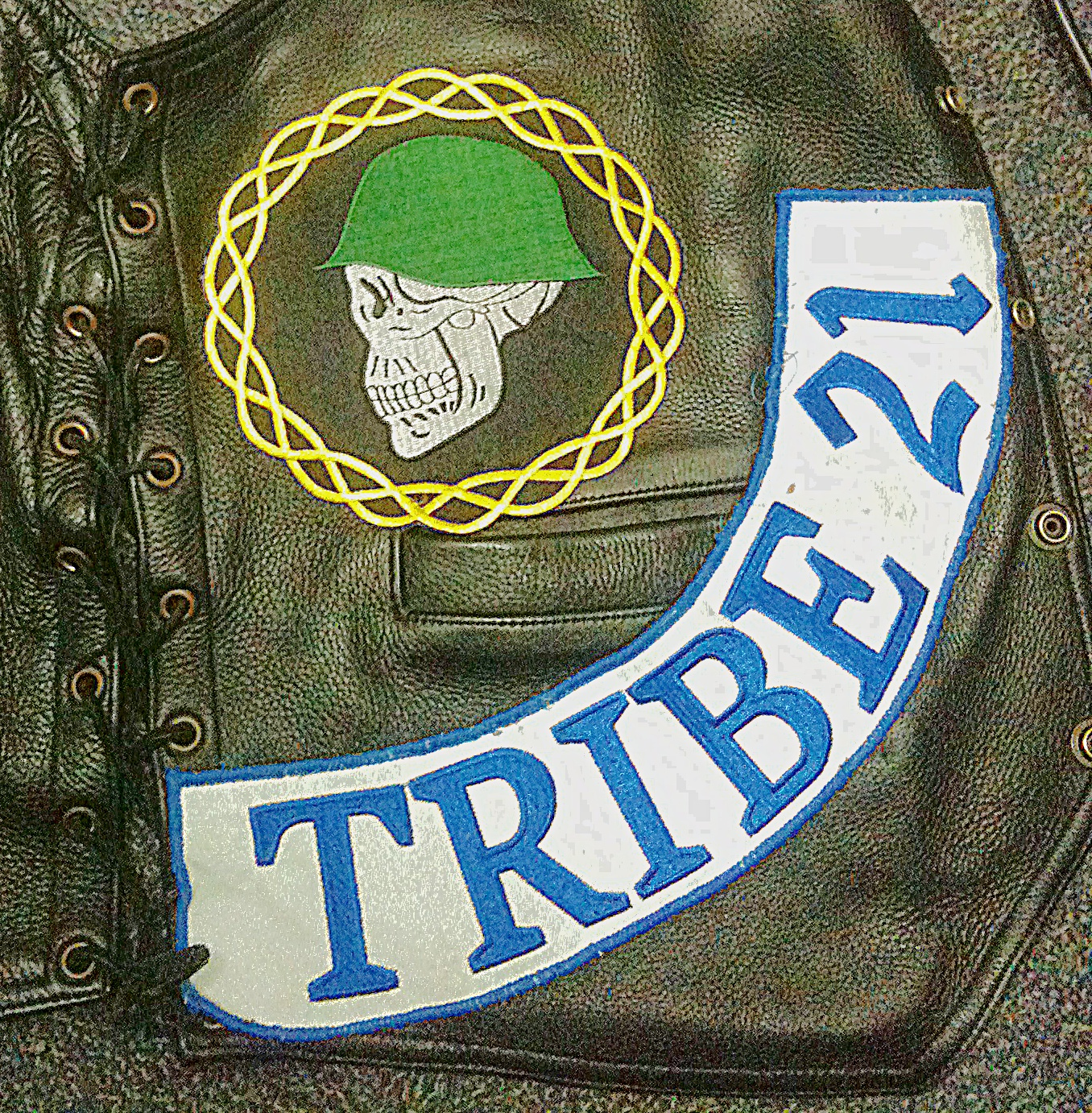
A side patch worn by the Tribe, a Blue Angels support club

In the 1960s, the most senior of Glasgow's gangs began organising protection rackets, shebeens and prostitution rings, and battled for control over such operations. The Blue Angels garnered a "notoriously violent" reputation when the club was involved in fights with mod gangs and various street gangs including the Maryhill Fleet. These conflicts typically involved bar brawls "of John Wayne proportions" which were followed by a series of revenge attacks, including petrol bombings on bars and cafes. In September 1964, a mass brawl involving hundreds of gang members in Glasgow city centre resulted in a Blue Angel being sentenced to life in prison. The gang wars ultimately ended when respective leaders met to organise a truce. Members of the Roadburners and Garthamlock Blackhawks gangs subsequently joined the Blue Angels.

The Blue Angels have alleged links to organised crime. The club became associated with Glasgow crime boss Walter Norval after Norval's daughter Rita married Blue Angels member William Gunn. Gunn was sentenced to five years in prison for threatening a witness in Norval's November 1977 armed robbery trial. Blue Angels bikers served as pallbearers at Norval's funeral in August 2014.

Blue Angels biker Leonard "Lenny the Lion" Reynolds was one of six members of the Scottish Republican Socialist League, a militant left-wing Scottish republican group, convicted of robbing a Post Office van of £100,000, and conspiring to bomb the Scottish Assembly Rooms in Edinburgh and the Glasgow Stock Exchange. The proceeds of the robbery were used by the group to buy firearms and explosives. The militants were found guilty after a five-week trial at Glasgow High Court and sentenced on 15 October 1980 to a total of 65 years imprisonment. Reynolds was sentenced to ten years and released in 1987.

Police discovered an automatic pistol and 41 rounds of live ammunition during a raid on the flat of Blue Angel Lenny Reynolds in the Dennistoun area of Glasgow on 19 March 1997. On 3 February 1998, he pleaded guilty to illegally possessing the gun and bullets. Reynolds was sentenced to nine months in prison on 24 February 1998.

The Blue Angels were reportedly involved in a biker war with the Tayside chapter of the Satans Slaves in 2011.

Actor and musician Charlie Allan was hospitalised after he was allegedly beaten outside a hotel in Stirling in June 2012 by two members of the Blue Angels who accused him of assisting the Outlaws in founding a chapter in Dundee the previous year. The Blue Angels were involved in an effort to stop the Outlaws recruiting in Scotland at the time.

A turf war involving the Blue Angels and the Nomads – a motorcycle club formed in Aberdeen in 1966 – started after the Blue Angels expanded into Aberdeenshire by "patching over" the Road Mutts and Tribe clubs. The biker war reportedly started partially for control over the organisation of lucrative motorcycle festivals. The conflict led to a string of violent attacks. On 28 September 2013, a Blue Angels member refuelling his motorcycle at a petrol station in Aberdeen was beaten with a baseball bat and a metal bar by Nomads members Gavin Blair, Alistair Thomson and Alexander Mackie who then fled the scene in a car. After being chased along the A90 road by approximately thirty to forty Blue Angels members on motorcycles, the Nomads were the victims of an attack at Foveran. Blair, Mackie and Roberts were ordered to carry out 200 hours of unpaid work in April 2014 after pleading guilty to assault.

Around twenty masked Blue Angels members armed with hammers and metal bars allegedly tried to gain entry to the clubhouse of a rival club in the Moredun area of Edinburgh, on 11 August 2018. The clubhouse was destroyed in a petrol bomb attack in the early hours of the following morning. A seriously injured man was rescued from the burning building by firemen. Blue Angels biker Adam Andrews suffered a broken leg, a broken back and a collapsed lung while carrying out the attack, was imprisoned for three years after being convicted of wilful fire-raising at Glasgow High Court on 23 March 2021.

On 8 September 2018, Blue Angels member Ian Ewing used his Vauxhall Insignia to collide with Nomads biker Colin Sutherland, causing Sutherland to fall from his motorcycle on the A98 road near Cullen, Moray. Ewing and a group of unidentified accomplices then attacked Nomads members Colin Sutherland, John Sutherland, Edward Forrest and Nicky Syratt with a claw hammer, a tyre iron and a baseball bat. The attack was allegedly carried out in retaliation for members of the Blue Angels being assaulted earlier that day. Ewing was arrested shortly afterwards in possession of a hammer and an item of clothing bearing the slogan: ""Blue Angels North East". On 3 February 2020, he was convicted at the High Court in Edinburgh of attempting to murder Colin Sutherland, assaulting John Sutherland to his severe injury and permanent disfigurement, and assaulting Forrest and Syratt to their severe injury and the danger of their lives. Co-accused Patrick Noble was acquitted on the same charges after the jury returned not proven verdicts, while charges were dropped against Kyle Urquhart and Ian Yeomans. Ewing was sentenced to seven years in prison on 15 April 2020.

A feud developed between the Blue Angels and the Mad Dogs Motorcycle Club after senior Blue Angels member Daniel Laponder broke away and formed the Mad Dogs in 2023. Subsequently, motorcycles belonging to associates of Laponder were set on fire, and Laponder was threatened with violence by a group of bikers who visited his home. On 8 June 2024, Laponder planted a pipe bomb underneath a work van belonging to David Rollo, the father of a Blue Angels member, which was parked outside his home in Lennoxtown, East Dunbartonshire. The explosive caused a major incident to be declared, which required local residents to be evacuated and a Royal Navy Explosive Ordnance Disposal unit to attend. On 3 July 2024, police traced Laponder at his residence, a barge at Kirkintilloch, where a sawn-off shotgun was discovered. A Mad Dogs-associated garage was also raided, and components similar to those used in the bombing attack were recovered. On 16 October 2024, Laponder pleaded guilty at the High Court in Glasgow to wilful fire-raising and the unlawful possession of a shotgun.
