= Scottish Stock Exchange =

Defunct organisations

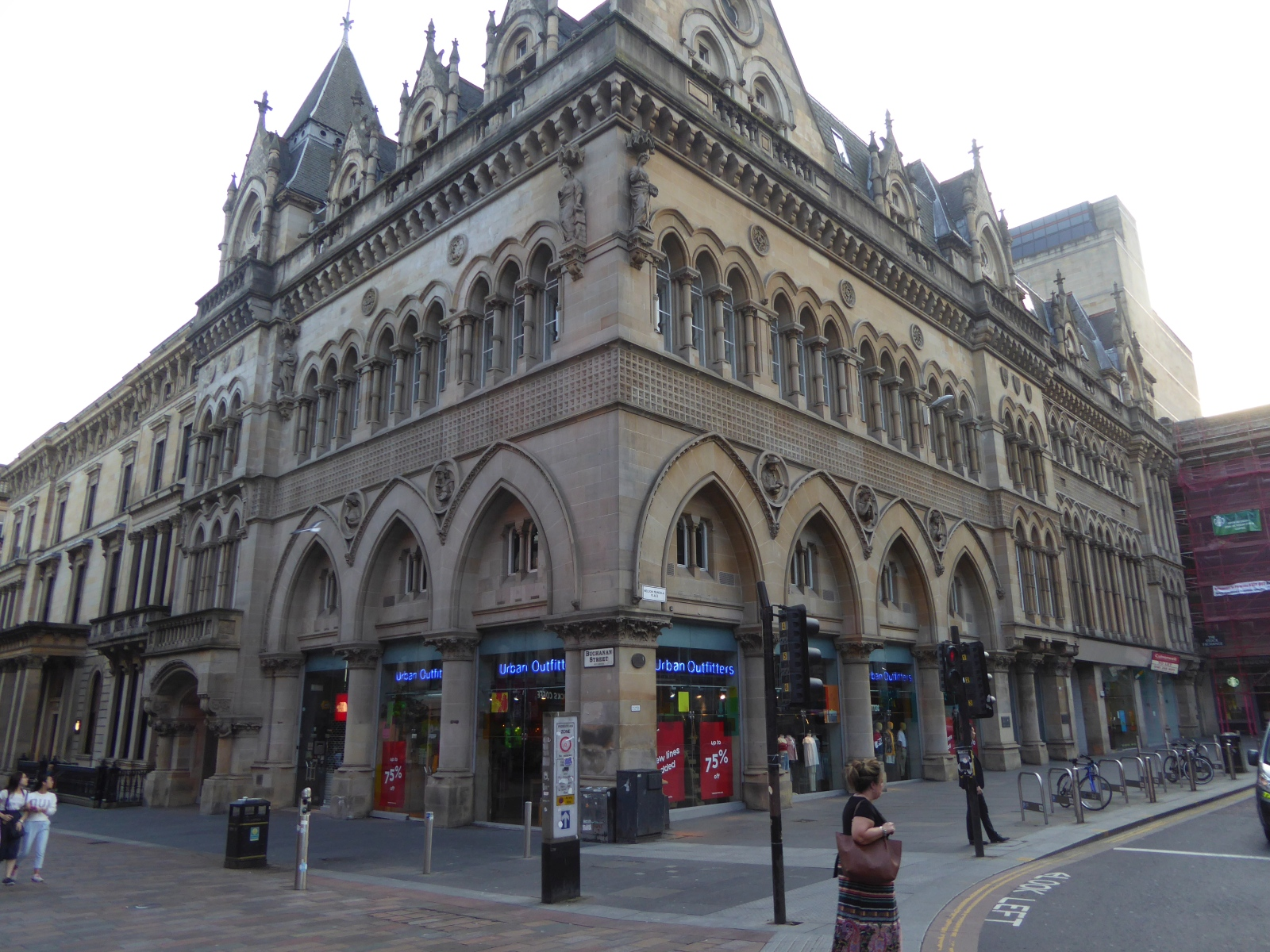
Former site in Glasgow

The Scottish Stock Exchange was a stock exchange which started trading on 2 January 1964 following a merger of the four main stock exchanges in Scotland: the Edinburgh Stock Exchange, Glasgow Stock Exchange, Dundee Stock Exchange, and Aberdeen Stock Exchange. The main secretariat of the exchange was in Glasgow, while the Edinburgh, Dundee, and Aberdeen exchanges operated as local branches until 1971, when the local exchanges closed completely.

During the construction of the new Scottish Stock Exchange building in St George's Place, Glasgow, the exchange was housed in a converted warehouse on Ingram Street. The new building was opened after two years' work on 13 April 1971.

In 1973, the Scottish Stock Exchange merged into the London Stock Exchange.

Since then, there have been calls to re-establish an independent stock exchange in Scotland.

In 2016, plans were announced for the establishment of a Scottish Stock Exchange by a group of ex-NASDAQ traders and Scottish investors to be based in Edinburgh. The announcement was made after the referendum on the UK's membership of the EU.

In 2018, fresh plans for a Scottish Stock Exchange were unveiled when businessman Tomás Carruthers announced a deal with Euronext to provide its Optiq software platform for a virtual exchange based in Scotland, tentatively known as Bourse Scot. Background research published in November 2018 was positively reviewed in Forbes magazine. Further details were disclosed at an event in March 2019 with news of funding arranged with the accountancy and business advisory firm, AAB once FCA approval is gained. On 9 May 2019 it was announced that Scottish Enterprise had awarded a £750,000 Regional Selective Assistance grant to Project Heather in support of 45 highly skilled jobs However, the scheme collapsed later in the year leaving employees unpaid.

== See also ==
- List of stock exchanges in the United Kingdom, the British Crown Dependencies and United Kingdom Overseas Territories
