= Edinburgh Stock Exchange =

Stock exchange in Edinburgh, Scotland

The Edinburgh Stock Exchange was established in 1844. Not to be confused with the Edinburgh Royal Exchange.

== Formation ==
Shares were first dealt in the city around 1825. The Edinburgh Stock Exchange was established in 1844, when seven brokers met on 16 December 1844 to establish an exchange, recognising the increasing size of the industry.

The rival Edinburgh and Leith Commercial and Stock Exchange was founded the following year by traders who did not wish to or could not comply with the rules of the Edinburgh Stock Exchange, such as a requirement to be a resident of Edinburgh, and to be nominated by two members to be admitted to the exchange. The two bodies merged in 1856.

The founding of the stock exchange coincided with the development of the financial industry within the city, such as the establishment of the Society of Accountants in 1853 and the Actuarial Society of Edinburgh in 1859.

== Premises ==
The Edinburgh Stock Exchange was originally located in a "front room flat" at No. 71 Princes Street, but quickly moved to South St. David Street. After a turn in the fortunes of the business, smaller premises were sought, but after a recovery new premises were being sought by 1870, and the exchange moved to Craigie Hall in 1874, before returning to South St. David Street in 1880. In 1888 a new building was constructed on the site, which stood until it was replaced by a modern one in 1966.

== Merging ==
In 1964, the Edinburgh, Glasgow, Aberdeen and Dundee stock exchanges came together to form the Scottish Stock Exchange, while still continuing to trade locally in each city, but with Glasgow as the main branch. The Scottish Stock Exchange was closed in 1973, resulting in the closure of the Edinburgh Stock Exchange offices.

More than three-quarters of Scottish bank shares were traded at the Edinburgh exchange, although the Bank of Scotland, the Caledonian Bank and the City of Glasgow Bank were also listed at other Scottish exchanges.

Share prices from the Edinburgh Stock Exchange were published in the Edinburgh Evening Courant until 1886, then the Edinburgh Evening News.

== New Edinburgh Stock Exchange ==
A new Edinburgh Stock Exchange, called SCOTEX, has been proposed for 2017/18 by a team of former traders from the US stock exchange Nasdaq, pending the outcome of an application to the Financial Conduct Authority. The proposed Stock Exchange would be a “Scots-50” index to rank Scotland's leading listed companies. This has been proposed in light of the UK's Brexit vote, and the expectation of a further Scottish Independence Referendum, by 2019, which did not transpire.
