= Chelsea Bridge =

Bridge over the River Thames in west London

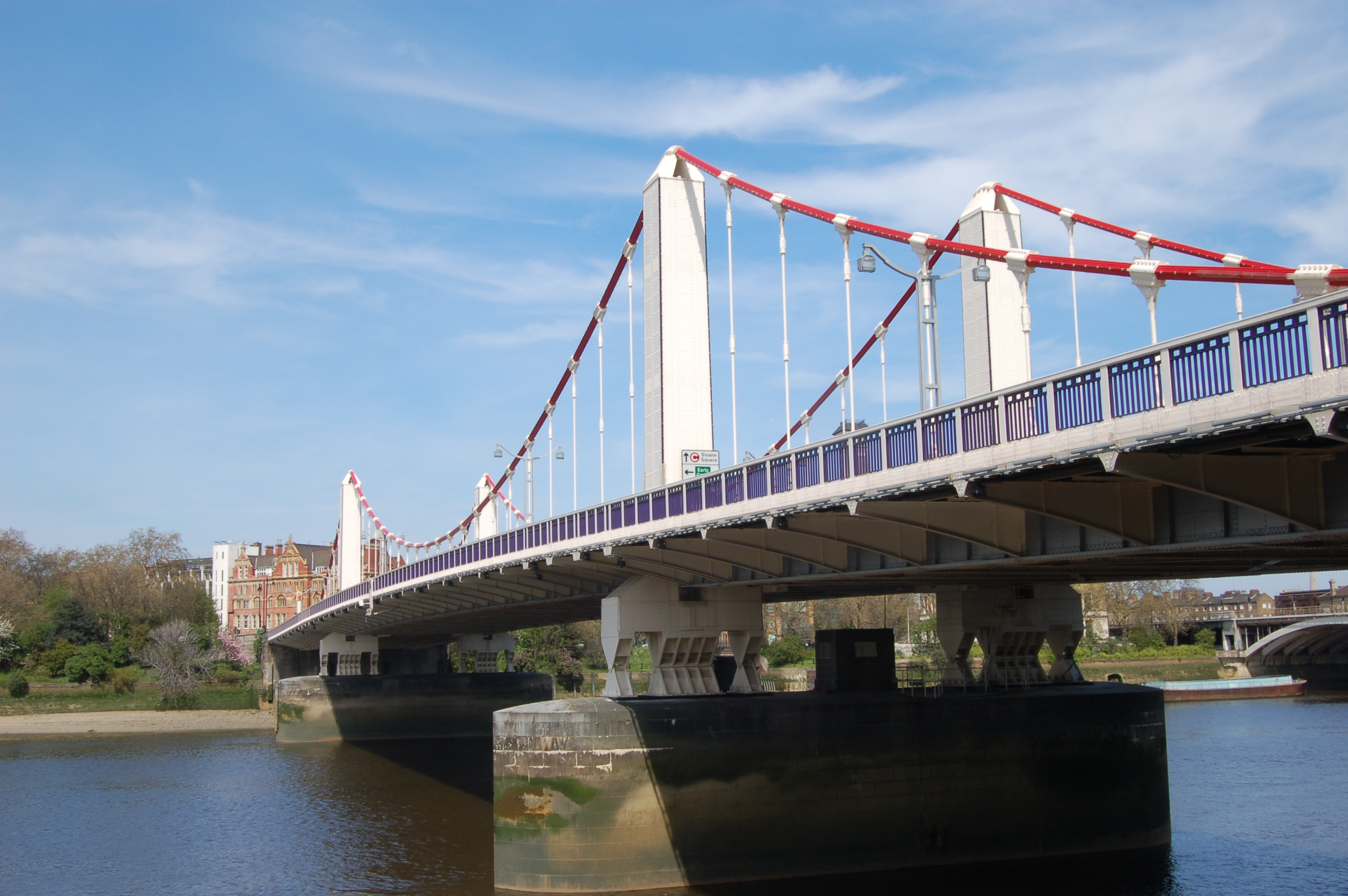
- Coordinates: 51°29′5″N 0°9′0″W
- Carries: A3216 road
- Crosses: River Thames
- Locale: Battersea and Chelsea, London
- Maintained by: Kensington and Chelsea London Borough Council
- Heritage status: Grade II listed structure
- Preceded by: Albert Bridge
- Followed by: Grosvenor Railway Bridge

Characteristics
- Design: Self-anchored suspension bridge
- Material: Steel
- Total length: 698 feet (213 m)
- Width: 64 feet (20 m)
- Height: 69 feet 2 inches (21.08 m)
- Longest span: 332 feet (101 m)
- No. of spans: 3
- Piers in water: 2
- Clearance below: 42 feet 9 inches (13.03 m) at lowest astronomical tide

History
- Designer: G. Topham Forrest and E. P. Wheeler
- Opened: 6 May 1937; 88 years ago
- Replaces: Victoria Bridge (1858–1935), also known as Old Chelsea Bridge

Statistics
- Daily traffic: 29,375 vehicles (2004)

Location
- Interactive map of Chelsea Bridge

Chelsea Bridge is a bridge over the River Thames in west London, connecting Chelsea on the north bank to Battersea on the south bank, and split between the City of Westminster, the London Borough of Wandsworth and the Royal Borough of Kensington and Chelsea. There have been two Chelsea Bridges, on the site of what was an ancient ford.

The first Chelsea Bridge was proposed in the 1840s as part of a major development of marshlands on the south bank of the Thames into the new Battersea Park. It was a suspension bridge intended to provide convenient access from the densely populated north bank to the new park. Although built and operated by the government, tolls were charged initially in an effort to recoup the cost of the bridge. Work on the nearby Chelsea Embankment delayed construction and so the bridge, initially called Victoria Bridge, did not open until 1858. Although well-received architecturally, as a toll bridge it was unpopular with the public, and Parliament felt obliged to make it toll-free on Sundays. The bridge was less of a commercial success than had been anticipated, partly because of competition from the newly built Albert Bridge nearby. It was acquired by the Metropolitan Board of Works in 1877, and the tolls were abolished in 1879.

The bridge was narrow and structurally unsound, leading the authorities to rename it Chelsea Bridge to avoid the royal family's association with a potential collapse. In 1926 it was proposed that the old bridge be rebuilt or replaced, due to the increased volume of users from population growth, and the introduction of the automobile. It was demolished during 1934–1937, and replaced by the current structure, which opened in 1937.

The new bridge was the first self-anchored suspension bridge in Britain, and was built entirely with materials sourced from within the British Empire. During the early 1950s it became popular with motorcyclists, who staged regular races across the bridge. One such meeting in 1970 erupted into violence, resulting in the death of one man and the imprisonment of 20 others. Chelsea Bridge is floodlit from below during the hours of darkness, when the towers and cables are illuminated by 936 feet (285 m) of light-emitting diodes. In 2008 it achieved Grade II listed status. In 2004 a footbridge was opened beneath the southern span, carrying the Thames Path under the bridge.

== Background ==
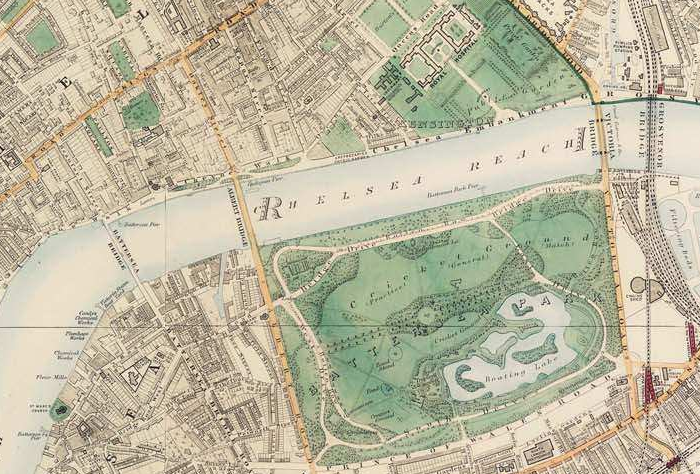
Chelsea and Battersea in 1891, showing (left to right) Old Battersea Bridge, Albert Bridge, Victoria (now Chelsea) Bridge and Grosvenor Bridge.

The Red House Inn was an isolated inn on the south bank of the River Thames in the marshlands by Battersea fields, about one mile (1.6 km) east of the developed street of the prosperous farming village of Battersea. Not on any major road, its isolation and lack of any police presence made it a popular destination for visitors from London and Westminster since the 16th century, who would travel to the Red House by wherry, attracted by Sunday dog fighting, bare-knuckle boxing bouts and illegal horse racing. Because of its lawless nature, Battersea Fields was also a popular area for duelling, and was the venue for the 1829 duel between the then Prime Minister the Duke of Wellington and the Earl of Winchilsea.

The town of Chelsea, on the north bank of the Thames about three miles (4.8 km) west of Westminster, was an important industrial centre. Although by the 19th century its role as the centre of the British porcelain industry had been overtaken by the West Midlands, its riverside location and good roads made it an important centre for the manufacture of goods to serve the nearby and rapidly growing London.

The Chelsea Waterworks Company occupied a site on the north bank of the Thames opposite the Red House Inn. Founded in 1723, the company pumped water from the Thames to reservoirs around Westminster through a network of hollow elm trunks. As London spread westwards, the former farmland to the west became increasingly populated, (Note: Between the 1801 and 1881 censuses, the population of Battersea rose from 3,000 to 107,000.) and the Thames became seriously polluted with sewage and animal carcasses. In 1852 Parliament banned water from being taken from the Thames downstream of Teddington, forcing the Chelsea Waterworks Company to move upstream to Seething Wells.

Since 1771, Battersea and Chelsea had been linked by the modest wooden Battersea Bridge. As London grew following the advent of the railways, Chelsea began to become congested, and in 1842 the Commission of Woods, Forests, and Land Revenues recommended the building of an embankment at Chelsea to free new land for development, and proposed the building of a new bridge downstream of Battersea Bridge and the replacement of Battersea Bridge with a more modern structure.

=== Battersea Park ===
In the early 1840s Thomas Cubitt and James Pennethorne had proposed a plan to use 150,000 tons of rocks and earth from the excavation of the Royal Victoria Dock to infill the marshy Battersea Fields and create a large public park to serve the growing population of Chelsea. In 1846 the Commissioners of Woods and Forests purchased the Red House Inn and 200 acres (0.81 km^{2}) of surrounding land, and work began on the development that would become Battersea Park. It was expected that with the opening of the park the volume of cross river traffic would increase significantly, putting further strain on the dilapidated Battersea Bridge.

Consequently, the Battersea Bridge and Embankment, etc. Act 1846 (9 & 10 Vict. c. 39) authorised the building of a new toll bridge on the site of an ancient ford exactly one mile (1.6 km) downstream of Battersea Bridge. (Note: Although embankments have raised the water level and a channel in the centre of the river is now dredged, the river is very shallow at this point. In 1948, after dredging had been suspended owing to the Second World War, it was possible to walk across the river at low tide.) The approach road on the southern side was to run along the side of the new park, while that on the northern side was to run from Sloane Square, through the former Chelsea Waterworks site, to the new bridge. Although previous toll bridges in the area had been built and operated by private companies, the new bridge was to be built and operated by the government, under the control of the Metropolitan Improvement Commission, despite protests in Parliament from Radicals objecting to the government profiting from a toll-paying bridge. It was intended that the bridge would be made toll-free once the costs of building it had been recouped.

== Victoria Bridge (Old Chelsea Bridge) ==
Engineer Thomas Page was appointed to build the bridge, and presented the commission with several potential designs, including a seven-span stone bridge, a five-span cast iron arch bridge, and a suspension bridge. The commission selected the suspension bridge design, and work began in 1851 on the new bridge, to be called the Victoria Bridge.

=== Design and construction ===
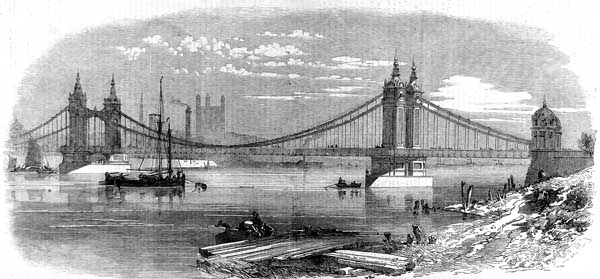
The first Chelsea Bridge as seen from Battersea in 1858, shortly after opening. The Victoria Tower of the Palace of Westminster is shown under construction in the background.

Page's design was typical of suspension bridges of the period, and consisted of a wrought iron deck and four 97-foot (30 m) cast iron towers supporting chains, which in turn supported the weight of the deck. The towers rested on a pair of timber and cast iron piers. The towers passed through the deck, meaning that between the towers the road was seven feet (2.1 m) narrower than on the rest of the bridge. Although work had begun in 1851 delays in the closure of the Chelsea Waterworks, which only completed its relocation to Seething Wells in 1856, caused lengthy delays to the project, and the Edinburgh-made ironwork was only transported to the site in 1856.

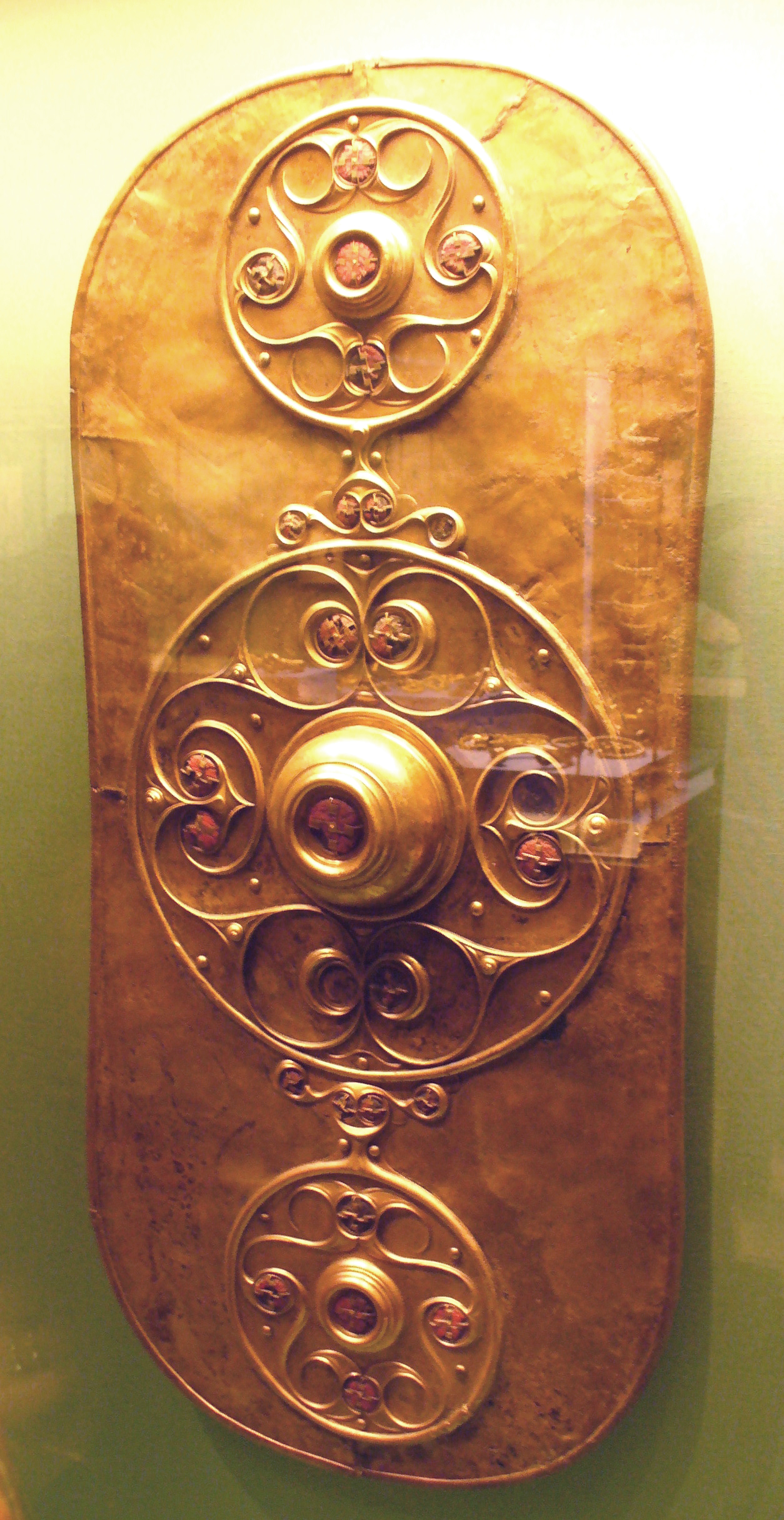
The Battersea Shield

Victoria Bridge was 703 feet (214 m) long with a central span of 333 feet (101 m), and the roadway was 32 feet (9.8 m) wide with a 7-foot-6-inch (2.29 m) footpath on either side, making a total width of 47 feet (14 m). Large lamps were set at the tops of the four towers, which were only to be lit when Queen Victoria was spending the night in London. The central span was inscribed with the date of construction and the words "Gloria Deo in Excelsis" ("Glory to God in the Highest"). It took seven years to build, at a total cost of £90,000 (about £9.67 million in 2025). The controversial tolls were collected from octagonal stone tollhouses at each end of the bridge.

As with the earlier construction of nearby Battersea Bridge, during excavations workers found large quantities of Roman and Celtic weapons and skeletons in the riverbed, leading many historians to conclude that the area was the site of Julius Caesar's crossing of the Thames during the 54 BC invasion of Britain. The most significant item found was the Celtic La Tène style bronze and enamel Battersea Shield, one of the most important pieces of Celtic military equipment found in Britain, recovered from the riverbed during dredging for the piers. (Note: As it shows no signs of battle damage, it is believed that the shield was cast into the river as a votive offering and was never used in battle. The shield is now on display in the British Museum while a replica is housed in the Museum of London.)

=== Opening ===
A fairy structure, with its beautiful towers, gilded and painted to resemble light coloured bronze, and crowned with globular lamps, diffusing light all around.

— Illustrated London News, 25 September 1858

On 31 March 1858 Queen Victoria, accompanied by two of her daughters and en route to the formal opening of Battersea Park, crossed the new bridge and declared it officially open, naming it the Victoria Bridge; it was opened to the public three days later, on 3 April 1858. The design met with great critical acclaim, particularly from the Illustrated London News.

Shortly after its opening, concerns were raised about the bridge's safety. Following an inspection by John Hawkshaw and Edwin Clark in 1861, an additional support chain was added on each side. Despite the strengthening there were still concerns about its soundness, and a weight limit of 5 tons was imposed. At the same time, the name was changed from Victoria Bridge to Chelsea Bridge, as the government was concerned about the reliability of suspension bridges and did not want a potential collapse to be associated with the Queen.

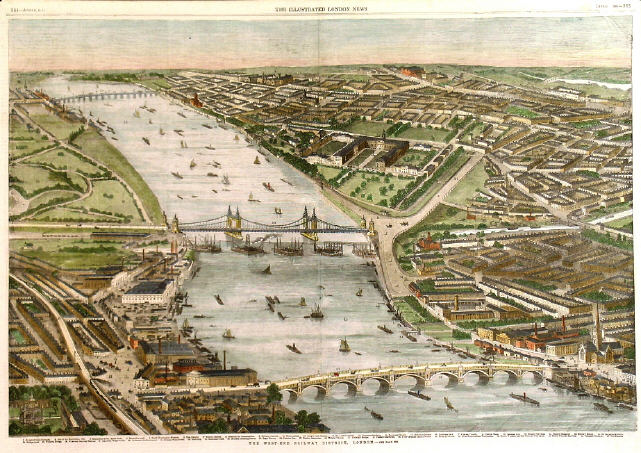
Battersea (top), Victoria (centre) and Vauxhall (bottom) bridges, 1859

Although reasonably well used, it was unpopular with the public, who objected to being obliged to pay tolls to use it. On 4 July 1857, almost a year before the bridge's opening, a demonstration against the tolls attracted 6,000 residents. Concerns were raised in Parliament that poorer industrial workers in Chelsea, which had no large parks of its own, would be unable to afford to use the new park in Battersea. Bowing to public pressure, shortly after the bridge opened Parliament declared it free to use for pedestrians on Sundays, and in 1875 it was also made toll-free on public holidays. Additionally, because the main lights were only turned on when Queen Victoria was staying in London, it was poorly used at night. Despite this, the new Battersea Park was extremely popular, particularly the sporting facilities; on 9 January 1864 the park staged the world's first official game of association football. (Note: An earlier unofficial match had been played under Football Association rules on 19 December 1863 in Mortlake between Barnes Club and Richmond F.C., both of whom later went on to join the Rugby Football Union.)

=== Abolition of tolls ===
In 1873 the privately owned Albert Bridge, between Chelsea and Battersea bridges, opened. Although Albert Bridge was not as successful as intended at luring customers from Chelsea Bridge and soon found itself in serious financial difficulties, it nonetheless caused a sharp drop in usage of Chelsea Bridge. The Metropolis Toll Bridges Act 1877 (40 & 41 Vict. c. xcix) was passed, which allowed the Metropolitan Board of Works (MBW) to buy all London bridges between Hammersmith and Waterloo bridges and free them from tolls. Ownership of Chelsea Bridge was transferred to the MBW in 1877 at a cost of £75,000 (about £7.05 million in 2025), and on 24 May 1879 Chelsea Bridge, Battersea Bridge and Albert Bridge were declared toll free by the Prince of Wales in a brief ceremony, after which a parade of Chelsea Pensioners marched across the bridge to Battersea Park.

Its kiosques and gilt finials, its travesty of Gothic architecture in cast iron, its bad construction and its text of 'Gloria Deo in Excelsis' above the arch between the piers, are redolent of 1851, the year of the Great Exhibition, the locus classicus of bad art, false enthusiasms and shams.

— Reginald Blomfield, 1921

By the early 20th century, Chelsea Bridge was in poor condition. It was unable to carry the increasing volume of traffic caused by the growth of London and the increasing usage of the automobile; between 1914 and 1929 use of the bridge almost doubled from 6,500 to 12,600 vehicles per day. In addition, parts of its structure were beginning to work loose, and in 1922 the gilded finials on the towers had to be removed because of concerns that they would fall off. Architectural opinion had turned heavily against Victorian styles and Chelsea Bridge was now deeply unpopular with architects; former President of the Royal Institute of British Architects Reginald Blomfield spoke vehemently against its design in 1921, and there were few people supporting the preservation of the old bridge. In 1926 the Royal Commission on Cross-river Traffic recommended that Chelsea Bridge be rebuilt or replaced.

== New Chelsea Bridge ==
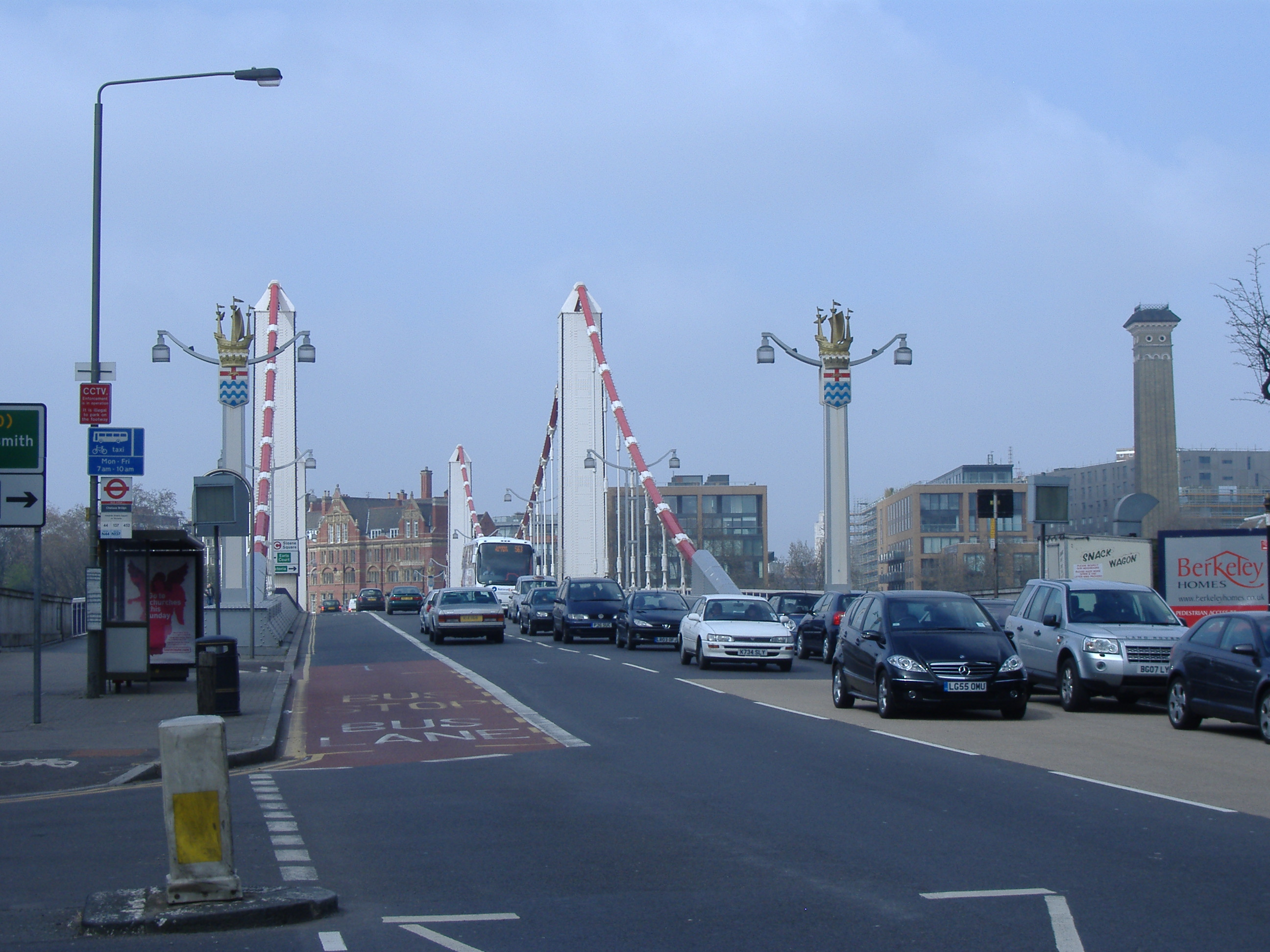
With four lanes of traffic, the new bridge's roadway is much wider than that of its predecessor.

In 1931 the London County Council (LCC) proposed demolishing Chelsea Bridge and replacing it with a modern six-lane bridge at a cost of £695,000 (about £40.9 million in 2025). Because of the economic crisis of the Great Depression the Ministry of Transport refused to fund the project and the LCC was unable to raise the funds elsewhere. However, in an effort to boost employment in the Battersea area, which had suffered badly in the depression, the Ministry of Transport agreed to underwrite 60% of the costs of a cheaper four-lane bridge costing £365,000 (about £21.5 million in 2025), on condition that all materials used in the building of the bridge be sourced from within the British Empire.

=== Design and construction ===
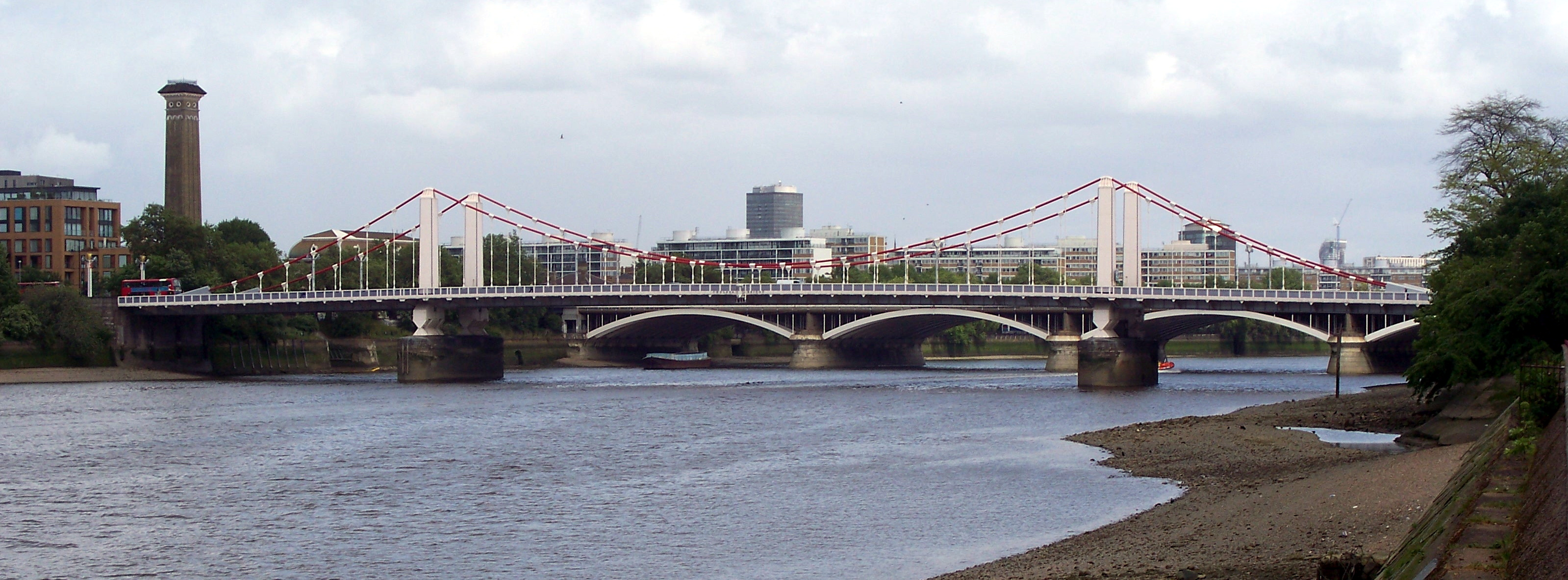
Being self-anchored, the bridge uniquely in London has no anchoring abutments.

In 1934 a temporary footbridge which had previously been used during rebuilding works on Lambeth Bridge was moved into place alongside Chelsea Bridge, and demolition began. The new bridge, also called Chelsea Bridge, was designed by LCC architects G. Topham Forrest and E. P. Wheeler and built by Holloway Brothers (London). Much wider than the older bridge at 64 feet (20 m) wide, it has a 40-foot (12 m) wide roadway and two 12-foot (3.7 m) wide pavements cantilevered out from the sides of the bridge. Uniquely in London, Chelsea Bridge is a self-anchored suspension bridge, the first of the type to be built in Britain. The horizontal stresses are absorbed by stiffening girders in the deck itself and the suspension cables are not anchored to the ground, relieving stress on the abutments which are built on soft and unstable London clay. The piers of the new bridge were built on the site of the old bridge's piers, and are built of concrete, faced with granite above the low-water point. Each side of the bridge has a single suspension cable, each made up of 37 7/8-inch (23mm) diameter wire ropes bundled to form a hexagonal cable. As was agreed with the Ministry of Transport, all materials used in the bridge came from the British Empire; the steel came from Scotland and Yorkshire, the granite of the piers from Aberdeen and Cornwall, the timbers of the deck from British Columbia and the asphalt of the roadway from Trinidad.

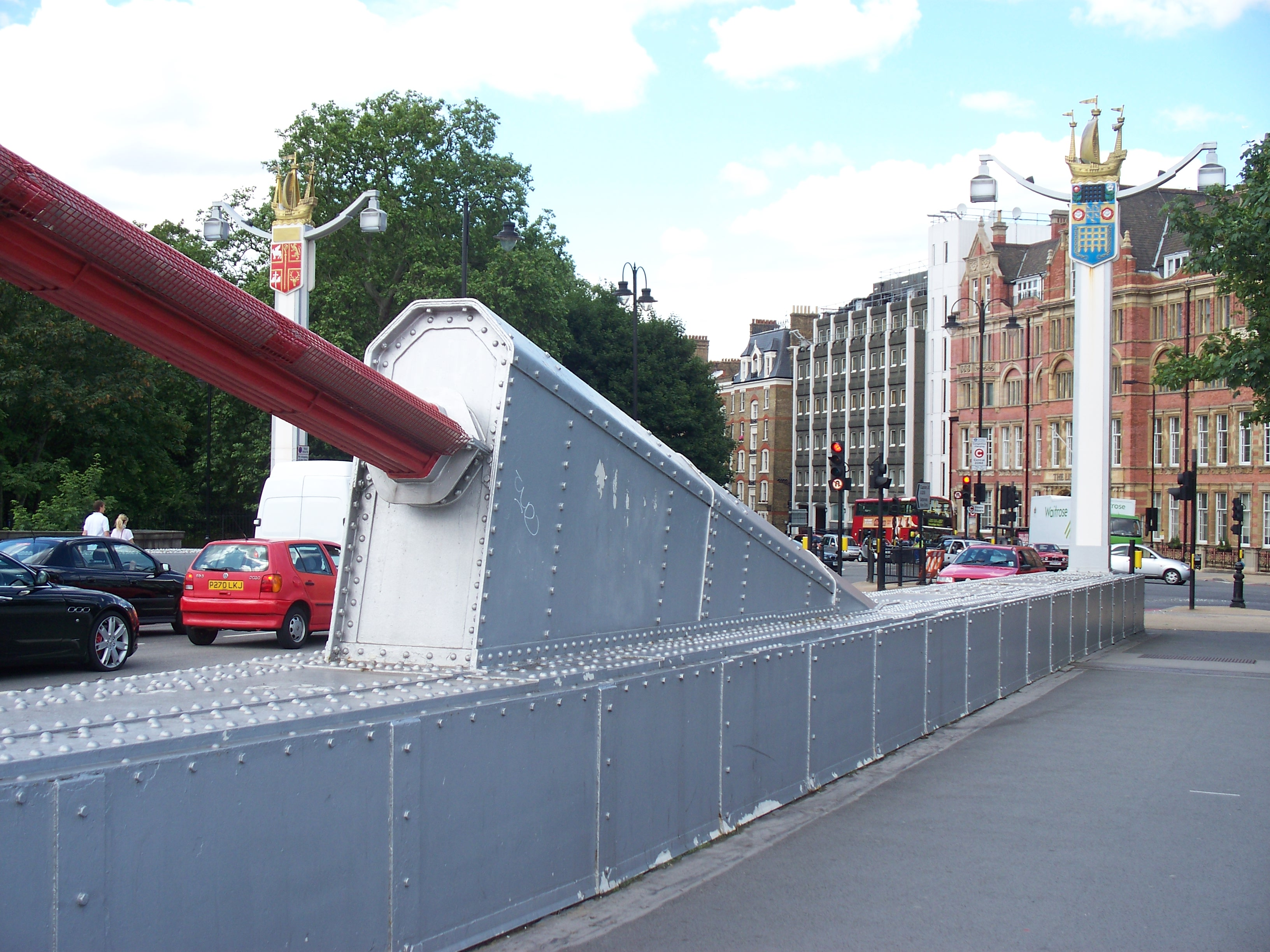
As a self-anchored bridge, the suspension cables attach directly to the deck and do not extend to the ground.

Because the self-anchored structure relies on the roadway itself to absorb stresses, the suspension cables could not be installed until the roadway was built; however, until the cables were in place the roadway could not be supported. To resolve this problem, Topham had the roadway built in sections, supported on very tall barges. The barges were floated into place at low tide, and the rising tide was used to lift the sections above the height of the piers. As the tide ebbed, the roadway dropped into place.

The recently built Battersea Power Station then dominated most views of the area, so it was decided that the bridge's appearance was unimportant. Consequently, in contrast to the heavily ornamented 1858 bridge, the new bridge has a starkly utilitarian design and the only ornamentation consists of two ornamental lamp posts at each entrance. Each features a gilded galleon on top of a coat of arms. The outward facing sides of all four posts show the LCC coat of arms of the Lion of England, St George's Cross and the barry wavy lines representing the Thames; the inward faces on the south side show the dove of peace of the Metropolitan Borough of Battersea, that on the northwest corner shows the winged bull, lion, boars' heads and stag of the Metropolitan Borough of Chelsea, and that on the northeast corner the portcullis and Tudor roses of the Metropolitan Borough of Westminster.

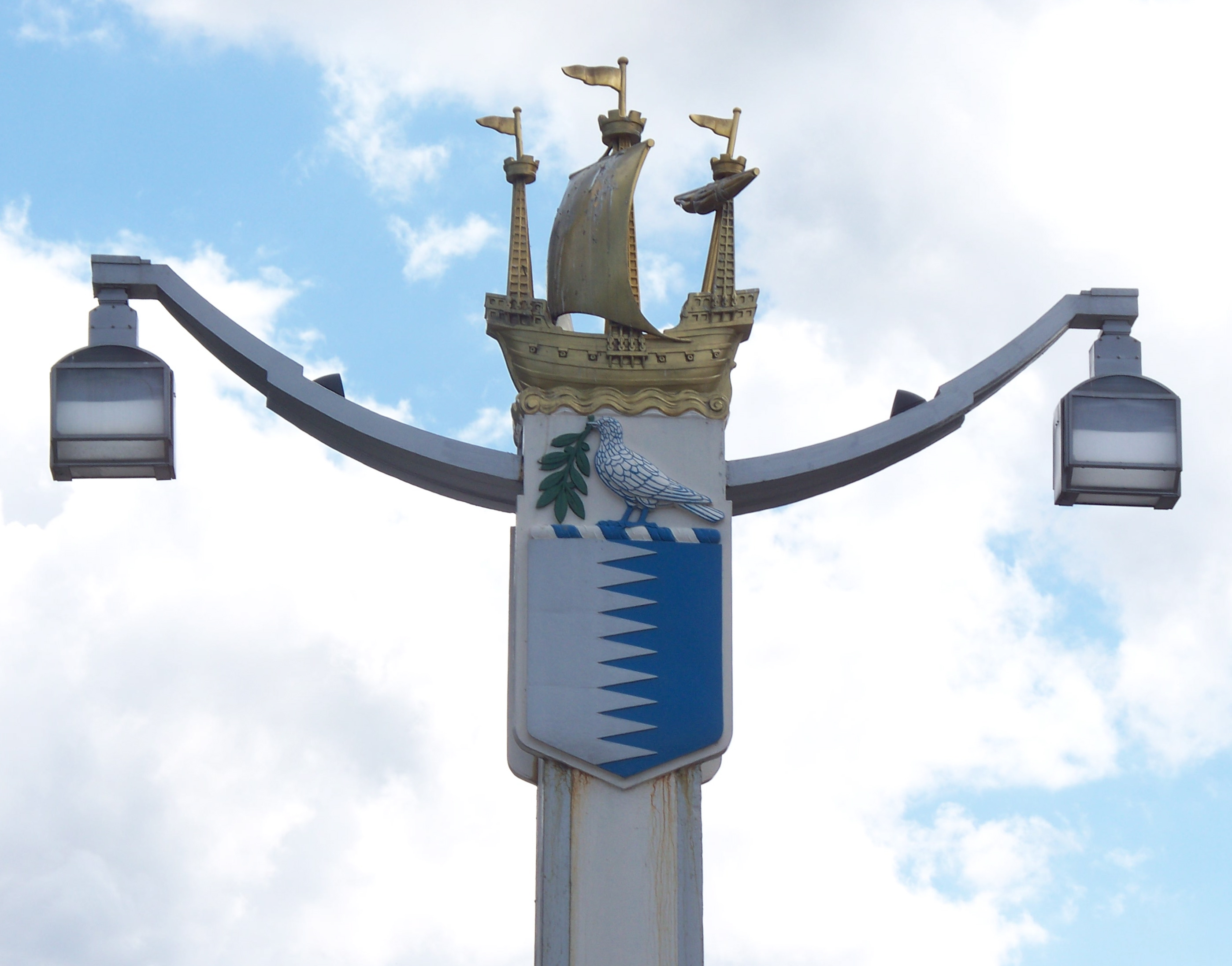
Coat of arms of the Metropolitan Borough of Battersea on a Chelsea Bridge lamp post

The new bridge was completed five months ahead of schedule and within the £365,000 budget. It was opened on 6 May 1937 by the Prime Minister of Canada, William Lyon Mackenzie King, who was in London for the coronation of King George VI and Queen Elizabeth. (Note: Although Thames bridges were traditionally opened by members of the royal family or leading London politicians, King was invited to perform the ceremony in honour of the roadway's being lined with British Columbian Douglas Fir.)

=== Temporary wartime bridge ===
Two years after the bridge's opening the Second World War broke out. Because of their close proximity to Chelsea Barracks it was expected that enemy bombers would target the three road bridges in the area, and a temporary bridge was built parallel to Chelsea Bridge. As with the four other temporary Thames bridges built in this period, it was built of steel girders supported by wooden stakes; however, despite its flimsy appearance it was a sturdy structure, capable of supporting tanks and other heavy military equipment. As it turned out, no enemy action took place in the area, and all three bridges survived the war undamaged. The temporary bridge was dismantled in 1945.

=== Motorcycle gangs ===
Beginning in the 1950s, Chelsea Bridge became a favourite meeting place for motorcyclists, who would race across the bridge on Friday nights. On 17 October 1970 a serious confrontation took place on Chelsea Bridge between the Essex and Chelsea chapters of the Hells Angels, and rival motorcycle gangs the Road Rats, Nightingales, Windsor Angels and Jokers. Around 50 people took part in the fight; weapons used included motorcycle chains, flick knives and at least one spiked flail. One member of the Jokers was shot with a sawn-off shotgun and fatally wounded, and 20 of those present were sentenced to between one and twelve years' imprisonment.

== Present-day ==
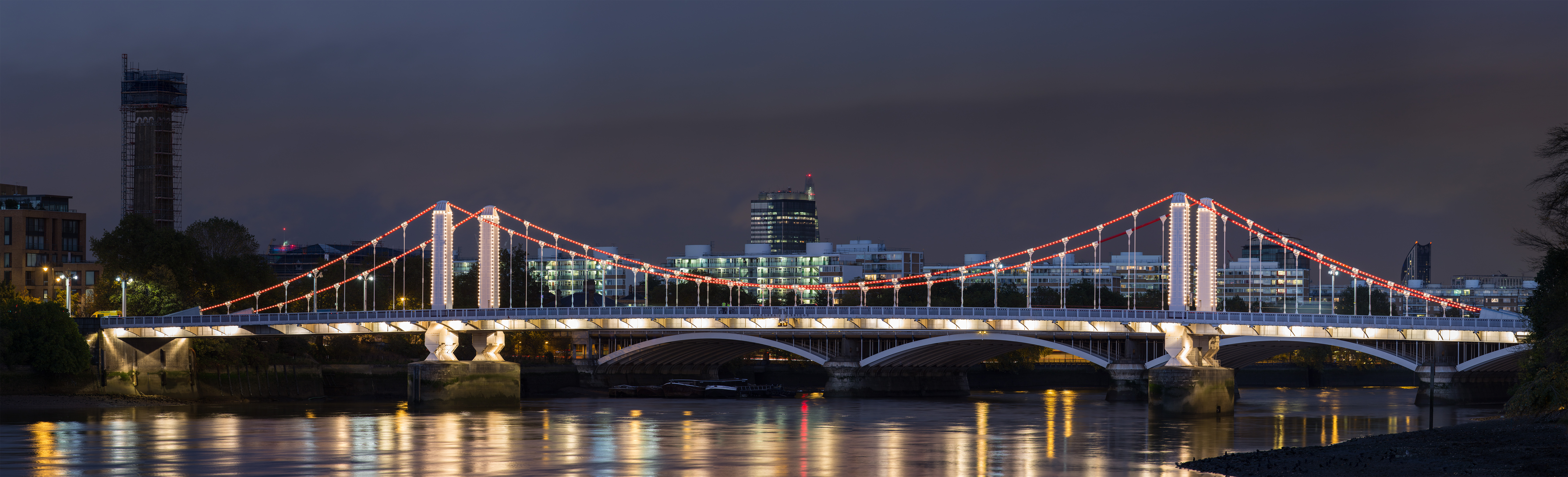
Chelsea Bridge's illuminations

In the 1970s Chelsea Bridge was painted bright red and white, prompting a number of complaints from Chelsea F.C. fans that Chelsea Bridge had been painted in Arsenal colours. In 2007 it was redecorated in a less controversial red, blue and white colour scheme. Chelsea Bridge is now floodlit from beneath at night and 936 feet (285 m) of light-emitting diodes strung along the towers and suspension chains, intended to complement the illuminations of the nearby Albert Bridge. Although motorcyclists still meet on the bridge, following complaints from residents about the noise their racing has been curtailed.

Chelsea Bridge was declared a Grade II listed structure in 2008, providing protection to preserve its character from further alteration. Battersea Park still retains Cubitt and Pennethorne's original layout and features, including a riverfront promenade, a formal avenue through the centre of the park and multiple animal enclosures.

On the eastern side of the bridge, at the southern end, a major new residential development of 600 homes called Chelsea Bridge Wharf has been built, as part of long-term plans to regenerate the long-derelict former industrial sites around Battersea Power Station.

=== Battersea footbridge ===
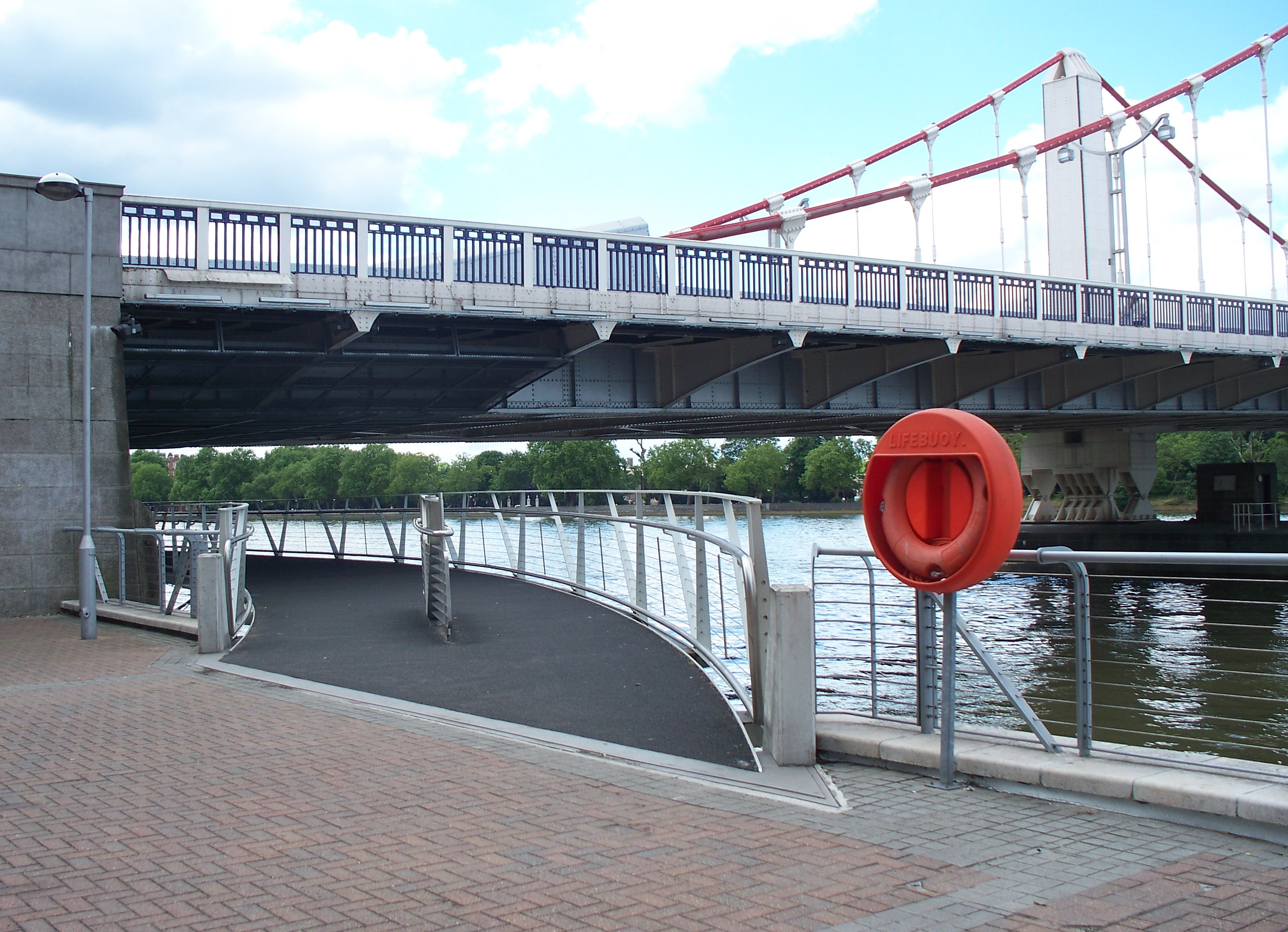
Battersea footbridge curves beneath Chelsea Bridge.

To link the new developments around Battersea Power Station to Battersea Park, in 2004 a curved footbridge was built beneath the southern end of Chelsea Bridge. The footbridge was built offsite in four sections, transported by road to the King George V Dock where it was assembled, and the completed structure floated down the river and hoisted into position. It is planned that once the riverfront in the area has been opened to the public, following the completion of the rebuilding of Battersea Power Station into a commercial development, the new bridge will form part of the Thames Path. The new bridge curves out from the bank, overhanging the river bank by 33 feet (10 m), and cost £600,000 to build.

== See also ==
- List of crossings of the River Thames
- List of bridges in London
