= Satans Slaves Motorcycle Club =

International outlaw motorcycle club

Satans Slaves MC
- Abbreviation: SSMC
- Founded: 1966; 60 years ago
- Founded at: Shipley, England
- Type: Outlaw motorcycle club
- Region served: Europe (29 chapters in England and Germany)
- Website: satans-slaves.com

The Satans Slaves Motorcycle Club (SSMC) is an international outlaw motorcycle club founded in Shipley, England in 1966. The Satans Slaves MC is one of the largest outlaw biker clubs in the United Kingdom and has 29 chapters in England and Germany.

== History ==
The Satans Slaves Motorcycle Club was founded in Shipley, West Yorkshire in 1966. Additional chapters were subsequently formed in Devon and on the East Coast of England. The club expanded into Scotland when a Fife chapter was established in Dunfermline. The Satans Slaves' Tayside faction was created in October 1986 after three bikers from Dundee began "prospecting" for the Fife chapter the previous year. The club was incorporated on 16 February 2004. In 2017, the Aquila biker club in Plymouth "patched over" to join the Satans Slaves.

The club is primarily based in Northern England with 17 English chapters There are also seven chapters in Germany, located in Gronau, Velbert, Metelen, Konz, Emsbüren, Langenfeld and Nienborg.

== Insignia ==
The Satans Slaves' insignia consists of a skull sporting long hair, and the club utilises a black-and-white colour scheme. Members wear the Satans Slaves' insignia and other patches, such as those denoting each member's rank within the club, on their "colours", a black sleeveless leather vest. The club uses the slogan "Slaves forever, forever Slaves", or "SFFS".

Insignia and clothing commonly feature the club’s skull emblem along with stylised lettering representing the abbreviated club name. The double “S” runic-style lettering is often incorporated into the design, including within the eyes of the skull graphic, and the phrase “SFFS” (“Slaves Forever, Forever Slaves”) is frequently displayed on patches and merchandise associated with the club.

== Membership and organisation ==
The Satans Slaves have 29 chapters, based in England and Germany. Each chapter is headed by an officer corps, consisting of a president, vice president, secretary, treasurer and sergeant-at-arms. The club is governed by strict hierarchies and rules, with mandatory requirements for membership including a motorcycle licence. The Satans Slaves have approximately 200 members in the United Kingdom.

== Criminal allegations and incidents ==
=== England ===
At a motorcycle event in Cookham on 17 September 1983 sponsored by the Windsor chapter of the Hells Angels, a fight broke out in a queue where Road Rats were lining up to gang rape a woman, 24 members of the Satans Slaves' Manchester chapter against members of the Road Rats of London. Two Road Rats bikers, Michael Harrison and Colin Hunting, were stabbed to death in a mass brawl involving axes, knives, chains, baseball bats and shotguns, but the remaining four were able to herd around two Satans Slaves into a barn, which they then set alight. The bodies of the two dead bikers were dumped at local hospitals and three people were hospitalised in stable condition. 46 men and five women were arrested and questioned at six local police stations in an investigation involving 70 officers. A Satans Slaves member was among eleven bikers imprisoned for a total of 55 years.

The Southampton Satans Slaves chapter was involved in a turf war with the Hells Angels' English Nomads chapter, which began after Hells Angels members Stephen Harris and Barry Burn were fired upon during a trip to Bristol. Nomads chapter president Harris was wounded in the arm while Burn escaped injury. Another Hells Angel, David McKenzie, was stabbed eight times after being attacked outside a pub in Gloucester months later. In April 1991, Stephen "Grumps" Cunningham, a leading member of the Nomads chapter and major amphetamine and cannabis dealer, lost his right hand when a car bomb targeting a Satans Slave biker exploded prematurely in Southampton. The Satans Slaves member targeted by Cunningham was the leader of a rival drug enterprise.

Members of the Sheffield chapter of the Satans Slaves allegedly carried out a serious assault on a man and his girlfriend at the Vintage Rock Bar in Doncaster on 18 December 2010.

The largest ever seizure of illegal firearms took place when a dozen sawn-off shotguns, rifles and pistols and over 2,000 rounds of ammunition were discovered during searches of a house in Holme and a farm outbuilding in Milnthorpe as part of a joint operation carried out by the North West regional organised crime unit TITAN along with the Cumbria Constabulary and the National Crime Agency (NCA) on 4 November 2015. A rented property at Morecambe was also searched. Paul Holmes, the alleged sergeant-at-arms of the Lancaster Satans Slaves chapter, pleaded guilty to fourteen charges relating to the possession of prohibited firearms and ammunition at Carlisle Crown Court on 6 June 2016. On 1 August 2016, Holmes was sentenced to fifteen years in prison.

A Satans Slave biker was involved in an altercation with a motorist following a collision between a group of club members on both English and German registered motorcycles and a Jeep Grand Cherokee in York on 12 August 2017.

On 19 June 2021, a group of Satans Slaves assaulted a patron at the Malt Shovel pub in Castleford after he intervened when a row broke out between the bikers and the pub landlord over COVID-19 regulations. Satans Slaves member Mark Isherwood pleaded guilty to assault occasioning actual bodily harm and was sentenced to six months in prison, suspended for 12 months, at Leeds Crown Court in November 2022.

=== Scotland ===
George "Pussy" Ritchie, a member of the Fife chapter of the Satans Slaves, was convicted of indecently assaulting a 15-year-old boy and sentenced to nine months' imprisonment in 1999. In October 2015, Ritchie was sentenced to eight years in prison and placed on the Violent and Sex Offender Register after pleading guilty at the High Court of Justiciary in Edinburgh to various sex offences, including attempted rape, committed against his niece and two other girls in Glenrothes, Burntisland and Dunfermline between 1977 and 1982.

A Satans Slaves biker was imprisoned in 1979 for brandishing a knife and confessing to plotting a £150,000 robbery.

Dundee gangster George Kerr survived being shot three times by a Satans Slaves member in a drug dispute at the Cutty Sark pub in 1993. The biker was also hospitalised as he was attacked after firing the shots.

In 2011, the Satans Slaves were reportedly involved in a biker war with the Blue Angels on Tayside.

A motorcycle procession of approximately 125 Satans Slaves members from across Scotland and England were travelling on the A7 road at Selkirk in the Scottish Borders, on 24 July 2021, when they began fighting with members of the Tribe, a support club for the Blue Angels. Satans Slaves member Barry Smith was acting as a support driver for the convoy when he drove his van into a motorcycle being driven by Andrew Lamb, a Tribe biker. Lamb suffered debilitating injuries and required urgent hospital treatment. Smith was convicted of attempted murder and breaching road traffic laws at the High Court in Edinburgh, on 10 July 2023. On 21 August 2023, he was sentenced to eight years in prison.
