= Dundee Stock Exchange =

Former stock exchange in Dundee, Scotland

The Dundee Stock Exchange was established in 1879. In 1964, it merged into the Scottish Stock Exchange along with the Glasgow Stock Exchange, Edinburgh Stock Exchange, and Aberdeen Stock Exchange. It continued to operate as a local branch until 1971, when the local exchanges closed completely. By 1973, the Scottish Stock Exchange had merged into the London Stock Exchange.

The archives of the Dundee Stock Exchange are held by Archive Services at the University of Dundee.
