= Glasgow Stock Exchange =

Stock exchange in the city of Glasgow, Scotland

Coordinates: 55.86177°N 4.25391°W

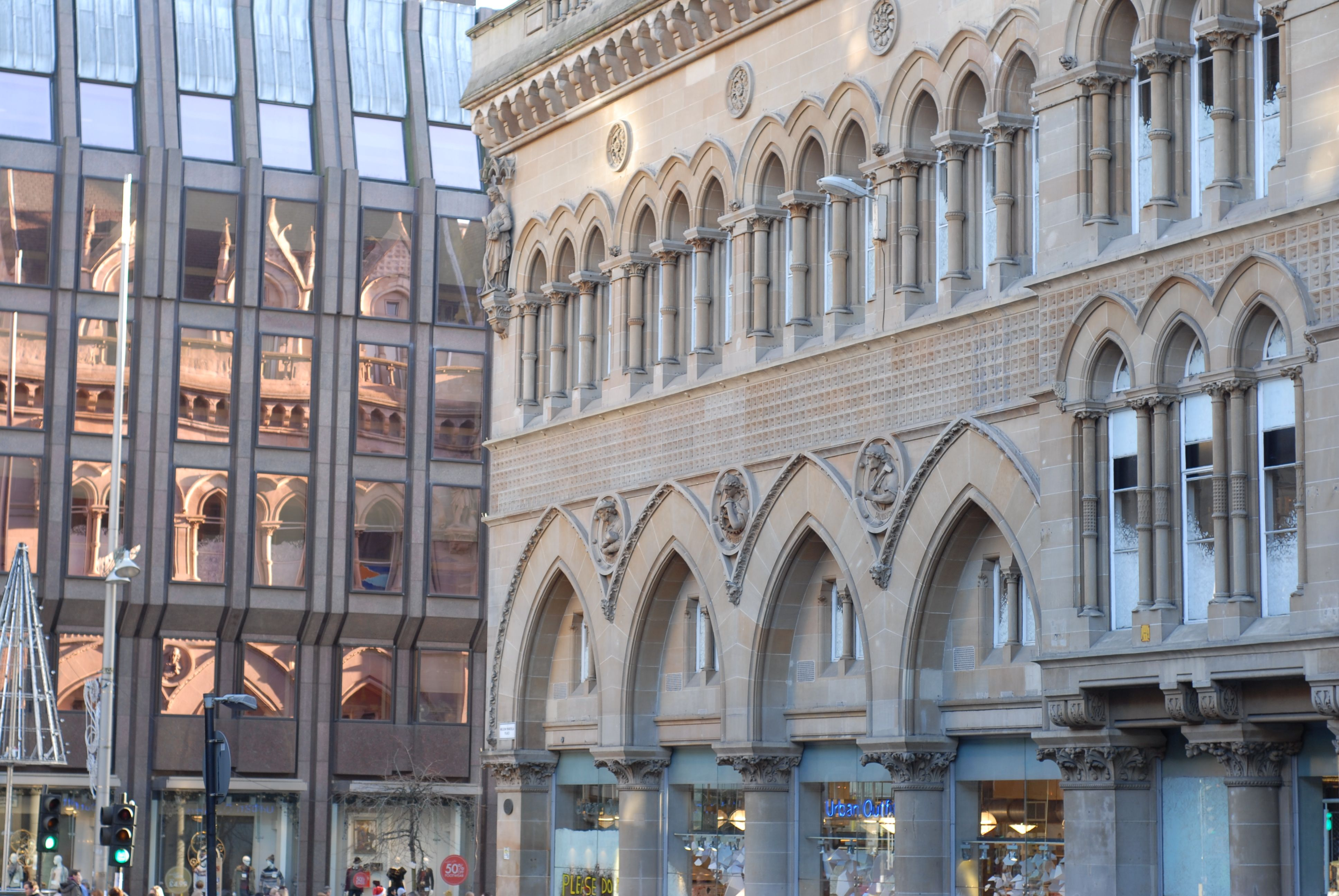
Stock Exchange Building, Glasgow, Nelson Mandela Place. John Burnet senior, 1875. Extended by JJ Burnet after 1894.

The Glasgow Stock Exchange is a prominent building and former financial institution in the centre of the city of Glasgow, Scotland.

The exchange was founded in 1844 and the current building was erected between 1875 and 1877. It is situated on the corner of Nelson Mandela Place (prior to 1986 known as St George's Place) and Buchanan Street and it was designed by John Burnet in the Venetian Gothic style, believed to have been inspired by the Royal Courts of Justice. In 1906, an extension designed by John James Burnet was added in St George's Place and the entire building was remodelled between 1969 and 1971 to house the merged Scottish Stock Exchange. The structure is now protected as a category A listed building. The building features sculpture by John Mossman, including three allegorical statues representing Industry, Commerce and Agriculture along with five roundels representing Science, Art, Building, Engineering and Mining.

On 2 January 1964, the Glasgow Stock Exchange merged with the three other main stock exchanges in Scotland: the Edinburgh Stock Exchange, Dundee Stock Exchange and Aberdeen Stock Exchange to form the Scottish Stock Exchange. The main secretariat of the exchange was in Glasgow, while the Edinburgh, Dundee, and Aberdeen exchanges operated as local branches until 1971, when the local exchanges closed completely and trading became centred in Glasgow.

During the reconstruction of the new Scottish Stock Exchange building in St George's Place, the exchange was housed in a converted warehouse on Ingram Street. The newly renovated building was opened after two years' work on 13 April 1971.

In 1973, the Scottish Stock Exchange merged with the London Stock Exchange and the Glasgow office and trading floor closed. As of 2019 the building is occupied by shops, government and other offices.

== Gallery ==
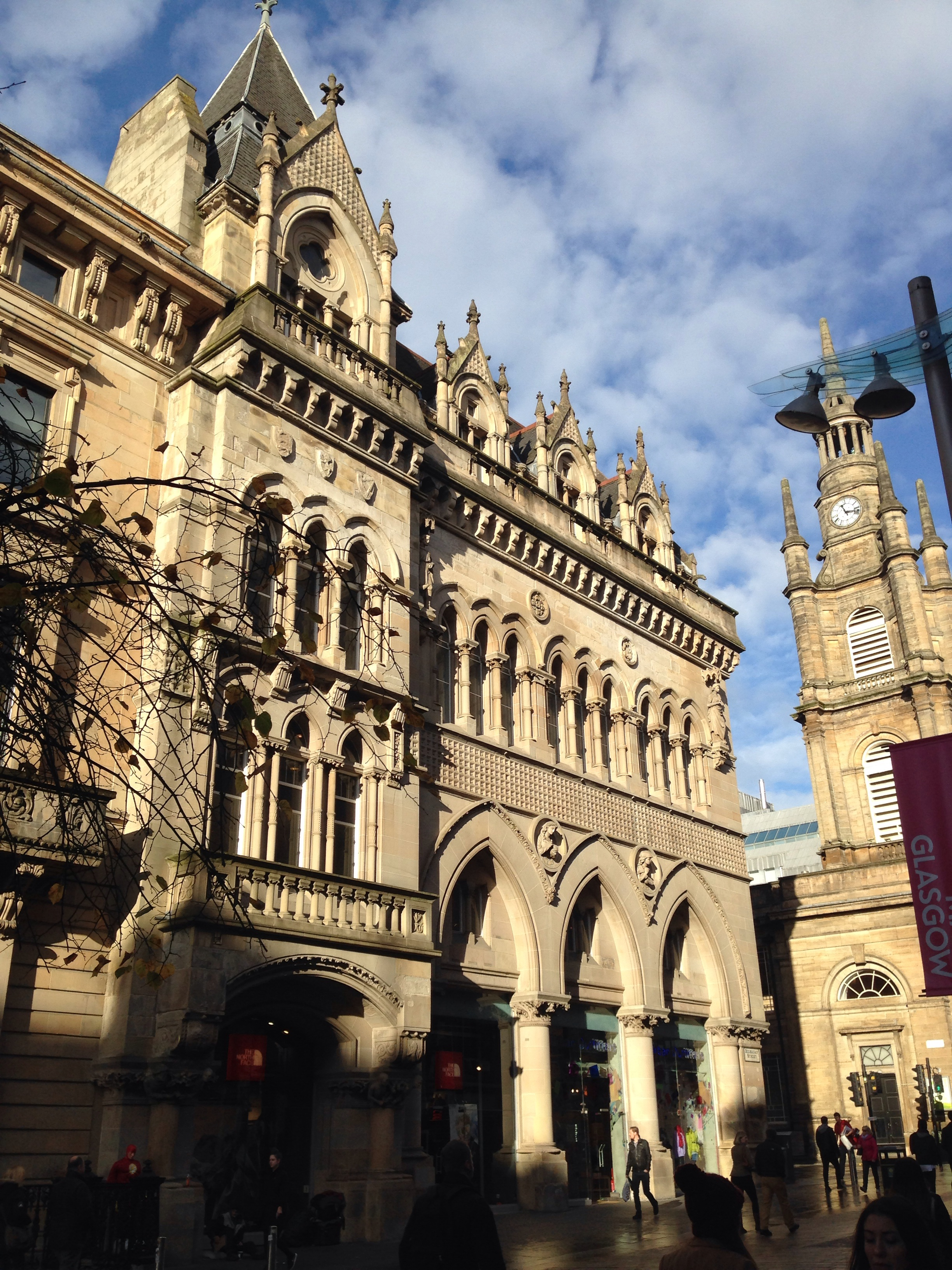

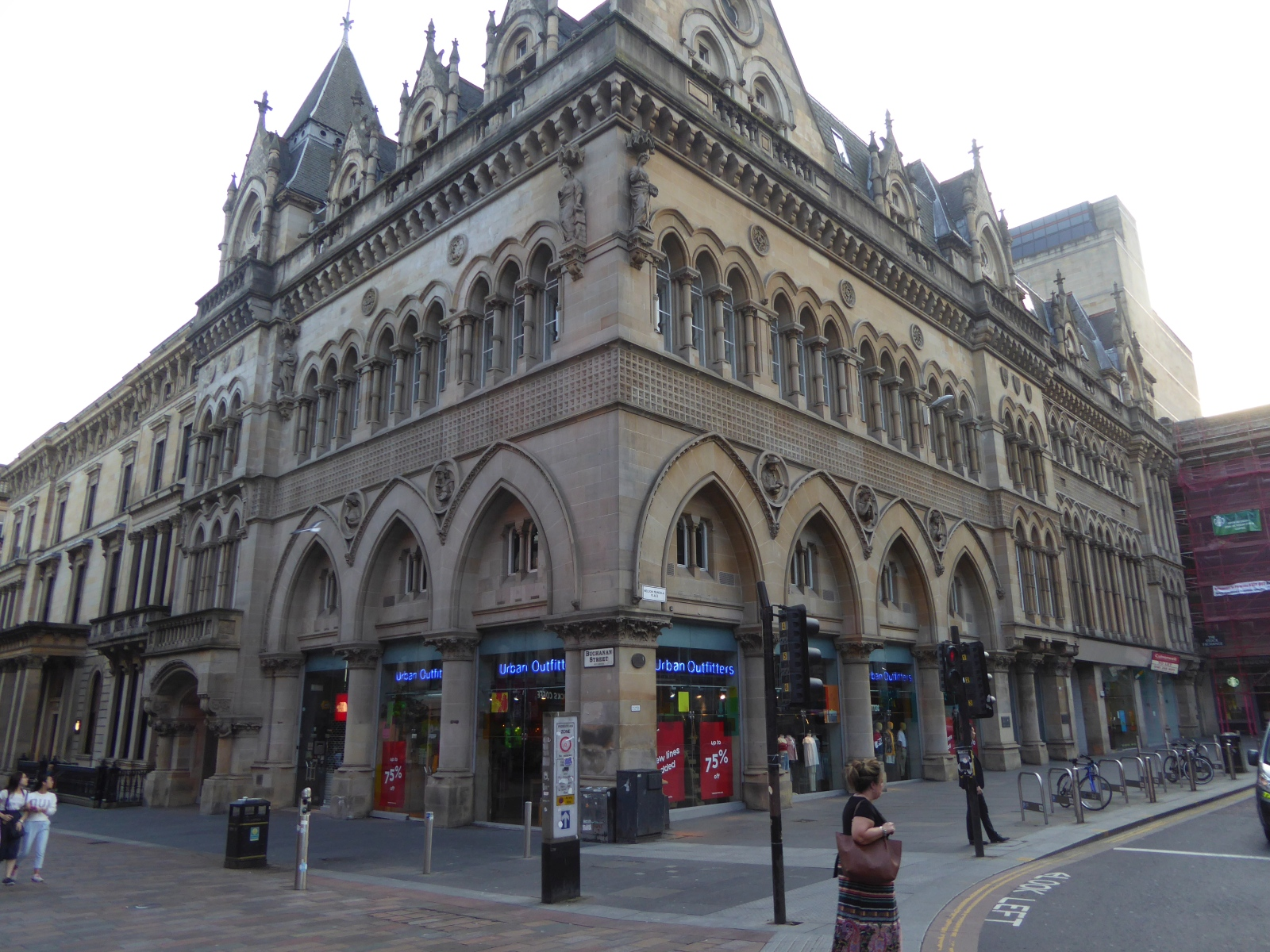

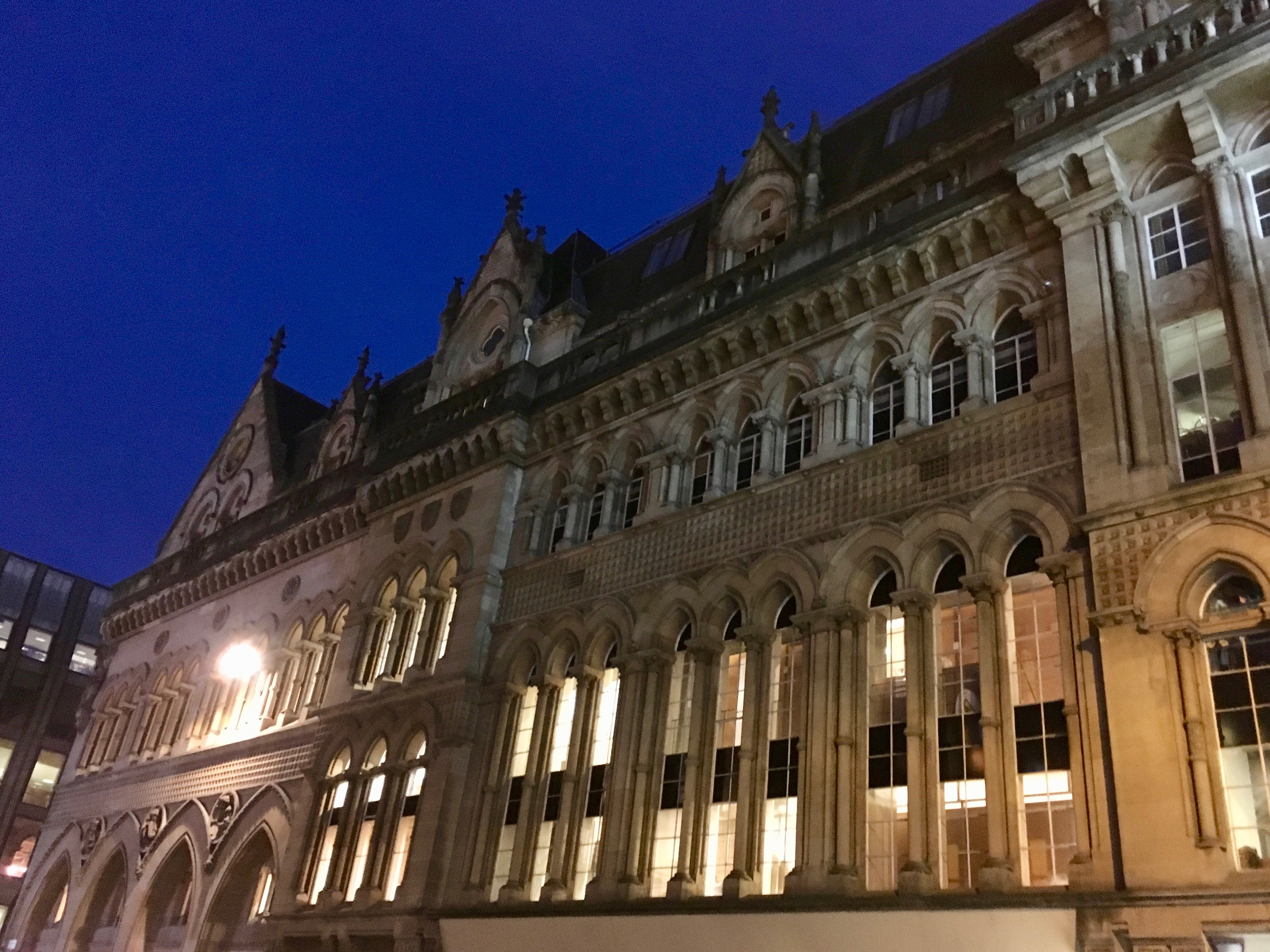

=== Close-ups ===
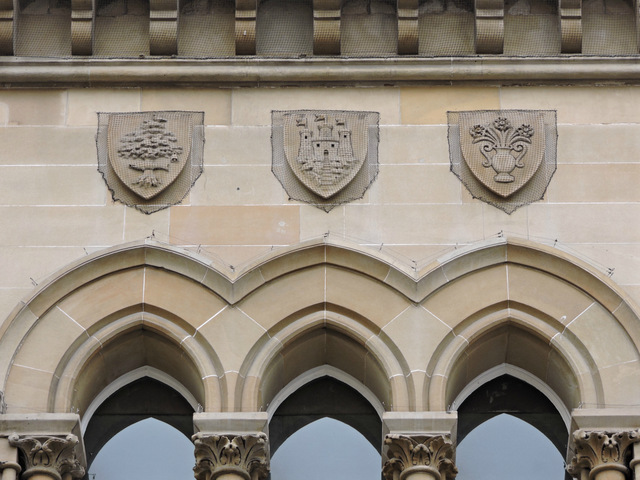
Glasgow, Edinburgh and Dundee coats of arms

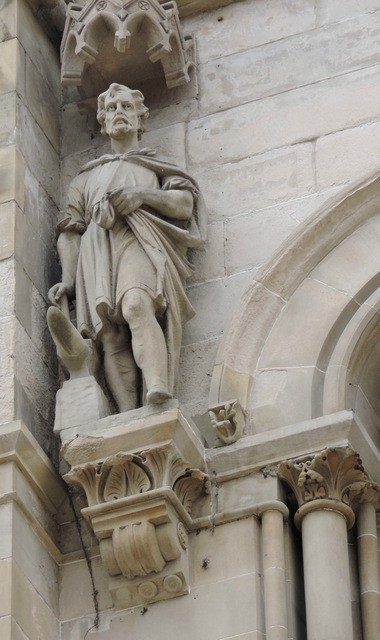
Industry

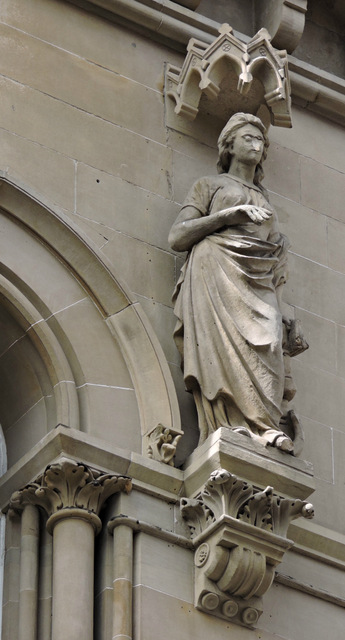
Agriculture

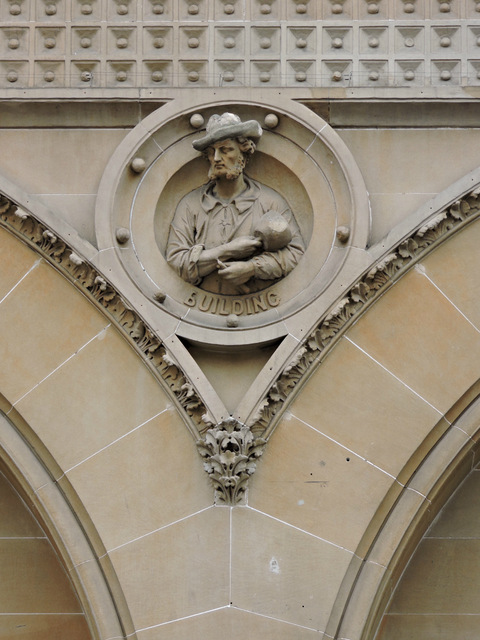
Building

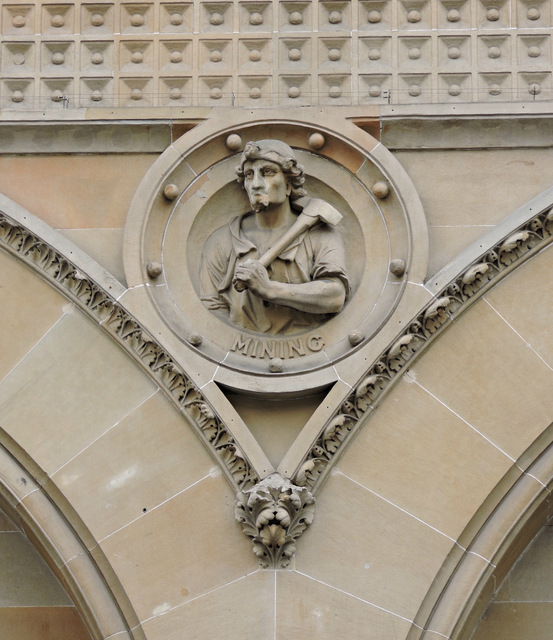
Mining

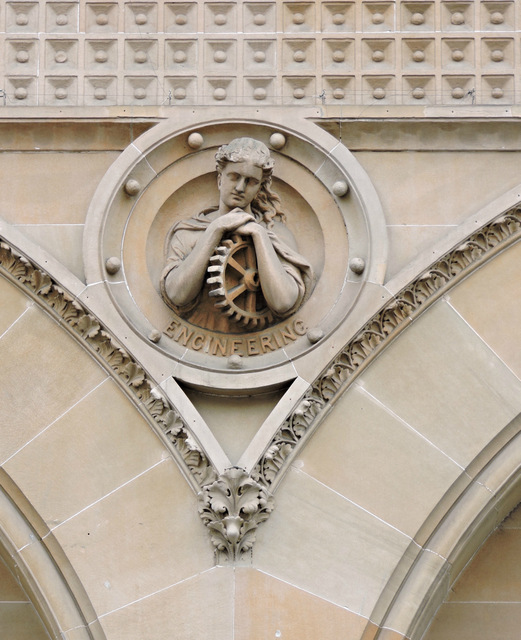
Engineering

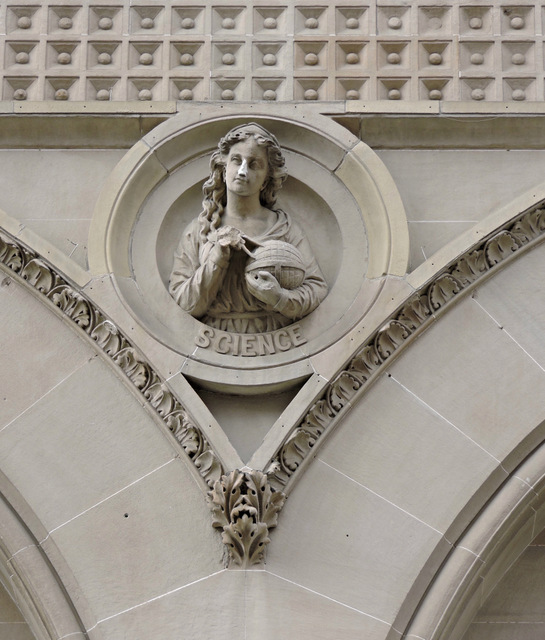
Science

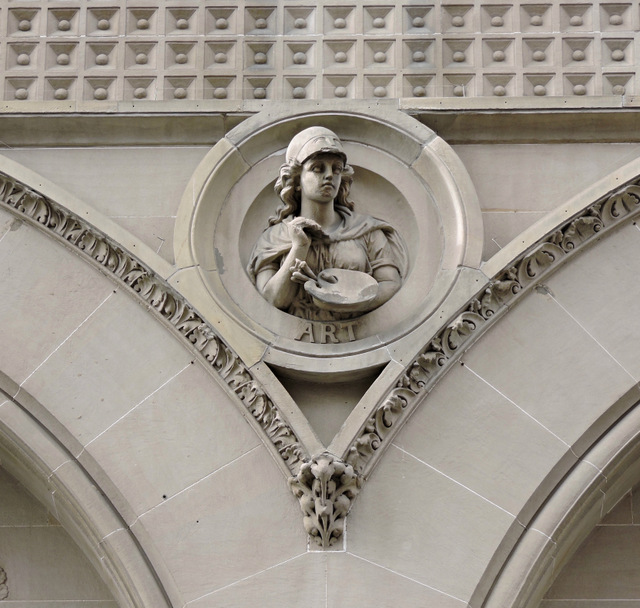
Art

== See also ==
- Edinburgh Stock Exchange
