= Road Rats Motorcycle Club =

English outlaw motorcycle club

Road Rats MC
- Abbreviation: RRMC, the Rats
- Founded: 1960s
- Founded at: London, England
- Type: Outlaw motorcycle club
- Region served: Greater London
- Website: roadratsmclondon.co.uk

The Road Rats Motorcycle Club (RRMC) is an English outlaw motorcycle club established in London in the 1960s. Arguably one of the "oldest and toughest motorcycle clubs in the country", the Road Rats are notorious for having fallen out with almost every motorcycle club in the United Kingdom and a few outside of the UK. The club became notable for its clashes with the English Hells Angels chapter, including a shooting on Chelsea Bridge, the Satans Slaves, in which two Road Rats were killed, and for murdering one of the founders of the Cycle Tramps motorcycle gang.

== History ==
The Road Rats initially emerged as a London street gang in the early 1960s before evolving into a motorcycle club.

In the late 1960s and early 1970s, a number of homegrown British outlaw biker clubs, in reaction to the international publicity of the Hells Angels in the United States, began adopting the Hells Angels' name and insignia without authorisation from the American club. In 1970, the Road Rats turned down an offer to begin "prospecting" for one such "bootleg" Hells Angels club, the Essex Nomads, as they were unwilling to cede their North London territory. The Road Rats became the leaders of an alliance against the Essex Nomads. On 17 October 1970, members of the Road Rats, the Nightingales, the Windsors and the Jokers engaged in a gang fight against the Essex Nomads and the Chelsea Nomads on Chelsea Bridge. Approximately sixty gang members armed with iron bars, motorcycle chains, maces and a shotgun participated. Two visiting members of the legitimate Zurich Hells Angels chapter had their "colours" stolen in the melee, resulting in the Angels' international president Sonny Barger sending two enforcers from California to enquire whether or not the official London Hells Angels chapter should have its charter revoked. This incident reportedly caused a feud between the Road Rats and the Hells Angels. On 2 November 1971, sixteen bikers were sentenced at the Old Bailey over the incident. Road Rats president Paul Luttman was sentenced to 12 years' imprisonment for the shooting of Essex Nomads member Peter Alan "Ginger Pete" Howson, who was wounded in the stomach with a shotgun. Luttman was acquitted of attempted murder but convicted of wounding with intent to cause grievous bodily harm, possession of a firearm, and possession of offensive weapons.

At a motorcycle event in Cookham on 18 September 1983 sponsored by the unsanctioned Windsor Hells Angels chapter, a fight broke out in a queue where bikers were lining up to gang rape a woman, pitting six Road Rats against 24 members of the Manchester chapter of the Satans Slaves. Two Road Rats bikers, Michael Harrison and Colin Hunting, were stabbed to death in a mass brawl involving axes, knives, chains, baseball bats and shotguns, but the remaining Road Rats were able to herd around twenty Satans Slaves into a barn, which they then set alight. The violence came to an end when the Hells Angels intervened. The bodies of the two dead bikers were dumped at local hospitals and three people were hospitalised in stable condition. 46 men and five women were arrested and questioned at six local police stations in an investigation involving 70 officers.

Road Rats member Patrick "Baby Rat" Boyle shot and killed Bruno "Brewer" Tessaro, the president of the Birmingham-based Cycle Tramps biker gang, outside the Carlisle pub on the Hastings seafront on 27 May 1989. The killing of Tessaro was in violation of an agreement among motorcycle gangs designating Hastings as neutral territory. Boyle was sentenced to life imprisonment for the murder on 28 March 1990 and later committed suicide in prison.

Currently there are other groups worldwide that represent the concept of Road Rat as a motorcycle club, for example, the Road Rat Riding Club RR18 https://roadrat.club created in 2006 and which has members in several countries in addition to Venezuela where it was created.
