= Project Heather =

Failed project for Scottish Stock Exchange

'Project Heather' Pròiseact Fraoich
- Type: Stock exchange
- Location: Edinburgh, Scotland
- Key people: Tomás Carruthers, Chief Executive
- Currency: Pound sterling

Project Heather (Scottish Gaelic: Pròiseact Fraoich) was the steering group for a proposed new Scottish Stock Exchange, planned to be established in Edinburgh. The exchange collapsed in 2019 leaving many staff owed unpaid wages.

== History ==
The proposal for a new Scottish Stock Exchange was announced when the founding team reached agreement with Euronext to provide its Optiq trading engine to be the platform for the new market. The founding team noticed that the re-opening of the Scottish Stock Exchange was not one of the recommendations of the Growth Commission, and therefore commissioned its own research, undertaken by Momentous Change Ltd, on the history of the Scottish stock exchanges and the need now for a Scottish Stock Exchange after the result of the United Kingdom's referendum on European Union (EU) membership, in which Scotland, and Edinburgh, voted in favour of remaining within the EU, when the UK as a whole voted to leave.

Project Heather was an Observer member of the Federation of Euro-Asian Stock Exchanges.

The exchange collapsed in 2019 leaving staff unpaid.

== Scottish identity ==
The choice of Scotland for Project Heather was determined by the founding team and reflects the Scottish Government's adoption of a National Performance Framework which incorporates the United Nations' Sustainable Development Goals and its commitment to a Well-being and a net zero carbon economy. Edinburgh is Europe's 4th largest financial centre.

== Impact focused ==
This social stock exchange was to be the first in the world to be built to operate in its own right as a regulated investment exchange - focusing on businesses that make purposefully a measurable positive impact on social and environmental issues - a key pillar of inclusive growth, a key economic basis of the World Bank and the Scottish Government.
