= Air India Flight =

Air India Flight or Air India Crash or variants may refer to:

Air India

- Air India Flight 245, 3 November 1950 crash into Mont Blanc in France
- Air India Flight 101, 24 January 1966 crash into Mont Blanc in France
- Air India Flight 855, 1 January 1978 crash into the Arabian Sea, near India
- Air India Flight 403, 21 June 1982 crash at Bombay, India
- Air India Flight 182, 23 June 1985 mid-air bombing near Ireland, over the Atlantic
- Air India Flight 171, 12 June 2025 crash at Ahmedabad, India

Air India Express

- Air India Express Flight 812, 22 May 2010 crash at Mangalore, India
- Air India Express Flight 1344, 7 August 2020 crash at Kozhikode, India

Indian Airlines

- Indian Airlines Flight 491, 26 April 1993 crash at Aurangabad, India
- Indian Airlines Flight 113, 19 October 1988 crash at Ahmedabad, India
- Indian Airlines Flight 814, 24 December 1999 hijacking

== See also ==
- List of accidents and incidents involving airliners in India
