= Ahmedabad plane crash =

Ahmedabad plane crash may refer to the following aviation incidents or significant flights:

- Indian Airlines Flight 113, crashed while landing, 1988
- Air India Flight 171, crashed just after takeoff, 2025

== See also ==
- List of accidents and incidents involving airliners in India
