= AIB =

AIB or aib may refer to:

== Organisations ==
=== Banking ===
- Afghanistan International Bank
- Allied Irish Banks
  - AIB Group (UK)
  - Allied Irish Bank (GB)
  - AIB (NI)

=== Broadcasting ===
- Association for International Broadcasting
- Atlanta Interfaith Broadcasters

=== Education ===
- ACLEDA Institute of Business
- Aeronautical Institute of Bangladesh
- AIB College of Business
- The Art Institute of Boston
- The Arts Institute at Bournemouth, the former name of The Arts University Bournemouth

=== Military ===
- Allied Intelligence Bureau
- Admiralty Interview Board

=== Professional ===
- Academy of International Business
- American Institute of Baking
- Australian Institute of Building

=== Other ===
- Accident Investigation Board (disambiguation)
- Accident Investigation Bureau (disambiguation)
- Accidents Investigation Branch, the predecessor of the UK's Air Accidents Investigation Branch
- Accountant in Bankruptcy, Scotland
- Anti-inflation Board, Canada
- Association of Issuing Bodies
- American Institute of Bisexuality
- Ação Integralista Brasileira, a Brazilian fascist party during the 1930s

== Science and technology ==
- Add-in board, a printed circuit board that acts as an accessory for another device
- Aluminium-ion battery, a type of rechargeable battery
- Authenticated Identity Body, a mechanism used to verify the identity of the sender of a message
- 2-Aminoisobutyric acid
- 3-Aminoisobutyric acid

== Other uses ==
- All India Bakchod, a Mumbai-based comedy company (2012–2019)
- Arts and Industries Building, a Smithsonian museum in Washington, D.C., US
- Äynu language (ISO 639-3 code: aib)

== See also ==
- Anglo Irish Bank, the Ireland's largest banking insolvency
- Amplified in breast 1, or Nuclear receptor coactivator 3, a protein found in humans
- AAIB (disambiguation)
