= AAIB =

AAIB may refer to:

== Aircraft accident investigation organizations ==
- Air Accident Investigation Bureau (Malaysia), an agency of the Ministry of Transport (Malaysia)
- Air Accident Investigation Bureau (Mongolia), a branch of the government of Mongolia
- Air Accident Investigation Bureau of Singapore, a statutory board of the Ministry of Transport in Singapore
- Air Accidents Investigation Branch, a branch of the Department for Transport in the UK
- Aircraft Accident Investigation Board (Iceland), a branch of the government of Iceland
- Aircraft Accident Investigation Bureau (India), a branch of the government of India
- Aircraft Accident Investigation Bureau (Switzerland), a former branch of the government of Switzerland

== Other meanings ==
- African Alliance Investment Bank

== See also ==
- Aircraft Accident Investigation Bureau (disambiguation)
- Accident Investigation Bureau (disambiguation)
- AIB (disambiguation)
- AAIIB (disambiguation)
