= Aircraft Accident Investigation Bureau =

Aircraft Accident Investigation Bureau may refer to:

- Aircraft Accident Investigation Bureau (India), a branch of the government of India
- Aircraft Accident Investigation Bureau (Republic of the Congo), a branch of the government of the Republic of the Congo
- Aircraft Accident Investigation Bureau (Switzerland), a former branch of the government of Switzerland
- Air Accident Investigation Bureau (disambiguation)
