= Air India Express Flight 812 =

2010 aircraft accident in India

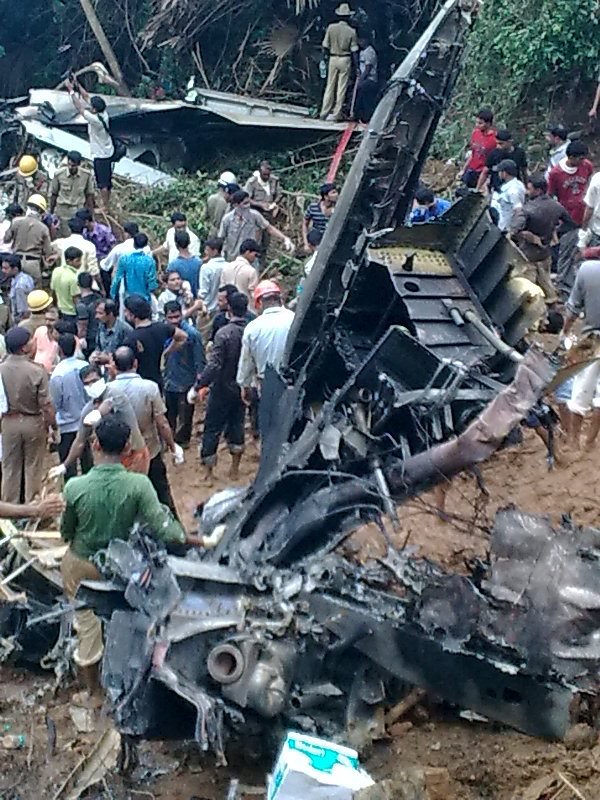
- Wreckage of the aircraft

Accident
- Date: 22 May 2010
- Summary: Runway overrun on landing due to unsafe approach; Pilot Error
- Site: Mangalore International Airport, Mangaluru, India; 12°56′48″N 074°52′25″E

Aircraft
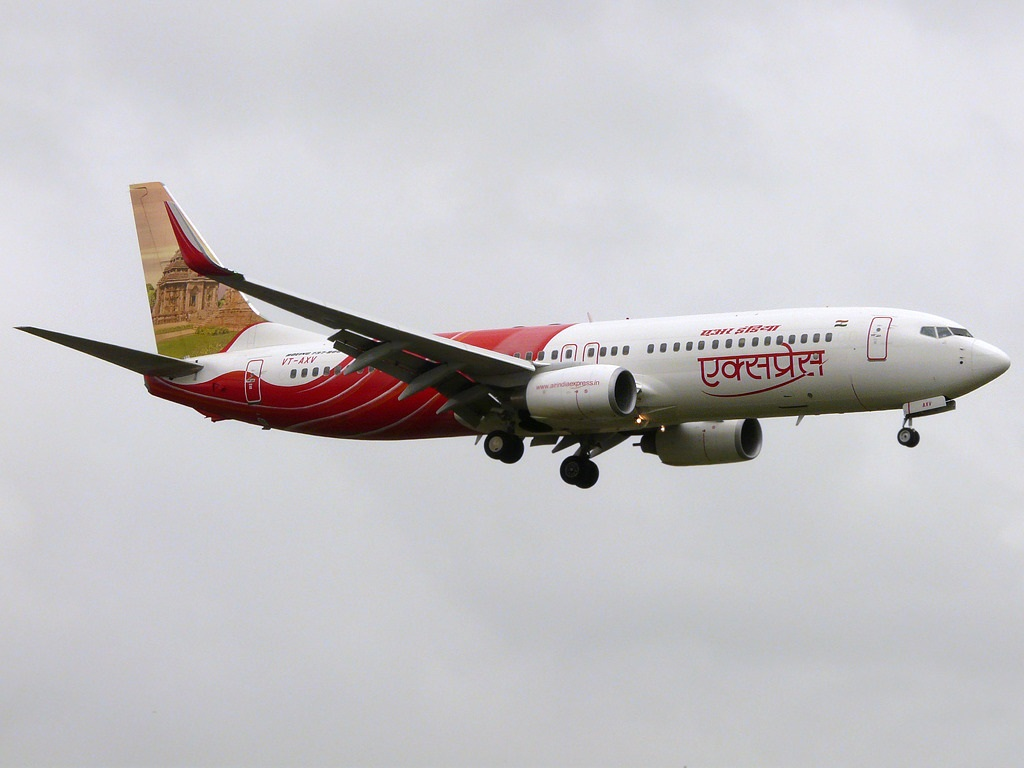
- VT-AXV, the aircraft involved in the accident, seen in 2008
- Aircraft type: Boeing 737-8HG (SFP)
- Operator: Air India Express
- IATA flight No.: IX812
- ICAO flight No.: AXB812
- Call sign: EXPRESS INDIA 812
- Registration: VT-AXV
- Flight origin: Dubai International Airport, Dubai, United Arab Emirates
- Destination: Mangalore International Airport, Mangaluru, India
- Occupants: 166
- Passengers: 160
- Crew: 6
- Fatalities: 158
- Injuries: 8
- Survivors: 8

Air India Express Flight 812 was a scheduled international flight from Dubai International Airport, Dubai, to Mangalore International Airport, Mangaluru. On 22 May 2010, the Boeing 737-800 passenger jet operating the flight crashed on landing at Mangalore. The captain had continued an unstabilised approach, despite three calls from the first officer to initiate a "go-around", resulting in the aircraft overshooting the runway, falling down a hillside, and bursting into flames. Of the 166 passengers and crew on board, 158 were killed (all 6 crew members and 152 passengers); only eight survived. This was the first fatal accident involving Air India Express.

== Background ==
=== Aircraft ===
The accident involved a Boeing 737-8HG(SFP), one of the few 737s with a short-field performance package for landing at airports with short runways, with the aircraft registration VT-AXV and manufacturer's serial number 36333, line number 2481.

=== Crew ===
The crew consisted of Captain Zlatko Glušica, First Officer Harbinder Singh Ahluwalia, and four flight attendants. Glušica, aged 55, was a British and Serbian national with over 10,000 hours of flying and over 7,500 hours of command experience (including 2,440 hours on the Boeing 737), and Ahluwalia, aged 40, was a former employee of Jet Airways who joined Air India Express in 2009, having logged 3,620 flight hours with 3,319 of them on the Boeing 737. Both pilots were based in Mangalore.

== Flight ==
The flight had departed Dubai International Airport at 01:06 GST (21:06 UTC). It crashed upon landing at Mangalore International Airport at 06:05 IST (00:35 UTC). Situated in a hilly area, the airport is one of seven Indian airports designated as a "critical airfield" by the Directorate General of Civil Aviation, whose rules at critical airfields prohibit "supervised takeoffs and landings", i.e., only the captain (not the first officer) may pilot an aircraft during takeoff and landing. Both pilots had previous experience with this airport; Captain Glušica had landed at Mangalore 16 times, while First Officer Ahluwalia had flown to the airport 66 times. The airport is one of three airports in India having table top runways (the others being Kozhikode and Lengpui) that require heightened awareness and a very precise landing approach.

== Accident ==
After touching down on the 8,033-foot (2,448 m) runway 24, the plane overran and crashed down the hill at its far end. The final conversations between Air traffic control (ATC) and the pilot prior to the landing showed initially no indication of distress, but the final report revealed that First Officer Ahluwalia said, "go around captain," unknowingly transmitting this on the ATC frequency.

India's Civil Aviation Minister, Praful Patel, said that the aircraft was following an instrument landing system (ILS) approach for landing on the newer, longer runway, which was commissioned in 2006. The pilot reported to ATC that it was 'established' on an ILS approach about 4.3 miles (6.9 km) from touchdown; landing clearance was then given at 2,000 feet (610 m) from touchdown. The aircraft concluded its ILS approach on runway 24, touching down 5,200 feet (1,600 m) from the start of the runway, leaving 2,800 feet (850 m) in which to stop. It overran the runway and ploughed through a 90-metre (300 ft) sand arrestor bed, which did not stop it. As the aircraft passed the arrestor bed, its starboard wing collided with the concrete socket of the ILS localiser antenna; it finally plunged over the edge of the table-top about 790 feet (240 m) beyond the end of the runway and down the steep hillside, coming to a stop 660 to 980 feet (200 to 300 m) past the top of the slope.

Television footage from shortly after the crash showed the remains of the aircraft on fire and lying on its belly with smoke rising from the wreckage. The minister also stated that weather conditions were normal with a visibility of 3.7 miles (6.0 km), and said wind conditions were calm with no rain at the time of the crash. A drizzle started only after the accident.

With 158 deaths, the crash, at the time, had the highest number of fatalities involving the 737 family, which would later be outnumbered by the crash of Ukraine International Airlines Flight 752, Jeju Air Flight 2216 and Lion Air Flight 610, which killed 176, 179 and 189 people aboard, respectively. The crash of Flight 812 remains the fourth deadliest air disaster in India's history behind Air India Flight 855 on 1 January 1978, Air India Flight 171 on 12 June 2025, and the 1996 Charkhi Dadri mid-air collision.

== Victims ==
In addition to the six crew members, 160 passengers were on board at the time of the crash. Although 169 names were on the original passenger list, nine did not board the flight. All the bodies were recovered from the wreckage. Karnataka Home Minister V. S. Acharya said eight people were initially reported to have survived, although one later died of his injuries—this was, however, refuted by an Air India spokesman, who confirmed that all initial survivors were alive. The confusion arose after firefighters rescued a young girl who died on the way to hospital. The airport manager at Mangalore, Peter Abraham, confirmed that difficulties existed when trying to reach the plane.

Nationality	Fatalities		Survivors		Total
Nationality	Passengers	Crew	Passengers	Crew	Total
Bangladesh	0	0	1	0	1
India	152	5	7	0	164
Serbia	0	1 (Note: The captain had British-Serbian dual citizenship.)	0	0	1
Total	152	6	8	0	166

On 27 July 2010, the names of all the victims were inscribed on a memorial installed near the crash site, which was destroyed by vandals on 5 October 2010.

== Rescue and response ==
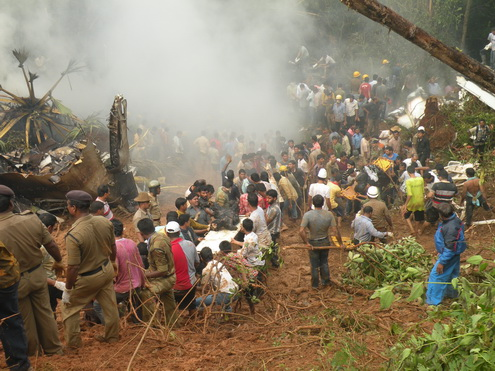
Members of the public services were assisted by local volunteers in a joint rescue operation at the scene of the crash.

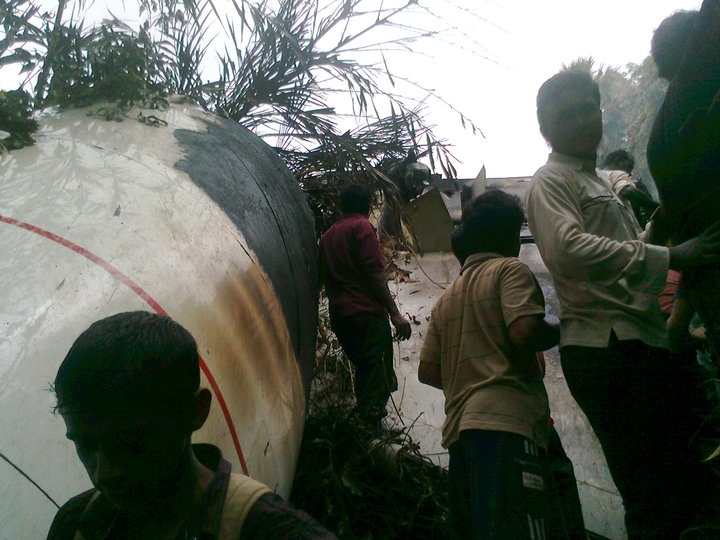
Villagers at the accident site at the wreckage of the plane

"The plane broke in two", said one survivor, "and a dense black smoke invaded the cabin. I jumped out through an opening in the window. Six other passengers followed me. We fled, with the help of the inhabitants of the nearby village". Local villagers were among the first on the scene to help, while an estimated 15 fire trucks, 20 ambulances, and 100 rescue workers were immediately allocated to rescue operations.

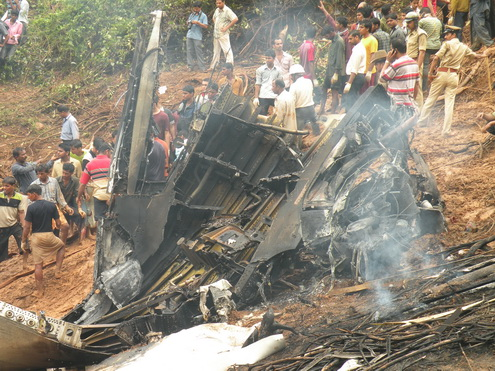
The burnt wreckage of the aircraft

The Karnataka Western Range Inspector General of Police, Gopal Hosur, said that eight to ten people had been moved to hospitals and that the Karnataka Police force, bomb squad, Karnataka Fire and Emergency Services, Karnataka State Reserve Police and all hospitals were working together to help out. The Central Industrial Security Force sent 150 personnel to Mangalore to help in the relief and rescue operations. Bodies of all of the deceased were recovered from the crash site on the day of the crash, with relatives of the deceased receiving 87 of the bodies.

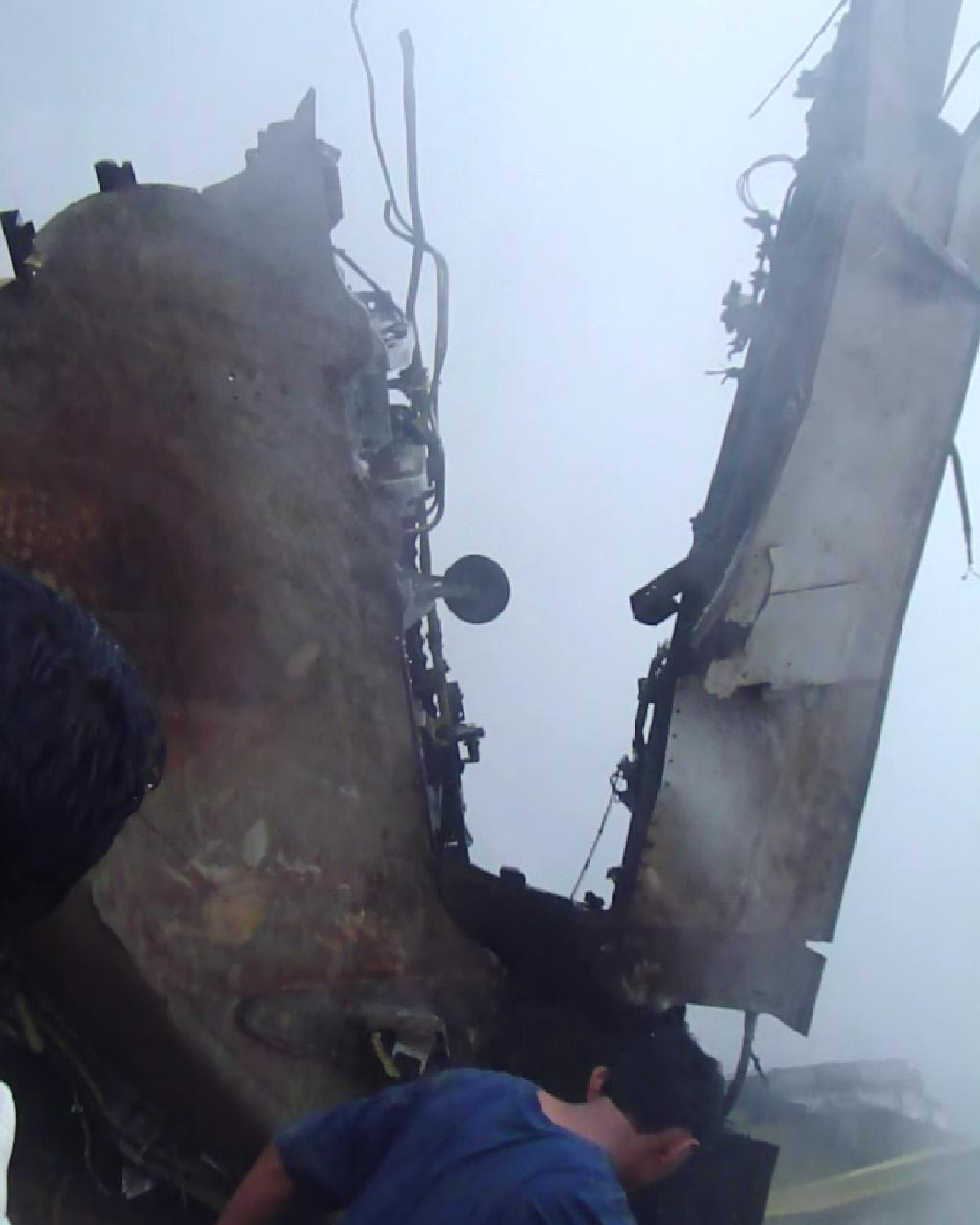
Remains of the burnt plane

After the rapid establishment of a special emergency information service, Praful Patel, the Indian Minister for Civil Aviation, arrived from New Delhi to be at the scene and the one-year-in-office celebrations of the UPA government's second tenure were postponed. Patel was soon followed by Karnataka Chief Minister B. S. Yeddyurappa and Kerala Chief Minister V. S. Achuthanandan to take control of the situation. The chairperson of the governing UPA, Sonia Gandhi, issued a message of grief and wished a "speedy recovery" to all. Patel took moral responsibility for the accident and offered to resign his post, an offer rejected by the Prime Minister of India, Manmohan Singh. Many countries and organisations expressed sorrow and condolences to the people of India over the crash.

The accident was predicted to cost the insurers and their reinsurers ₹350 crore to ₹400 crore (₹3.5 billion to ₹4 billion). Air India's insurer, a consortium led by Reliance General Insurance and comprising Bajaj Allianz, Iffco-Tokio, and HDFC Ergo, paid out US$20 million (about ₹90 crore or ₹900 million) in settlement of the hull loss, and by August 2010, the airline had already received $50 million U.S. dollars (about ₹230 crore or ₹2.3 billion), or 60 per cent of the estimated $70 million (about ₹320 crore or ₹3.2 billion).

== Investigation ==
Initial investigations revealed that the plane landed at least 5,200 feet (1,600 m) beyond the usual touchdown point on Mangalore's new 8,000-foot (2,400 m) runway 24. A team of airline officials, staff and officials from the Airports Authority of India and officers of the Directorate General of Civil Aviation were rushed to the scene to investigate the accident and assist with rescue efforts. Boeing also announced that a team would be sent to provide technical assistance following a request from Indian authorities. The Directorate General of Civil Aviation ordered an inquiry into the crash, which began the same day. The US National Transportation Safety Board (NTSB) also assisted the investigation by sending a team of specialists including a senior air safety investigator, a flight operations specialist, an aircraft systems specialist and technical advisers for Boeing and the Federal Aviation Administration.

Captain Glušica was given clearance to land, but he suddenly aborted the attempted landing. The aircraft's throttle handle was found in the forward position, suggesting that the pilot had attempted to abort the landing and take off again. The co-pilot Ahluwalia had warned his commander three times to go around instead of landing; the first of these warnings had come 2.5 miles (4.0 km) before the runway threshold.

The cockpit voice recorder (CVR) was recovered on 23 May, and the flight data recorder (FDR) two days later. The recorders were sent to New Delhi by the Directorate General of Civil Aviation for data acquisition and analysis and subsequently to the US NTSB for investigation. DGCA official Zaidi claimed "better data protection" while unnamed officials mentioned heavy damage to the devices. In direct response to the accident, the Government of India decided to set up an independent air accident enquiry board called the Civil Aviation Authority (CAA) that would function independently of the DGCA. Effectively this meant that the DGCA would be the regulator and the CAA the investigator. The Director General of the DGCA said that it would be set up thorough legislation, and would comply with the recommendations of the International Civil Aviation Organization.

The enquiry report submitted by the Civil Aviation Ministry said that Glušica slept for over 90 minutes during the flight. According to the NTSB, it was the first instance of snoring recorded on a CVR. Analysis of the accident revealed that had the pilot "deployed detent reverse thrust and applied maximum manual braking at touchdown", the aircraft could have stopped within the paved overrun area of the runway. However, the captain had exacerbated the long landing by attempting a go-around following deployment of the thrust reversers.

== Court of inquiry ==
On 3 June 2010, the government of India appointed the former Vice Chief of Air Staff, Air Marshal Bhushan Nilkanth Gokhale, as head of a court of inquiry to investigate the air crash. The "Gokhale Inquiry" was to investigate the reasons behind the crash and submit its findings by 31 August 2010, a deadline later extended by a month to 30 September 2010. The government also appointed four experts to this court of inquiry to assist in the investigation. The Court of Inquiry started its investigations by visiting the crash site on 7 June 2010, and visited all eight crash survivors to gather information.

On 17 August 2010, the court of inquiry began a three-day public hearing in Mangalore to interview airport officials and witnesses. On day one, airport and airline officials deposed that the aircraft had approached at an altitude higher than usual, and that it had landed beyond the landing zone (LDZ). They also mentioned that the airport's radar was operational from 20 May 2010. The airport chief fire officer testified that crash tenders had taken four minutes to reach the aircraft because the road leading away from the airport perimeter to the crash site was very narrow and undulating. On day two, a transcript of the cockpit to ATC conversation was released, which indicated that the co-pilot had suggested a "go-around" after the pilot informed ATC that it was 'clear to land'.

Doctors who conducted post mortem examinations on the bodies recovered recorded that most victims had died of burns. On day four Air India's flight safety officer informed the inquiry that the aircraft's thrust lever and thrust reverse levers were both in the forward position, possibly indicating that the pilot intended to go around. The inquiry panel stated that information from the FDR would be released at the next hearing of the court of inquiry in New Delhi on 3 September 2010, and that of the CVR soon after. The court of inquiry would submit its report on 30 September 2010.

On 8 September 2010, details from the CVR and FDR were presented to the court of inquiry. The CVR analysis revealed that one of the pilots was asleep in the cockpit. For 110 minutes, the CVR had picked up no conversation from the pilots, with the report adding that the sound of nasal snoring and deep breathing could be heard during this recording. The FDR analysis indicated that the flight started its final descent at an altitude of 4,400 feet (1,300 m), instead of the normal 2,000 feet (610 m). The aircraft also touched down at the 4,638-foot (1,414 m) mark on the runway instead of the 1,000-foot (300 m) mark, whereupon the pilot tried to take off with just 800 feet (240 m) of the runway remaining, which resulted in the crash. Both pilots had been aware of the wrong flight path since they are both heard saying, "Flight is taking wrong path and wrong side", while the aircraft's instruments had given repeated warnings of this.

On 16 November 2010, five months after the court of inquiry was constituted, it submitted its report with input from the NTSB and Boeing, and stated that the cause of this accident was the captain's failure to discontinue the unstabilised approach despite three calls from the first officer to 'go around' and warnings from the enhanced ground proximity warning system. Additional factors included the captain's prolonged sleep during flight, which could have led to sleep inertia and impaired judgment, and the aircraft being given descent clearance closer to the airport than normal due to the unserviceability of the Mangalore Area Control Radar. The flight crew did not plan the descent properly and was high on approach.

As of January 2013, the DGCA, AAI, Ministry of Aviation, and the government of India have not implemented the recommendations of the 812 crash inquiry committee. Work on runway lengthening has not started. The 812 Foundation, a Mangalore-based trust, has filed criminal charges for negligence against regulatory authorities and the airline. The regulatory authority and other organisations named in the petition are thinking of seeking anticipatory bail for their top officials, as the petition seeks nonbailable arrest warrants against those responsible.

== Compensation ==
The Prime Minister of India, Manmohan Singh, announced ₹2 lakh or ₹200,000 (equivalent to ₹490,000 or US$5,200 in 2026) for the families of the dead and ₹50,000 (US$530) for the injured to be allocated from the Prime Minister's National Relief Fund. Karnataka Chief Minister Yeddyurappa had also announced compensation of ₹200,000 (equivalent to ₹490,000 or US$5,200 in 2026) to the families of the dead. In addition to this, the Civil Aviation Ministry advised that the airline will provide up to ₹72 lakh or ₹7.2 million (equivalent to ₹18 million or US$188,300 in 2026) to family members of each victim as per the provisions of the Indian Carriage by Air (Amendment) Act which follows the Montreal Convention.

The airline announced interim compensation of ₹10 lakh or ₹1 million (equivalent to ₹2.4 million or US$26,150 in 2026) for passengers above 12 years of age, ₹5 lakh or ₹500,000 (US$5,300) for passengers below 12 years of age, and ₹2 lakh or ₹200,000 (equivalent to ₹490,000 or US$5,200 in 2026) for every injured passenger. This compensation is over and above the ex-gratia payment announced by the Prime Minister. Additionally, Air India has said it would offer jobs to the survivors. As of 11 June 2010, ₹17 crore or ₹170 million (equivalent to ₹420 million or US$4 million in 2026) had been distributed as compensation to the families of the victims and to the eight survivors. Victims' families have become increasingly vocal as to the inequitable nature of compensation paid out by Air India, and also of the alleged hostile attitude of the airline's counsel.

Members of the Democratic Youth Federation of India along with Kasargod MP P Karunkaran staged a protest on 8 September 2010 at the airline's office in Mangalore, where they submitted a memorandum to officials demanding that families of the victims receive early and equitable settlements of compensation due. They also demanded the settlement process be made more transparent by opening it to the media rather than holding sessions in camera.

On 20 July 2011, based on the petition filed by one of the victims, the Kerala High Court ruled that Air India was liable to pay a no-fault liability of one lakh (100,000) SDR or the Indian rupee equivalent of ₹75 lakh or ₹7.5 million (equivalent to ₹18 million or US$196,140 in 2026). In its ruling, the court noted that India was a signatory to the Montreal Convention: "It is clear that the intention of lawmakers was to bring about a parity in the matter of payment of compensation to the passengers, irrespective of class of travel, while providing for a 'two-tier system' of compensation as adopted in Montreal convention." The court further ruled that this was over and above any other compensation to which the petitioners are entitled. Air India appealed this order in the Kerala High Court, and on 25 August 2011, the division bench stayed the single bench order on compensation of ₹75 lakh or ₹7.5 million (equivalent to ₹18 million or US$196,140 in 2026). However, on 5 September 2011, the Kerala High Court ordered Air India to pay an interim compensation of ₹10 lakh or ₹1 million (equivalent to ₹2.4 million or US$26,150 in 2026).

== Memorial ==
The district administration on 27 May 2010 had buried the remains of 12 unidentified and unclaimed victims at a plot on the banks of the Phalguni river belonging to the NMPT on Tannirbhavi Road, just after the exit of Kulur Bridge. A memorial for the victims of the disaster was built by NMPT and the AAI on this site along with a park, and was opened for the annual memorial service on 22 May 2018 the 8th anniversary of the crash. This memorial replaces the one built soon after the crash near the crash site on 27 July 2010, but demolished by persons unknown a few months later.

The inscription on the memorial reads

ಈ ಸ್ಮಾರಕವನ್ನು ದಿನಾಂಕ 22-05-2010 ರಂದು ಮಂಗಳೂರು ಅಂತಾರಾಷ್ಟ್ರೀಯ ವಿಮಾನ ನಿಲ್ದಾಣದಲ್ಲಿ IX 812 ವಿಮಾನ ಪತನಗೊಂಡು ಮರಣ ಹೊಂದಿದ್ದ ಪ್ರಯಾಣಿಕರು ಹಾಗು ಸಿಬ್ಬಂದಿಯವರ ನೆನಪಿಗಾಗಿ ಹೃತ್ಪೂರ್ವಕವಾಗಿ ಸಮರ್ಪಿಸಲಾಗಿದೆ

in Kannada on the left panel and

This memorial is dedicated in the fond and loving memory of demised passengers and crew of flight IX 812 which crashed at Mangalore International Airport on 22-05-2010

in English on the right panel.

== In popular culture ==
The events of the crash featured in a series two episode of Aircrash Confidential, titled "Pilot Fatigue".

== See also ==
- Air India Express Flight 1344 was another Boeing 737-8NG(SFP) that overshot the runway when landing at Calicut International Airport in 2020.
- Air France Flight 358 was an Airbus A340, which overshot a runway when landing at Toronto Pearson International Airport in 2005.
- American Airlines Flight 1420, a McDonnell Douglas MD-80, overshot the runway during a landing at Little Rock International Airport in 1999.
- Lion Air Flight 583, also an MD-80, overshot the runway during a landing at Adisumarmo International Airport in 2004.
- Indian Airlines Flight 557 overshot runway 27 at the same airport in 1981.
- TAM Airlines Flight 3054, an Airbus A320-233, overshot the runway while landing at Congonhas Airport in 2007; with a total of 199 fatalities, this was the deadliest plane crash in Brazil and the second deadliest crash of an A320 in history.
- XiamenAir Flight 8667, a Boeing 737-800 that overshot the runway during rainy conditions at Ninoy Aquino International in 2018.
- Jeju Air Flight 2216, a Boeing 737-800 that overshot the runway before hitting a berm while the aircraft performed a belly landing at Muan Airport in 2024.
