= Air India Express Flight 1344 =

2020 aviation accident in Kerala, India

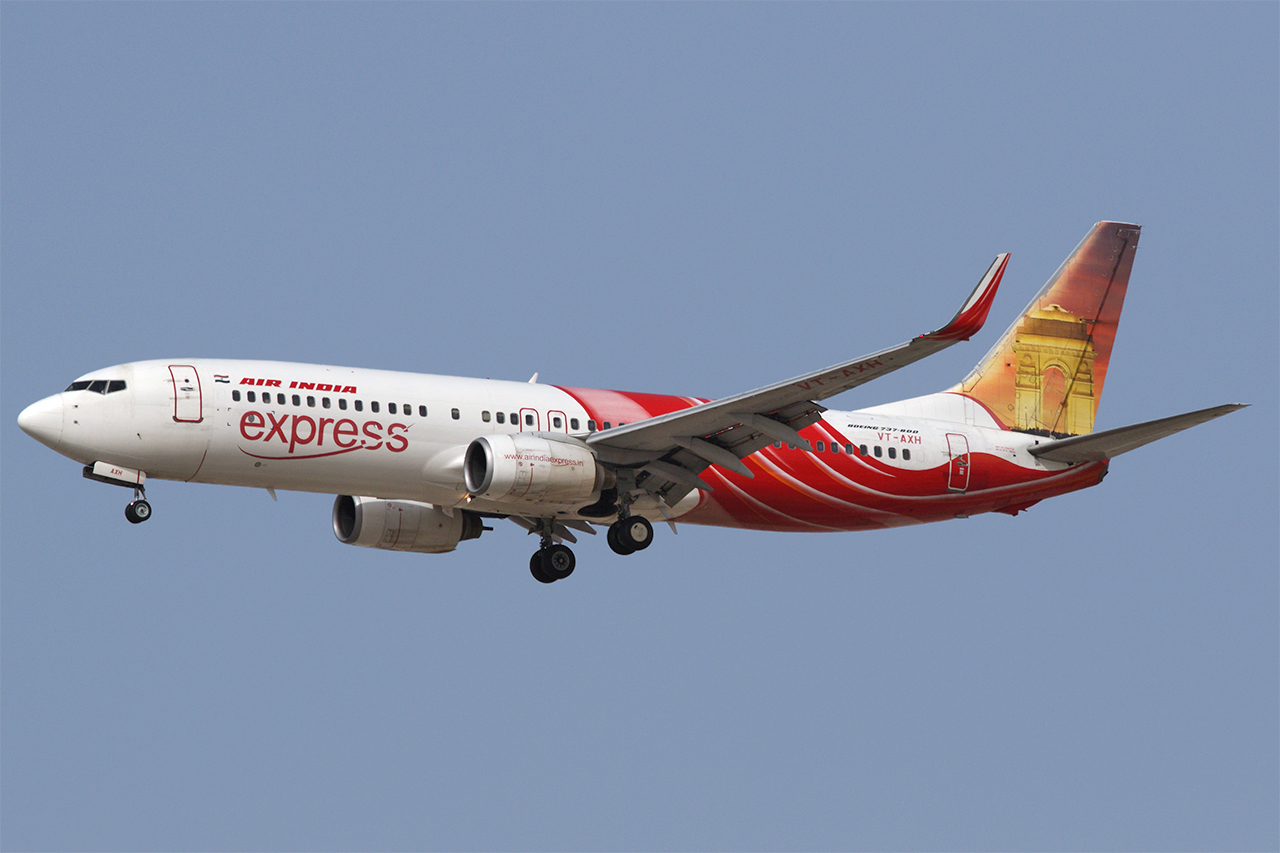
- VT-AXH, the aircraft involved in the accident, pictured in 2018

Accident
- Date: 7 August 2020
- Summary: Runway overrun in poor weather conditions due to pilot error
- Site: Kozhikode International Airport, Kozhikode, Kerala, India; 11°07′59″N 75°58′13″E

Aircraft
- Aircraft type: Boeing 737-8HG(SFP)
- Operator: Air India Express
- IATA flight No.: IX1344
- ICAO flight No.: AXB1344
- Call sign: EXPRESS INDIA 1344
- Registration: VT-AXH
- Flight origin: Dubai International Airport, Dubai, United Arab Emirates
- Destination: Kozhikode International Airport, Calicut, Kerala, India
- Occupants: 190
- Passengers: 184
- Crew: 6
- Fatalities: 21
- Injuries: 110
- Survivors: 169

Air India Express Flight 1344 was a scheduled international flight operated by a Boeing 737-800 on 7 August 2020 from Dubai, United Arab Emirates, to Kozhikode, India, landing at Calicut International Airport. The flight was part of the Vande Bharat Mission to repatriate Indian nationals stranded due to the COVID-19 pandemic. The flight crew aborted two landing attempts because of heavy rain and tailwind. On the third landing attempt, the aircraft touched down on runway 10, but skidded off the end of the tabletop runway and slid down a 9–10.5 m (30–35 ft) slope, killing 19 passengers and both pilots. The 4 cabin crew members and 165 passengers survived, and 110 people were injured. This was the second fatal accident involving Air India Express, after Flight 812 in 2010.

== Background ==
=== Airport ===
Calicut International Airport in Karipur, Malappuram, is considered one of the most dangerous airports in India, according to India's Directorate General of Civil Aviation (DGCA). It has a tabletop runway, that is a runway located on the top of a plateau or hill with one or both ends adjacent to a steep precipice which drops into a gorge. The DGCA designated Calicut Airport as a "critical airfield", which means that only the captain (and not the first officer) can perform takeoffs and landings there. The Airports Authority of India says that the airport is licensed for use in all weather conditions under instrument flight rules, but that the pilots operating night flights to and from Calicut Airport should have sufficient flying hours and previous daytime experience of operating at Calicut.

Captain Mohan Ranganathan, a member of a safety advisory committee of the Ministry of Civil Aviation, said in 2011 that Calicut Airport is "unsafe". He recommended that Calicut Airport not be used for landing during wet weather. He observed that the airport had a tabletop runway with a steep down-slope from one-third of the runway 10 and inadequate "buffer zones", referring to the runway end safety areas (RESA) at both ends of the runway. Instead of the recommended 240 m (790 ft) safety area, it had only 90 m (300 ft). The buffer space on each side of runway 10 is only 75 metres (246 ft) on each side, whereas the recommended width is 100 m (330 ft). Calicut Airport also lacked an engineered materials arrestor system (EMAS), which could have prevented the accident. He also reported that there were heavy rubber deposits on the runway. Calicut Airport's management ignored several warnings about the dangerous conditions at Calicut Airport, especially during wet conditions. Many international airlines stopped landing wide-body aircraft at Calicut because of the dangerous conditions. Ranganathan said "The warnings were ignored... in my opinion, it is not an accident but a murder. Their own audits have had flagged safety issues".

Conditions at Calicut Airport were investigated in 2019, following a tailstrike during the landing of Air India Express aircraft. The investigation revealed several safety hazards, including multiple cracks in the runways, pools of stagnant water, and excessive rubber deposits. In July 2019, the DGCA issued a show-cause notice to the director of Calicut Airport because of these hazards.

=== Aircraft and crew ===
The aircraft involved a Boeing 737-800 with a short-field performance package, registered as VT-AXH, manufacturer's serial number 36323 and line number 2108. The aircraft, that first flew on 15 November 2006, was operated by Air India Express and had a tail livery with India Gate on the left and Gateway of India on the right. The crew consisted of experienced Captain Deepak Sathe (59), first officer Akhilesh Kumar (32); and four flight attendants. Sathe had landed successfully at Calicut airport at least 27 times, including more than 10 times in 2020. He had 10,000 hours of flying experience on the Boeing 737, including 6,662 as commander. He was a former Indian Air Force pilot.

== Accident ==
The aircraft departed stand E6 and took off from runway 30R at Dubai International Airport on 7 August 2020, at 14:14 GST (7 August 2020, 10:14 UTC) and was scheduled to arrive at Calicut International Airport at 19:40 IST (7 August 2020, 14:10 UTC), covering a distance of 2,673 kilometres (1,661 miles). It was a repatriation flight for people who had been stranded abroad due to the COVID-19 pandemic, under the Vande Bharat Mission.

The aircraft reached the airport on schedule. The aircraft made two landing approaches, first on Runway 28 which was aborted due to tailwind and then from the opposite direction on Runway 10. (Note: Runway numbers and letters are determined from the approach direction. It is the whole number nearest to one-tenth of the magnetic azimuth of the centerline of the runway, measured clockwise from the magnetic north. For example: 84° is marked as 8; 85° is marked as 8 or 9; 86° is marked as 9. The opposite end of the runway is then marked with the reciprocal heading which is determined by adding or subtracting 180° from the runway heading. For example: opposite to runway 26 is runway 8 (260° − 180°, i.e., 80°) or opposite to runway 8 is runway 26 (80° + 180°, i.e., 260°). Calicut International Airport have one runway as 28, i.e., runway 280° and the opposite runway is runway 10 (280° − 180° i.e., 100°).) At around 19:37 IST (14:07 UTC), they were given clearance to land on runway 10. Due to the monsoon and floods in Kerala at the time, inclement weather conditions reduced visibility at the time of landing to 2,000 m (6,600 ft). Runway 28 was operational and in the first landing attempt, the pilot could not see the runway thus requested for runway 10. On the second attempt on 2,860 m (9,380 ft) runway 10, the aircraft touched down near taxiway ''C'', which is approximately 1,000 m (3,300 ft) beyond the runway threshold. The aircraft failed to stop before the end of the tabletop runway and plunged 9–10.5 m (30–35 ft) into a gorge, splitting the fuselage into two sections upon impact. The accident site was around 3 km (9,800 ft) from the airport terminal. No post-crash fire was reported. It was suggested that the crew shut off the engines on landing, which may have saved lives by preventing a fire. According to a CISF officer, the aircraft did not slide into the gorge. It took off from the cliff and then collapsed.

The accident was the second fatal accident of Air India Express and was similar to Air India Express Flight 812 which also overran the runway 10 years earlier at Mangalore International Airport, killing 158 people on board.

== Victims ==
A total of 184 passengers, 4 cabin crew and 2 cockpit crew were on board, all Indian. Seventeen people died at the scene of the accident, including both pilots, with four more later dying of their injuries. and more than one hundred people were injured. The chief minister of Maharashtra, Uddhav Thackeray, announced a state funeral for late Wing commander Captain Deepak Vasant Sathe in Mumbai.

List of fatalities
Type of victims	Total on board	Survivors	Fatalities
Passengers	184	165	19
Pilots	2	0	2
Cabin crew	4	4	0
Total	190	169	21

=== Compensation ===
The Government of India announced an interim compensation of ₹10 lakh (equivalent to ₹13 lakh or US$14,000 in 2026) for the families of the deceased above the age of 12 years, ₹5 lakh (equivalent to ₹6.4 lakh or US$6,900 in 2026) for below the age of 12 years, ₹2 lakh (equivalent to ₹2.6 lakh or US$2,700 in 2026) for seriously injured, and ₹50,000 (equivalent to ₹64,000 or US$690 in 2026) for those who sustained minor injuries. It was also announced that the medical expenses of the injured would be borne by the state government. The Government of Kerala announced an additional compensation of ₹10 lakh (equivalent to ₹13 lakh or US$14,000 in 2026) to the next of kin of every person killed in the crash.

Air India Express completed the disbursement of interim compensation to all passengers and next of kin of the deceased passengers soon after the accident. Interim compensation of ₹10 lakh (equivalent to ₹13 lakh or US$14,000 in 2026) was paid to the next of kin of 15 deceased passengers who were above the age of 12, ₹5 lakh (equivalent to ₹6.4 lakh or US$6,900 in 2026) to the next of kin of 4 deceased passengers who were below the age of 12, ₹2 lakh (equivalent to ₹2.6 lakh or US$2,700 in 2026) each to 92 passengers and 2 crew members who were critically injured, and ₹50,000 (equivalent to ₹64,000 or US$690 in 2026) each to 73 passengers who suffered minor injuries.

== Aftermath ==
=== Rescue and response ===
Following the incident, local people from the surrounding Karipur village rushed to the accident site to rescue trapped victims from the aircraft, followed by 40 Central Industrial Security Force (CISF) personnel who were guarding the perimeter of the airport, a quick reaction team and the Chief Airport Security Officer. Family members of the CISF personnel living nearby also joined. Police and firefighters were also deployed for the initial rescue operations. All passengers were evacuated in about three hours and taken to various hospitals in Kozhikode and Malappuram districts. Emergency response team, GO Team (Note: To respond to an aviation incident, the airline would "activate GO team." The duty manager at the flight operations centre would deploy an extra 15 to 20 people to travel to the airport where the incident occurred, or, if the incident were airborne, to the airport receiving the plane.) and special assistance team of Air India (officially known as 'Angels of Air India') from Kochi, Mumbai and Delhi were sent to the accident site. Three CISF officers were awarded Director General commendation disc for their rescue efforts after the mishap. The accident is predicted to cost the insurers and their reinsurers ₹375 crore (equivalent to ₹482 crore or US$51 million in 2026), which includes aircraft or hull and liability for third party and passengers. It is around 90 per cent of the insured value and Air India will recover this amount since the aircraft has been totally damaged. The insurer is an Indian insurance consortium led by New India Assurance. Claim settlement survey has already started. The airline had engaged a US-based firm, Kenyon International, to recover the baggage along with Angels of Air India.

=== COVID-19 infection ===
Two passengers on the flight who survived tested positive for COVID-19, after arriving at a hospital after the accident. To check the spread among other passengers and rescue personnel, CISF and Kerala Health Department asked their personnel and other passengers who were on the flight to undertake testing and quarantine. One week later, 24 officers involved in the rescue operation tested positive. Kondotty municipality, the place where the airport is located, was subsequently declared as a containment zone.

=== Pilots associations' response ===
The International Federation of Air Line Pilots' Associations (IFALPA) tightly monitored the actions after the accident and responded "Our thoughts are with the families of the pilots, crew members, and passengers who lost their lives aboard the aircraft. We send support and wishes to all the survivors, many of them injured and in hospital in critical condition." They got in touch with the Indian association, Air Line Pilots’ Association-India (ALPA-India) and the Aircraft Accident Investigation Bureau (AAIB) for technical expertise and assistance in investigation.

Following the accident, many pilot associations in the country soared up against the director of the DGCA, Arun Kumar, and wanted him to be replaced with someone more technically sound in aviation, after he referred to the late pilots as "fellows" and also said, "...and the landing it seems was not appropriate...", "The landing was not smooth". The pilot associations said that these comments from the director were amateurish and made them "the laughing stock of the aviation world".

=== Public interest litigation ===
According to Yeshwant Shenoy, a lawyer fighting for safer airports in India, the DGCA should have put restrictions on conditions when airlines could land or take off. He blamed the DGCA for being incompetent and negligent after the 2010 crash in Mangalore, and called it a state-run syndicate. He filed a Public Interest Litigation (PIL) in the Kerala High Court after the accident, to shut down operations of Calicut airport as it is not compliant with air regulations. Shenoy demanded an open inquiry by a Court of Inquiry instead of a closed one by AAIB. He also demanded that the investigation should be conducted by the Central Bureau of Investigation, as local police weren't experienced in these.

=== Ban on wide-body aircraft ===
Shortly after the accident, operations of wide-body aircraft at Kozhikode were put on hold. As a result, Air India and Saudia removed their widebody services to Kozhikode.

== Investigation ==
The Directorate General of Civil Aviation (DGCA) and Flight Safety Departments investigated the accident. The cockpit voice recorder and flight data recorder were recovered the next day and sent to Delhi for analysis. Boeing was to send its investigation team to examine the debris of the aircraft for defects and assist the probe.

Initial findings suggested that at the time of landing, the tailwind was around 9 knots (17 km/h). The aircraft was at 176 knots (326 km/h) at an altitude of approximately 450 feet (140 m) above the surface of runway 10, which is not considered ideal for short finals during poor weather conditions. The throttle was found to be in a fully forward position (takeoff or go-around position) and the spoilers were retracted from the position of the speed brake lever, which indicates that the pilots might have tried for a go-around. The tailwind, rubber deposits and wet runway affecting the braking performance of the aircraft are thought to be contributory factors to the accident. Civil Aviation Minister, Hardeep Puri, in a press conference at Kozhikode on 8 August, said that there had been sufficient fuel onboard for the aircraft to have flown to a diversion airport. The possibility of pilot error as a cause of the accident was suggested by DGCA's Arun Kumar.

Several concerns were raised on the inquiry on this incident, by Captain Mohan Ranganathan, Yeshwant Shenoy and others, that it might get covered up and the truth would never surface. Royal Aeronautical Society fellow and aviation safety expert Amit Singh alleged that evidence in the accident site was being tampered, as few unidentified people were spotted near the wreckage, thus asked for an open investigation. He also pointed out that investigations were flawed and instead of punishing real culprits, the pilots were blamed.

=== Aircraft Accident Investigation Bureau (AAIB) ===
The AAIB team in Kozhikode probed the incident with the assistance of Airports Authority of India officials, air traffic control, ground staff, CISF, the fire team and the rescue team. It found evidence of waterlogging of the runway at the time of landing. It also checked whether ATC was aware of waterlogging and whether the pilots adhered to rules. The preliminary investigation report was expected to be ready in a week after the accident, however this did not happen.

The United States National Transportation Safety Board (NTSB) also sent a member to assist the AAIB.

A five-member committee was set up by AAIB on 13 August, to investigate the incident, with the final report to be submitted on 13 January 2021. The committee headed by Captain S.S. Chahar, former designated examiner on Boeing 737 Next Generation, was to also provide recommendations to avoid such accidents in future.

The civil aviation ministry cited delays due to the COVID-19 pandemic and granted a two-month extension to the AAIB to submit its draft final probe report on the accident.

=== Final report ===
On 11 September 2021 the final report was released by the Indian Aircraft Accident Investigation Bureau (AAIB). The final report stated that the probable cause was "non adherence to SOP by the PF, wherein, he continued an unstabilised approach and landed beyond the touchdown zone, half-way down the runway". The probable cause was also partially attributed to the First Officer for failing to take control and execute a go-around himself when the Captain failed to do so.

The report and subsequent analyses also highlighted weather and runway conditions as contributing factors. The aircraft landed during heavy monsoon rain on a wet runway, with a tailwind component, which reduced braking effectiveness and increased the likelihood of an overrun. Furthermore, Kozhikode Airport’s tabletop runway, with limited runway end safety areas and no engineered arresting system (EMAS), offered little margin for error, making overruns particularly hazardous. While these factors did not directly cause the accident, they were recognized as exacerbating the severity of the crash.

== In popular culture ==
Vande Bharat Flight IX 1344: Hope to Survival is a 2021 Discovery+ original documentary based on the accident. The 45-minute documentary creates graphical simulations of the accident.

The crash is featured on the 9th episode of the 26th season of the Canadian documentary series Mayday titled "Monsoon Approach".

== See also ==
- List of accidents and incidents involving commercial aircraft
- List of accidents and incidents involving the Boeing 737
- Pegasus Airlines Flight 2193 a Boeing 737-86J, (Note: The last two alphanumeric characters of a Boeing aircraft indicate the Boeing customer code. A "Boeing 737-86J" is a Boeing 737-800 produced by Boeing for Air Berlin (the customer assigned customer code 6J by Boeing). Aircraft customer codes are based on the customer ordering the aircraft, and do not change if the aircraft is sold. See list of Boeing customer codes for more information.) which overran the runway at Istanbul Sabiha Gökçen International Airport, Pendik, Istanbul, Turkey. Three died.
- TAM Airlines Flight 3054 an Airbus A320, which overshot the runway at Congonhas Airport, situated in Brazil
- Air France Flight 358 an Airbus A340, which overran the runway at Toronto Pearson International Airport in August, 2005
- TACA Flight 390
