= Tabletop runway =

Runway on hill with steep edges

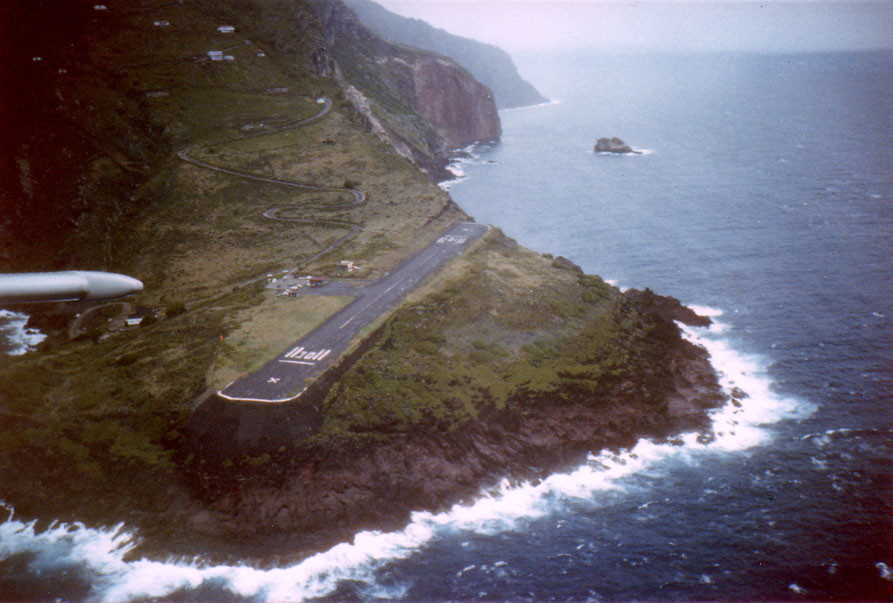
Juancho E. Yrausquin Airport in Saba, an example of a tabletop runway.

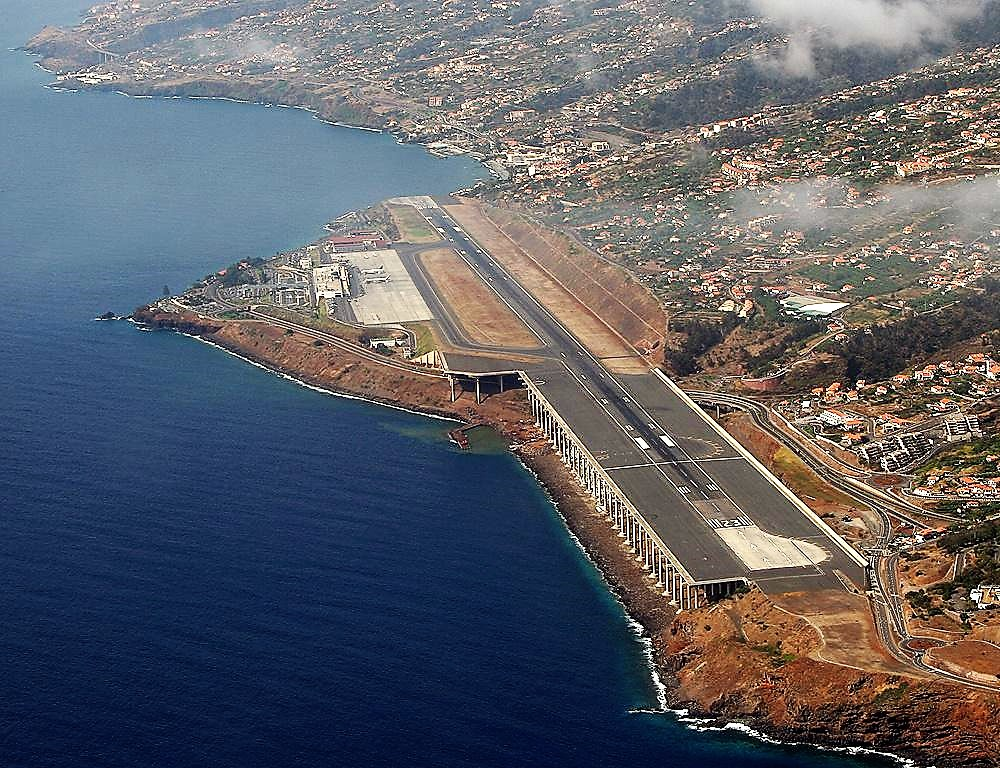
Cristiano Ronaldo International Airport in Madeira.

A tabletop runway is a runway that is located on the top of a plateau or hill with one or both ends adjacent to a steep precipice which drops into a deep gorge. This type of runway creates an optical illusion of being at the same level as the plains below, which requires a very precise visual approach by the pilot when instrument landing is not used or not available.

== List of tabletop runways ==
Country	Location	Airport	Airport codes		Ref.
Country	Location	Airport	IATA	ICAO	Ref.
Brazil	São Paulo	Congonhas Airport	CGH	SBSP	
Colombia	Bucaramanga	Palonegro International Airport	BGA	SKBG	
Colombia	Pasto	Antonio Nariño Airport	PSO	SKPS	
Colombia	Pereira	Matecaña International Airport	PEI	SKPE	
Faroe Islands	Sørvágur	Vágar Airport	FAE	EKVG	
France	Courchevel	Courchevel Airport	CVF	LFLJ	
India	Himachal Pradesh	Shimla Airport	SLV	VISM	
India	Kerala	Calicut International Airport	CCJ	VOCL	
India	Karnataka	Mangalore International Airport	IXE	VOML	
India	Kerala	Kannur International Airport	CNN	VOKN	
India	Maharashtra	Baramati Airport	-	-	
India	Mizoram	Lengpui Airport	AJL	VELP	
India	Sikkim	Pakyong Airport	PYG	VEPY	
Italy	Lampedusa	Lampedusa Airport	LMP	LICD	
Nepal	Dolpa	Dolpa Airport	DOP	VNDP	
Nepal	Khotang	Manmaya Rai Airport	?	VKND	
Nepal	Okhaldhunga	Rumjatar Airport	RUM	VNRT	
Nepal	Mugu	Talcha Airport	?	VNRR	
Nepal	Solukhumbu	Tenzing–Hillary Airport	LUA	VNLK	
Nepal	Kathmandu	Tribhuvan International Airport	KTM	VNKT	
Nepal	Sankhuwasabha	Tumlingtar Airport	TMI	VNTR	
Netherlands	Saba	Juancho E. Yrausquin Airport	SAB	TNCS	
Norway	Tromsø	Tromsø Airport	TOS	ENTC	
Philippines	Baguio	Loakan Airport	BAG	RPUB	
Portugal	Santa Cruz	Cristiano Ronaldo International Airport	FNC	LPMA	
Saint Helena	Longwood	Saint Helena Airport	HLE	FHSH	
Spain	Playa Santiago	La Gomera Airport	GMZ	GCGM	
Spain	Montferrer i Castellbò	Andorra-La Seu d'Urgell Airport	LEU	LESU	
United States	California	Catalina Airport	AVX	KAVX	
United States	California	Monterey Airport	MRY	KMRY	
United States	California	McClellan Palomar Airport	CLD	KCRQ	
United States	California	San Nicolas Island NOLF	?	KNSI	
United States	Arizona	Sedona Airport	SDX	KSEZ	
United States	West Virginia	Yeager Airport	CRW	KCRW	
United States	Colorado	Telluride Airport	TEX	KTEX	

== Selected accidents and incidents ==
- On 19 November 1977, TAP Air Portugal Flight 425, a Boeing 727-200, landed long over the runway in Madeira Airport, plunged over a steep bank and then crashed hard onto a beach, killing 131 of 164 people on board. In response, the runway was dramatically extended and got several upgrades in the following decades.
- The configuration of Mangalore Airport has been cited as a factor in the Air India Express Flight 812 crash on 22 May 2010. The Boeing 737-800 operated by Air India Express overshot the runway threshold touchdown area, failed to stop, went out of control, and rolled down a steep hillside, killing 158 of 166 people on board.
- On 25 May 2011, an Embraer Phenom 100, N224MD, operated by JetSuite overran the runway during landing at the Sedona Airport. The pilots approached with an excessive airspeed, which resulted in a failure to stop the airplane before overrunning the runway. The airplane came to the rest upright on an approximately 40-degree incline at approximately 117.6 metres (386 ft) below the departure end of runway 21. The first officer and one passenger suffered serious injuries.
- On 27 May 2017, Summit Air Flight 409 stalled on final approach to Tenzing–Hillary Airport, subsequently crashing 120 metres (400 ft) below the threshold of runway 06. The cargo flight descended too low on approach, upon which pilots suddenly increased the angle of attack at the low speed. The aircraft stalled as a result of excessive drag and impacted the sloping terrain 40 metres (130 ft) short of the runway.
- On 7 August 2020, an Air India Express Flight 1344, a Boeing 737-800 (as part of Vande Bharat Mission) skidded off the tabletop runway at Calicut International Airport in Kerala, killing 21 of the 190 people on board, including the captain and co-pilot.
- On 28 January 2026, at around 9:12 a.m., a business jet carrying the deputy chief minister of Maharashtra, Ajit Pawar, crashed and exploded on its second landing attempt at Baramati Airport, killing him and four others. The aircraft involved was VT-SSK, a Learjet 45XR operated by VSR Aviation.

== See also ==
- Index of aviation articles
