= Indian Airlines Flight 113 =

1988 aviation accident in India

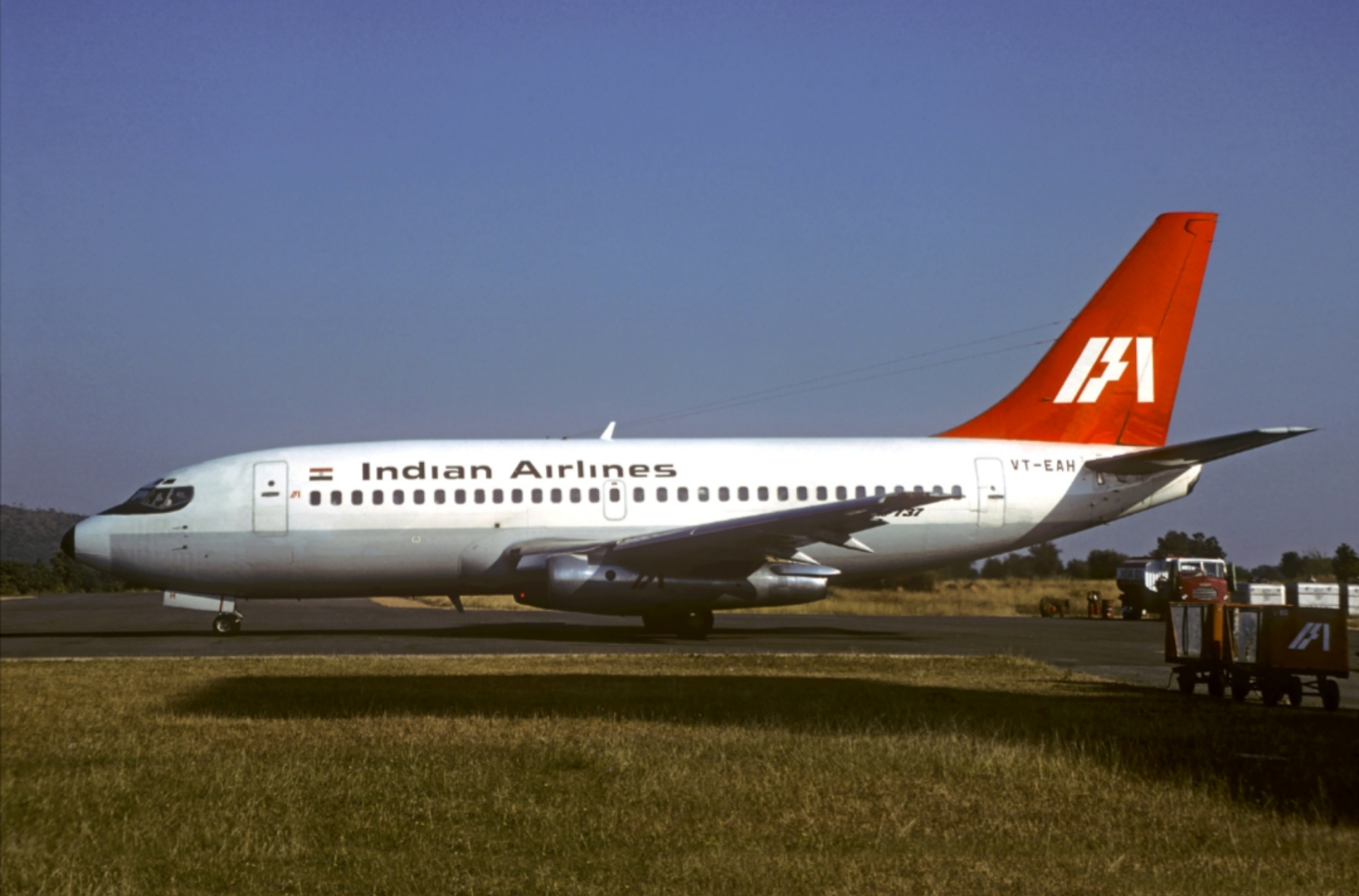
- VT-EAH, the aircraft involved in the accident, pictured in 1978

Accident
- Date: 19 October 1988
- Summary: Controlled flight into terrain due to pilot error and ATC error under poor visibility
- Site: Near Sardar Vallabhbhai Patel International Airport, Ahmedabad, Gujarat, India; 23°05′29″N 72°39′09″E

Aircraft
- Aircraft type: Boeing 737-2A8
- Operator: Indian Airlines
- IATA flight No.: IC113
- ICAO flight No.: IAC113
- Call sign: INDAIR 113
- Registration: VT-EAH
- Flight origin: Chhatrapati Shivaji Maharaj International Airport, Mumbai, Maharashtra, India
- Destination: Sardar Vallabhbhai Patel International Airport, Ahmedabad, Gujarat, India
- Occupants: 135
- Passengers: 129
- Crew: 6
- Fatalities: 133
- Injuries: 2
- Survivors: 2

Indian Airlines Flight 113 was a domestic passenger flight operated by a Boeing 737-200 from Mumbai to Ahmedabad that crashed on its final approach to Ahmedabad Airport on 19 October 1988, killing 133 of the 135 people on board.

The crash was the deadliest crash in the history of Indian Airlines. It is now the fifth-deadliest civil aviation accident in India after the 1996 Charkhi Dadri mid-air collision, Air India Flight 171 (2025), Air India Flight 855 (1978), and Air India Express Flight 812 (2010).

== Aircraft and crew ==
The aircraft was a Boeing 737-2A8, registered VT-EAH, delivered new to Indian Airlines in December 1970, and had accumulated 42,831 hours and 47,647 landings.

The flight crew consisted of captain O.M. Dallaya and first officer Deepak Nagpal.

== Accident ==
The flight was scheduled to depart at 0545 IST but was delayed 20 minutes due to one no-show passenger. The aircraft departed Bombay at 0605, and at 0620 the crew contacted Ahmedabad Approach Control. The METAR of 0540 was then transmitted to the crew, and again at 0625 the weather of 0610, due to visibility reducing from 6 to 3 kilometres (3.7 to 1.9 mi). Clearance to descend to FL 150 (approximately 15,000 feet (4,600 m)) was given at 0632 IST and the crew was advised to report when the aircraft was at 1,700 feet (520 m) overhead the Ahmedabad VHF omnidirectional range (VOR). Visibility was 2,000 metres (2.0 km; 1.2 mi) in haze and the QNH was 1010. The QNH was correctly read back by the crew.

The pilot decided to carry out a localiser-DME approach for runway 23 and reported overhead of Ahmedabad at 0647 IST. The aircraft went outbound and reported turning inbound at 0650 IST. This was the last transmission from the aircraft to ATC.

The flight crew did not seek any permission or clearance for landing, nor did they give standard call-outs after 1,000 feet (300 m). The aircraft's speed was 160 knots (300 km/h; 180 mph), which was more than the prescribed speed, and the pilot should not have descended below 500 feet (150 m) (Minimum Descent Altitude) unless he had sighted the runway. The cockpit voice recorder conversation between the pilot and the co-pilot showed that both were focused on trying to see the runway and they had decided to attempt such a landing and in their anxiety to see the field, they lost track of their altitude. Instead of the pilot-in-command concentrating on the instruments, both pilots were trying to sight the runway without paying necessary attention to the altimeter.

AT 0653 IST the aircraft struck trees and a high-tension electricity transmission pylon and went down on the outskirts of Chiloda Kotarpur village, near the Noble Nagar Housing Society near Ahmedabad. The crash site was 2,540 metres (2.54 km; 1.58 mi) from the approach end of runway 23.

Several NOTAMs had been issued for Ahmedabad airport, specifically for the absence of approach lights; and for the glide path being absent from the Instrument Landing System, leaving only the localiser available. This still left VASI lights, VOR, DME, and localiser, which was sufficient to land aircraft even with visibility at 1,600 metres (1.6 km; 0.99 mi). The Airport Authority said it was a mandatory requirement that the pilot be able to see the runway from 500 feet and that if the pilot had not seen the runway, he should have never descended below 500 feet, and if the runway was visible, he should have been able to land. The fact that the aircraft crashed 2.6 kilometres (1.6 mi) from the airport showed that he had not sighted the runway.

The Airport Authority also stated that the VOR had to have been operational at the time, because the pilot was able to make inbound and outbound turns using the VOR as a reference. The localiser also had to have been operational and used by the pilots, because the aircraft had crashed on the extended centerline of the runway. Data collected from the aircraft's flight recorders shows the pilots did not make sure of the airport's DME and VASI lights, and since their altimeters were working correctly, ignored or did not maintain awareness of the aircraft's altitude.

It was also determined that the airport personnel did not make Runway Visual Range measurements in the declining visibility situation, as was their duty and fully within their capability, and therefore did not render RVR reports to the pilots.

== Victims ==
The flight carried 129 passengers (124 adults and 5 children) and 6 crew (pilot, co-pilot, and 4 cabin crew). All 6 crew members were killed in the crash. Professor Labdhi Bhandari from Indian Institute of Management, Ahmedabad was one of the prominent victims of the crash.

Five passengers initially survived the crash and were transported to hospital, but they succumbed to their injuries.

== Investigation ==
The Court of Inquiry arrived at the following conclusion

- The cause of the accident is error of judgment on the part of the Pilot-in-command as well as the Co-pilot associated with poor visibility which was not passed to aircraft.

After receiving the report, the Government of India appointed a committee to evaluate the report with the United States National Transportation Safety Board. The Government of India then accepted the report and made the following modification;

- The cause of the accident is error of judgment on the part of the Pilot-in-command as well as the Co-pilot due to non-adherence to laid down procedures, under poor visibility conditions.

== Compensation ==
In 1989, Indian Airlines had initially offered to pay ₹ 200,000 as full and final settlement to the relatives of each of the victims, the maximum amount allowed under Rules 17 and 22 of the Second Schedule to the Carriage by Air Act 1972. To receive a higher payout, the plaintiffs would have to prove under Rule 25 of said schedule that the damage resulted from an act or omission of the airline done recklessly and with knowledge that damage would probably result, so as to render the limit of liability (₹ 200,000) inapplicable.

The compensation award was successfully challenged in the Ahmedabad City Civil court on 14 October 2009 and higher amounts were awarded by the court on a case-by-case basis, including factors such as age of the deceased, income, occupation, future prospects and life expectancy. A bench comprising Justices M S Shah and H N Devani passed the order and directed Indian Airlines and the Airport Authority of India (AAI) to pay the compensation to the petitioners by 31 December 2009. Indian Airlines was to pay 70 percent of the compensation and AAI the remaining 30 percent. The compensation amount was to be paid along with an interest of nine percent per annum calculated from 1989 when the petitioners had approached the lower court.

The final High Court ruling was thus;

We are, therefore, of the view that for the accident in question i.e. the crashing of the Indian Airlines corporation aircraft Boeing 737 Aircraft VT-EAH on its daily scheduled flight IC 113 from Bombay to Ahmedabad at 0653 IST in the morning of 19 October 1988 at a distance of 2540 metres from the beginning of runway 23 at the Ahmedabad Airport in poor visibility conditions, the major share goes to the pilot-in-command and the co-pilot of the Indian Airlines. They acted recklessly with knowledge about probable damage about the consequence of their acts and omissions. We are also of the view that there was some negligence on the part of the Airport Authority of Ahmedabad in not providing the latest visibility report to the aircraft by getting the RVR from the Meteorological office at the airport (paras 53 to 57 herein-above). The degree of negligence on the part of the pilot-in-command and the co-pilot of the Indian Airlines was so high that the same amounted to recklessness on their part as contemplated by Rule 25 to the Second Schedule to the Carriage by Air Act, 1972. The accident in question was because of recklessness on the part of the Indian Airlines and their servants, particularly the pilot-in-command as well as the co-pilot, with knowledge of the probable consequences of attempting to land without any clearance from the Air Traffic Control, Ahmedabad, without having cared to spot the VASI lights and without having cared to take note of NOTAMS sent by the Airport Authority of India, Ahmedabad about availability of VASI lights and non-availability of Instrument Landing System and non-operational approach lights.

— Ahmedabad City Civil court

== See also ==
- List of accidents and incidents involving commercial aircraft
- List of accidents and incidents involving airliners in India
- Air India Flight 171 - another aircraft which crashed at Ahmedabad in 2025
