= Calicut International Airport =

Airport serving City of Kozhikode, Kerala, India

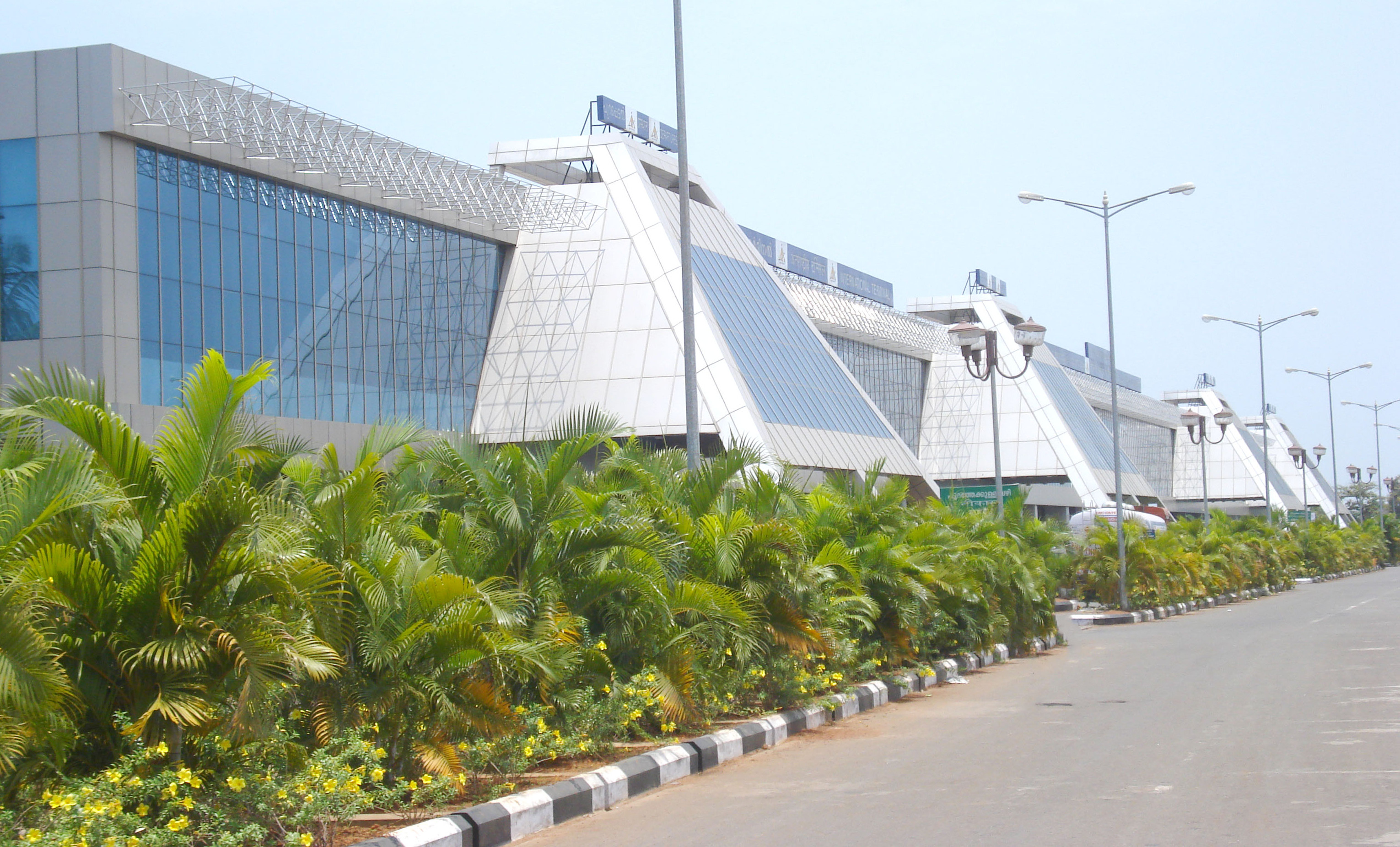
- IATA: CCJ; ICAO: VOCL

Summary
- Airport type: Public
- Owner/Operator: Airports Authority of India
- Serves: Kozhikode
- Location: Karipur, Kondotty, Malappuram district, Kerala, India
- Opened: 13 April 1988; 38 years ago
- Operating base for: Air India Express
- Elevation AMSL: 104 m (341 ft)
- Coordinates: 11°08′10″N 75°57′18″E
- Website: www.aai.aero/en/airports/calicut

Map
- Location within Kerala Location within India

Runways
Direction	Length		Surface
Direction	m	ft	Surface
10/28	2,860	9,383	Asphalt

Statistics (April 2025 - March 2026)
- Passengers: 38,55,618 (▲4.3%)
- Aircraft movements: 25,699 (▼2.6%)
- Cargo tonnage: 17,791.3 (▼16.3%)
- Source: AAI

Calicut International Airport (IATA: CCJ, ICAO: VOCL), locally referred to as Karipur Airport, is an international airport serving the city of Kozhikode in the state of Kerala, India. It is situated at Karippur, Malappuram 28 km (17 mi) away from Kozhikode city. The airport opened on 13 April 1988, serves as an operating base for Air India Express. It is tied with Hyderabad in terms of international traffic. It received the international airport status on 2 February 2006. It is one of the few airports in the country with a tabletop runway.

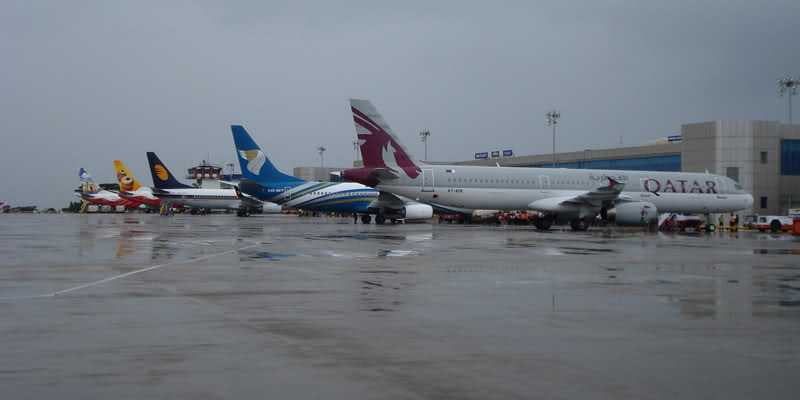
Apron area of the airport

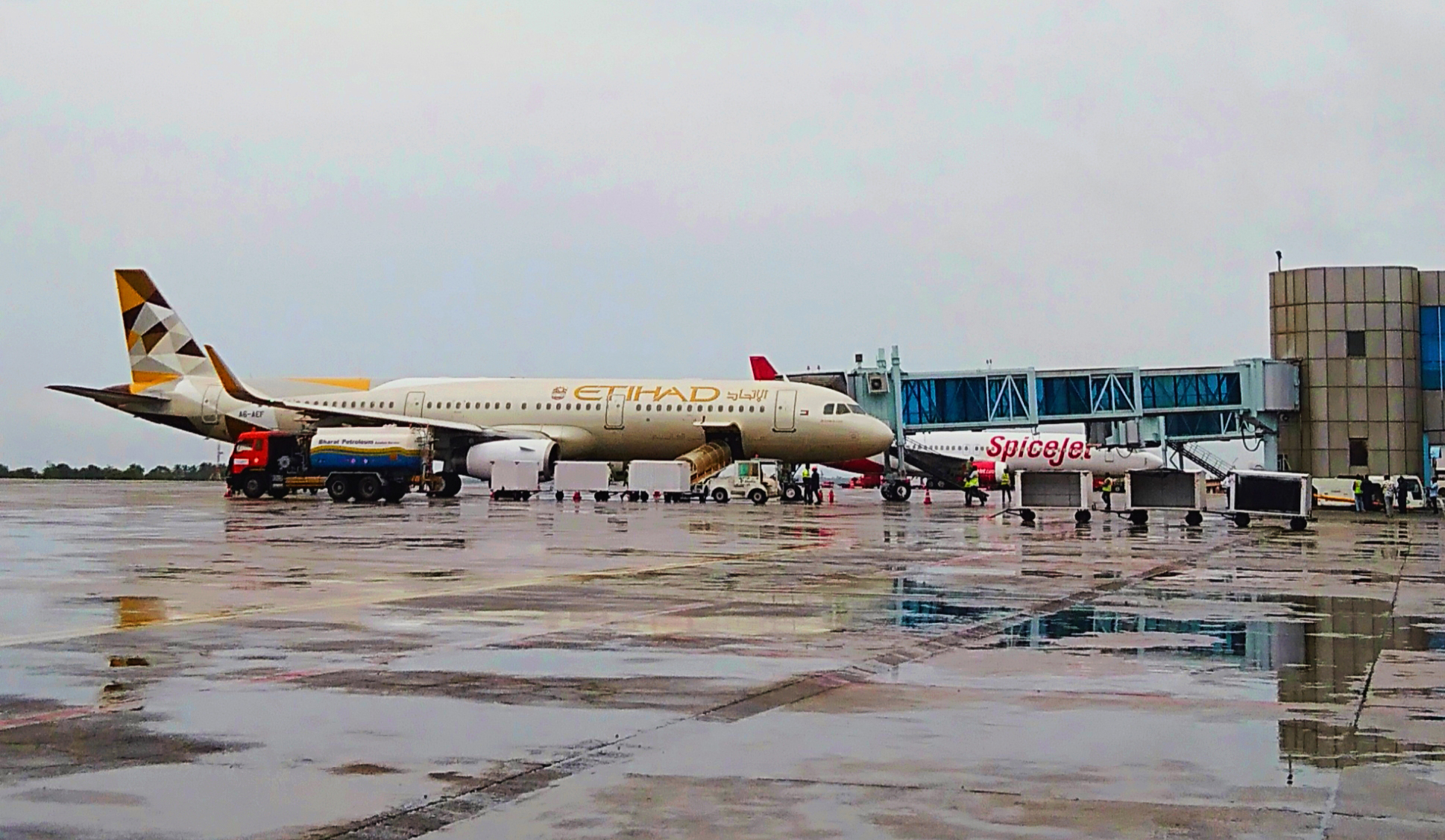
Etihad Airways Airbus A321 at Calicut International Airport in 2021

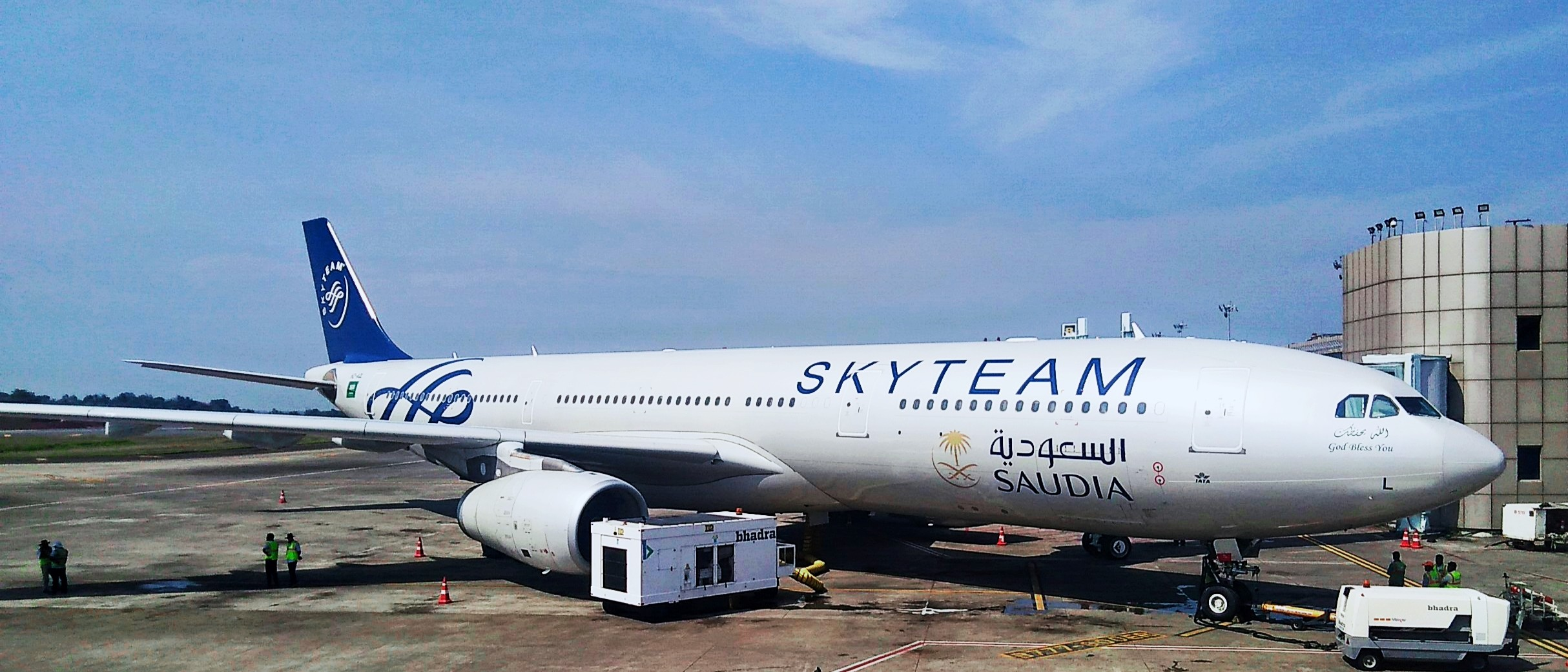
Saudia Airbus A330 at Calicut International Airport in 2021

== History ==
=== Early years ===
The airport was inaugurated on 13 April 1988. In 1977, the airport was sanctioned due to long periods of struggle under the leadership of the late freedom fighter, K. P. Kesava Menon. In the 1990s, Gulf Malayalis played an important role in the development of the airport - they collected funds for the purpose when the Union Government claimed it did not have any. This led to the inception of the Malabar International Airport Development Society, which helped raise funds for the airport's development. Consequently, major developments of facilities, such as an extension of the runway from 6,000 feet to 9,000 feet to facilitate the operation of large aircraft, were carried out with loans from the Housing and Urban Development Corporation (HUDCO). It received the status of an international airport on 2 February 2006, which led to more development in its infrastructure, for handling the operation of international flights from its terminal.

=== Wide-body aircraft restrictions ===
Since 1 May 2015, the Airports Authority of India (AAI) imposed restrictions on the operation of wide-body aircraft such as Boeing 777 and 747 for a period of six months for runway recarpeting, which had been long overdue at this airport. As a result, Emirates, Saudia and two Air India Boeing 747 flight operations had to move temporarily to Cochin International Airport during this time. The airport authorities had expressed doubt about getting permission to operate wide-bodied aircraft from the airport, even after the completion of the recarpeting, for the runway in the airport is not large enough for the operation of jumbo aircraft. AAI had earlier instructed that all airports using widebody aircraft must have 240 m of Runway End Safety Area (RESA) in each direction, whereas that of Calicut Airport must have 90 m. The airport director K Janardhanan said the short runway was a major hurdle in operating wide-bodied aircraft from the tabletop runway and the runway length should be extended from the current 2,850 m to 3,150 m to operate wide-bodied aircraft, he added. The major hurdle in extending the runway is the delay in acquiring the land which requires a total of 156 hectares (385 acres) of land for extending the runway and associated facilities. The state government has been finding the task difficult, for it requires relocation of 1,500 families living around the airport. As of 10 June 2016, not much action has been taken for land acquisition to help increase the runway length. The AAI decided to get a runway safety area to avoid the aircraft overrunning the end of the table-top runway. On 7 August 2020, wide-body aircraft have been banned from flying to CCJ after the crash of IX 1344, which overran the table-top runway. As of November 2020, the airport does not have the recommended Runway safety area or Engineered Materials Arresting System installed. The land acquisition procedures for runway development are progressing as of July 2022.

=== Reinstatement of wide-body aircraft operations ===
As advocated by various Malayali associations like KMCC, MCC and MDF and others, Gulf Malayalis, political parties, Kerala State Government and MPs from Malabar region, on 9 August 2018, DGCA gave approval for resuming wide-body aircraft (Code E category) operations from Calicut International Airport. In the beginning, Saudia has been given permission to start nonstop flights to Jeddah and Riyadh using Boeing 777-200LR and Airbus A330-300. After three and a half years, the wide-body aircraft (Airbus 330-300) of Saudi Arabian Airlines from Jeddah landed at Calicut International Airport at 11:04 (IST) on 5 December 2018. It flew back to Jeddah on the same day at 13:19 (IST). Saudia has also resumed its services to Riyadh from Calicut in December 2018. On 5 July 2019, Saudi Arabian Airlines flew with the Boeing 777-300ER and Airbus A330-300 to CCJ. DGCA gave approval for wide-body aircraft operations of Air India from Calicut International Airport using Boeing 747-400, Boeing 777-200LR, Boeing 777-300ER, and Boeing 787-8 Dreamliner. Emirates also secured approval from DGCA to operate Boeing 777-200LR and 777-300ER from Calicut.

On 7 August 2020, Air India Express Flight 1344, a COVID-19 repatriation flight on the Dubai-Kozhikode route, overran the tabletop runway upon landing in bad weather and crashed into the runway slope, killing 21 passengers. As a result, wide-body aircraft are no longer permitted to fly to Kozhikode Airport, and as of 7 July 2022, runway renovation is in progress.

== Immigration ==
As of September 2025, FTI-TTP has commenced at Calicut International Airport

== Airlines and destinations ==
=== Passenger ===
Airlines	Destinations
Air Arabia	Ras Al Khaimah, Sharjah
Air Arabia Abu Dhabi	Abu Dhabi
Air India Express	Abu Dhabi, Al Ain, Bahrain, Bengaluru, Dammam, Doha, Dubai–International, Jeddah, Hyderabad, Kuwait City, Muscat, Ras Al Khaimah, Riyadh, Salalah, Sharjah
Akasa Air	Bengaluru, Jeddah, Mumbai, Riyadh
Etihad Airways	Abu Dhabi
Flydubai	Dubai–International
Flynas	Jeddah,Riyadh
IndiGo	Abu Dhabi, Agatti, Bengaluru, Chennai, Dammam, Delhi, Dubai–International, Hyderabad, Jeddah, Kochi, Mumbai
Oman Air	Muscat
Qatar Airways	Doha
SalamAir	Muscat, Salalah
Saudia	Jeddah (Resumes 4 December 2026), Riyadh
SpiceJet	Dubai–International , Mumbai; Seasonal: Fujairah

=== Cargo ===
The following cargo airline flies to the airport:

- SpiceXpress

== Ground Transport ==
Road

Kozhikode International Airport is located between two National Highways. The closest one is National Highway 966 (NH-966) situated at a distance of 2.3 kilometres and the other one being National Highway 66 (NH-66) which is around 8 kilometres from the airport. NH-966 joins NH-66 at Ramanattukara, located 12 kilometres from the airport. This combined road network enables seamless connectivity to the north to Kozhikode, Kannur, and Wayanad, and towards the south to Malappuram, Kondotty, Palakkad, Thrissur, and Coimbatore.

Buses

Kerala State Road Transport Corporation operates FlyBus (low-floor air con bus) services to the city of Kozhikode from the airport. This is one of the affordable options available to travel to the city, there are only a handful of these services. Travelers looking for cost effective options can take an Auto-rickshaw to Airport Junction - Kondotty (2.8 km away) where buses are available to Kozhikode, Malappuram, Palakkad etc.

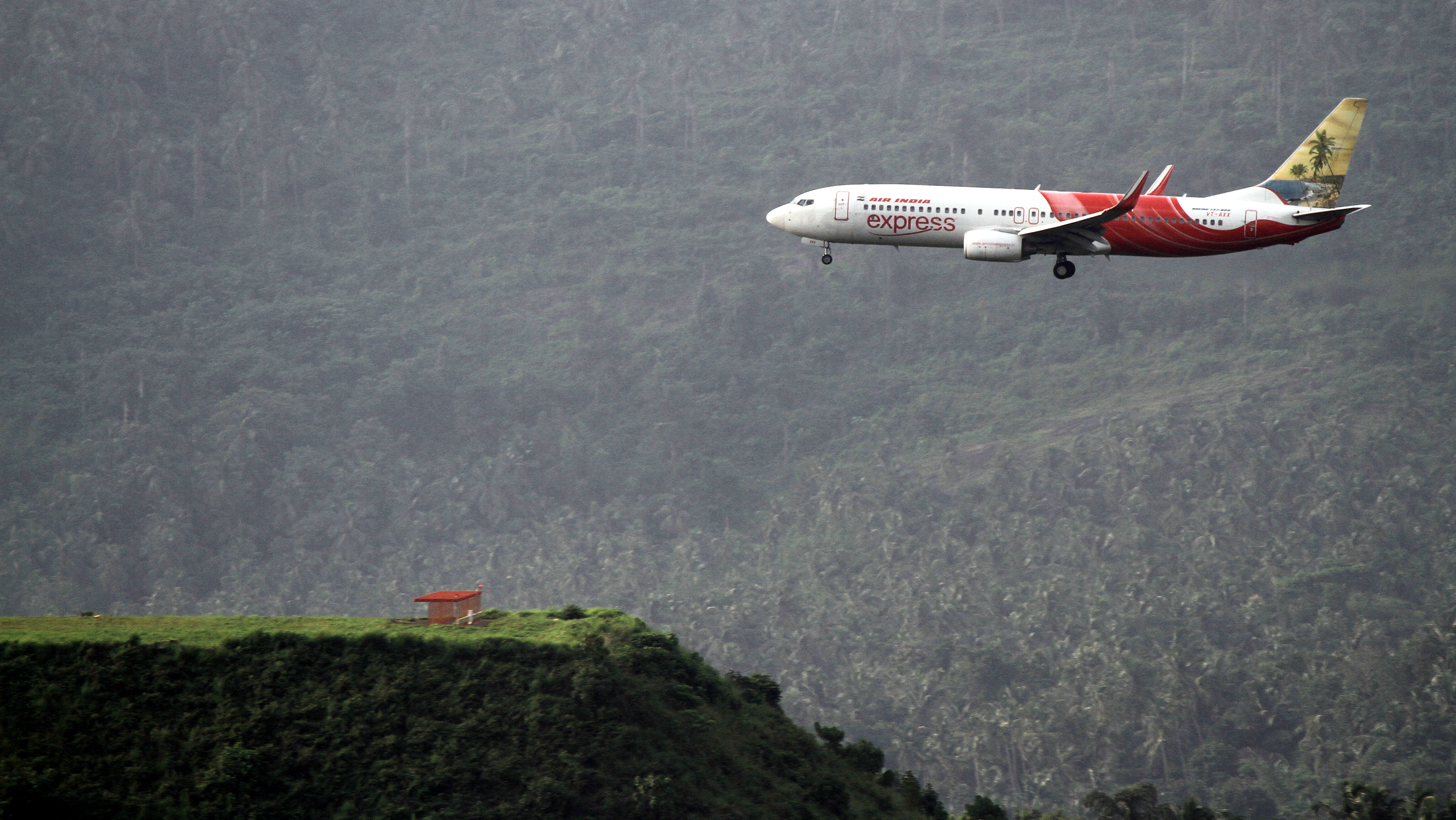
An Air India Express Boeing 737-800

Taxis

Pre-paid taxi services are available at the airport. The airport is also serviced by Uber and Ola Cabs, online cab aggregators providing various options to Calicut city and for Outstation journeys.

== Accidents and incidents ==
- On 17 January 1969, a Douglas C-47A VT-DTH of Hindu Publications crashed on take-off. The aircraft was operating a cargo flight. Both crew were killed. At the time the airport had been initialised as an air strip at Chelari Airport, a few kilometres away from the current location.
- On 7 November 2008, Air India Flight 962, an Airbus 310 flying from Jeddah, Saudi Arabia, scraped its right wingtip on the runway on landing. Parts of the plane's wing broke, leaving a mark on the runway.
- On 9 July 2012, an Air India Express Boeing 737-800 skidded on landing, during heavy rain. The aircraft's landing gear impacted with runway beacons, breaking them. There were no casualties on board.
- On 25 April 2017, Air India Flight 937, an Air India A321-200 suffered an engine failure during takeoff, the aircraft temporarily lost directional control due to asymmetric thrust resulting in a left tyre burst when it impacted the runway edge lighting. The takeoff was aborted and the flight was cancelled.
- On 4 August 2017, a SpiceJet Bombardier Dash 8 skidded on landing and damaged the ILS beacons.
- On 7 August 2020, Air India Express Flight 1344 crashed upon landing at Calicut from Dubai during poor weather. After landing, the aircraft, a Boeing 737-800, overran the tabletop runway, skidding off the end of the runway and crashing into a gorge. A total of 21 people, including both pilots, were killed in the crash. 15 people out of the 169 survivors were critically injured. The aircraft had been carrying out a repatriation flight under the Vande Bharat Mission.

== See also ==
- Kannur International Airport
- Cochin International Airport
- Trivandrum International Airport
- Aranmula International Airport
- Sabarimala International Airport
- List of Airports in Kerala
- List of airports in India
- List of the busiest airports in India
