= Bharat Swati =

Indian training monoplane by Bharat Heavy Electricals Limited

Swati
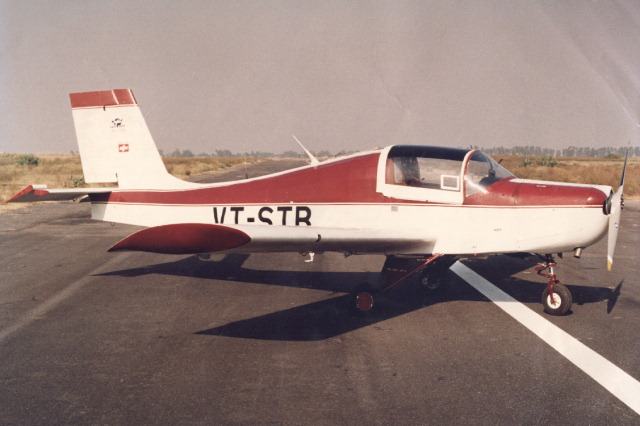

General information
- Type: Two-seat training monoplane
- National origin: India
- Manufacturer: Bharat Heavy Electricals Limited
- Designer: Directorate General of Civil Aviation
- Number built: ~20

History
- First flight: 17 November 1990

The Bharat Swati (or sometimes BHEL Swati) is an Indian two-seat training monoplane designed by the Technical Centre of the Directorate General of Civil Aviation and built by Bharat Heavy Electricals Limited.

== Design and development ==
The Swati is a low-wing cantilever monoplane with a steel tube fuselage covered in fabric at the rear and composite material at the front. It has metal tail surfaces and wooden wings and a fixed landing gear with a steerable nosewheel. The Swati has a 116 hp (87 kW) Lycoming O-235 piston engine at the front driving a two-bladed propeller. Directorate General of Civil Aviation ordered 40 to be distributed to civil flying clubs in India.

== Variants ==
- LT-1M Swati
- LT-2M Swati

== Specifications ==
Data from Brassey's World Aircraft & Systems Directory 1996

General characteristics

- Crew: 2
- Length: 7.21 m (23 ft 8 in)
- Wingspan: 9.2 m (30 ft 3 in)
- Height: 2.78 m (9 ft 1.5 in)
- Wing area: 11.96 m^{2} (128.74 sq ft)
- Empty weight: 530 kg (1,168 lb)
- Gross weight: 770 kg (1,698 lb)
- Powerplant: 1 × Lycoming O-235-N2C piston engine , 87 kW (116 hp)

Performance

- Maximum speed: 268 km/h (167 mph, 145 kn)
- Cruise speed: 195 km/h (121 mph, 105 kn)
- Range: 453 km (282 mi, 245 nmi)
- Endurance: 2 hours 45 minutes
- Service ceiling: 3,050 m (10,000 ft)

== Incidents and Accidents ==
On 3 June 1993, a Swati (VT-STC) being test flown at Haridwar crashed when its starboard wing broke off after coming out of a loop, killing the test pilot.

On 29 November 2001, a Swati LT II (VT-STO) of the Kerala Aviation Training Centre on a training flight at Thiruvananthapuram crashed due to pilot error, destroying the aircraft.
