= Bureau of Civil Aviation Security =

Indian government agency

Agency overview
- Jurisdiction: Government of India
- Parent department: Ministry of Civil Aviation

The Bureau of Civil Aviation Security (BCAS) is an attached office of the Ministry of Civil Aviation (India). It is the regulatory authority for civil aviation security in India. It is headed by an officer of the rank of Director General of Police (DGP) and is designated as Director General of Bureau of Civil Aviation Security. The Director General, BCAS is the appropriate authority for implementation of Annexure 17(Security: Safeguarding International Civil Aviation Against Acts of Unlawful Interference) to Chicago convention of International Civil Aviation Organization. The Director General, BCAS is responsible for the development, implementation and maintenance of the National Civil Aviation Security Programme.

== History ==
The BCAS was initially set up as a Cell in the Directorate General of Civil Aviation(DGCA) in January 1978 on the recommendation of the Pande Committee constituted in the wake of the hijacking of the Indian Airlines flight on 10 September 1976. The role of the Cell was to coordinate, inspect, monitor and train personnel in Civil Aviation Security matters.

The BCAS was reorganized into an independent department in April 1987 under the Ministry of Civil Aviation as a sequel to the Kanishka Tragedy in June 1985. The main responsibility of BCAS is to lay down standards and measures in respect of security of civil flights at International and domestic airports in India.

The office of BCAS headquarter is located at "A" Wing, I-III floor, Janpath Bhawan, Janpath, New Delhi. The agency has twenty regional offices, located at various airports i.e. Ahmedabad, Amritsar, Bengaluru, Bhopal, Bhubaneswar, Chennai, Delhi, Dehradun, Guwahati, Hyderabad, Imphal, Jaipur, Kochi, Kolkata, Lucknow, Mumbai, Patna, Raipur, Ranchi and Srinagar.

== Director General ==
Rajesh Nirwan, a 1992 batch IPS officer of Rajasthan cadre, has been appointed as the Director General of Bureau of Civil Aviation Security (BCAS) in the Ministry of Civil Aviation. BCAS is a wing of the Civil Aviation Ministry looking after civil aviation security. His appointment was cleared by the Appointments Committee of the Cabinet headed by the Prime Minister.

== See also ==
- Aircraft Accident Investigation Bureau (India)
- Airline codes
- Airports Authority of India
- Aviation safety
- Directorate General of Civil Aviation (India)
- International Civil Aviation Organization
- Chicago Convention on International Civil Aviation
