= Authenticated Identity Body =

Authenticated Identity Body (AIB) is a mechanism used in the Session Initiation Protocol (SIP) to verify the identity of the sender of a message. It allows communicating parties in a network to exchange authenticated identity information, improving the security and integrity of SIP communications such as Voice over IP (VoIP) calls.

An AIB works by embedding a digitally signed section inside a SIP message. The sender signs specific SIP headers such as From, To, or Call-ID to prove that the message genuinely originates from the claimed identity. Additional headers, such as Date or Contact, may also be included in the signed data to protect against replay attacks and maintain reference integrity.

AIBs build upon existing authentication methods like S/MIME, but are designed to be more narrowly focused on verifying message origin and preventing identity spoofing in SIP environments.

The specification for Authenticated Identity Bodies is defined in RFC 3893. According to the document, AIBs may optionally be encrypted to protect end-to-end privacy. In such cases, encryption should occur before the AIB is signed. The security of the encrypted AIB depends on proper key distribution among trusted hosts, which may be practical in controlled networks (for example, within telephone providers or federations of trusted systems).

== See also ==
- RFC 3893
- Session Initiation Protocol
- Encryption
- Cryptography
