= AAIIB =

AAIIB may refer to:

- Air Accident and Incident Investigation Board of Cyprus
- Aircraft Accident and Incident Investigation Bureau of the Republic of Latvia, now the Transport Accident and Incident Investigation Bureau
- Aircraft Accident and Inquiry Investigation Board, a division of the Civil Aviation Authority of the Philippines
