= Atlanta Interfaith Broadcasters =

AIB TV - Atlanta Interfaith Broadcasters is an interfaith, spiritual and educational television and internet network with its studios and offices located in Midtown Atlanta. The cable network can be viewed in 35 Atlanta Metro counties on Xfinity channel 295, along with AT&T U-verse channel 6. The network's programming is also available streaming individually on-demand and through a live stream of its air-feed worldwide from the station's website.
