= Aircraft Accident Investigation Bureau (India) =

Government division

Agency overview
- Formed: 30 July 2012
- Jurisdiction: India
- Headquarters: Safdarjung Airport New Delhi
- Minister responsible: Minister of Civil Aviation
- Agency executive: GVG Yugandhar, Director General
- Parent department: Ministry of Civil Aviation
- Website: aaib.gov.in

The Aircraft Accident Investigation Bureau (AAIB) is a division of the Ministry of Civil Aviation, Government of India which investigates aircraft accidents and incidents in India.

The head office is in Udaan Bhawan, an office building on the property of Safdarjung Airport in New Delhi. Previously the head office was elsewhere on the airport property.

== Statutory backing ==
Earlier, the Directorate General of Civil Aviation (DGCA) conducted investigations and gave information to the investigations established by the Court of Inquiry and the Committee Inquiry. A separate investigative agency was established to comply with the Standards And Recommended Practices (SARPs), Annex 13, of the International Civil Aviation Organization (ICAO).

The agency was established by Order No. AV-15029/002/2008-CG dated 26 May 2011. The Aircraft (Investigation of Accidents and Incidents) Rules, 2012 came into effect on 5 July 2012. The aircraft rules, clause 8, provide for setting up of an Aircraft Accident Investigation Bureau, which was done on 30 July 2012 by Order No. AV. 11012/01/2011 - DG.

== Investigations ==
AAIB, India has carried out more than 150 Accident and Incident investigations so far including major accidents such as Air India Express Flight 1344 and Air India Flight 171.

== See also ==
- Bureau of Civil Aviation Security
- International Civil Aviation Organization
- Airline codes
- Aviation Safety
- Directorate General of Civil Aviation (India)
- Airport Authority of India
- Commission of Railway Safety – Railway safety investigator
