= Air India Flight 171 =

2025 aviation accident in India

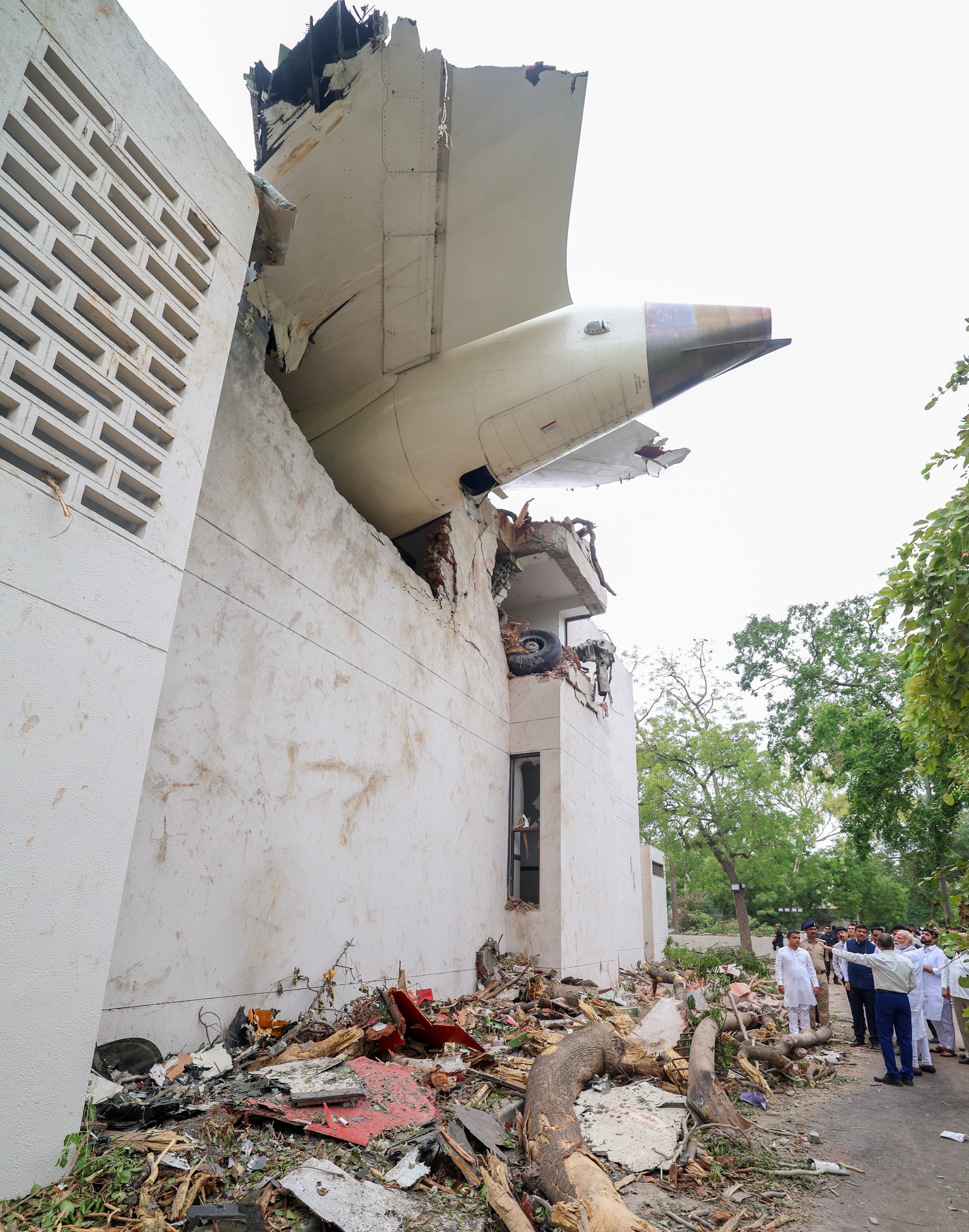
- The aircraft's tail section wedged into a college building

Accident
- Date: 12 June 2025
- Summary: Crashed shortly after takeoff; fuel cutoff causing both engines to shut down; under investigation
- Site: B. J. Medical College, Ahmedabad, Gujarat, India; 23°03′17.8″N 72°36′43.6″E
- Total fatalities: 260
- Total injuries: 68

Aircraft
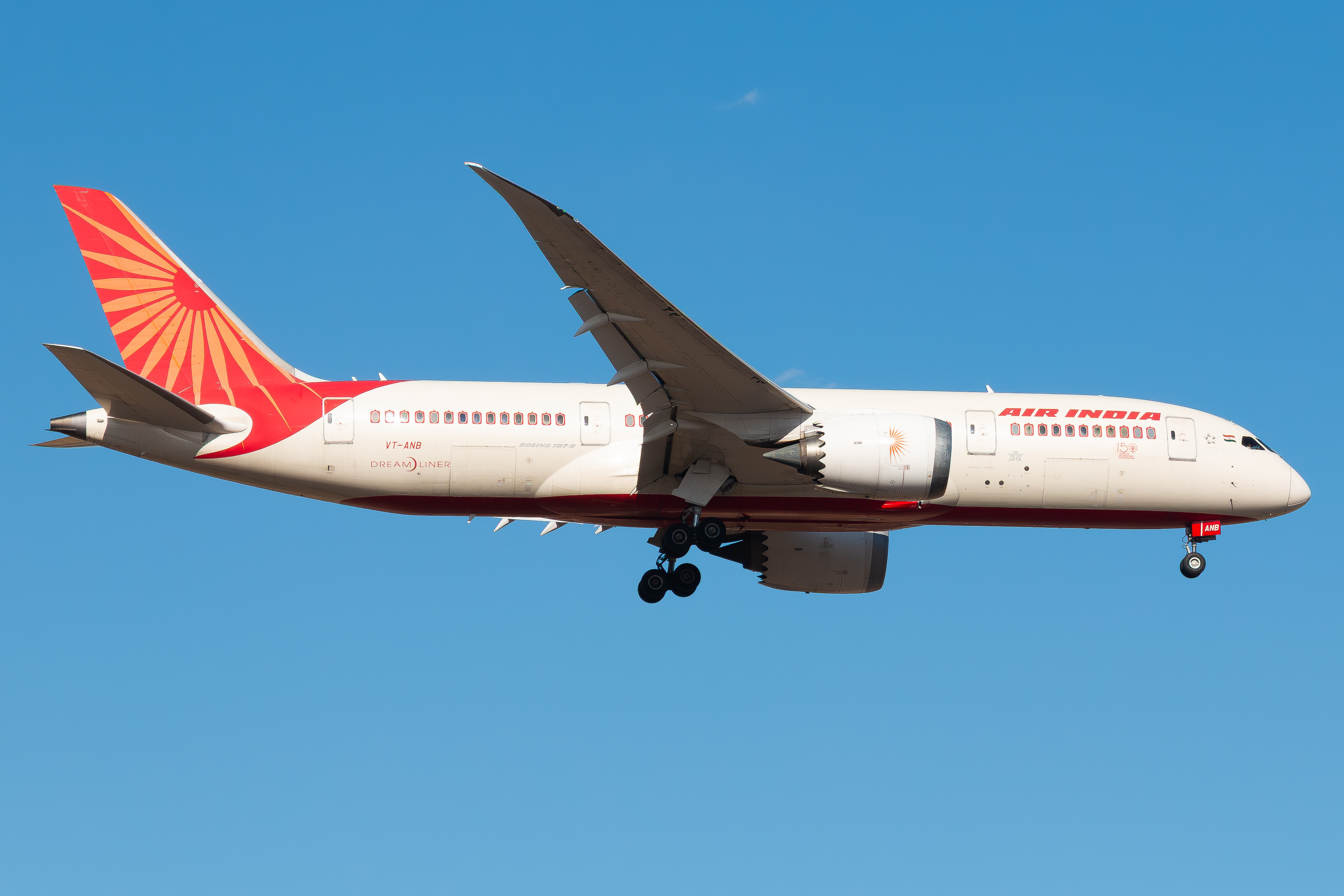
- VT-ANB, the aircraft involved in the accident, seen in 2024
- Aircraft type: Boeing 787-8 Dreamliner
- Operator: Air India
- IATA flight No.: AI171
- ICAO flight No.: AIC171
- Call sign: AIRINDIA 171
- Registration: VT-ANB
- Flight origin: Sardar Vallabhbhai Patel International Airport, Ahmedabad, Gujarat, India
- Destination: Gatwick Airport, Crawley, West Sussex, England
- Occupants: 242
- Passengers: 230
- Crew: 12
- Fatalities: 241
- Injuries: 1
- Survivors: 1

Ground casualties
- Ground fatalities: 19
- Ground injuries: 67

Air India Flight 171 was a scheduled international passenger flight from Ahmedabad Airport, Gujarat, India, to London Gatwick Airport in Crawley, West Sussex, England. On 12 June 2025, at 13:39 IST (08:09 UTC), the Boeing 787-8 Dreamliner operating the flight crashed 32 seconds after takeoff into the student hostels of the Byramjee Jeejeebhoy Medical College, 1.7 kilometres (1 mi; 0.9 nmi) from the runway. Of the 12 crew members and 230 passengers on board, only one passenger survived. On the ground, 19 people were killed, and 67 others were seriously injured.

The aircraft was destroyed, and several college buildings were severely damaged by the impact and subsequent fire. This was the first fatal accident and hull loss involving a Boeing 787 since the type entered service in 2011.

A preliminary report was released on 12 July 2025 by India's Aircraft Accident Investigation Bureau (AAIB), with the aircraft's front enhanced airborne flight recorder indicating that the crash was caused by the loss of thrust in both engines after their fuel control switches transitioned from RUN to CUTOFF three seconds after liftoff. In July 2026, the AAIB estimated that a draft final report would be completed by October 2026. As of November 2026 it has not yet been released.

== Background ==
=== Aircraft and route ===
The aircraft involved in the crash was a Boeing 787-8 Dreamliner registered VT-ANB with 41,868 hours on the airframe. It was delivered to Air India in January 2014. The aircraft's two General Electric GEnx-1B70 engines had about 28,000 and 33,000 operating hours, and both had been installed less than three months before the crash.

Air India began operating flights to London Gatwick Airport in 2023. At the time of the crash, it operated five departures a week from Ahmedabad.

Air India retired flight number AI171 and its reciprocal AI172, and began to use the flight numbers AI159 and AI160 respectively on the Ahmedabad–London Gatwick route after its initial pause in July 2025, when the airline decided to switch to London Heathrow from August to October. By late-October 2025, the Ahmedabad–London Gatwick route was reinstated and continued using AI159 and AI160. Air India subsidiary Air India Express also retired the flight number IX171 for similar reasons.

=== Passengers and crew ===
There were 230 passengers and 12 crew on board; 13 passengers were children, 2 of them infants, while 2 pilots and 10 flight attendants formed the crew. The passenger manifest included 169 Indians, 53 Britons, 7 Portuguese, and 1 Canadian.

The flight was commanded by Captain Sumeet Sabharwal, 56, who had logged approximately 15,600 flight hours, including nearly 8,600 hours on the Boeing 787. The first officer, Clive Kunder, 32, had around 3,400 flight hours, with about 1,100 of those on the Boeing 787. Kunder was the pilot flying, while Sabharwal was the pilot monitoring.

== Accident ==
Map of flight path and crash site

CCTV footage showing the plane's takeoff roll and crash

The aircraft was cleared for a full-length takeoff on runway 23, and lifted off at 13:38:39 IST after a 62-second takeoff roll. Surface winds were light at 6 knots (11 km/h; 6.9 mph), and visibility was 6 kilometres (3.7 mi; 3.2 nmi) with no significant cloud cover. The aircraft's ADS-B transponder reported a maximum pressure altitude of around 625 feet (190 m) above mean sea level while climbing over the runway. Flight recorder data showed a maximum airspeed of 180 knots (330 km/h; 210 mph) and a total airborne time of 32 seconds.

The aircraft began to lose altitude and crashed into the hostel block of the B. J. Medical College campus attached to the Ahmedabad Civil Hospital 1.7 kilometres (1 mi; 0.9 nmi) from the runway. The initial point of impact was a tree, after which the aircraft's tail struck the top of the campus canteen, with wings level and the nose pitched up by about eight degrees, causing the tail to detach. The aircraft continued breaking up as it collided with additional structures, with parts of the flight deck coming to rest approximately 200 metres (650 ft) from the mess hall impact site. The wreckage, from the first impact point to the last identified component, was distributed over an area approximately 300 by 120 metres (1,000 by 400 ft). In total, five buildings were severely damaged by the impact and subsequent fire, including student accommodation and the resident doctors' hostel.

A video recording from an airport CCTV camera looking down the runway captured the aircraft taking off, initially gaining altitude, then descending gradually. Another video taken by an aviation enthusiast about 200 metres (660 ft) outside the airport perimeter showed it passing almost overhead just before impact. Both videos showed the aircraft sinking out of view, with fire and smoke rising from the crash site a few seconds later. According to CNN, the enthusiast later told the reporters that it had been behaving strangely, wobbling from side to side, and that the tail appeared to "sag more deeply beneath its nose" as it descended.

This was the first fatal accident and hull loss involving the Boeing 787 since it entered service in 2011.

== Rescue and relief operation ==
The first call to the fire and emergency control room was received at 13:45 IST. Two firefighter teams were sent immediately from Naroda, and the "brigade call" was issued. More than 300 firefighters, 60 fire vehicles, and 20 water bowsers were deployed in response. The Ahmedabad Fire and Emergency Services Department later confirmed the deployment of units from various city divisions. Multiple ambulances, including 20 ambulances from the fire department, were rushed to the location. All roads leading to the crash site and surrounding areas were closed to facilitate rescue operations. Teams and fire vehicles from fire service stations in neighbouring cities including Vadodara, Gandhinagar, GIFT City, and from establishments such as Oil and Natural Gas Corporation, and Civil Defence were also sent to the scene to render aid.

The Central Industrial Security Force, responsible for security at Ahmedabad Airport, was among the first responders. Teams from the Indian Army, Border Security Force, Central Reserve Police Force, National Disaster Response Force, and Western Railways were deployed to assist with rescue and relief efforts, and a military hospital was put on standby. The Ahmedabad Municipal Corporation deployed more than 150 vehicles, including earthmovers, excavators, trucks, and a roller, to clear debris from the site. The corporation also deployed engineers and health department personnel, and ordered the emergency readiness of the municipal hospitals in the city. Shortly after the crash, all flight operations at the Ahmedabad airport were suspended before resuming later in the day in a limited capacity.

== Casualties ==
Location of the sole survivor's seat (11A), and emergency exits in the forward section of Air India's older Boeing 787–8 configuration

Of the 242 people on board the aircraft, all 12 crew members and 229 of the 230 passengers died in the crash. On the ground, an additional 19 people were killed, and 67 were seriously injured. The intense heat of the post-crash fires, which had reached an estimated 1,500 °C (2,700 °F), greatly complicated victim identification. However, by 28 June, the remains of all 260 victims had been identified, primarily through DNA profiling. Among the casualties was Vijay Rupani, the Chief Minister of Gujarat from 2016 to 2021, whose body was identified by DNA on 15 June.

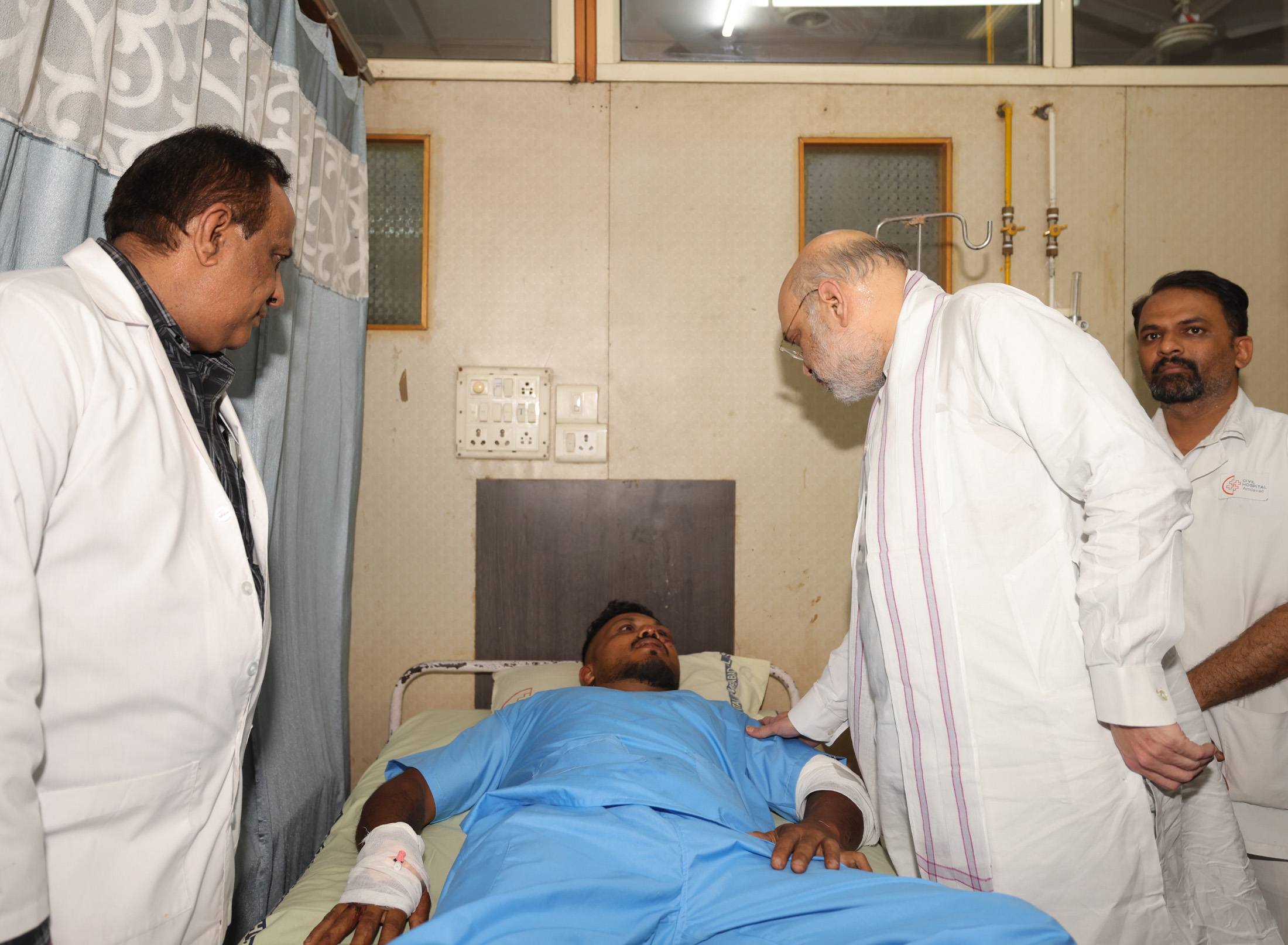
Home Minister Amit Shah visits the sole survivor in hospital

The sole survivor of the crash was 40-year-old British citizen Vishwash Kumar Ramesh, who had seated in Seat 11A, which is next to an emergency exit. Ramesh said that the section of the aircraft where he was seated detached and came to rest on the ground floor of the hostel, and he escaped through an opening created when the emergency exit broke open. He was filmed walking away from the wreckage before being led to an ambulance. Ramesh sustained multiple minor injuries, including facial cuts and burns to his left hand, and was discharged from the hospital after five days. Six days after the crash, he attended the funeral of his brother, who had also been on the flight. He has been diagnosed with post-traumatic stress disorder (PTSD) as a result of the crash.

== Investigation ==
India's Aircraft Accident Investigation Bureau (AAIB) was tasked with the investigation of the crash. The British Air Accidents Investigation Branch dispatched a team of four investigators, and the United States National Transportation Safety Board (NTSB) sent a "go team" to assist with the investigation. The US Federal Aviation Administration (FAA) said that it "[stood] ready to launch a team immediately" in support of the NTSB. GE Aerospace, which manufactured the aircraft's engines, said it would send a team to India and analyse cockpit data.

On 13 June, the first of the aircraft's two enhanced airborne flight recorders (EAFR), each of which performs the functions of both a flight data recorder and a cockpit voice recorder, was recovered from the mess hall rooftop. The second EAFR was recovered from the crash debris on 16 June. The data from the front recorder was successfully downloaded on 24 June at the AAIB laboratory in Delhi; the rear recorder was substantially damaged, preventing data recovery via the usual methods.

India's Directorate General of Civil Aviation (DGCA) and Air India opened parallel inquiries into the accident. On 13 June, the DGCA ordered additional pre-departure technical inspections for the airline's Boeing 787 fleet, starting on 15 June. The DGCA also directed Air India to execute additional maintenance and inspections on fuel-parameter monitoring and associated systems, cabin air compressor and associated systems, electronic engine control system test, engine fuel driven actuator-operational test, and oil-system checks for the Boeing 787-8 and 787-9 aircraft in its fleet.

On 27 November, The Wall Street Journal reported tensions between American and Indian investigators stemming from the view amongst American government and industry officials that the evidence suggested the captain of the flight, Sumeet Sabharwal, deliberately crashed the airliner. On 30 January, Bloomberg News reported that according to sources close to the investigation, investigators were leaning towards the conclusion that one of the pilots had deliberately crashed the aircraft, having ruled out a mechanical failure or sabotage.

On 24 June 2026, GE Aerospace sent their engine analysis reports to the AAIB.

=== Preliminary report ===
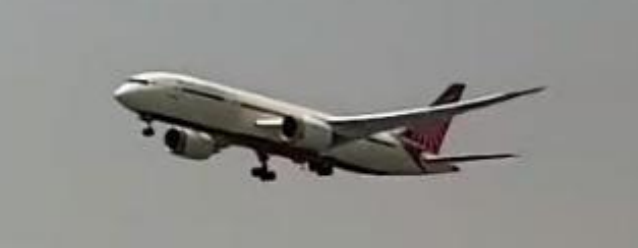
A CCTV still showing the deployed ram air turbine (RAT) (in between the main wheels)

On 12 July, the AAIB released a preliminary report outlining its initial findings. After a 62-second takeoff roll, the aircraft rotated at an airspeed of 155 knots (287 km/h; 178 mph), and lifted off 4 seconds later at 13:38:39 IST. As the aircraft reached its maximum recorded airspeed of 180 knots (330 km/h; 210 mph) 3 seconds after lifting off the runway, both fuel control switches transitioned from RUN to CUTOFF, 1 second apart, per EAFR data. Both engines immediately shut down and stopped producing thrust. Airport CCTV showed no significant bird activity in the flight path, and the aircraft began losing altitude before crossing the airport perimeter.

The cockpit voice recording captured one pilot asking the other why he had performed the cutoff, to which the other pilot replied that he had not done so. The report did not identify which pilot made either statement. According to flight recorder data and airport CCTV footage, the ram air turbine (RAT) deployed automatically and began producing emergency hydraulic and electric power 5 seconds after the first switch transitioned. The first switch transitioned to RUN about 10 seconds after it transitioned to CUTOFF, and the second switch transitioned to RUN about 4 seconds after that. Each engine's full authority digital engine control (FADEC) then automatically attempted to restart them.

About 9 seconds after the second switch transitioned to RUN, one of the pilots issued a mayday call, reporting a loss of thrust. An air traffic controller requested the flight's call sign, but received no response. The cockpit voice and flight data recordings ended 6 seconds after the mayday call, 32 seconds after takeoff, at 13:39:11. At that point in time, the first engine had re-lit and was beginning to spool up. The second engine had also re-lit, but its core speed continued to fall while its FADEC introduced additional fuel in an attempt to recover thrust.

The preliminary report noted that the FAA had issued a Special Airworthiness Information Bulletin (SAIB) in 2018, warning that fuel switches similar to those on the 787 had been installed on Boeing 737 aircraft with locking mechanisms disengaged, the exact nature of which was not described. The incident aircraft's maintenance records showed that its throttle control module had been replaced in 2019 and 2023 for reasons unrelated to the fuel switches, and that no fuel switch defects had been reported since then.

The FAA recommended that all owners and operators of various Boeing aircraft models inspect the locking feature of the fuel control switch at their earliest opportunity in the 2018 SAIB. Air India said it had not performed the recommended inspections because they were not mandatory.

The throttle levers were found in the idle position when recovered after the crash; however, the flight recorder data showed that both had been kept at takeoff thrust until impact. The recovered flap controls and flight recorder data showed that flaps had been properly set for take-off at five degrees.

The report did not identify any mechanical faults nor recommend safety actions for operators or manufacturers of the 787 or its GEnx engines.

==== Fuel control switches ====
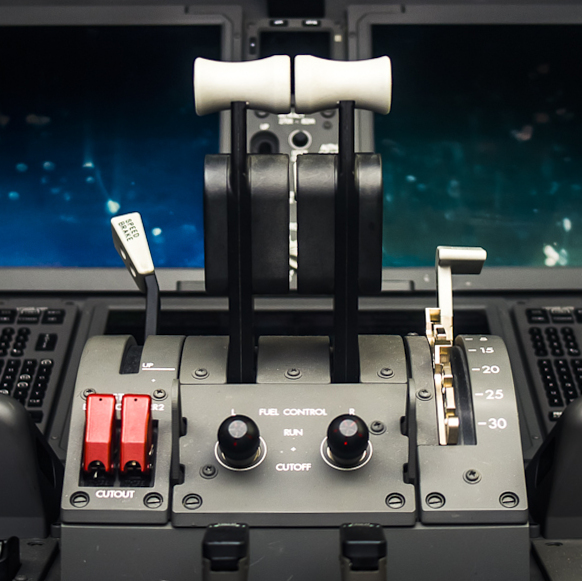
The two fuel control switches (bottom center) on a Boeing 787-8 are located beneath the throttle levers, with the RUN and CUTOFF positions labelled in white

On the Boeing 787, the two fuel control switches are part of the throttle control module and are located just below their respective throttle levers. Moving a switch from RUN to CUTOFF immediately halts fuel flow to that engine, causing a loss of thrust, as well as the electrical and hydraulic power that engine supplies. These switches are normally only used on the ground for engine startup and shutdown. In flight, cutting off the fuel to an engine is only done in emergencies such as an engine fire or some other malfunction warranting a shutdown or restart. To prevent accidental activation, each switch is fitted with a spring-loaded locking mechanism that requires the switch to be pulled out before it can be moved up or down between RUN and CUTOFF. Additionally, brackets on either side guard the switches from unintentional contact.

=== Interim statement ===
On 12 June 2026, which marked the first anniversary of the accident, India's AAIB released an interim statement. According to the statement, significant progress had been made in the examination and analysis of all the evidence relevant to the investigation. On 15 July, the AAIB estimated the investigation would be completed in six weeks, and a draft final report available by October.

== Responses ==
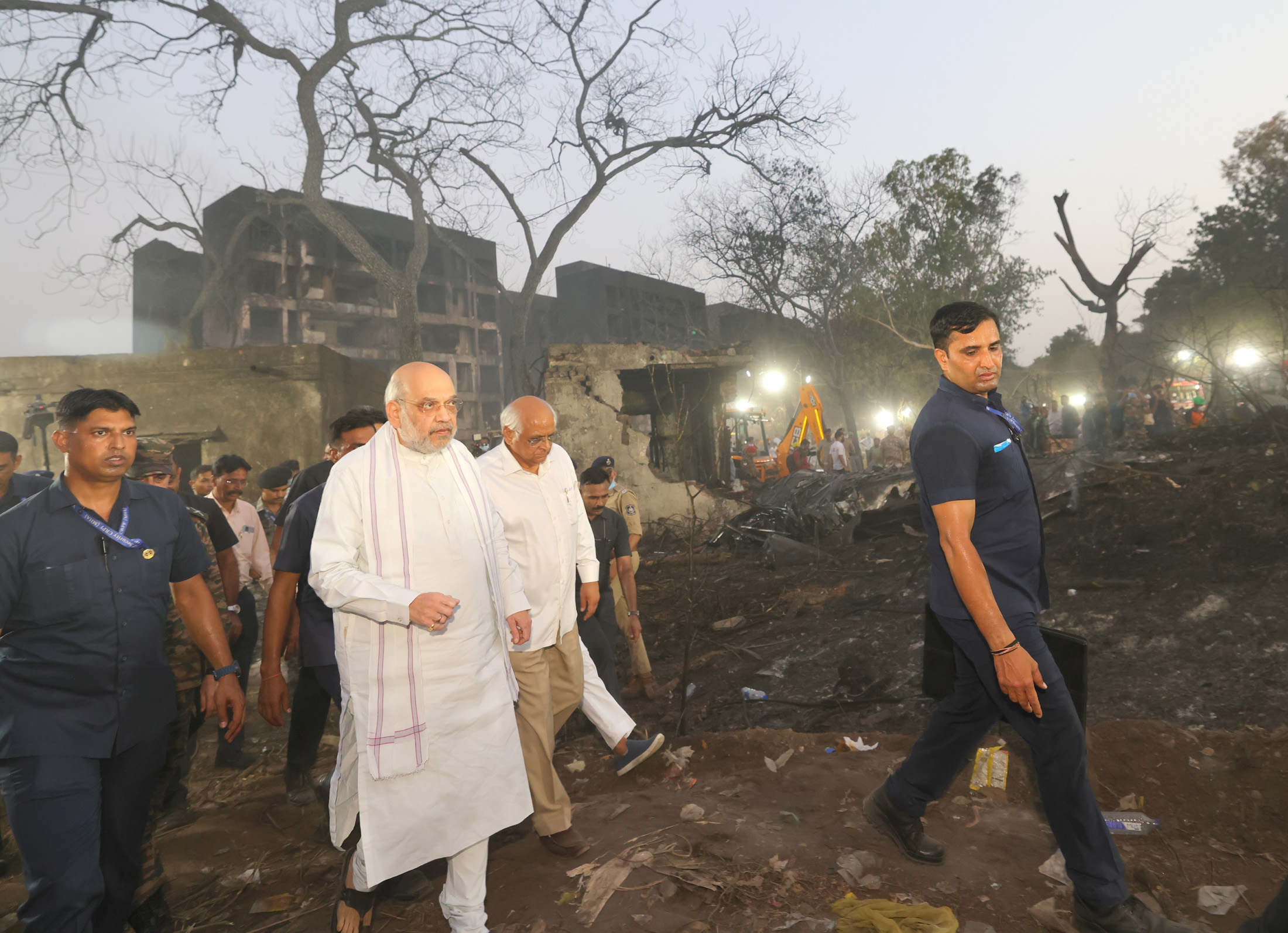
Home Minister Amit Shah (centre-left) and Bhupendrabhai Patel, the Chief Minister of Gujarat (centre-right), both in white, surveying the crash site

Prime Minister Narendra Modi visited the crash site on 13 June 2025. He also met the lone survivor from the crash and those who had been injured on the ground in hospital. Home Minister Amit Shah spoke with the Gujarat chief minister, Bhupendrabhai Patel, following the incident. Patel stated that officials had been instructed to carry out "immediate rescue and relief operations" and to make arrangements on a "war footing".

UK prime minister Keir Starmer expressed his condolences, and the UK Foreign Office arranged crisis teams in India and the UK. To honour the victims, King Charles III requested that senior royals wear black armbands and that a minute of silence be observed at the 14 June Trooping the Colour ceremony.

On the day of the crash, Air India chairman Natarajan Chandrasekaran issued a statement expressing the "deepest condolences" to those affected, and that the airline was focused on supporting victims and their families, and assisting emergency response teams at the site. Speaking to the airline's 700 staff on 17 June, he said that crash was "the most heartbreaking one, which I thought I would never see", and that the incident should serve "as a driving force to create a safer airline". Air India CEO Campbell Wilson stated that "this is a difficult day for all of us at Air India", saying that special teams of caregivers would be mobilised for additional support and adding that the investigations would take time. Air India Flight 143, flying from Delhi to Paris with Wilson aboard, returned to Delhi for him to assist the airline with the crisis.

One week after the crash, about two weeks before the AAIB issued its preliminary report, Air India training captains performed a series of 787–8 simulator experiments duplicating what was then known about the flight's weight and balance profile. They found that even with flaps retracted and landing gear left down after takeoff, the aircraft was able to climb safely with only one engine producing thrust. The pilots also attempted to simulate electrical failures that could cause a dual-engine flame-out—which is deemed unrecoverable below the flight's maximum recorded altitude—but were unsuccessful.

On 14 July, following the release of the preliminary report, the Indian Commercial Pilots' Association criticised what it called "reckless and unfounded insinuation of pilot suicide", while the Airline Pilots' Association of India said it was "surprised at the secrecy surrounding these investigations" and that "suitably qualified personnel were not taken on board for the probe". On 17 July, the AAIB released an appeal discouraging speculation from the public and the media.

On 17 July, Ben Berman, a former senior NTSB official said that according to him, the preliminary report suggested a deliberate act, on the basis that the fuel control switches were flipped in succession, one second apart.

On 22 July, Air India said that it had concluded inspections of its fleet of Boeing planes and had not found any problems with the locking mechanisms of their fuel switches.

On 7 November, in its preliminary observations, the Supreme Court of India stated: "It's extremely unfortunate that this crash took place ... but there's no insinuation against the pilot in the preliminary report [...] The investigation report merely records the communication between the two pilots [and] does not apportion blame".

== Aftermath ==
=== Compensation and settlements ===
On the day of the crash, Tata Group, the parent company of Air India, announced voluntary payments of ₹10 million (equivalent to ₹10 million or US$110,000 in 2026) to the family of each deceased passenger, along with coverage of medical expenses for those injured. Under the terms of the Montreal Convention of 1999, Air India is liable to pay approximately ₹15 million (equivalent to ₹15 million or US$170,000 in 2026) to the families of each deceased passenger. The Tata Group later extended the same compensation to the families of on-ground victims who were killed or injured, following a request by the Indian Medical Association.

Cash settlements were offered by Air India (of undisclosed amounts) to families of the victims, on the condition that they do not initiate legal action against the airline and the aircraft manufacturer. Air India responded that "there is absolutely no deadline or pressure on any family or individual to accept our offer within a set timeframe."

The company also announced plans to assist in rebuilding the five damaged college buildings, all of which were declared unsafe by authorities. More than 150 resident doctors, including some who resided with their families, were moved to faculty and staff quarters or other temporary accommodation on campus.

=== Boeing 787 fleet groundings ===
Immediately after the crash, Air India suspended 83 wide-body flights for six weeks to perform government-mandated safety checks on its Boeing 787 fleet, and began gradually restoring routes mid-July.

=== FAA response ===
The FAA privately issued a Continued Airworthiness Notification on 11 July stating "although the fuel control switch design, including the locking feature, is similar on various Boeing airplane models, the FAA does not consider this issue to be an unsafe condition that would warrant an Airworthiness Directive on any Boeing airplane models, including the Model 787." "We feel very comfortable that this isn’t an issue with inadvertent manipulation of fuel control," said Bryan Bedford, FAA's administrator.

=== Boeing response ===
Boeing CEO Kelly Ortberg cancelled his plans to attend the Paris Air Show and offered his condolences to the victims. Ortberg also said he would send a team of experts to aid the investigators at the crash site. The company's share price sank almost 9% in pre-market trading following the crash, and reached a post-crash low in regular trading on 12 June before rising over 13% in just over a month by 14 July. Analysts noted that the stock rose 1.6% that day—the first trading day since the AAIB released its preliminary report on 12 July—attributing the rise to the FAA indicating that it was unlikely an issue in the fuel switch design had caused the crash, with no airworthiness directives to manufacturers or operators of 787 aircraft being issued.

Boeing also privately issued a Multi-Operator-Message to the airlines, stating it was not recommending any action based on the AAIB Preliminary Report.

== See also ==
- 2025 in aviation
- List of aircraft accidents and incidents by number of ground fatalities
- List of aviation accidents and incidents with a sole survivor
- List of deadliest aircraft accidents and incidents
