= Directorate General of Civil Aviation (India) =

National civil aviation authority of the Government of India

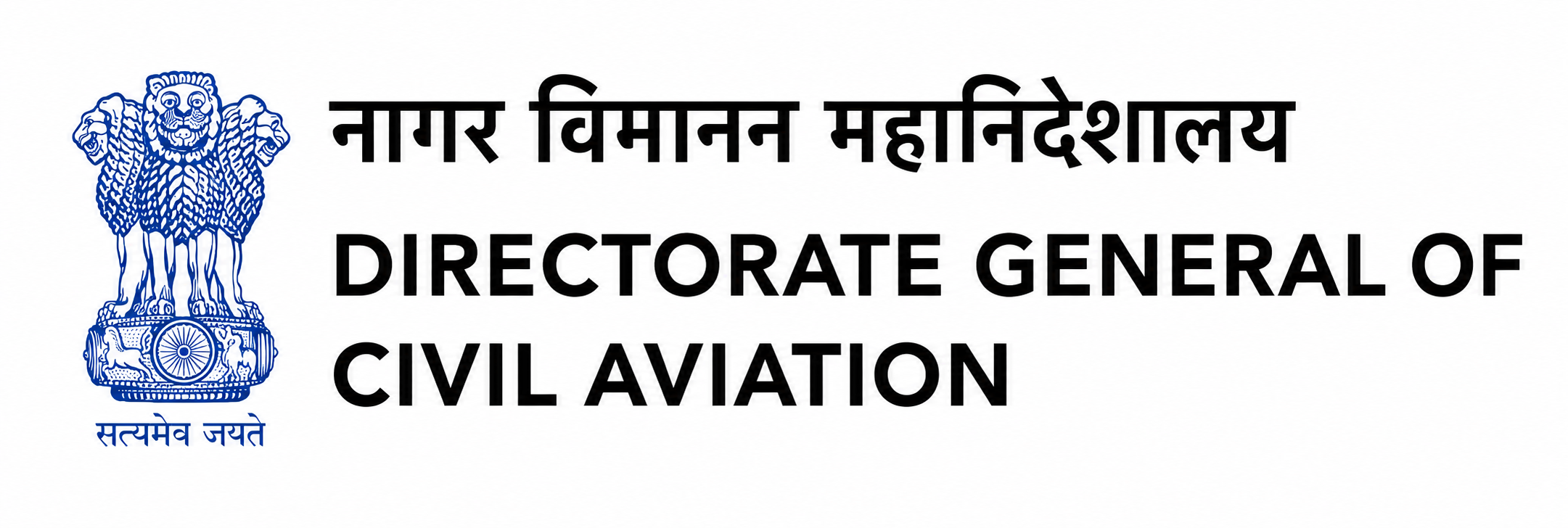
- Logo of Directorate General of Civil Aviation

Regulator overview
- Jurisdiction: Government of India
- Headquarters: Office of Director General Of Civil Aviation, opp. Safdarjung Airport, New Delhi; 28°34′58.56″N 77°12′47.12″E
- Ministers responsible: Kinjarapu Ram Mohan Naidu, Minister of Civil Aviation; Murlidhar Mohol, Minister of State of Civil Aviation
- Deputy Ministers responsible: -
- Regulator executives: Vir Vikram Yadav, IAS, Director General; Bir Singh Rai, JDG; G. Rajasekar, JDG; Ravi Krishna, JDG; Pradeep Pathak, JDG; P. K. Srivastava, JDG; Puja Singh Mandol, JDG
- Parent department: Ministry of Civil Aviation (India)
- Parent Regulator: Ministry of Civil Aviation (India)
- Website: dgca.gov.in

The Directorate General of Civil Aviation (DGCA) is a statutory body of the Government of India to regulate civil aviation in India. It became a statutory body under the Aircraft (Amendment) Act, 2020. The DGCA investigates aviation accidents and incidents, maintains all regulations related to aviation and is responsible for issuance of licenses pertaining to aviation like PPL's, SPL's and CPL's in India. It is headquartered along Sri Aurobindo Marg, opposite Safdarjung Airport, in New Delhi. The Government of India is planning to replace the organisation with a Civil Aviation Authority (CAA), modelled on the lines of the American Federal Aviation Administration (FAA).

== Vision ==
Endeavour to promote safe and efficient Air Transportation through regulation and proactive safety oversight system.

== Functions ==
1. Registration of civil aircraft
2. Certification of airports
3. Licensing to pilots, aircraft maintenance engineers, air traffic controllers and flight engineers, and conducting examinations and checks for that purpose. For pilot licences, the DGCA prescribes written examinations in core subjects including Air Regulations, Aviation Meteorology, Air Navigation, and Technical General.
4. Carrying out amendments to the Aircraft Act, the Aircraft Rules and the Civil Aviation Requirements for complying with the amendments to ICAO Annexes, and initiating proposals for amendment to any other Act or for passing a new Act in order to give effect to an international Convention or amendment to an existing convention.
5. Formulation of standards of airworthiness for civil aircraft registered in India and grant of certificates of airworthiness to such aircraft
6. Conducting investigation into incidents and serious incidents involving aircraft up to 2250 kg AUW and taking accident prevention measures, including formulation of implementation of Safety Aviation Management Programmes
7. Checks on the proficiency of flight crew and other operational personnel such as flight dispatchers and cabin crew
8. Coordination of ICAO matters with all agencies, sending replies to State letters, and taking all necessary action arising out of the Universal Safety Oversight Audit Programme (USOAP) of ICAO.
9. Granting Air Operator's Certificates to Indian carriers and regulation of air transport services operating to/from/within/over India by Indian and foreign operators, including clearance of scheduled and non-scheduled flights of such operators
10. Approval of institutes engaged in flying training including simulator training, AME training, air traffic services training or any other training related with aviation, with a view to ensuring a high quality of training
11. Approval to aircraft maintenance, repair, design and manufacturing organizations and their continued oversight
12. A nodal agency for implementing Annex 9 provisions in India and for coordinating matters relating to facilitation at Indian airports, including holding meetings of the National Facilitation Committee DGCA Organisation Manual
13. Rendering advice to the Government on matters relating to air transport including bilateral air services agreements, on ICAO matters and generally on all technical matters relating to civil aviation, and to act as an overall regulatory and developmental body for civil aviation in the country
14. Keeping a check on aircraft noise and engine emissions in accordance with ICAO Annex 16 and collaborating with the environmental authorities in this matter, if required
15. Regulation and oversight of matters related to Air Navigation Services. Coordination at national level for flexi-use of air space by civil and military air traffic agencies and interaction with ICAO for provision of more air routes for civil use through Indian airspace
16. Promoting indigenous design and manufacture of aircraft and aircraft components by acting as a catalytic agent
17. Approving training programmes of operators for carriage of dangerous goods, issuing authorizations for carriage of dangerous goods, etc.
18. Safety Oversight of all entities approved/ certified/ licensed under the Aircraft Rules 1937.

== Departments ==
These are classified and divided into the following:

1. Administration Directorate
2. Aerodrome Standards Directorate (AD)
3. Air Safety Directorate (DAS)
4. Air Transport Directorate (AT)
5. Airworthiness Directorate (DAW) (which is also responsible for registering drones in India)
6. Central Examination Organisation(CEO) ( Responsible for conducting Online Examination for Pilots and AMEs)
7. Flight Standards Directorate (FSD)
8. Information & Regulation Directorate (DRI)
9. Aircraft Engineering Directorate (AED)
10. Directorate Of Flying Training (DFT)
11. Medical Section
12. Directorate of Training & Licensing (DTL)
13. Directorate of Airspace and Air Navigation Services Standards (ANSS)

== Regional offices ==
DGCA has fourteen Regional Airworthiness Offices (RAO) at Delhi, Mumbai, Chennai, Kolkata, Bangalore, Hyderabad, Kochi, Bhopal, Lucknow, Patna, Bhubaneshwar, Kanpur, Guwahati and Patiala. It has also five Regional Air Safety offices located at Delhi, Mumbai, Chennai, Kolkata and Hyderabad. It has a Regional Research and Development Office located at Bangalore. It has 5 Aircraft Engineering offices located at Delhi, Bengaluru, Hyderabad, Lucknow and Kanpur and a Gliding Centre at Pune.

== Civil Aviation Authority ==
The CAA has been envisaged as an autonomous regulatory body which will replace the DGCA and will meet standards set by the UN's International Civil Aviation Organization (ICAO). The CAA will have separate departments to deal with safety, economic regulation and grievance resolution, as well as a full-fledged environment department. It will also have an independent accident investigation bureau. The Authority will also have the autonomy to recruit staff. Currently, the DGCA is understaffed and does not have any recruitment powers. The CAA will have administrative and financial powers similar to those of the American FAA. These powers will redefine the regulator's role and better equip it to face the challenges of the growing Aviation sector in the country. Employees working with DGCA will be transferred to the CAA.

The estimated cost of establishing the new Authority would be around Rs 11.2 million. The CAA would be self-financing and have a separate fund called the 'Civil Aviation Authority of India Fund' that would finance its entire expenses. It would have a Chairperson, a Director General and 7-9 members appointed by the Central Government. These members will be qualified in the fields of aviation safety, aircraft engineering, flight standard operations, aerodromes, air navigation systems and air space management.

== Air accident investigation ==
Previously the DGCA conducted investigations and gave information to the investigations established by the Court of Inquiry and the Committee Inquiry. A separate investigative agency was established to comply with the Standards And Recommended Practices (SARPs) of the International Civil Aviation Organization (ICAO). Therefore, the Aircraft Accident Investigation Bureau (AAIB) was established in 2011.

== Aviation security ==
In January 1978, the Bureau of Civil Aviation Security (BCAS) was established as a department of the DGCA. As a result of the 1985 bombing of Air India Flight 182, on 1 April 1987, the BCAS became an independent agency of the Ministry of Civil Aviation.

== Aircraft projects ==
- Bharat Swati

== FOI resignation ==
13 Flight Operations Inspectors working with the DGCA have tendered their resignation in a week of May 2015 in protest against the aviation regulator's decision to post them away from their homes in Delhi to Mumbai and Chennai.

== See also ==
- Airline codes
- Aviation in India
- Airport Authority of India
- International Civil Aviation Organization
- Aircraft Accident Investigation Bureau (India)
