= Borstal (disambiguation) =

A borstal or borstal school is a type of juvenile detention centre in India and formerly in the United Kingdom.

Borstal may also refer to:

- Borstal Prison, Kent, England, the institution after which the detention system was named
- Borstal, Rochester, the village in Kent in which the prison was situated
- Borstal Boy (disambiguation), a book by Brendan Behan and its adaptations

== See also ==
- Borstal Breakout, a single by Sham 69
- Boarstall, a village in Buckinghamshire, England
