= Young offender institution =

Type of British prison for juvenile offenders

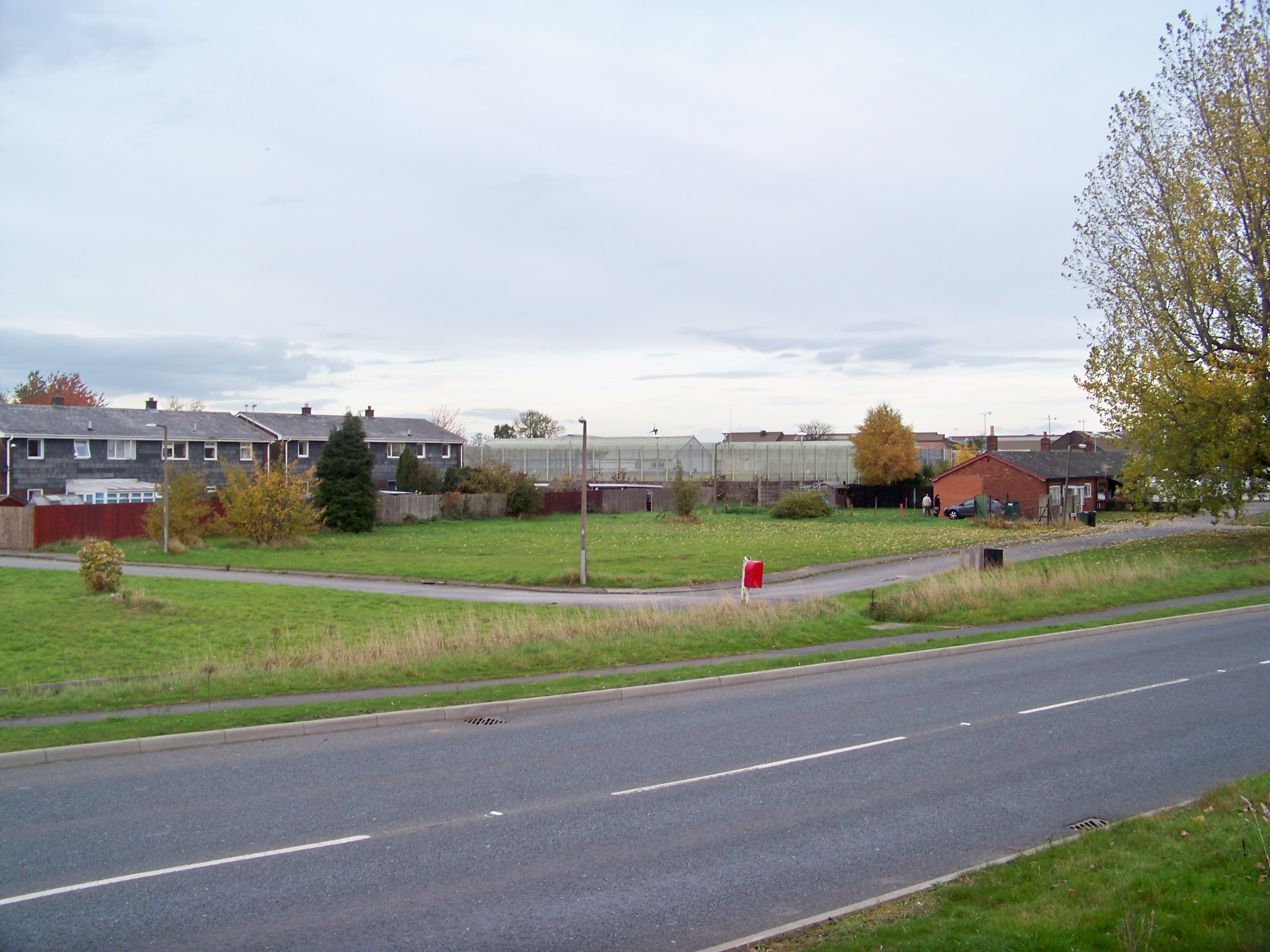
Wetherby Young Offender Institution in West Yorkshire

Young offender institutions (YOI; more formally His Majesty's Young Offender Institutions or HMYOI; Welsh: Sefydliad Troseddwyr Ifanc Ei Fawrhydi) are youth detention centres for offenders between ages 15 to under 21 in Great Britain. These offenders will have received a custodial sentence following criminal offence convictions or may be being held on remand awaiting trial on pending charges.

A young offender institution can accommodate between 60 and 400 young people, with each age group housed in its own wing of between 30 and 60 inmates. Most young offender institutions are run by the national prison service while some are run by private companies on behalf of the prison service.

== Background ==
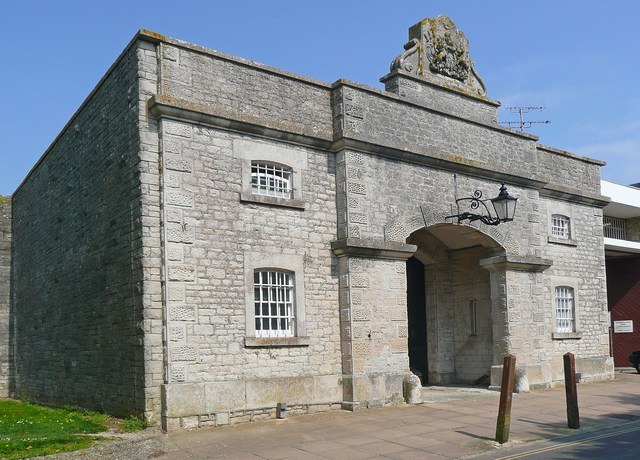
Entrance to the Grove Prison built in 1848, which operated as an adult prison from 1848; a borstal from 1921; and a young offender institution (HM Prison Portland) from 1988.

Young offender institutions were introduced under the Criminal Justice Act 1988, but secure institutions specifically intended for young offenders have existed since the beginning of the 20th century: the first borstal opened at Borstal, Kent in 1902.

The regime of a young offender institution is similar to that of an adult prison. There are slight differences, notably a lower staff-to-offender ratio. Prisoners serving sentences at young offender institutions are expected to participate in at least 25 hours of education per week, aimed at behaviour improvement, practical skill development for post-release and employment preparation. There are also opportunities for prisoners to undertake work in Community Service Volunteer programmes.

== Issues ==
Violence is frequently reported in young offender institutions and staff have been criticised for failing to prevent it. Solitary confinement is often used, with inmates reportedly often confined to cells for up to 21 hours a day and given little tuition or guidance. At all YOIs during a six-month period there were 306 cases of segregation lasting over a week, which is "very high", with contributory factors including gang involvement, insufficient prison staff and a lack of NHS mental health beds.

Recidivism rates are high, with up to three quarters of released offenders re-offending within a year. Offenders undergo assessments on the likeliness of reoffending. This assessment is known as youth level of service.

== List of young offender institutions ==
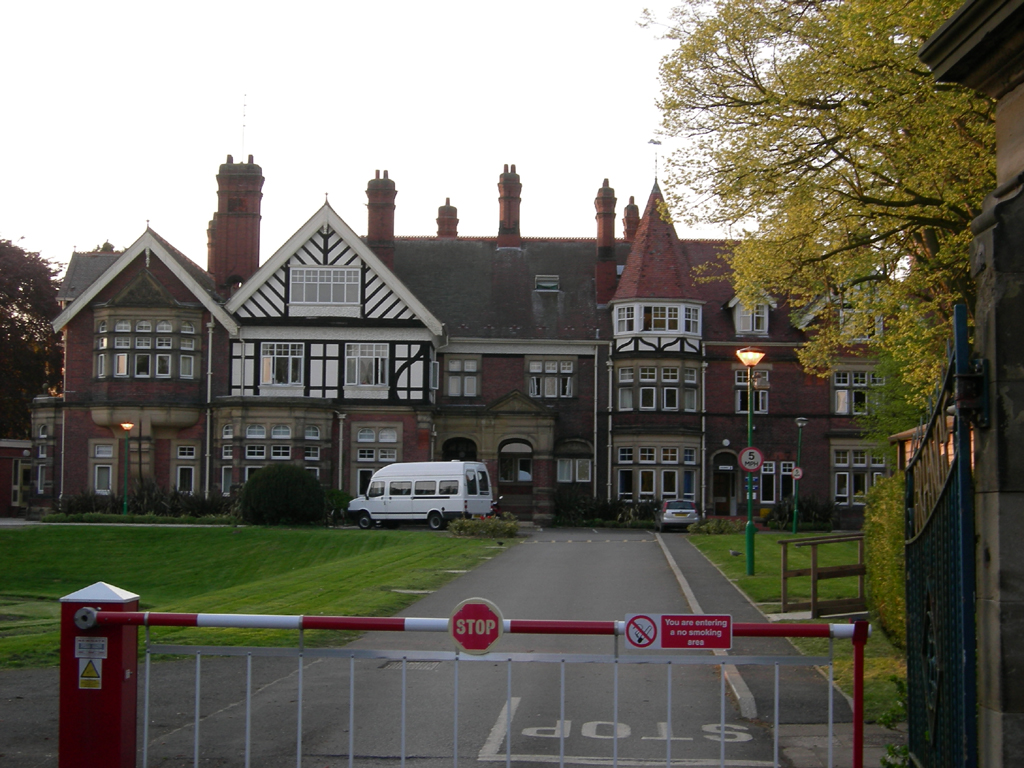
Askham Grange, which is also an open prison for adult female offenders

- HMP & YOI Askham Grange, North Yorkshire, England
- HMP & YOI Brinsford, Staffordshire, England
- HMP & YOI Bronzefield, Surrey, England
- HMP & YOI Chelmsford, Essex, England
- HMYOI Cookham Wood, Kent, England
- HMP & YOI Deerbolt, County Durham, England
- HMP & YOI Drake Hall, Staffordshire, England
- HMP & YOI East Sutton Park, Kent, England
- HMP & YOI Eastwood Park, South Gloucestershire, England
- HMYOI Feltham, London Borough of Hounslow, England
- HMP & YOI Foston Hall, Derbyshire, England
- HMP & YOI Hatfield, South Yorkshire, England
- HMP & YOI High Down, Surrey, England
- HMP & YOI Hindley, Greater Manchester, England
- HMP & YOI Hollesley Bay, Suffolk, England
- HMP & YOI Hull, East Riding of Yorkshire, England
- HMP & YOI Isis, Royal Borough of Greenwich, England
- HMP & YOI Lincoln, Lincolnshire, England
- HMP & YOI Low Newton, County Durham, England
- HMP & YOI Moorland, South Yorkshire, England
- HMP & YOI New Hall, West Yorkshire, England
- HMP & YOI Norwich, Norfolk, England
- HMP & YOI Parc, Mid Glamorgan, Wales
- HMP & YOI Pentonville, London Borough of Islington, England
- HMYOI Polmont, Falkirk, Scotland
- HMP & YOI Portland, Dorset, England
- HMP & YOI Prescoed, Monmouthshire, Wales
- HMP & YOI Rochester, Kent, England
- HMP & YOI Stoke Heath, Shropshire, England
- HMP & YOI Styal, Cheshire, England
- HMP & YOI Swinfen Hall, Staffordshire, England
- HMP & YOI Thorn Cross, Cheshire, England
- HMYOI Werrington, Staffordshire, England
- HMYOI Wetherby, West Yorkshire, England
- HMP & YOI Winchester, Hampshire, England
- HMP & YOI Woodhill, Buckinghamshire, England

There are no HMYOI institutions in Northern Ireland, the only youth detention centre being Woodlands Juvenile Justice Centre in Bangor, County Down.

== See also ==
- His Majesty's Prison Service
- Young offender
- Borstal
- Youth detention centre
- National Association of Remand Homes Superintendents and Matrons
