= Orlando Reade =

British author and academic

Dr Orlando Reade
- Education: University of Cambridge; University of London; Princeton University
- Occupations: Writer; Academic
- Relatives: Arthur Reade (grandfather); Julian Reade (uncle); Dr Patrick Reade (father)
- Writing career
- Subjects: Early modern literature; Political history; Literary criticism
- Notable work: What in Me Is Dark
- Notable awards: Financial Times Books of the Year (2024)

Orlando Reade is a British author and academic known for writing about literature and history. He is the author of What in Me is Dark: The Revolutionary Afterlife of Paradise Lost, a 2024 Financial Times book of the year about the cultural afterlife of Paradise Lost and the legacy of English poet John Milton.

== Education ==
Reade studied English at the University of Cambridge, where he received a BA in English literature in 2009, and at the University of London, where he received an MA in Renaissance Studies in 2011. He subsequently studied at Princeton University, where he finished his PhD in English literature in 2020.

== Career ==
Reade joined Northeastern University – London in 2021 as assistant professor of English. He previously taught for Princeton University, McNally Jackson Books, and the Brooklyn Institute for Social Research.

The five-year period prior to his academic appointment, Reade taught literature in New Jersey prisons as part of the NJ-STEP programme, an experience that directly informed his first book.

== Books ==
- What in Me Is Dark: The Revolutionary Life of Paradise Lost. Jonathan Cape, 2024 (UK); Astra House, 2025 (US).

What in Me is Dark examines how Paradise Lost has influenced political and literary thought, tracing its impact on figures including Thomas Jefferson and Malcolm X.

== Articles ==
Reade has written about politics and culture for publications including the Financial Times, The Guardian, The New Statesman, The Nation, Frieze, The Literary Review, The White Review, Apollo, Jacobin, and Literary Hub. He served as editor at The White Review.

=== Selected Articles ===
- "How Malcolm X Read His Milton". ''Milton Studies'', Vol. 68. Financial Times.
- "How a little-known French literary critic became a bellwether for the US right". Financial Times.
- "Paradise Found". Financial Times.
- "Why is the Right Obsessed with Epic Poetry?". The Nation.
- "Sharing a bed with Edmund White". The New Statesman, June 2025.
- "The Rewarding Mystery of Lynette Yiadom-Boakye". Apollo Magazine.
- "Rules of Attraction". The Literary Review.
- "Princeton Goes to Prison". Literary Hub.
