= Sheelah Ruggles-Brise =

British author and antiquarian

- Born: Sheelah Maud Emily Chichester; 17 February 1878
- Died: 11 March 1953 (aged 75); Arthurstown, County Wexford, Ireland
- Spouses: Essex Reade (m. 1901; d. 1908); Sir Evelyn Ruggles-Brise (m. 1933; d. 1935)
- Children: Arthur Essex Edgeworth Reade Sheelah Violet Edgeworth Reade
- Relatives: Randolph Stewart, 9th Earl of Galloway (grandfather); Harriet Stewart, Countess of Galloway (grandmother); Arthur Chichester, 1st Baron Templemore (grandfather)

Born in Ireland, died at 162 Ebury Street, London.

Sheelah Maud Emily Ruggles-Brise (née Chichester; 1878–1953) was a British author and antiquarian. She is the author of Sealed Bottles (1949), a book study of English glass wine bottles carrying applied seals, it was published by Country Life in London and Charles Scribner's Sons in New York. It's frequently cited in peer-reviewed archaeological literature, including in Post-Medieval Archaeology.

Between at least 1926 and 1933, Reade served as Chairman of the International Council of Girl Scouts and Guides, the predecessor body to the World Association of Girl Guides and Girl Scouts (WAGGGS). In May 1926, in her capacity as chairman, she called on President Coolidge at the White House alongside other Girl Guides leaders attending the annual convention in New York.

== Family ==
Sheelah was the daughter of Hon. Francis Algernon James Chichester son of Arthur Herbet Chichester, 1st Baron Templemore and Lady Emily Octavia Stewart, daughter of Randolph Stewart, 9th Earl of Galloway.

She married Essex Reade agent of Baring Brothers, on 11 April 1901. They had two children, Arthur Essex Edgeworth Reade DSO MC, who served in the Special Operations Executive during the Second World War; and Sheelah Violet Edgeworth Reade, who married Captain Lord Alastair Mungo Graham, son of Douglas Graham, 5th Duke of Montrose.

Following Essex Reade's death in 1908, she married Sir Evelyn Ruggles-Brise KCB, founder of the Borstal system, on 6 June 1933.

== Publications ==
- Sealed Bottles. Country Life Ltd., London; Charles Scribner's Sons, New York, 1949.
