= The Cook's Oracle =

The Cook's Oracle may refer to:

- A cookbook published in 1817 by William Kitchiner
- A searchable database of cookbooks created by Barbara Ketcham Wheaton
