= What in Me Is Dark =

2024 book by Orlando Reade

- Author: Orlando Reade
- Subject: Paradise Lost; John Milton; Literary criticism; Political history
- Genre: Literary nonfiction
- Publisher: Jonathan Cape (UK); Astra House (US)
- Publication date: 2024 (UK); 10 December 2024 (US)
- ISBN: 978-1-66260-340-2

What in Me Is Dark: The Revolutionary Afterlife of Paradise Lost is a work of literary nonfiction by British author Orlando Reade, released in 2024. It was published by Jonathan Cape in the United Kingdom and Astra House in the United States. The book breaks down how John Milton's epic Paradise Lost contributed to political and literary thought across four centuries, pointing to its impact on twelve readers including Thomas Jefferson, Malcolm X, George Eliot, Hannah Arendt, C. L. R. James and Virginia Woolf. It was named a Financial Times Book of the Year for 2024.

== Background ==
Reade credits his experience teaching Paradise Lost to incarcerated students in New Jersey prisons while a part of the NJ-STEP prison education programme, as an experience that directly informed the book's final chapter, which puts a lens on his own prison students as the twelfth group of readers. The book originated in part from his doctoral dissertation at Princeton University, where he received his PhD in English Literature in 2020.

== Content ==
The book is literarily structured around twelve readers of Paradise Lost, each of whom have engaged with the poem in the context of a political struggle. Reade examines how the poem was read by people involved in struggles against tyranny, slavery, colonialism, gender inequality and capitalist exploitation. These twelve readers include Thomas Jefferson, Malcolm X, George Eliot, Hannah Arendt, C. L. R. James, Virginia Woolf, Baron de Vastey (who summoned the poem in Haiti's struggle against colonial rule), and Reade's own prison students.

The book also provides a reading of Paradise Lost itself, exploring how Milton came to create the epic poem and providing an account of its radical legacy throughout history. A recurring theme is the figure of Satan in the poem, whom William Blake argued Milton subconsciously preferred to God, and whose depiction as an individual asserting freedom against a dominating authority has helped make the poem a repeated resource for revolutionary thought.

== Reception ==
What in Me Is Dark received positive reviews across major publications upon publication in 2024. The Financial Times named it a Book of the Year. The Guardian named it Book of the Day, describing it as "lively and humane" and praising Reade's "enthusiasm and curiosity." Joe Moshenska, writing in The Guardian, described it as "a thoughtful, wide-ranging and astute book" that "strikes a difficult and deft balance" between hagiography and iconoclasm. The New Statesman called it "clever, wide-ranging, witty and sardonic." Andrea Brady, writing in the Times Literary Supplement, described it as "concise and lively" and praised Reade for making "an eloquent case for the continuing vitality of Paradise Lost." Publishers Weekly gave it a starred review, describing it as "an excellent debut study" whose "edifying analysis testifies to the enduring power of literature." The Big Issue called it "an incredible, pulsing reappraisal."

== See also ==
- Paradise Lost
- John Milton
