= Wetherby Young Offender Institution =

Young offender institution in West Yorkshire, England

Coordinates: 53.9356°N 1.3681°W

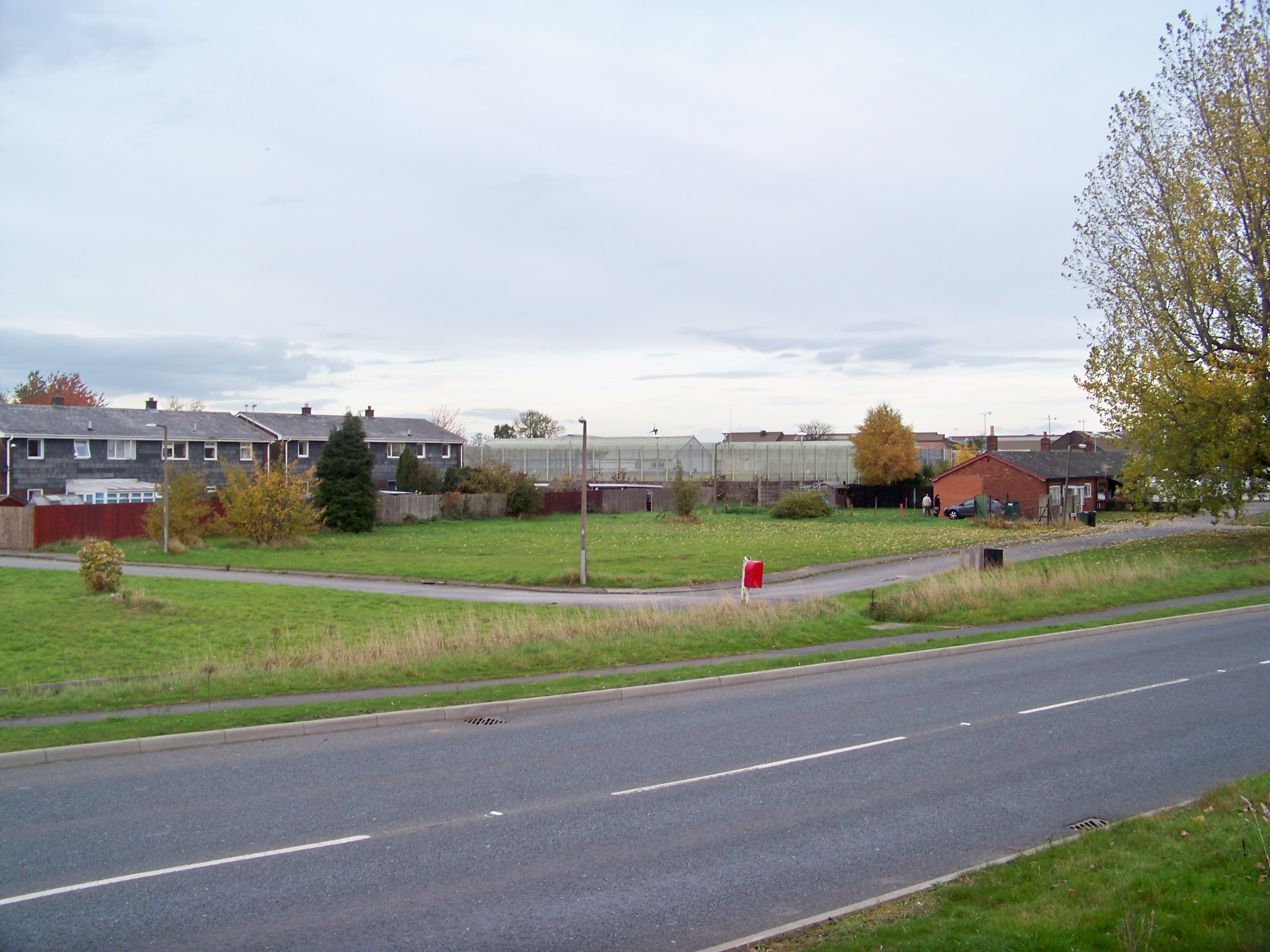
- Wetherby YOI and prison houses adjacent
- Interactive map of Wetherby Young Offender Institution
- Location: Wetherby, West Yorkshire
- Security class: Juvenile Males
- Capacity: 266
- Population: 165 (Dec 2023)
- Opened: 1958
- Former name: HM Prison Wetherby
- Managed by: His Majesty's Prison and Probation Service
- Governor: Mark Scott
- Website: https://www.gov.uk/guidance/wetherby-yoi

Wetherby Young Offender Institution is a male juvenile prison, located in Wetherby, West Yorkshire, England. The YOI is operated by His Majesty's Prison Service.

== History ==
Formerly a Naval Base, HMS Ceres, Wetherby was introduced into the Prison System in 1958 as a Borstal. Since that time there have been many changes in its role from an open Youth Custody Centre, to a closed Youth Custody Centre, to its current role as a dedicated Male Juvenile Prison housing inmates aged between 15 and 17 years.

It houses offenders who are from Humberside, North, South and West Yorkshire and parts of Lancashire and Greater Manchester. Its functional capacity is 276 detainees, however, the Ministry of Justice list the operational capacity as being 336 detainees.

In February 2016, it was revealed that all of the detainees were on lockdown due to rising levels of violence against staff and other detainees. The unrest continued for two months and culminated in a Prison Officer being stabbed.

== The prison today ==
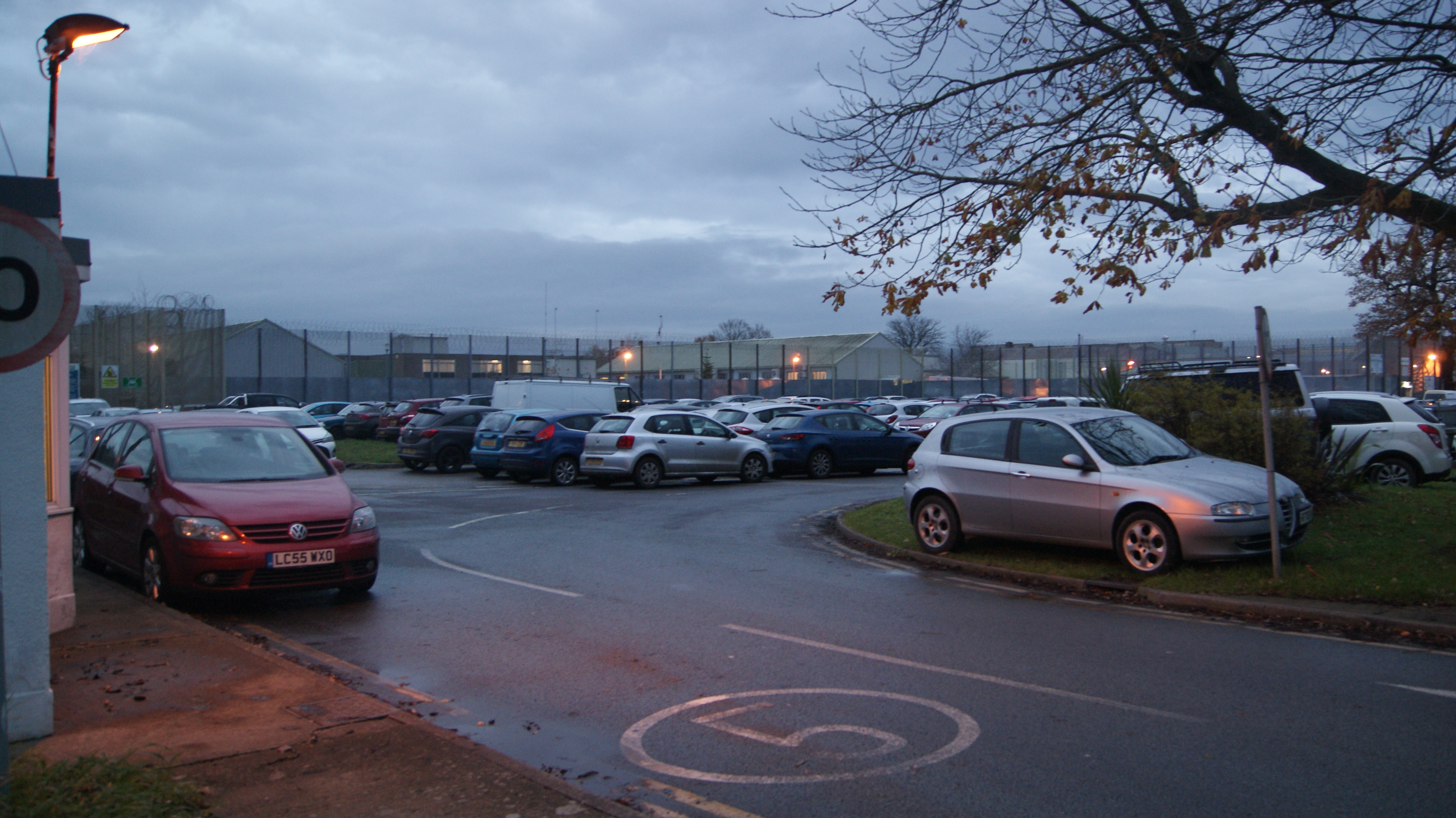
The Institution in 2017

All living accommodation in the prison is in single occupancy cells. The living accommodation is split into 6 living units (Anson, Benbow, Collingwood, Drake, Exmouth & Frobisher) housing 60 trainees in each. There are two brick-built units that were built in the 1970s and 4 "quick-build" ready-to-use units that were erected in 1997. An additional self-contained unit for vulnerable boys in custody has officially opened in 2009 by the Youth Justice Board, the Keppel Unit holds up to 48 boys aged 15–17, offering enhanced support including individual care plans, extended enrichment opportunities exclusive to Keppel Unit; such as the weekly 'Park Run', where the trainees are offered the chance to stroll or compete for lap times around the pond and surrounding recreational pitches, and small animals where the trainees can handle and assist in the caring of rabbits & the various breeds of duck. The enhanced supervision unit (ESU), Napier, was opened in 2019 able to provide additional care and support for 6 young males.

Wetherby's Education Programme (offered on a half-time basis) is provided by Novus. Courses are provided in a variety of subjects and individual timetables are developed to meet the trainees' needs in conjunction with the sentence planning process. The establishment has a Chaplaincy Team for both staff and trainees. There are weekly services, an Ecumenical Service for Church of England and other Free Churches, a Roman Catholic service as well as Muslim prayers and non-exclusive prayer sessions for those of other faiths. A team of three full-time chaplains, as well as part-time and sessional chaplains meet the needs of trainees and staff as well as providing extracurricular group sessions to assist in socialisation opportunity for the trainees. The prison has a small Health Care Centre which is run by nursing staff who provide 24-hour medical cover. A doctor attends the establishment in the mornings.

Refreshments are available to visitors and prisoners in the visits room during visiting hours and vending machines are also available.

== Cadet unit ==
Wetherby is home to the United Kingdom's only behind-bars army cadet unit. It aims to allow the cadets to decouple from the social circles that caused them to offend and offers basic life and organisational skills as found in the British Army.

== Notable inmates ==
- Will Cornick, was initially jailed at Wetherby for the murder of his schoolteacher but was later transferred to HM Prison Hindley due to fears for his safety.
