= Arthur Reade =

British labour movement activist

Major Arthur Essex Edgeworth Reade DSO, MC
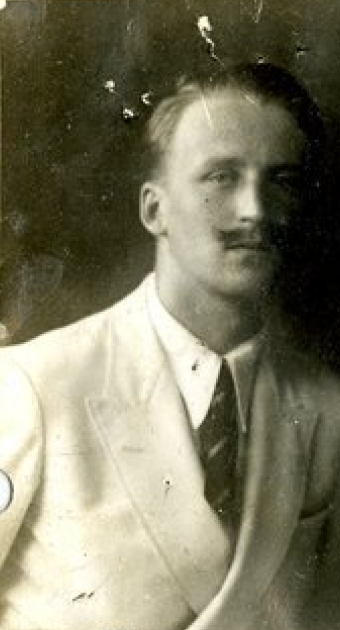
- Died: 12 December 1971 (aged 69); St Clement, Jersey
- Children: Julian Reade; Patrick Reade; Viola Mary Edgeworth Reade; Antony Reade
- Allegiance: United Kingdom
- Branch: British Army
- Service years: 1940 – 1945
- Rank: Major
- Units: Special Operations Executive; Intelligence Corps
- Conflicts: World War II
- Awards: Distinguished Service Order; Military Cross; Serving Brother, Order of St John
- Other work: Barrister, Journalist, Magistrate

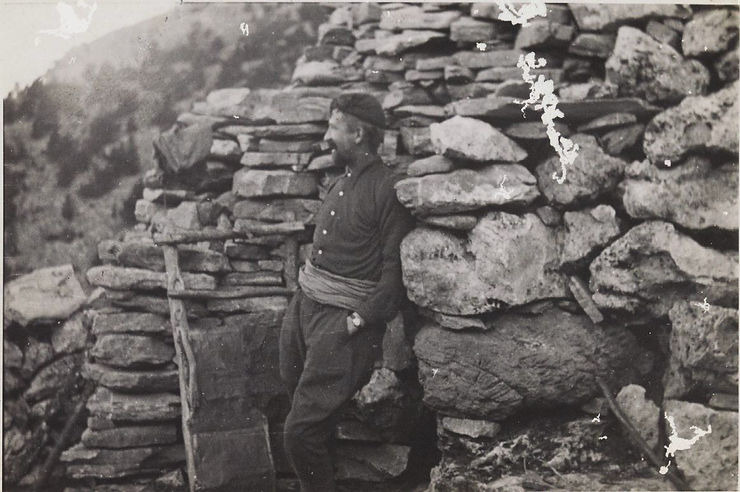
Arthur Reade in the mountains of Crete in 1943. 4 miles from the nearest village of Kares that sits 2,000 feet below

Arthur Essex Edgeworth Reade (22 January 1902 – 12 December 1971) was a British barrister, Special Operations Executive officer and labour movement activist, whose affiliations ranged from Trotskyism to the National Labour Organisation. He is the father of Assyriologist Julian Reade, Illustrator Patrick Reade and son of merchant banker Essex Reade and Author Sheelah Ruggles-Brise

== Early life ==
Born in the Piccadilly area of London to Essex Reade and Sheelah Maud Emily Chichester, Reade was educated at Gibbs Preparatory School, Stonehouse Preparatory School, and Eton College, where his politics were influenced by the Earl De La Warr. In 1919/20, he attended the University of Strasbourg, then briefly became a journalist, working for the Daily Mail. He returned to the UK, studying history at Worcester College, Oxford, where he was active in the Labour Club and the Socialist Society, and edited The New Oxford journal.

Following the death of his father in 1908, his mother later married Sir Evelyn Ruggles-Brise KCB, Founder of the Borstal system, in 1933

== Political career ==
In 1921, Reade joined the Communist Party of Great Britain (CPGB), and he launched The Free Oxford, an influential communist journal. Contributors to Free Oxford included Edward Carpenter, Louis Golding, A. E. Coppard, Edgell Rickword and Richard Hughes. Reade was expelled from the university in December, by the Vice-Chancellor, Lewis Richard Farnell. Farnell objected to Reade's publishing of Free Oxford, and he accused Reade of "advocating the methods of the Red Terror." Reade received widespread sympathy in the press, but was not readmitted, and focused on journalism, especially for the Workers' Weekly and Labour Monthly, working closely with Rajani Palme Dutt. In 1924, he became business manager of the Labour Monthly, and also served on the London District Committee of the CPGB.

Reade was a supporter of Trotsky. He was the first British communist to describe himself as a Trotskyist, and from late 1924 this led him to fall out of favour in the CPGB. He was removed from his party posts, and went travelling in Greece and the Balkans. He returned to the UK in 1928, resigning from the CPGB and joining the Labour Party. He stood for his new party in Abingdon at the 1929 UK general election, taking third place, with 12.5% of the vote.

In 1930, Reade joined the Inner Temple and studied to become a barrister. He resigned from the Labour Party in 1931, briefly joining the New Party, but then rejoined Labour. By 1936, he was disappointed with Labour's opposition to rearmament, and defected to the National Labour Organisation. He continued to regard himself as a supporter of Trotsky, and wrote in opposition to the Moscow Trials. He was adopted as the party's Prospective Parliamentary Candidate for Bristol East, but no election was held until 1945, by which time he had left politics.

== Military service ==
In 1940, Reade joined the British Army, and the following year was appointed to the Special Operations Executive, becoming its head of administration.

In November 1942 he was sent on a mission with fellow SOE agent with Xan Fielding to blow up HMS York which was lying partly submerged in Suda Bay before the Germans could relaunch it. The mission was considered suicidal and he was only supplied with faulty explosives, so the mission was aborted, and he was extracted in May 1943. Reade was sent back to England, but cleared of any errors, and instead promoted to major.

For his wartime service Reade was appointed to the Distinguished Service Order and awarded the Military Cross. In January 1947 he was admitted as a Serving Brother of the Order of St John.

== Post-war career ==
After the war, Reade worked in Germany translating the German Penal Code into English and once that was finished he worked for the War Crimes Commission in Germany, concentrating on war crimes committed in Northeast Europe. In 1950, he then became a resident magistrate in Kenya, moving to Cyprus in 1953 where he was the island's only English- and Greek-speaking lawyer. He retired in 1963, moving to Jersey, and died eight years later.
