= Roger Neighbour =

British general practitioner and medical author

Roger Neighbour OBE
- Born: 1947 (age 78–79)
- Occupation: General Practitioner
- Writing career
- Period: 1987-present
- Subjects: General practice Medical Education
- Notable awards: OBE

Roger Harvey Neighbour (born 1947) is a British general practitioner and author. He was educated at King's College, Cambridge and St Thomas’ Hospital in London and was active as a GP in Hertfordshire from 1974 to 2003. He is best known for The Inner Consultation (1987), described as "one of the very few contemporary medical classics" in general practice.

== Career ==
Neighbour was a practitioner at Abbots Langley, Hertfordshire, from 1974 to 2003. He was programme director for the Watford Vocational Training Scheme, and later an examiner for MRCGP examination in 1984, serving for twenty years. He was appointed the title of Convenor of the Panel of Examiners from 1997 to 2002.

In 2003, he became President of the Royal College of General Practitioners, serving until 2006. He has since held a position as a visiting professor of Medical Education at Brunel Medical School.

In 2011, he was appointed OBE for significant services to Medical Education.

== Works ==
=== Books ===
- The Inner Consultation: How to Develop an Effective and Intuitive Consulting Style. Illustrated by Patrick Reade. MTP Press. 1987.
- The Inner Apprentice: An Awareness-Centred Approach to Vocational Training for General Practice. Illustrated by Patrick Reade. Petroc Press. 1992.
- I'm Too Hot Now: Writings at the Edge of Medicine. CRC Press. 2005. ISBN 9781315342559.
- The Inner Physician: Why and How to Practice 'Big Picture Medicine. Royal College of General Practitioners. 2016. ISBN 978-0850844115.
- Consulting in a Nutshell. CRC Press. 2021. ISBN 9780367456955.
