= Wow-Wow sauce =

Sauce

Wow-Wow Sauce (sometimes referred to as Bow wow sauce) is a sauce for which the first known recipe was published by William Kitchiner of London in 1817. It contains port, wine vinegar, parsley, pickled cucumbers or pickled walnuts, English mustard and mushroom ketchup in a base of beef stock, flour and butter. A recipe appears in Enquire Within Upon Everything (88th edition, 1894).

It is parodied as a sauce of the same name in the Discworld novels of Terry Pratchett, in which ingredients including sulfur and saltpetre render it highly explosive. A variant of the above real-world recipe is published in The Discworld Companion and Nanny Ogg's Cookbook.
