= Murder of Ann Maguire =

Murder of schoolteacher in Leeds, United Kingdom

- Location: 53.7972°N 1.4847°W; Corpus Christi Catholic College, Halton Moor, Leeds, West Yorkshire, England
- Date: 28 April 2014; 12 years ago
- Target: Ann Maguire and two other teachers
- Attack type: Murder by stabbing
- Weapon: Knife
- Deaths: 1
- Victim: Ann Maguire
- Perpetrator: William Cornick
- Defender: Susan Francis
- Motive: Hatred
- Verdict: Guilty
- Convictions: 1 count of murder

On 28 April 2014, 61-year-old teacher Ann Maguire (5 April 1953 – 28 April 2014) was stabbed to death while teaching a Spanish lesson at Corpus Christi Catholic College in Halton Moor, Leeds, England. The perpetrator, William "Will" Cornick, who was 15 years old when he committed the murder, was sentenced to life with a minimum of 20 years at Leeds Crown Court on 3 November 2014.

== Victim ==
Ann Maguire (née Connor) was aged 61 when she was murdered. She and her husband of 37 years, Donald, had two grown daughters, the younger of whom is Royal Ballet soloist Emma Maguire. She had spent her entire working life at Corpus Christi Catholic College, having taught there for 40 years, and was due to retire in five months. Her funeral service was held at the Church of the Immaculate Heart of Mary on 16 May 2014.

Among those paying tribute to Maguire were Pope Francis, Prime Minister David Cameron, and Frances Lawrence, widow of London headteacher Philip Lawrence who was murdered in 1995.

Author Anthony McGowan had been a pupil of Maguire's at Corpus Christi in the 1970s. He wrote an article about her in the Telegraph in which he said:

"What I remember most about her was her determination to get the best from us, to put into our heads what we needed to get through, to get by. That caring, that intensity, could at times spill over into fierceness, goaded by some jackass, or when she came across bullying or unkindess in others. But it isn’t the fierceness that I remember when I think of her. I think of her face, always on the verge of a smile. Her consideration. The way she listened when you spoke to her, and tried to answer, rather than fob you off. I remember her kindness and consideration for me."

An Educational Trust offering bursaries in artistic subjects was set up in her name.

== Perpetrator ==
Will Cornick
- Mugshot of Cornick, taken by West Yorkshire Police
- Born: William Cornick; 26 June 1998 (age 28); Leeds, West Yorkshire, England
- Occupation: Student
- Height: 6 ft 2 in (1.88 m)
- Status: Incarcerated
- Motive: Hatred
- Criminal charge: Murder
- Penalty: Life with minimum of 20 years

Details
- Victims: Ann Maguire
- Date: 28 April 2014
- Locations: Corpus Christi Catholic College, Halton Moor, Leeds
- Targets: Mrs. Maguire, a pregnant teacher, and another teacher
- Killed: 1
- Weapon: Knife
- Date apprehended: 28 April 2014

Will Cornick's parents were separated, yet both were described as supportive. He joined Corpus Christi in Year 7. His former Head of Year described him as polite and with 100% attendance. Prior to the murder, he had only five incidents of misbehaviour in four-and-a-half years at the school, and no criminal record. Classmates described him as academically gifted, and unlikely to cause trouble.

A personality change in Cornick had been noted following a collapse on holiday in Cornwall, after which he was diagnosed with diabetes. He had briefly self-harmed due to the condition. In 2013, he was upset when he learned that he would not be able to join the Army due to his diabetes. At Christmas that year, he allegedly sent a Facebook message to a friend in which he talked about "brutally murdering" Maguire.

== Murder ==
Cornick admitted to psychiatrists that he had been planning the murder, and intended to do it four days earlier. Cornick, who had a "deep seated grudge" against Ann Maguire, had also put out a Facebook message to his friends to see if any of them would murder Maguire for him for a payment of £10.

On 28 April 2014, Cornick attended lessons as normal. After morning break, he went to the top floor for his Spanish lesson. Half way through the lesson, he stabbed Maguire seven times in the back and neck with a 21 cm (8.3 in) knife. One cut straight through her jugular vein. He then chased her into the corridor where Susan Francis, Head of Languages, alerted by screams, ran to help her. She separated and shielded Maguire from Cornick. Francis got Maguire away into another room where she held the door shut to keep Cornick out. Cornick then returned to his class and told a friend that it was a shame that he had not killed Maguire.

Cornick had brought a bottle of whisky to "celebrate" and admitted he planned to kill two other teachers.

== Legal proceedings ==
On his arrest, Cornick was detained at Wetherby Young Offenders Institution near Leeds, but due to concerns for his safety he was transferred to HM Prison Hindley near Wigan.

Under British law, although it was illegal to name or identify Cornick during his trial due to him being a minor, it was legal to name him before the trial began. The tabloid newspaper The Sun named him the day following the murder.

Psychiatrists said that Cornick possessed "a gross lack of empathy for his victim and a degree of callousness rarely seen in clinical practice" and that he "presents a risk of serious harm to the public and that this risk is present for the foreseeable future. The risk is of grave homicidal violence and this could easily involve the use of a weapon. The risk is immediate and unpredictable and could cause serious and lethal injury." He was imprisoned at Leeds Crown Court for a minimum of 20 years.

Mr Justice Coulson lifted the restrictions on naming Cornick, saying that the action would have a "clear deterrent effect". Cornick's defence lawyer, Richard Wright, argued that this would be illegal under Article 2 of the European Convention on Human Rights owing to immediate threat to his life, which the judge countered with Article 10, freedom of expression.

In January 2015, Cornick lost an appeal against his sentence.

In November 2017, an inquest was held into Maguire's death. The inquest was supported by Maguire's family, but resisted by West Yorkshire Police, Corpus Christi School, and Leeds City Council. The inquest questioned why Cornick's peers had not reported that he planned to kill Maguire, nor said anything when he brought a knife to school. It returned a verdict of unlawful killing, and found that opportunities to prevent the murder were missed.

== See also ==
- Murder of Philip Lawrence
- Sharon Carr – Britain's youngest female murderer who, aged only 12, stabbed a student at her school in 1994
- Murder of Agnès Lassalle, murder of a Spanish schoolteacher in France
