= Patrick Reade =

British doctor, illustrator and journalist

Dr Patrick Reade
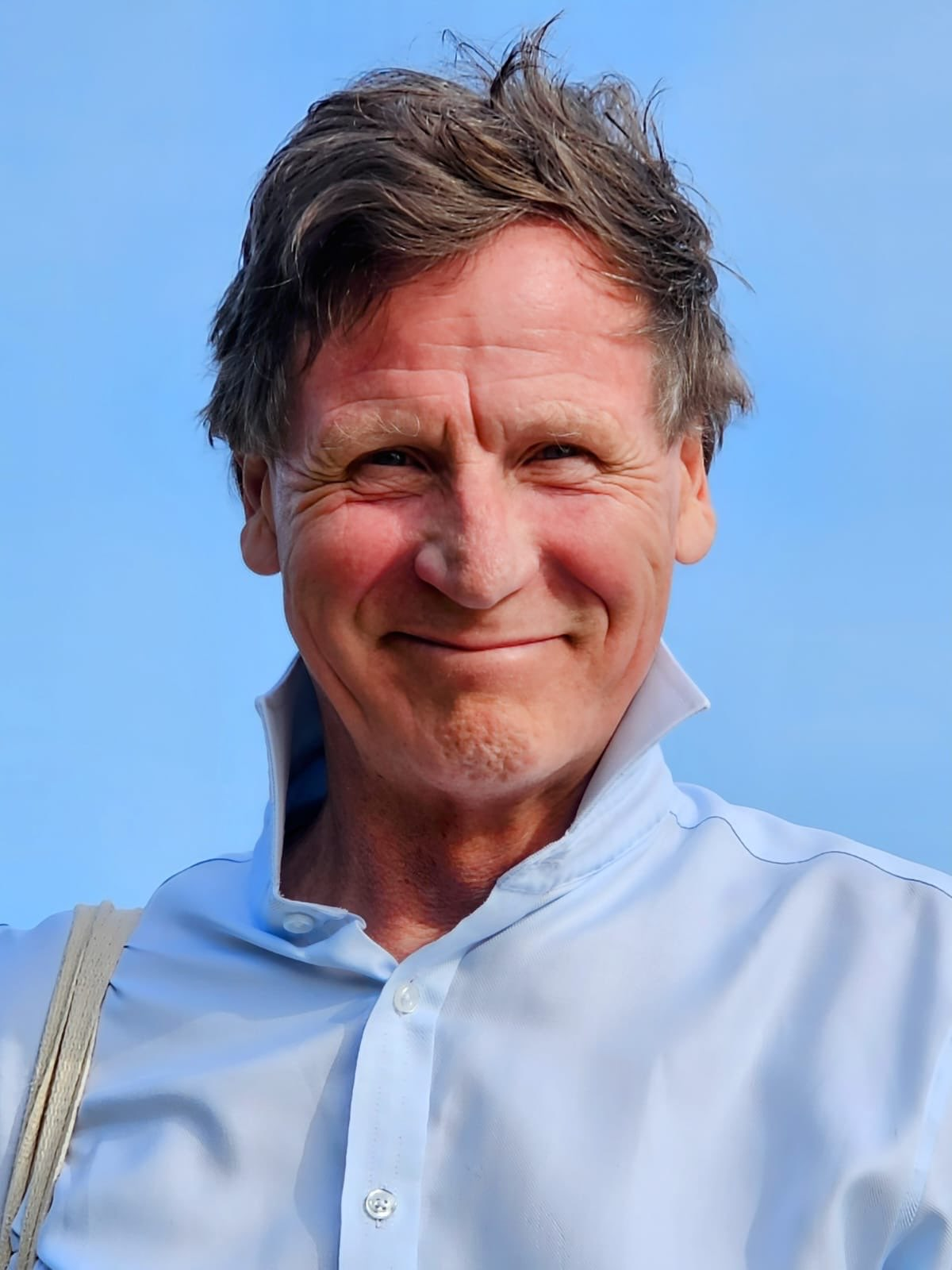
- Born: Evelyn Patrick Edgeworth Reade; 26 June 1952
- Education: Victoria College, Jersey; Cheltenham College
- Alma mater: Christ's College Cambridge
- Notable work: The Inner Consultation
- Children: Orlando Reade; Xander Reade; Felix Reade; Zenobe Reade
- Parent: Arthur Reade
- Relatives: Julian Reade

Dr Evelyn Patrick Edgeworth Reade is a British general practitioner, illustrator and journalist. He is best known for his illustrations in Roger Neighbour's book: The Inner Consultation (1987), described as "one of the very few contemporary medical classics" in general practice. He is the son of Arthur Reade and the brother of Julian Reade.

Reade was educated at Victoria College, Jersey, Cheltenham College and Christ's College, Cambridge.

In 1977 Reade worked as a journalist at the Newcastle Journal before later working at The Independent writing obituaries for notable figures including Patrick Leigh Fermor with whom his family had a longstanding personal connection.

== Publications ==
=== Books ===
- The Inner Consultation: How to Develop an Effective and Intuitive Consulting Style. Illustrated by Patrick Reade. MTP Press 1987
- The Inner Apprentice: An Awareness-Centered Approach to Vocational Training for General Practice. Illustrated by Patrick Reade. Petroc Press 1992

=== Essays ===
- "Katyuli Lloyd and Patrick Reade on the Folio Society edition of Mani and Roumeli". The Philhellene, Issue 9. Patrick Leigh Fermor Society, September 2017.
- "The power of impotence and private means". Patrick Reade The Spectator 1990

=== Selected obituaries ===
- Patrick Leigh Fermor
- Fredda Brilliant
- Marjorie Baker
- Gerry Martin
- Dr Reginald Saxton
- Ian Graham
