= Pickled walnuts =

Traditional English pickle made from walnuts

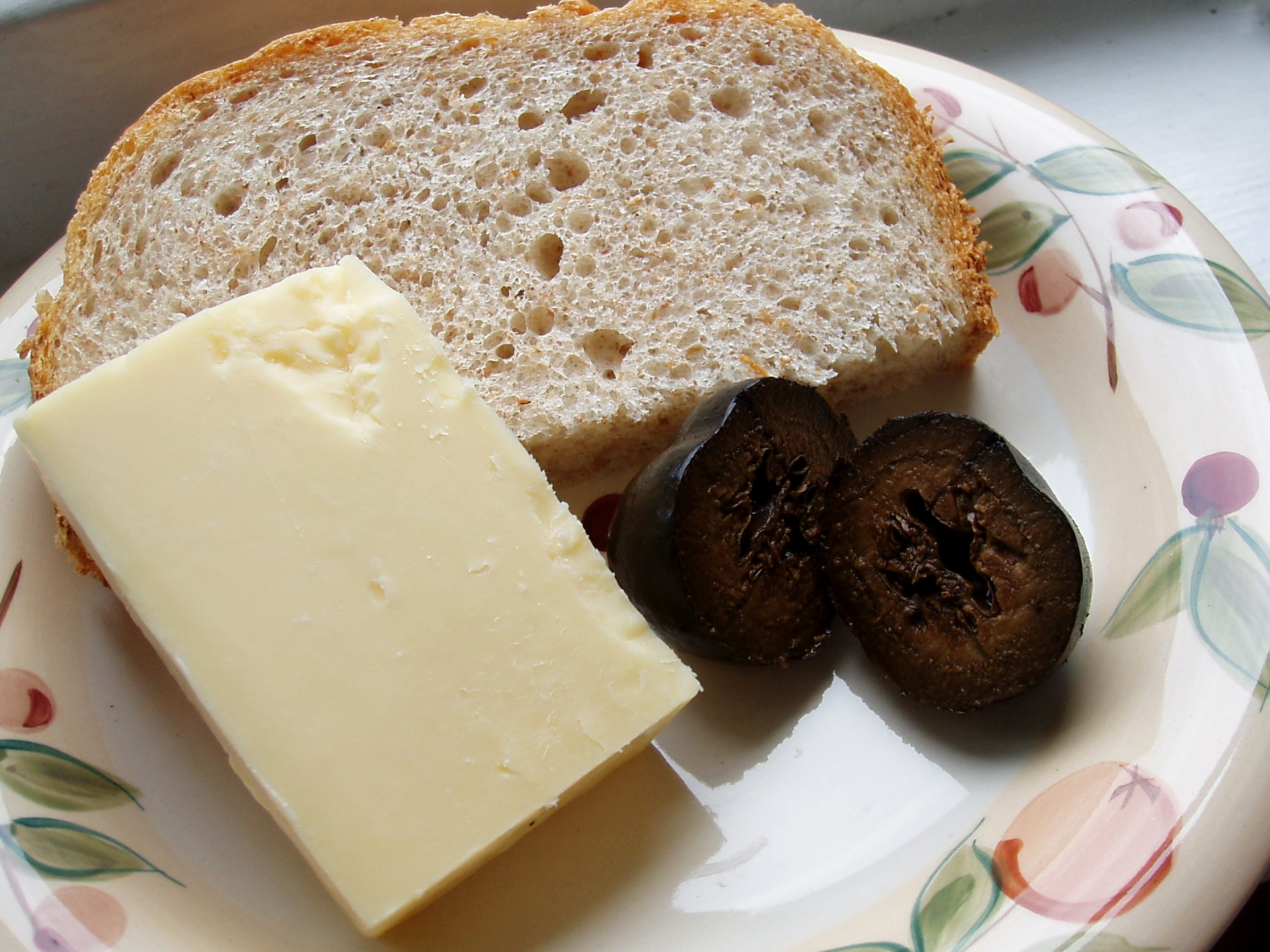
Pickled walnuts served with bread and cheese

Pickled walnuts are a traditional English pickle, made from walnuts. They are typically eaten with cold turkey or ham, as well as blue cheese. There is a reference to "a mutton chop and a pickled walnut" in The Pickwick Papers by Charles Dickens and a mention in Evelyn Waugh’s Brideshead Revisited.

The process for preparing pickled walnuts takes a little more than a week. The green walnuts are brined before they are pickled. The brining time helps with preservation and removes some of the bitterness in the unripe walnuts.

== History ==
Pickled walnuts have been a delicacy in England since at least the early 18th century. They were mentioned in several literary works.

The botanist Richard Bradley describes pickled walnuts in his 1728 book The Country Housewife and Lady's Director,

The beginning of this Month is the time to pickle Walnuts, for then the Walnuts have not began [sic] to shell, and moreover are not so bitter nor hollow as they will be afterwards; they will now be full flesh'd, and you will have no Loss. The following Method I learnt from Mr. Foord, a curious Gentleman of Buckingham, and has been experienced to be the best way. There is one thing indeed which must be regarded in this Pickle, which is, that every one does not love the Taste of Onion or Garlick; but that may be omitted as we please, only supplying the place with Ginger. [continues with actual recipe]

The Compleat Housewife (London, 1727) gives a recipe for "Another Way to pickle Walnuts". They are first submerged in vinegar for around two months, then boiled in a solution of high-quality vinegar with flavourings: dill seeds, whole nutmeg, peppercorns, mace and ginger root. The walnuts and pickle are poured boiling into a crock until the mixture has cooled. The nuts are then transferred to a gallipot containing a large clove-studded garlic clove as well as mustard seeds with spices, and covered with vine leaves over which the pickling liquid is poured.

Pickled walnuts are still commonly eaten in England, particularly at Christmas served with an English blue cheese such as Stilton. They are also used in recipes, commonly cooked in beef dishes.

== References in fiction ==
In Chapter 49 of his novel The Pickwick Papers, published in 1836, Charles Dickens writes:

However, there he lay, and I have heard my uncle say, many a time, that the man said who picked him up that he was smiling as merrily as if he had tumbled out for a treat, and that after they had bled him, the first faint glimmerings of returning animation, were his jumping up in bed, bursting out into a loud laugh, kissing the young woman who held the basin, and demanding a mutton chop and a pickled walnut. He was very fond of pickled walnuts, gentlemen. He said he always found that, taken without vinegar, they relished the beer.

Pickled walnuts are also mentioned in Brideshead Revisited (1945) by Evelyn Waugh. In Book 1, Chapter 1, Waugh writes,

Presently we drove on and in another hour were hungry. We stopped at an inn, which was half farm also, and ate eggs and bacon, pickled walnuts and cheese, and drank our beer in a sunless parlour where an old clock ticked in the shadows and a cat slept by the empty grate.

== Production ==
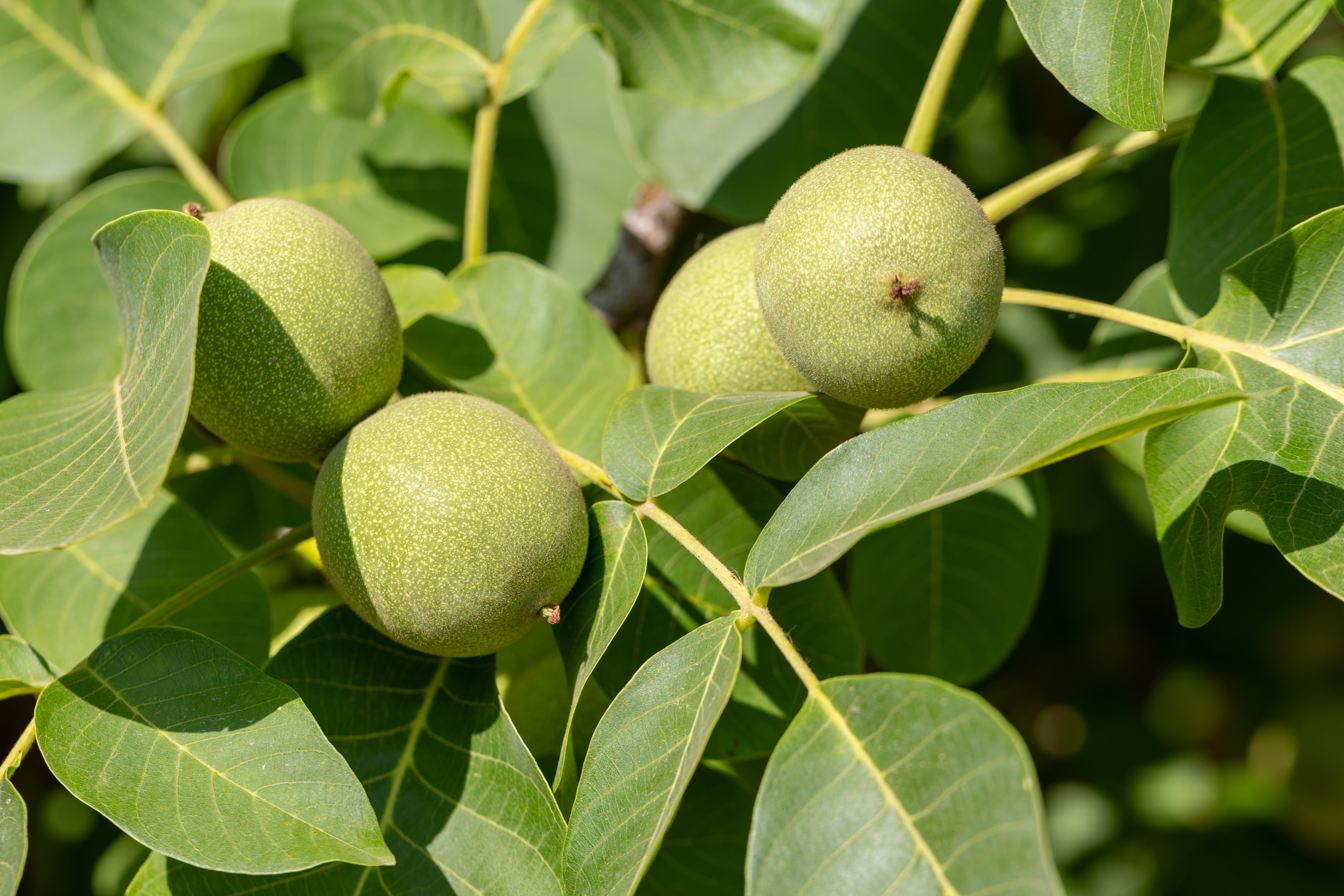
Walnut fruits

Pickled walnuts are made from the fruit of both common walnut tree varieties: Juglans regia, the Persian, royal, English or common walnut, and Juglans nigra, the black or American walnut.

The first stage is to pick the walnuts whilst they are still green and before the shells have set. Most recipes say in Britain that late June is about the best time to pick them; use of rubber gloves is recommended to protect the skin. The soft walnuts are punctured with a fork and soaked in brine (salt water) for at least ten days. The walnuts are then drained and left to dry in the air. Soaking the walnuts in brine causes a chemical reaction to take place and the walnuts turn dark brown to black in colour when exposed to sunlight. The now-black walnuts are then placed into jars and a pickling solution poured over them. This can vary from a straightforward pickling vinegar to a solution containing spices and sugar. The walnuts are sealed and then left in the jars for anywhere between five days and eight weeks depending on which recipe is followed.

== See also ==
- Wow-Wow sauce
- Walnut soup – Soup with walnuts as a main ingredient

== Bibliography ==
- Bradley, Prof R (1729). The country Housewife and Lady's Director. D Browne, at the Black Swan without Temple Bar.
- Dickens, Charles (1836). Pickwick Papers.
- Waugh, Evelyn (1945). Brideshead Revisited. Boston, Little, Brown.
- Heath, Ambrose (Ed); Blanche Anding; Joan Robins (1957). Modern Home Cookery in Pictures. Odhams Press, London.
