= HM Prison Rochester =

Young Offenders Institution in Kent, England

Coordinates: 51°22′12″N 0°29′19″E

HMP Rochester
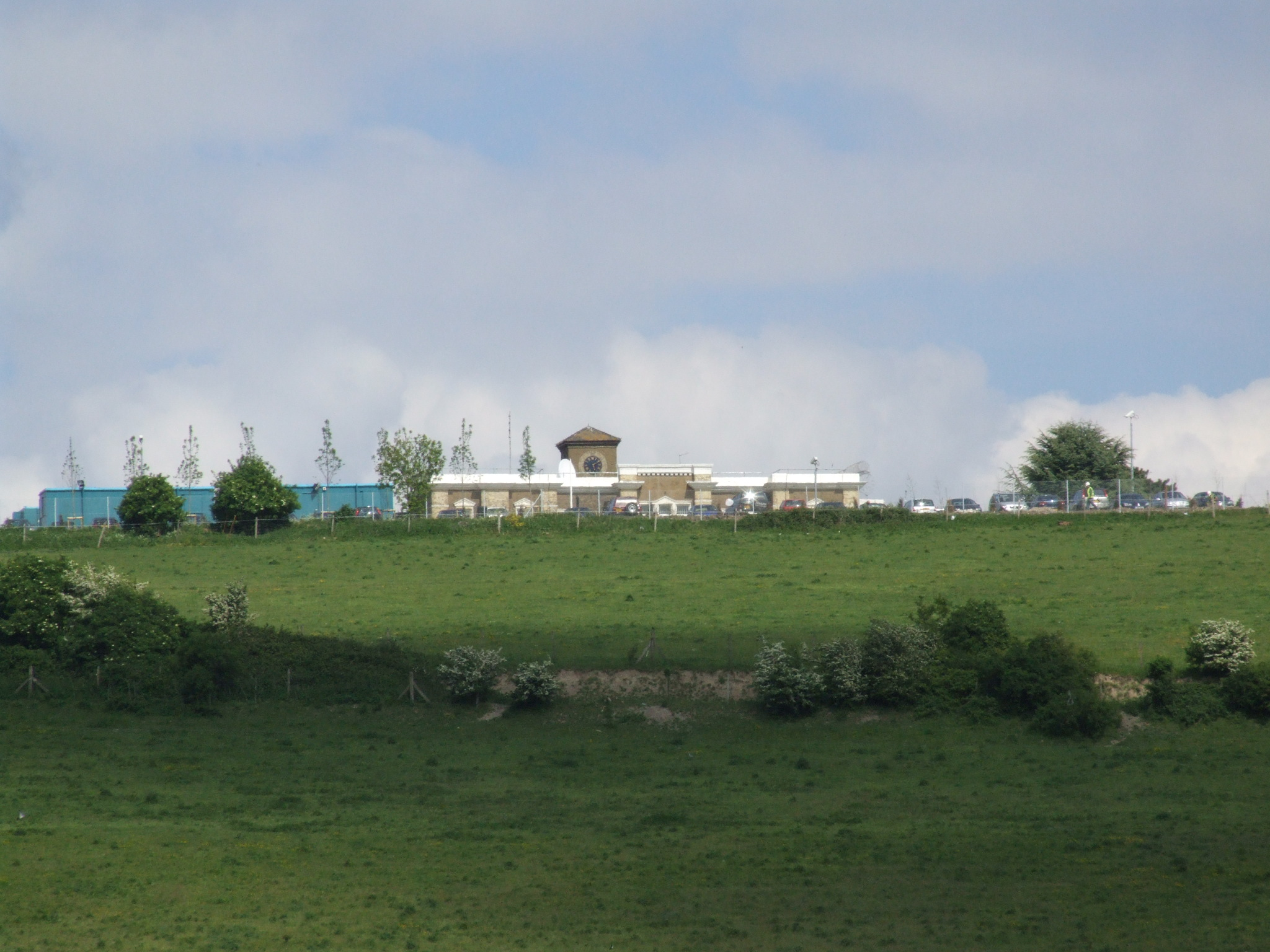
- HM Prison Rochester, former Borstal Prison
- Interactive map of HMP Rochester
- Location: Rochester, Kent
- Security class: C Cat Adult
- Population: 695 (February 2023)
- Opened: 3 August 1874
- Former name: Borstal Convict Prison
- Managed by: HM Prison Service
- Governor: Katie Jefferson
- Website: Rochester at justice.gov.uk

HM Prison Rochester (formerly known as Borstal Convict Prison and Borstal Institution) is a male Young Offenders Institution, founded in 1874, and located in the Borstal area of Rochester in Kent, England. The prison is operated by His Majesty's Prison Service, and is located next to HMP Cookham Wood.

== History ==
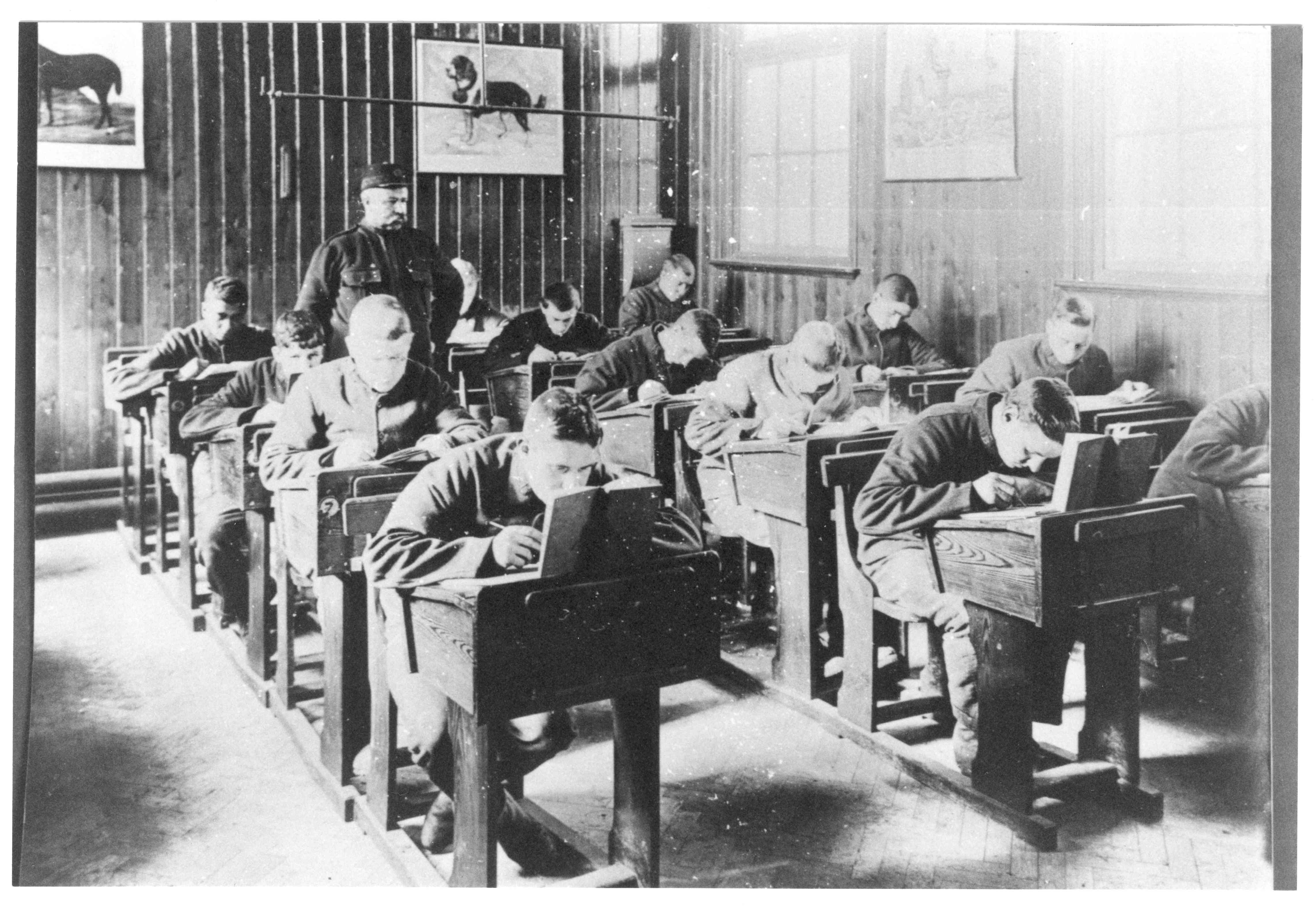
Rochester schoolroom and pupils, c. 1906

=== 19th Century ===
HMP Rochester opened on 3 August 1874 as Borstal Convict Prison, when a small working party of prisoners arrived from Chatham Convict Prison and stayed their first night.

=== 20th Century ===
In 1909, it officially became the Borstal Institution, an experimental juvenile reformatory prison, following work started by Sir Evelyn Ruggles-Brise in 1902. Because it was the first detention centre of its kind in the UK, the word "Borstal" became synonymous with other detention centres for youths across the country, and across the Empire.

The institution remained as a Borstal school until 1983, when it was converted into a Youth Custody Centre and renamed 'Rochester'. The prison later changed its role to operate as a remand centre for the Kent courts and sentenced category C and D adult males. Rochester then became a mixed site prison for immigration detainees and a resettlement unit for adult male prisoners. The prison also operated as a remand and allocation centre for males under the age of 21.

=== 21st Century ===
In January 2002, Rochester re-rolled to a prison solely for sentenced young men up to the age of 21.

In March 2003, Rochester Prison was criticised by its Board of Visitors who said there were few employment or educational opportunities to gain useful qualifications or work experience.

In August 2006, an inspection report from Her Majesty's Chief Inspector of Prisons declared that Rochester Prison was improving, but still had unresolved issues. Inspectors found that the prison was generally safe and had good staff-prisoner relations. However, it was called on to provide more work and combat bullying.

In March 2007, it was announced that the capacity was to be doubled to 700. This attracted strong opposition from locals. Construction briefly began in March 2007, but was on hold pending permission from Medway Council. This was granted, and in September 2008 a further four accommodation units were constructed.

== The prison today ==
Rochester is a Category C prison which holds convicted, sentenced adults and male young offenders aged 18 or over, in single or double cells, some of which have showers. As a resettlement prison, it offers a wide range of vocational training (including painting and decorating, carpentry, stonemasonry, construction, and catering), work opportunities, and offending behaviour programmes. Education opportunities include English and maths, IT, and distance learning.

An inspection by His Majesty's Chief Inspector of Prisons in August 2024 resulted in the first Urgent Notification being issued for a Category C prison. Inspectors found dilapidated accommodation, rising violence and self harm, and a lack of purposeful activity. Most noticeably, they found that "prisoners used cardboard and towels to fill gaps under doors to keep rats and mice from invading their cells, and the smell of rat urine in some areas was overpowering."

== Notable former inmates ==
- Michael Boateng, former professional footballer jailed for conspiracy to defraud as part of an investigation into match-fixing. Boateng has co-presented on a podcast called Banged Up talking about his time in Rochester.

== See also ==
- Chatham Convict Prison
