= HM Prison Cookham Wood =

Category C prison in Kent, England

Coordinates: 51.364031°N 0.494277°E

HMP Cookham Wood
- Interactive map of HMP Cookham Wood
- Location: Rochester, Kent, ME1 3LU
- Security class: Category C
- Population: 188 (December 2020)
- Opened: 1978; 48 years ago
- Former name: Borstal
- Managed by: HM Prison Services
- Governor: Paul Crossey
- Website: Cookham Wood at justice.gov.uk

HM Prison Cookham Wood is an adult Category C prison, using the premises of the original borstal or Young Offenders Institution in the village of Borstal (near Rochester, Kent) in England. The prison is operated by His Majesty's Prison and probation Service.

== History ==
The prison was built in 1978, next to HMP Rochester and was named Cookham Wood Young Offenders Institution. The new prison was originally for young men, but its use was changed to meet the growing need for secure female accommodation at the time.

In 1998 the prison started accepting female juvenile offenders (aged 12–14), and was refurbished for that purpose. The costs involved with the refurbishment and the new facilities provided at the prison led to the media branding Cookham Wood "Britain's most controversial jail".

In a 2003 report the Prison Reform Trust criticised Cookham Wood for being one of the most overcrowded women's prison in the UK. The report also highlighted serious drug misuse amongst inmates at the prison. However, a 2005 report by His Majesty's Chief Inspector of Prisons commended the prison for improving standards.

In 2007 the Prison Service announced that Cookham Wood would be converted to accept male young offenders. This was due to increased demand for places in men's prisons in the UK. Cookham Wood formally started taking male prisoners during 2008.

== The prison today ==
Cookham Wood is a Category C prison. Accommodation consists of single occupancy cells

All prisoners have access to showers, and 45 minutes outside in the open air every day. The prison operates a resettlement programme for people coming to the end of their sentences, and has links to community groups and employers.

In February 2014, the UK prison watchdog - the Independent Monitoring Boards - announced that they had serious concerns over the safety and decency for children at HMYoung Offenders Institution Cookham Wood. In 2024 it was repurposed as a Category C adult prison, initially to accommodate those jailed arising from the 2024 United Kingdom riots.

== Notable former inmates ==
- Myra Hindley
- Judy Carne
- Sandra Gregory
