= William Kitchiner =

English scientist and chef

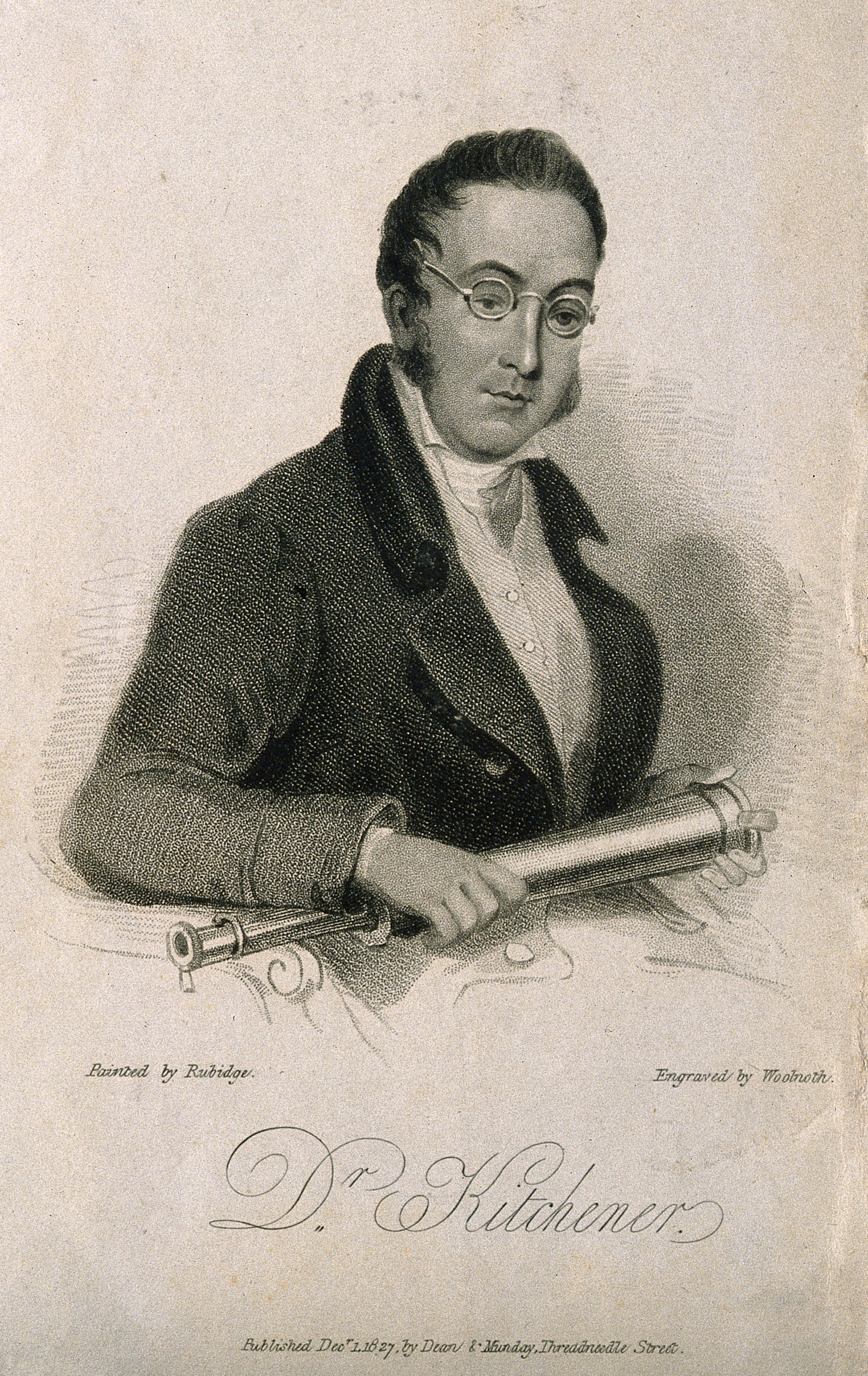
- Portrait of Kitchiner
- Born: 11 April 1778; England
- Died: 26 February 1827 (aged 48); London, England
- Resting place: St Clement Danes, City of Westminster, London
- Known for: Cook's Oracle, crisp, creator of Wow-Wow sauce
- Relatives: James Cecil, 6th Earl of Salisbury (grandfather)

William Kitchiner (11 April 1778 – 26 February 1827) was an English optician, amateur musician and cook. A celebrity chef, he was a household name during the 19th century, and his 1817 cookbook, The Cook's Oracle, was a bestseller in the United Kingdom and the United States. The origin of the crisp (also known as potato chip) is attributed to Kitchiner, with The Cook's Oracle including the earliest known recipe.

Unlike most food writers of the time he cooked the food himself, washed up afterwards, and performed all the household tasks he wrote about. He travelled around with his portable cabinet of taste, a folding cabinet containing his mustards and sauces. He was also the creator of Wow-Wow sauce.

== The Cook's Oracle ==
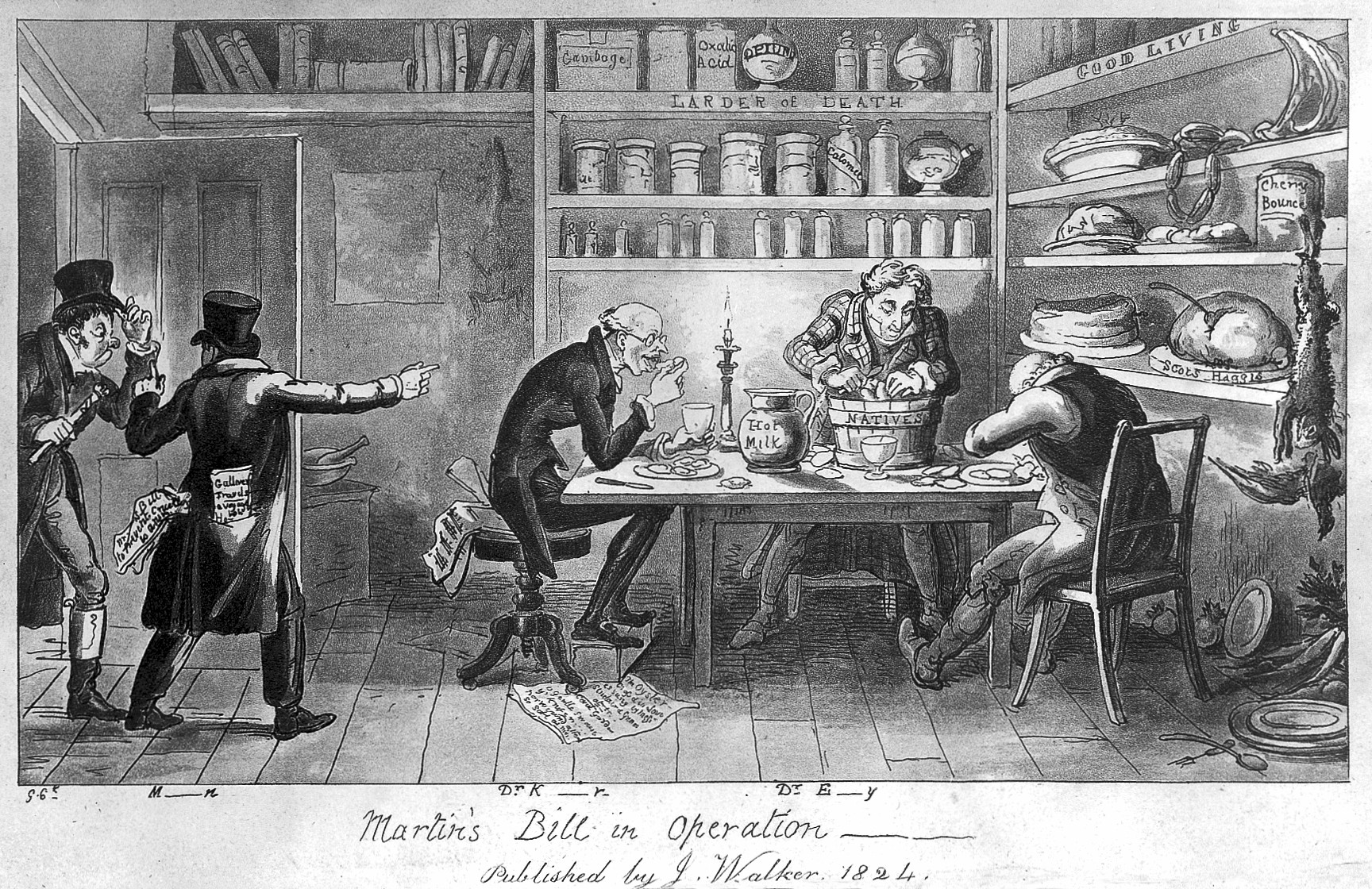
Caricature of Richard Martin, William Kitchiner, Samuel Phillips Eady: Martin's Bill in Operation (published 1824).

Kitchiner's most well-known book The Cook's Oracle, full title Apicius Redivivus, or the Cook's Oracle, was first published in 1817. It is also known as The Cook's Oracle: Containing receipts for plain cookery on the most economical plan for private families, etc.

The Cook's Oracle includes eleven ketchup recipes, including two each for mushroom, walnut and tomato ketchups, one each for cucumber, oyster, cockle and mussel ketchups, and also a recipe for Wow-Wow sauce.

The book contains what may be one of the earliest references to crisps, in a recipe for "Potatoes fried in Slices or Shavings", which instructs the reader to "peel large potatoes, slice them about a quarter of an inch thick, or cut them in shavings round and round, as you would peel a lemon; dry them well in a clean cloth, and fry them in lard or dripping".

== Optics ==
Kitchiner maintained a collection of over 51 telescopes and published extensively on optical science. His largest contribution was that of the invention of the pancratic eyetube, a magnification device for both celestial and terrestrial observations. He gifted the patent to the Dollond family for manufacturing and detailed the invention in ''The economy of Eyes" (1824).

== Life ==
Kitchiner was born in 1778, the son of a prosperous merchant. His father's legacy meant he did not have to work, but instead was able to live on his own means. Although claiming to have been educated at Eton and Glasgow, he attended neither institution, but the link to Glasgow enabled him to claim to be a medical doctor (M.D.), a claim no-one checked.

He was the grandson of James Cecil, 6th Earl of Salisbury. His mother, Mary Cecil-Grave, was the illegitimate daughter of Cecil and Cecil’s mistress, Mary Grave.

His love life was chequered: he married, separated, and had an illegitimate son, William Brown Kitchiner (1804–1861) whom he acknowledged and funded and through whom he is the great-grandfather of Essex Reade (1855–1908). He surrounded himself with like-minded individuals, setting up a "committee of taste" which revolved around dinners attended by Charles Kemble, Samuel Rogers, Theodore Hook and John Soane among others hosted by himself or held elsewhere. The Prince of Wales later, George IV was also a repeat guest, earning Kitchiner the informal nickname. "Royal Cook"

His dinners were renowned and made him something of a celebrity within a certain circle. He was very important for that reason. Unlike most food writers of the time he cooked the food himself (though not alone), washed up afterward, and performed all the household tasks he wrote about. In his writings he extolled the virtues of a ''magazine of taste'', a "pyramidical epergne" which could also be made into a portable traveling case, and which contained 28 different ingredients including liqueurs, spice blends, and proprietary sauces.

He died in 1827 of an apparent heart attack, the day before he was due to change his will to remove his son, whom he had decided no longer merited the legacy.

== Books ==
- The Invalid’s Oracle
- The Housekeeper's Ledger
- The Traveller's Oracle
- The Art of Invigorating and Prolonging Life
- Horse and Carriage Keeper's Guide
- The Pleasures of Making a Will
- The Economy of The Eyes: For the improvement of the sight (also covers Opera Glasses, Pancratic Magnifier for double stars and day telescopes)
- The Economy of The Eyes Part 2: Telescopes
- The Sea Songs of Charles Dibdin, ed.
