= Borstal Boy (disambiguation) =

Borstal Boy may refer to:

- Borstal Boy, an autobiographical novel published in 1958 by Brendan Behan
- Borstal Boy (play), the 1967 play adaptation by playwright Frank McMahon
- Borstal Boy (film), the 2000 film adaptation by screenwriters Nye Heron and Peter Sheridan
