= HM Prison Hindley =

Prison in Greater Manchester, England

Coordinates: 53.517802°N 2.576937°W

HMP Hindley
- Interactive map of HMP Hindley
- Location: Bickershaw, Greater Manchester
- Capacity: 600
- Population: ~570 (19 May 2020)
- Opened: 1961
- Managed by: HM Prison Services
- Governor: Fiona Merrifield
- Website: Hindley at justice.gov.uk

HM Prison Hindley is an adult male prison located in the village of Bickershaw (near Wigan) in Greater Manchester, England and operated by His Majesty's Prison Service.

== History ==
In 1961, Hindley Prison opened as a Borstal. In 1983 it was re-classified as a Youth Custody Centre. Hindley was then re-classified as an adult prison. In 1997 it became a joint prison and Young Offenders Institution.

In 2002, His Majesty's Chief Inspector of Prisons recorded many good initiatives taking place at Hindley, particularly in suicide prevention, drugs strategy, sentence planning and joint work with the police service to monitor and act on racial incidents. However the Inspector criticised inadequate reception procedures, insufficient purposeful activity and patchy help with resettlement at the prison.

In December 2004 a security alert was sparked when two inmates staged a rooftop protest at Hindley Prison. On 5 October 2005, over 100 extra staff were drafted in to deal with a riot at the prison. The riot caused more than £145,000 damage and it took more than seven weeks to fully restore the wing.

== Adult prison ==
The Youth Justice Board announced on 23 October 2014 that it was withdrawing completely from Hindley which became a Category C prison for male prisoners from the age of 21 upwards.

Accommodation at the prison is made up of seven secure units, consisting of single and double cells. Hindley is a combined establishment with a regime that offers opportunities for inmates to gain qualifications, address offending behaviour, and reintegrate into society on their release. Regime provision includes learning and skills, as well as workshop places (which include construction skills) and physical education. Hindley also operates a listener and peer support scheme for those who may be at risk of suicide or self-harm. The prison's medical provision includes an in-patient healthcare facility and a mental health day care centre.

== Notable inmates ==
- Elliot Castro, fraudster
- Will Cornick, jailed in 2014 for a minimum of 20 years for murdering his schoolteacher
- Sean Mercer, shot dead 11-year-old boy in Liverpool in August 2007.
