= National Association of Remand Homes Superintendents and Matrons =

The National Association of Remand Homes Superintendents and Matrons was a professional organisation for the staff of children's remand homes in the United Kingdom.

John Tonks, from Manchester was president in 1951.

It held its annual conference in Brighton in October 1953.

It presented evidence to the Underwood Committee on Maladjusted Children.
