= Julian Reade =

British Assyriologist (born 1938)

Julian Reade FSA
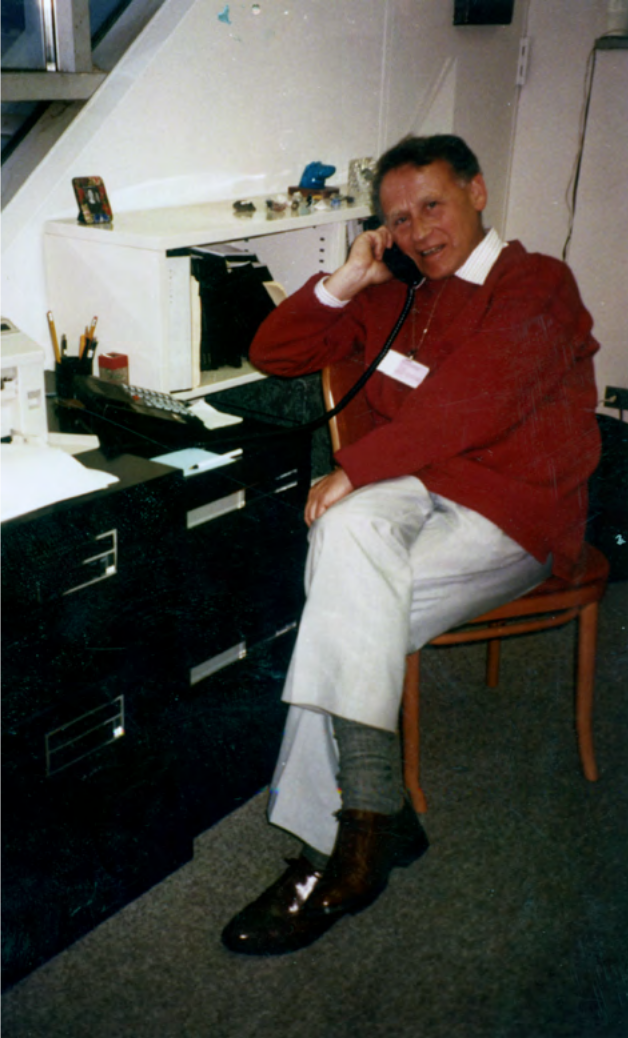
- Born: 21 July 1938 (age 88); Leamington Spa, Warwickshire, England
- Parent: Arthur Reade
- Relatives: Patrick Reade

Academic background
- Education: King's college, Cambridge: BA, MA, PhD.

Academic work
- Discipline: Archaeology; Assyriology
- Institutions: British Museum
- Main interests: Mesopotamian archaeology; Assyrian art

Julian Edgeworth Reade (born 21 July 1938) is a British Middle Eastern archaeologist and Assyriologist who specializes in the archaeology and art of ancient Mesopotamia, particularly the Neo-Assyrian Empire. He was employed by the British Museum in London for most of his career, where he was responsible for the Middle Eastern collections as a curator. He retired from the British Museum in 2000 after 25 years of service.

== Academic career ==
Julian Reade received his early education between 1943 and 1952 at a series of preparatory schools in England, including Thornbury Preparatory, Francis Holland, Eaton House, Hordle House, and finally Summerfields in Oxford. He continued his education from 1952 to 1957 as a King's Scholar at Eton College in Windsor. He was subsequently admitted in 1957 as a Foundation Scholar to King's College, University of Cambridge, where he read Classics and Oriental Languages, specialising in Arabic and Persian. Following his Master's degree in 1964, he became a research student in Oriental Studies at Cambridge, specialising in Assyriology and Near Eastern Archaeology. This period was characterized by scholarships, fieldwork in Iraq, and work on his doctoral dissertation, which he defended in 1970, with a PhD on "The Design and Decoration of Neo-Assyrian Public Buildings".

Following his doctorate, Julian Reade continued his academic career from 1971 to 1974 at the Department of Near Eastern Archaeology at the University of Oxford. He was admitted to the Society of Antiquaries of London in 1973, of which he remains a fellow. The most significant stage of his career began in 1975, when he became Keeper of Western Asiatic Antiquities at the British Museum in London, the title the department held at that time, before its subsequent renaming. He held this position for 25 years until his retirement in 2000. Reade wrote a number of papers and article on the history of the museum's Near Eastern collection, and the circumstances of its formation, particularly through the excavations of Austen Henry Layard In July 1991 Reade accompanied Princess Margaret to the official opening of the Early Mesopotamia Gallery.

Along with his museum work, Julian Reade was engaged in teaching, including in 1981 as a visiting professor at the University of Copenhagen, and in 1982/83 as a visiting lecturer at the Institute of Archaeology in London. He also took on some voluntary roles in learned societies, serving as treasurer of the Society of Arabian Studies from 1985 to 1990, and as honorary librarian of the Royal Asiatic Society from 1994 to 1996. In 2003 he returned to Copenhagen as a visiting professor, and since 2004 has held a continuing appointment as a adjunct and affiliated professor in Near Eastern Studies, at the Institute for Cross-Cultural and Regional Studies.

In addition to his museum and academic work. Reade undertook archaeological fieldwork. His first project took him in 1961 to Corbridge and Cheddar in England. This was followed by several excavations across the Near East: 1962-63 at Nimrud (Ancient Kalhu, Iraq), 1963-64 at Can Hasan (Turkey), 1964-71 at Tell al-rimah (Iraq), 1967-73 at Tell Taya (Iraq), 1987-92 at Ras al-Hadd (Oman), and from 2008 at Dangeil (Sudan).

== Assessment of scholarship ==
Julian Reade's work has focused on the analysis of archaeological finds within the context of Assyrian history, art and ideology. His most significant scholarly contributions relate to the sculptures and palace reliefs of Nimrud and their depiction of royal power and religious symbolism. His research includes the archaeology of the Arabian Gulf, including questions of the cultural relationships between Mesopotamia and the regions of Dilmun, Magan and Meluhha.

Irving Finkel and St John Simpson, editors of Reade's Festschrift, described him as an exceptional scholar and curator, whose intellectual skills have brought convincing clarity to his research. At the British Museum he brought organisation to his department, including object registration, the openings of the Early and Late Mesopotamian Galleries, and he supervised the travelling exhibition series Art and Empire: Treasures from Assyria in the British Museum. Reade had the ability to recognise the potential of new fields of research, such as the Akkadian period in northern Iraq, and coastal Oman in antiquity: "His publications are not only extensive and broad-based, but often embody different disciplines."

Simo Parpola described him as one of the scholars who revolutionised the study of the Neo-Assyrian Emprire, citing his "unparalleled knowledge of the archaeology, material culture, visual art, architecture, history, chronology and geography of the period.". Paul Collins, of the Ashmolean Museum said of him: "There are few scholars who can match the contribution made by Julian Reade to our understanding of the recovery, reception and reconstruction of ancient Assyria". Stefania Ermidoro of Newcastle University described Reade as a pioneer in combining archival, philological and archaeological evidence to explore ancient Assyria and its modern rediscovery. Mogens Trolle Larsen of the University of Copenhagen noted that Reade contributed a series of articles in the German academic journal Baghdader Mitteilungen (1979–1980) on Assyrian architectural decoration, partly based on his PhD thesis, and this was the basis for further research on Assyrian art.

== Publications ==
Reade is the author of a number of scholarly articles, essays and books. These include articles on the conquests of the Assyrian queen Semiramis, the location of the garden complex at Nineveh (often associated with the Hanging Gardens of Babylon), and the interpretation of individual relief scenes. Among his most significant works are:

- Assyrian Sculpture (British Museum Press, 1983; 2nd edition 1998). In a review for the Ancient Society journal of Australia, J.D. Hall described the book as having particular value to students due to the quality of the illustrations, descriptive captions and accompanying text.
- Mesopotamia (British Museum Press, 1991; 2nd edition 2000). Part of the British Museum Introductory Guides series, offering a short introduction to the history and archaeology of Mesopotamia.
- (Ed.) The Indian Ocean in Antiquity (Kegan Paul International in association with the British Museum, 1996). A collection of essays on ancient trade and cultural exchange across the Indian Ocean.
- (Ed.) The Charles Collection of Cypriote Antiquities (1986).
- Art of the First Cities: The Third Millennium B.C. from the Mediterranean to the Indus. New York: Metropolitan Museum of Art. 2003. pp. 93–107, 120–132, 496. ISBN 978-1-58839-043-1. OCLC 51752677. OL 3683993M. Reade wrote two chapters and the chronology for this catalogue of the Metropolitan Museum of Art exhibition of the same name, held between May and August 2003. One chapter, The Royal Tombs of Ur, received attention due to his analysis of tomb PG 755, discovered in Ur by Sir Leonard Woolley in 1924. The tomb was relatively modest, but the treasures placed around it have been described as dazzling, including a golden helmet that was under Reade's stewardship in the British Museum. There was some evidence suggesting that this was the tomb of king Meskalamdug. Reade suggested that it was more likely to be a prince, the son of the king, since there was another, more lavish tomb, PG 789, nearby, more suited for the monarch. Other researchers have reach different conclusions about this mystery.
- Design and destruction: the palace of Ashurbanipal at Nineveh. Vienna: Selbstverlag des Instituts für Orientalistik der Universität Wien. 2022. ISBN 978-3-900345-14-3. OCLC 1336480821. The book covers the North Palace of Ashurbanipal at Nineveh, discovered at the end of 1853 by Hormuzd Rassam. In her review of this book, Pauline Albenda described it as "a major work that increases previously available knowledge ... The importance of this book is assured."

He wrote the Oxford Dictionary of National Biography entry for his colleague David Oates, who he first met at Nimrud, and who encouraged Reade to study for a PhD.

== Festschrift ==
- Finkel, Irving L.; Simpson, St John, eds. (2020). In context: the Reade Festschrift. Oxford: Archaeopress Archaeology. doi:10.2307/j.ctv1ddckv5. ISBN 978-1-78969-607-3. JSTOR j.ctv1ddckv5. OCLC 1229973217.
