= Essex Reade =

Merchant banker

Essex Edgeworth William Douglas Reade (died 1908) was a British banker who served as the Buenos Aires agent of Baring Brothers from 1891 to 1905, playing a central role in the debt restructuring negotiations that followed the Baring crisis of 1890. He is the great-grandson of chef William Kitchiner.

== Career ==
Prior to serving as an agent for Baring, Reade was director of the El Salvador Railway Construction Co Ltd, London, from 1886 to 1889 establishing him within the Argentine railway investment network before taking up the agency.

In July 1891, Essex arrived in Buenos Aires and superseded Arthur Bowden Smith as Baring's agent, a position he held for fourteen years until he was replaced by Windham Baring in 1905. His correspondence with Baring consists of 939 letters and 595 telegrams that are held in the Baring Archive, London (collection HC4.1.124), and form part of a group of 2,406 other pieces of correspondence used by researches to study the history of British investment in Argentina.

During his tenure, Reade reporting to Baring on the Buenos Aires Drainage and Waterworks, the Curamalan Estate, the Western Railway of Santa Fe, the Western Railway of Uruguay, The Anglo Argentine Tramways and the Argentine 4% Railway Guaranteee bonds. Tehreem Husain describes Reade in a 2024 peer-reviewed study published in Business History as "a trustworthy, astute and experienced agent" whose primary role during 1891-1895 was securing the best debt settlement scheme in the aftermath of the Baring crisis.

== Family ==
Reade is the great-grandson of William Kitchiner MD (1778–1827), the cookery writer and inventor of Potato chips, through his mother Julia Macdonnell Kitchiner, daughter of William Brown Kitchiner, who is the elder Kitchiner's son.

Reade married Sheelah Maud Emily Chichester on 11 April 1901. She was the daughter of Hon. Francis Algernon James Chichester son of Arthur Chichester, 1st Baron Templemore and of Lady Emily Octavia Stewart, daughter of Randolph Stewart, 9th Earl of Galloway. . They had one son, Arthur Reade (1902–1971), who served in World War II as part of the Special Operations Executive. Reade died on 11 October 1908.
