= NJ-STEP =

New Jersey prison education program

- Formation: 2012
- Founder: Todd Clear
- Executive Director: Christopher J. Agans
- Director of Transitions: Regina Diamond Rodriguez
- Website: njstep.newark.rutgers.edu

NJ-STEP (New Jersey Scholarship and Transformative Education in Prison Consortium) is a prison education initiative in New Jersey which seeks to provide education and rehabilitation to incarcerated people. It was established in 2012. Todd Clear, provost of Rutgers University-Newark and former dean of the Rutgers School of Criminal Justice, is the founder of the NJ-STEP program. The organization began receiving funding in 2013. The NJ-STEP program was created to provide qualifying incarcerated individuals with classes to receive their college degrees. NJ-STEP partners with colleges Princeton University, Rutgers University-Newark, Drew University, the College of New Jersey, Mercer University, Raritan Valley, Essex County College, Salem College, and Rutgers University-Camden.

== Mountain View Program ==
The "Mountain View program" is used to recruit incarcerated individuals to take courses from Rutgers University. The Mountain View program was created by Donald Rogen, in 2005. It started as a beta program then grew into a collaborative program with the start of NJ-STEP. NJ-STEP was the model come to life by partnering colleges which Mountain View was able build off of. Rutgers University Newark and Camden has partnered with the Mountain View program. The program was created to help enroll previously incarcerated individuals into college upon release. The process of the Mountain View program calls for the individual to go through a screening process. This process includes checking the severity of the applicants' felonies and how applicants having been doing in regard to attending classes and having good behavior. Also, a requirement of 15-20 college credits and having a GED/College Diploma is a requirement to be considered. After this process Mountain View assist the eligible applicants in becoming college graduates from Rutgers University.

=== The Sunshine Lady Foundation ===
One of the first funders of the NJ-STEP program is The Sunshine Lady Foundation. The Sunshine Lady Foundation was founded and funded by Doris Buffett in 1996. Doris Buffets wealth funds the program and still does today with the assistance of her brother Warren Buffett's investments in the program. Diane Grimsley is the President of The Sunshine Lady Foundation and has been since 1996. The purpose that the foundation serves is to fund programs and promote education for those who are less fortunate and looking to begin a new life with purpose. The foundation funds NJ-STEP to align with their mission and have funded the NJ-STEP program since 2013.
