= Borstal, Rochester =

Area of Rochester, Kent, England

Coordinates: 51.374098°N 0.486304°E

Borstal
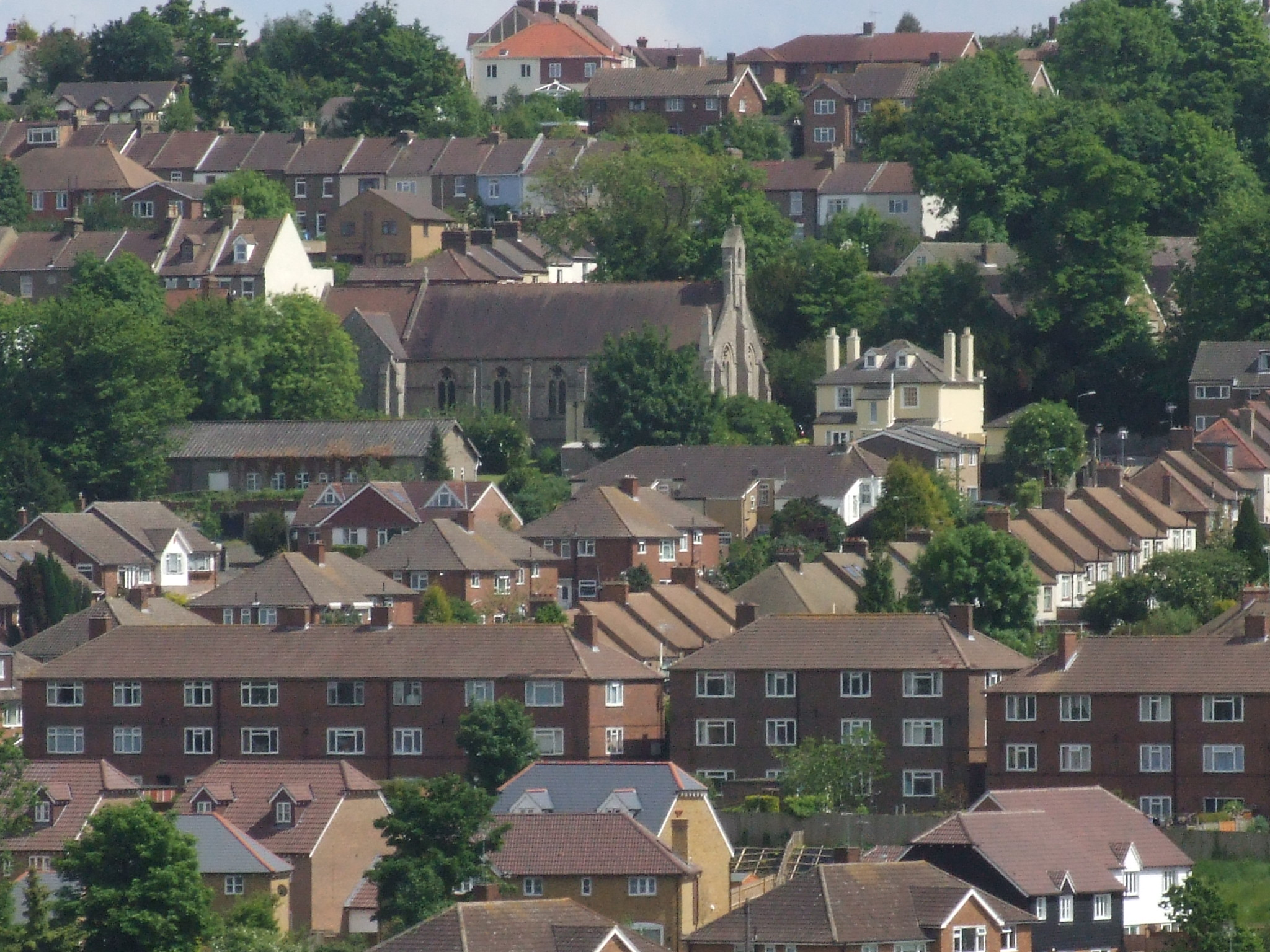
- Borstal from the M2 bridge in mid-May 2008

- Location within Kent
- OS grid reference: TQ731668
- Unitary authority: Medway
- Ceremonial county: Kent
- Region: South East
- Country: England
- Sovereign state: United Kingdom
- Post town: Rochester
- Postcode district: ME1
- Dialling code: 01634
- Police: Kent
- Fire: Kent
- Ambulance: South East Coast
- UK Parliament: Rochester and Strood

Borstal is a location in the Medway unitary authority of Kent in South East England. Originally a village near Rochester, it has become absorbed by the expansion of that town. The youth prison at Borstal gave its name to the Borstal reform school system.

== History ==
Its name came from Anglo-Saxon burg-steall "fort site" or "place of refuge", likely referring to the hill there. The hill is now home to Fort Borstal. However, artist Donald Maxwell, a local resident, argued that a 'borstal' was "a track up a chalk hill", saying he had heard local farmers use the term in that way. (Maxwell lived at No. 3 Borstal Villas from 1908 to 1930.)

The village is mentioned in the Domesday Book of 1086 as Borchetelle, and then consisted of a 50-acre meadow, six households and two watermills. By 1769 this riverside farm was called Bostle, and probably had been joined by a wayside inn called the White Horse on the valley road above. In about 1830 Borstal House was built near the farm, and at the time of the 1840s Tithe Map the settlement was just a hamlet of a few cottages, mostly owned by local woman Mary Tuff. She sold her nearby lime-works in 1853, which was developed into a cement factory owned from 1864 by London solicitor Samuel Barker Booth. Its success led to the hamlet's growth into a village of terraced houses with two new pubs, shops and a workmen's institute. A second cement factory, called Borstal Manor, opened in 1898 near the original Domesday settlement. Both works closed in 1900, but continued to produce cement intermittently until about 1920. The village went into a decline when its factories closed, but underwent a resurgence of new house-building in the 1930s, when it became a suburb of Rochester. Borstal House, by then renamed Borstal Manor, was demolished in about 1960. The western end of the meadow mentioned in Domesday Book is now crossed by the M2 motorway and the Channel Tunnel Rail Link. The rest of it has been built on.

The parish church, built in 1879, is dedicated to St Matthew. It was built on land donated by Mary Tuff's son Thomas, who also dedicated a window in the church to Saints Matthew and Margaret. Another window is dedicated to Marian Tuff, the wife of Rochester MP Charles Tuff Jr. (the grandson of Mary), and her sister Martha Emily Browne.

== Fort Borstal ==
Fort Borstal was built as an afterthought from the 1859 Royal Commission on the Defence of the United Kingdom, by convict labour between 1875 and 1885. A narrow gauge railway called the Eastern Defences Railway was built from a pier on the River Medway at Borstal, up the hillside to the fort, and on to Forts Bridgewood, Horsted and Luton to transfer materials and convict labourers to the building sites. Fort Borstal is of polygonal design and was never originally armed. An anti-aircraft battery was based there in the Second World War. It is now in private ownership.

== Prisons ==
On the edge of Borstal are HM Prison Rochester and HM Prison Cookham Wood. HM Prison Rochester was originally known as Borstal Prison and was founded in 1870; it became for many years an experimental juvenile prison of the reformatory type set up in 1902. Because it was the first detention centre of its kind in the United Kingdom, the word "Borstal" became synonymous with other detention centres for youths across the country, and elsewhere. In view of that connotation, the prison was renamed 'Rochester Young Offenders Institution'. HM Prison Cookham Wood was added to the site later, in 1978.

== Bibliography ==
- Austin, John K. The Medway Shore as It Was: Burham to Borstal, Rainmore Books (2007). ISBN 0-9553903-2-X
- Bergess, Winifred F., and Sage, Stephen. Five Medway Villages: Pictorial History of Aylesford, Burham, Wouldham, Eccles and Borstal, Meresborough Books (1983). ISBN 0-905270-64-9
- Hannington, Stephen. Out of the Shadows, A History of Borstal Village 1840–1914, Birch Leaf Books (2015). ISBN 978-0-9564677-7-5
