= Borstal =

Type of youth detention centre

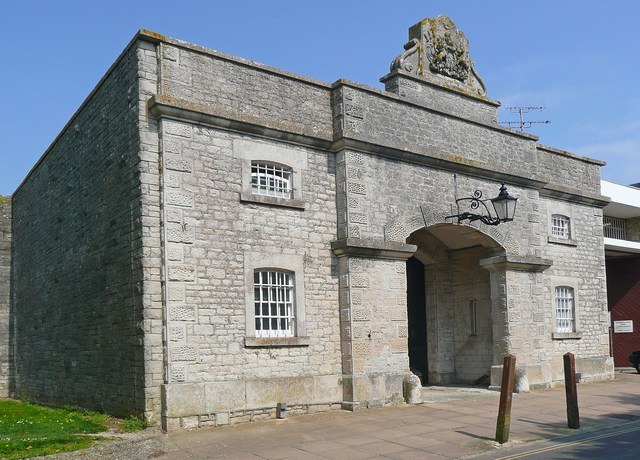
Entrance to The Grove Prison. Built in 1848, it operated as an adult prison from 1848, a borstal from 1921, and a young offenders institution from 1988.

A borstal is a type of youth detention centre, commonly known as a borstal school in India, where they remain in use. Until the late 20th century, borstals existed in the United Kingdom, several member states of the Commonwealth and the Republic of Ireland.

Borstals were run by HM Prison Service and were intended to reform young offenders. The word derived from the first such institution established in 1902 near the English village of Borstal in Kent, and is sometimes used loosely to apply to other kinds of youth institutions and reformatories, such as approved schools and youth detention centres. The court sentence was officially called "borstal training". Borstals were originally for offenders under 21, but in the 1930s the maximum age was increased to 23. The Criminal Justice Act 1982 abolished the borstal system in the UK, replacing borstals with youth custody centres.

In India, borstal schools are used for the imprisonment of minors. As of 31 December 2014, there were 20 functioning borstal schools in India, with a combined total capacity of 2,108 inmates.

== History ==
=== United Kingdom ===
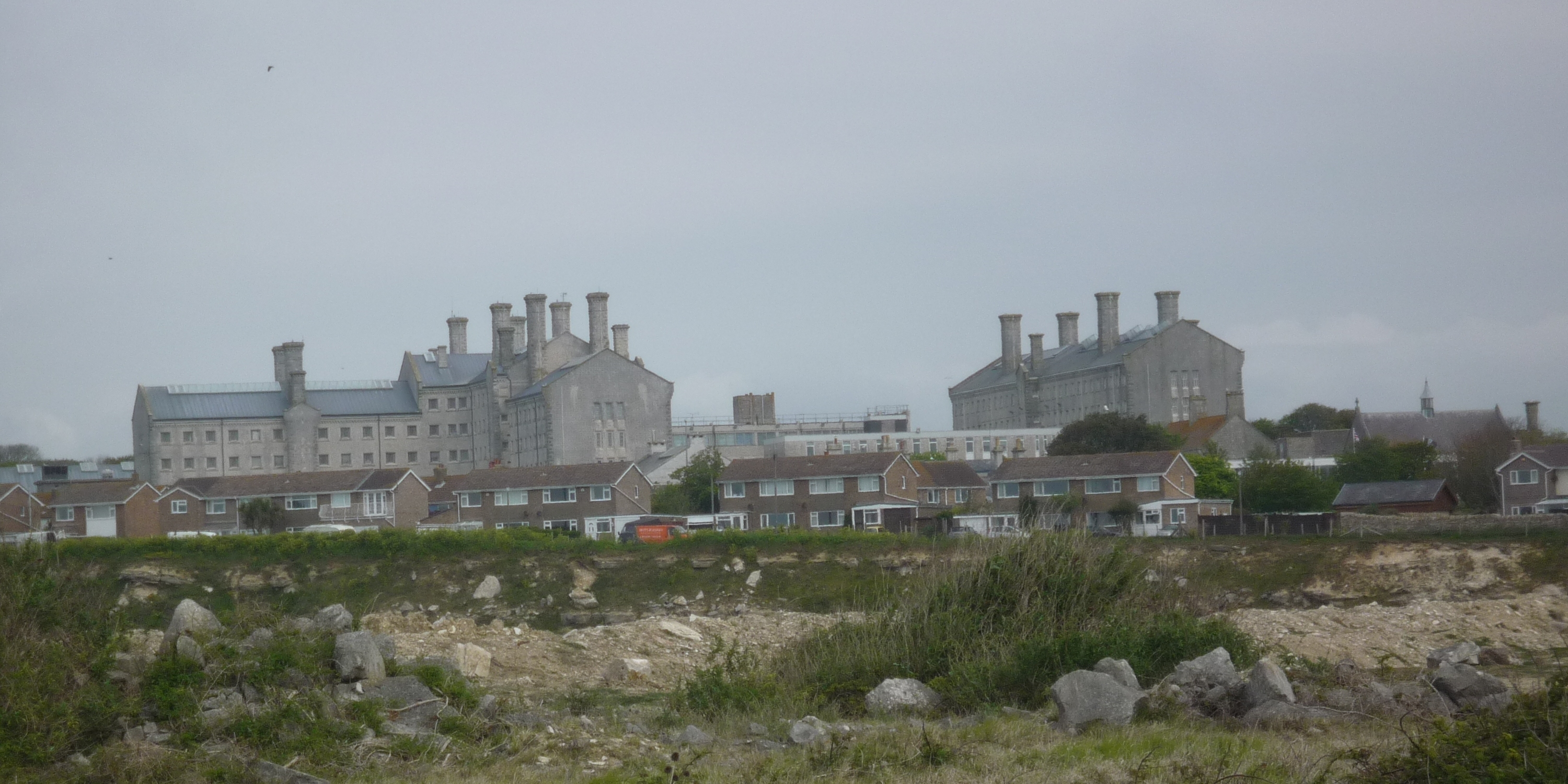
HMP Portland, Dorset, former Borstal

The Gladstone Committee (1895) first proposed the concept of the borstal, wishing to separate youths from older convicts in adult prisons. It was the task of Sir Evelyn Ruggles-Brise (1857–1935), a prison commissioner, to introduce the system, and the first such institution was established at Borstal Prison in a village called Borstal, near Rochester, Kent, England, in 1902. Although originally created to be a typical prison, Borstal evolved into something new, with the name still recognised today. The redesigned prison regime focused on education rather than punishment, aiming to avoid inmates reoffending.

The system was developed on a national basis and formalised in the Prevention of Crime Act 1908. The regimen in these institutions was designed to be "educational rather than punitive", but it was highly regulated, with a focus on routine, discipline and authority during the early years. Borstal institutions were originally designed to offer education, regular work and discipline, though one commentator has claimed that "more often than not they were breeding grounds for bullies and psychopaths."

The Criminal Justice Act 1982 officially abolished the borstal system in the UK, introducing youth custody centres instead. By the late 1960s and early 1970s, many borstals were being closed and replaced with institutions called Detention Centres and, from 1972, also with Community Service Order sentences.

==== Corporal punishment ====
Except in Northern Ireland, the only corporal punishment officially available in borstals was the birch for mutiny or assaulting an officer, and this could be imposed only by the visiting magistrates, subject in each case to the personal approval of the Home Secretary, just as in adult prisons. Only male inmates over 18 might be so punished. This power was very rarely used – there were only seven birching cases in borstals in the 10 years to 1936. This birching power was available only in England and Wales (not in Scottish borstals). Caning as a more day-to-day punishment was used in the single borstal in Northern Ireland but was not authorised in Scotland or England and Wales. Confusion on this matter arises perhaps because in approved schools, a quite different kind of youth institution based more on the open "boarding school" model, caning was an official punishment for young people (maximum age 19).

=== Commonwealth ===
A similar system under the name "borstal" or "borstal school" has also been introduced in several other Commonwealth countries.

==== Canada ====
The New Haven Borstal School was opened in Burnaby, British Columbia in 1939 and closed in 2001.

==== India ====
In India, nine states, namely Himachal Pradesh, Jharkhand, Karnataka, Kerala, Maharashtra, Punjab, Rajasthan, Tamil Nadu, and Telangana, have borstal schools in their respective jurisdictions. Tamil Nadu had the highest capacity, at 678 inmates (as of 2014). Himachal Pradesh and Kerala are the only states that have the capacity to lodge female inmates in two of their borstal schools. There are no borstal schools in any of the union territories.

=== Ireland ===
In Ireland the Criminal Justice Act, 1960 (Section 12) removed the term "borstal" from official use. This was part of a policy to broaden the system from reform and training institutions to a place of detention for youths between 17 and 21 for any sentence which carried a prison term. The only borstal was Clonmel Borstal, in County Tipperary. Founded in 1906, it finally closed in 1956, when the remaining detainees were transferred to the newly established St. Patrick's Institution in Dublin. Industrial schools performed a similar function to borstals.

== See also ==
- Young Offender Institution
- Young offender
- Youth detention center
- Clonmel Borstal
