= Military Intelligence (disambiguation) =

Military intelligence is a military discipline that uses information collection and analysis approaches to provide guidance and direction to commanders in support of their decisions.

Military Intelligence may also refer to:

- Military Intelligence (Czech Republic), military intelligence service of the Czech Republic
- Military Intelligence (Pakistan), intelligence arm of the Pakistan Army
- Military Intelligence (Palestine)
- Military Intelligence Directorate (Israel)
- Military Intelligence Directorate (Syria)
- Military Intelligence Service (United States)
- Directorate of Military Intelligence (disambiguation)
- Military Intelligence and Security Service (disambiguation)
- Military Intelligence Service (disambiguation)

== See also ==
- Defense intelligence (disambiguation)
- National Intelligence Service (disambiguation)
- Federal Intelligence Service (disambiguation)
- Foreign Intelligence service (disambiguation)
- State Intelligence Service (disambiguation)
- General Intelligence Directorate (disambiguation)
- Directorate of Military Intelligence (disambiguation)
- Intelligence Bureau (disambiguation)
