= Ministry of Security =

Ministry of Security may refer to:

== As a short name ==
- Ministry of Internal Security (disambiguation)
- Ministry of National Security (disambiguation)
- Ministry of Public Security (disambiguation)
- Ministry for State Security (disambiguation)
- Ministry of Social Security (disambiguation)

== By country ==
- Ministry of Security (Argentina)
- Ministry of Security (Bosnia and Herzegovina)
- Ministry of Security (Laos)
- Ministry of Security (Puntland)
- Ministry of Security of the Russian Federation
