= City guard =

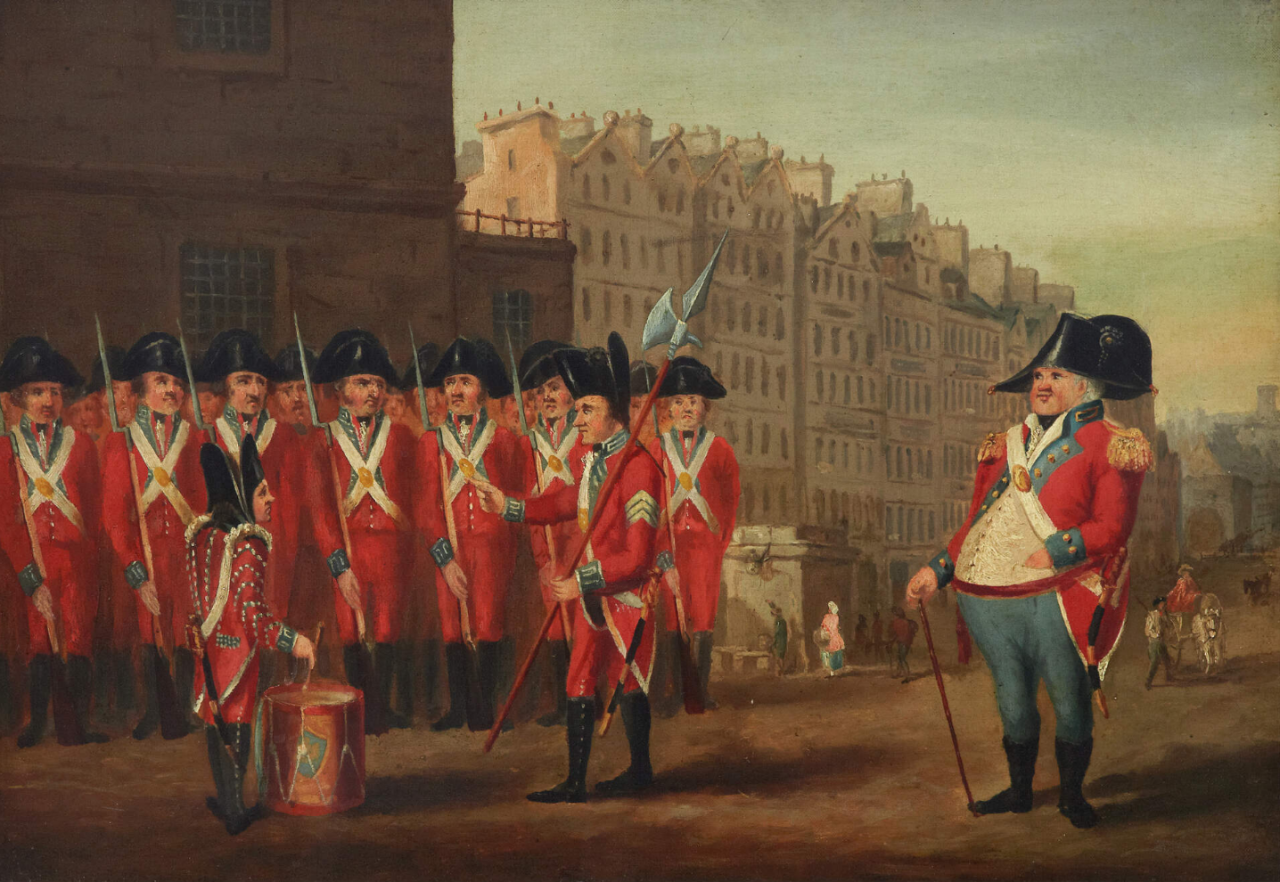
c. 1800 painting of the Edinburgh town guard

A city guard, city watch, town guard, or town watch were local militia companies formed to enforce municipal laws. Usually subordinate to the local municipal government, many cities had their own guard formations which doubled as police and military forces in times of need.

== Algeria ==
The Garde Communale was a paramilitary security force that existed during the Algerian Civil War.

== Brazil ==
Municipal Guards are the municipal police of Brazil

== Poland ==
City Guards are the municipal police of Poland.

== Spain ==
The Guàrdia Urbana is the municipal police of Barcelona.

== Ukraine ==
Many Ukrainian cities such as Odesa have their own municipal guards.

== United States ==
After 1830, with the Indian removal policy of the federal government giving white settlers a monopoly over the land east of the Mississippi, many states disbanded their unorganized militias in favor of volunteer militia units that frequently called themselves city or national guards. These companies performed functions such as assisting local law enforcement, providing troops for ceremonies and parades or acting as a benevolent social club. The groups of company size were usually uniformed and armed themselves as well as erecting armories through their own contributions. Volunteer units of sufficient size could elect their own officers and apply for a state charter under names that they themselves chose.

=== Companies ===
- Boston City Guard
- Cambridge City Guard
- Chicago Light Guard
- Detroit Light Guard
- Hannibal Guards
- Montgomery Guards
- Richardson Light Guard
- Salem Light Guard
- Swatara Guards
- Wallace Guards
- Wamesit Guard
- Worcester City Guard

With the unification of laws and centralization of state power (such as the Municipal Police Act of 1844 in New York City), such formations became increasingly incorporated into state-run police forces.

The Militia Act of 1903 remade city guard forces by stipulating all organized militia companies were to be incorporated into the Army National Guard or Naval Militias.

== See also ==
- Belgian Civic Guard
- Cohortes urbanae
- Guardia Urbana
- Schutterij
- Internal security
- Public Security Force (disambiguation)
- Public security (disambiguation)
