= National Intelligence Agency =

National Intelligence Agency may refer to

- Agencia Nacional de Inteligencia, Chile
- National Intelligence Agency (Somaliland)
- National Intelligence Agency (Democratic Republic of the Congo)
- National Intelligence Agency (Nigeria)
- National Intelligence Agency (South Africa)
- National Intelligence Agency, now the State Intelligence Services (The Gambia)
- National Intelligence Agency (Thailand)
- National Investigation Agency (India)

== See also ==
- Defence Intelligence Agency (disambiguation)
- National Security Agency (disambiguation)
- State Security Agency (disambiguation)
- State Intelligence Agency (disambiguation)
- National Bureau of Investigation (disambiguation)
