= NBI =

NBI may refer to:

- NBI (narrow body implant), or Mini dental implant
- Narrow-band imaging, an endoscopic method
- National Balilla Institution, or Opera Nazionale Balilla, an Italian Fascist youth organization
- Nemzeti Bajnokság I
- Nicolas Berggruen Institute
- Niels Bohr Institute
- NBI (bank), a state-run Icelandic bank
- Nation Brands Index
- Nathaniel Branden Institute
- National Bridge Inventory
- The National Broadband Initiative in Ireland
- National Bureau of Investigation (disambiguation)
  - National Bureau of Investigation (Finland)
  - National Bureau of Investigation (Philippines)
  - National Bureau of Investigation (Ukraine)
- Network Bootable Image
- Neutral Beam Injection
- Nile Basin Initiative
- Northbound interface
- NBI Incorporated, an American computer company
