= National Security Bureau =

National Security Bureau or Security Bureau may refer to:

- National Security Bureau (Poland), an agency that executes the tasks given by the president of the Republic of Poland regarding national security
- National Security Bureau (Slovakia), a bureau responsible for protection of confidential data, the introduction and use of the electronic signature and cipher service in the Slovak Republic
- National Security Bureau (Taiwan), the principal intelligence agency of Taiwan
- National Police Agency Security Bureau, a branch of the Japanese National Police Agency
- Security Bureau (Hong Kong), a bureau in Hong Kong responsible for the maintenance of law and order, immigration and customs control, rehabilitating offenders and drug abusers, and providing emergency fire and rescue services
- National Security Bureau of the Arab Socialist Ba'ath Party – Syria Region, a bureau of the Regional Command of the Ba'ath Party in Syria

== See also ==
- National Security (disambiguation)
- National Security Agency (disambiguation)
- National Security Council (disambiguation)
- National Security Service (disambiguation)
- Intelligence Bureau (disambiguation)
