= Naval Intelligence Division =

Naval Intelligence Division or Department of Naval Intelligence may refer to:

- Naval Intelligence Division (United Kingdom), 1912–1964
- Naval Intelligence Division (Israel)
- Naval Intelligence (Pakistan)
- Office of Naval Intelligence, of the United States Navy
- Director of Naval Intelligence, U.S. Navy
- Directorate of Naval Intelligence (India)
- German Naval Intelligence Service

== See also ==
- Defense intelligence (disambiguation)
- Military Intelligence (disambiguation)
