= National Security Agency (disambiguation) =

The National Security Agency is a United States government agency.

National Security Agency may also refer to:

- National Security Agency (Bahrain)
- National Security Agency (Egypt)
- National Security Agency (Liberia)
- National Security Agency (Montenegro)

== See also ==
- National Security (disambiguation)
- National Security Bureau (disambiguation)
- National Security Council (disambiguation)
- National Security Office
- National Security Service (disambiguation)
- State Security Agency (disambiguation)
- State Intelligence Agency (disambiguation)
- National Intelligence Agency (disambiguation)
- Defence Intelligence Agency (disambiguation)
- National Bureau of Investigation (disambiguation)
