= National Bureau of Investigation =

National Bureau of Investigation may refer to the following:

- National Bureau of Investigation (Finland)
- National Bureau of Investigation (Philippines)
- National Bureau of Investigation (Sweden)
- National Bureau of Investigation (Ukraine)
- Central Bureau of Investigation (India)
- Federal Bureau of Investigation (United States)
- Police Bureau of Investigation (Bangladesh)
- Rwanda Investigation Bureau
- Central Investigation Bureau (Nepal)
- Central Bureau of Investigation and Statistics (Republic of China (1912–1949))
  - Ministry of Justice Investigation Bureau (Taiwan)
- Bureau of Investigation and Statistics (Republic of China (1912–1949))
  - Military Intelligence Bureau (Taiwan)
- Criminal Investigation Agency (Indonesia)
- Federal Investigation Agency (Pakistan)
- National Investigation Agency (India)
- Investigation Agency-ICTBD (Bangladesh)

== See also ==
- State bureau of investigation
- Criminal investigation
- NBI (disambiguation)
- Special Investigations Bureau (disambiguation)
- Intelligence Bureau (disambiguation)
- Criminal Investigation Department (disambiguation)
- Accident Investigation Bureau (disambiguation)
- Cambala Investigation Agency, Indian television show
