= Directorate of Military Intelligence =

Directorate of Military Intelligence or Military Intelligence Directorate may refer to:

- Directorate of Military Intelligence (India)
- Directorate of Military Intelligence (Ireland)
- Directorate of Military Intelligence (Nepal)
- Directorate of Military Intelligence (Sri Lanka)
- Directorate of Military Intelligence (United Kingdom)
- Military Intelligence Directorate (Israel)
- Military Intelligence (Pakistan)
- Military Intelligence Directorate (Syria)

== See also ==
- Military Intelligence (disambiguation)
- Intelligence Corps (disambiguation)
- National Intelligence Service (disambiguation)
- National Intelligence and Security Service (disambiguation)
- Foreign Intelligence service (disambiguation)
- State Intelligence Service (disambiguation)
- Federal Intelligence Service (disambiguation)
- General Intelligence Directorate (disambiguation)
- Intelligence Bureau (disambiguation)
