= Security Intelligence Service =

Security Intelligence Service may refer to:

- Canadian Security Intelligence Service
- New Zealand Security Intelligence Service
- Security And Intelligence Services (India), private security company in India
- Tiger Organization Security Intelligence Service, Liberation Tigers of Tamil Eelam (Sri Lankan Civil War)

== See also ==
- Security Service (disambiguation)
- National Security Service (disambiguation)
- National Intelligence and Security Service (disambiguation)
- Secret Intelligence Service, (MI5)
- Signals Intelligence Service, US Army (WWII)
- Special Intelligence Service, forerunner of the CIA
