= National Security Service =

National Security Service could refer to:

- National Security Service (Armenia)
- National Security Service (Kazakhstan)
- National Security Service (Maldives)
- National Security Service (Somalia)
- National Security Service (Turkey)
- National Security Service (United States)
- National Security Service (Uzbekistan)

== See also ==
- National Intelligence and Security Service (disambiguation)
- Security Service (disambiguation)
- Security Intelligence Service (disambiguation)
- National Security (disambiguation)
- National Security Agency (disambiguation)
- National Security Bureau (disambiguation)
- National Security Council (disambiguation)
