= Foreign Intelligence Service =

Foreign Intelligence Service may refer to:

- Foreign Intelligence Service (Armenia)
- Foreign Intelligence Service (Azerbaijan)
- Estonian Foreign Intelligence Service
- Mossad Foreign Intelligence, Israel
- Foreign Intelligence Service (Kazakhstan)
- Foreign Intelligence Service (Romania)
- Foreign Intelligence Service (Russia)
- Foreign Intelligence Service of Ukraine
- Research and Analysis Wing (India)

== See also ==
- National Intelligence Service (disambiguation)
- National Intelligence and Security Service (disambiguation)
- State Intelligence Service (disambiguation)
- Federal Intelligence Service (disambiguation)
- General Intelligence Directorate (disambiguation)
- Directorate of Military Intelligence (disambiguation)
- Intelligence Bureau (disambiguation)
- Main Directorate of Intelligence (disambiguation)
- Ministry of Intelligence (disambiguation)
