= Federal Intelligence Service (disambiguation) =

Federal Intelligence Service may refer to:

- Federal Intelligence Service (Germany) (or Bundesnachrichtendienst; BND) of Germany
- Swiss intelligence agencies

== See also ==
- National Intelligence Service (disambiguation)
- National Intelligence and Security Service (disambiguation)
- Foreign Intelligence service (disambiguation)
- State Intelligence Service (disambiguation)
- General Intelligence Directorate (disambiguation)
- Directorate of Military Intelligence (disambiguation)
- Intelligence Bureau (disambiguation)
