= Public security bureau =

Public security bureau may refer to:

- Public security bureau (China), government office essentially acting as a police station or a local or provincial police

- Beijing Municipal Public Security Bureau

- Tokyo Metropolitan Police Department Public Security Bureau, bureau of the Tokyo Metropolitan Police Department in charge of public security
- North Korean public security bureau, law enforcement in North Korea

== See also ==
- Public security (disambiguation)
- Public Security Force (disambiguation)
