= National security (disambiguation) =

National security is the security of a nation state.

National Security may refer to:

- National Security (2003 film), American film directed by Dennis Dugan
- National Security (2012 film), South Korean film directed by Chung Ji-young

== See also ==
- League of National Security, Australian 1930s far-right group
- National Security Advisor
- National Security Agency (disambiguation)
- National Security Bureau (disambiguation)
- National Security Council (disambiguation)
- National Security Service (disambiguation)
- National defense (disambiguation)
