= Accident Investigation Board =

Accident Investigation Board may refer to:

- Accident Investigation Board Denmark, a government agency of Denmark
- Accident Investigation Board of Finland, a government agency of Finland
- Accident Investigation Board Norway, a government agency of Norway
- Swedish Accident Investigation Board, a government agency of Sweden

== See also ==
- Accident Investigation Bureau (disambiguation)
- Accident Investigation Branch (disambiguation)
