= Defence Intelligence Agency =

Defence Intelligence Agency, or variations of the name, may refer to agencies in several countries, including:

- Defence Intelligence Agency (India)
- Defence Intelligence Agency (Nigeria)
- Defence Intelligence, United Kingdom
- Defense Intelligence Agency, United States
- Defense Intelligence Agency (South Korea)
- Defense Intelligence Headquarters, Japan
- Finnish Defence Intelligence Agency

== See also ==
- Intelligence agency
- List of intelligence agencies (by country)
- Defense intelligence (disambiguation)
- National Intelligence Agency (disambiguation)
- National Security Agency (disambiguation)
- State Security Agency (disambiguation)
- State Intelligence Agency (disambiguation)
