= Committee for State Security =

Committee for State Security may refer to:

- KGB, a.k.a. Committee for State Security (Soviet Union), the secret service of the Soviet Union from 1954 to 1991
- Committee for State Security (Bulgaria), the former secret service of the People's Republic of Bulgaria
- Committee for State Security (Ukraine), the former secret service of the Ukrainian Soviet Socialist Republic
- State Security Committee of the Republic of Belarus
  - Committee for State Security of the Byelorussian Soviet Socialist Republic

== See also ==
- KGB (disambiguation)
- Ministry for State Security (disambiguation)
- State Security (disambiguation)
- State Security Service (disambiguation)
