= National Intelligence Directorate =

National Intelligence Directorate may refer to:

- National Intelligence Directorate (Colombia), a Colombian intelligence agency
- Dirección de Inteligencia Nacional, a defunct Chilean secret police agency

== See also ==
- National Intelligence Service (disambiguation)
