= Main Directorate of Intelligence =

Main Directorate of Intelligence may refer to:

- Main Directorate of Intelligence (Ukraine)
- GRU (Russian Federation)
- GRU (Soviet Union)

== See also ==
- Foreign Intelligence Service (disambiguation)
