= Security increase =

Elevated security measures to reduce risks

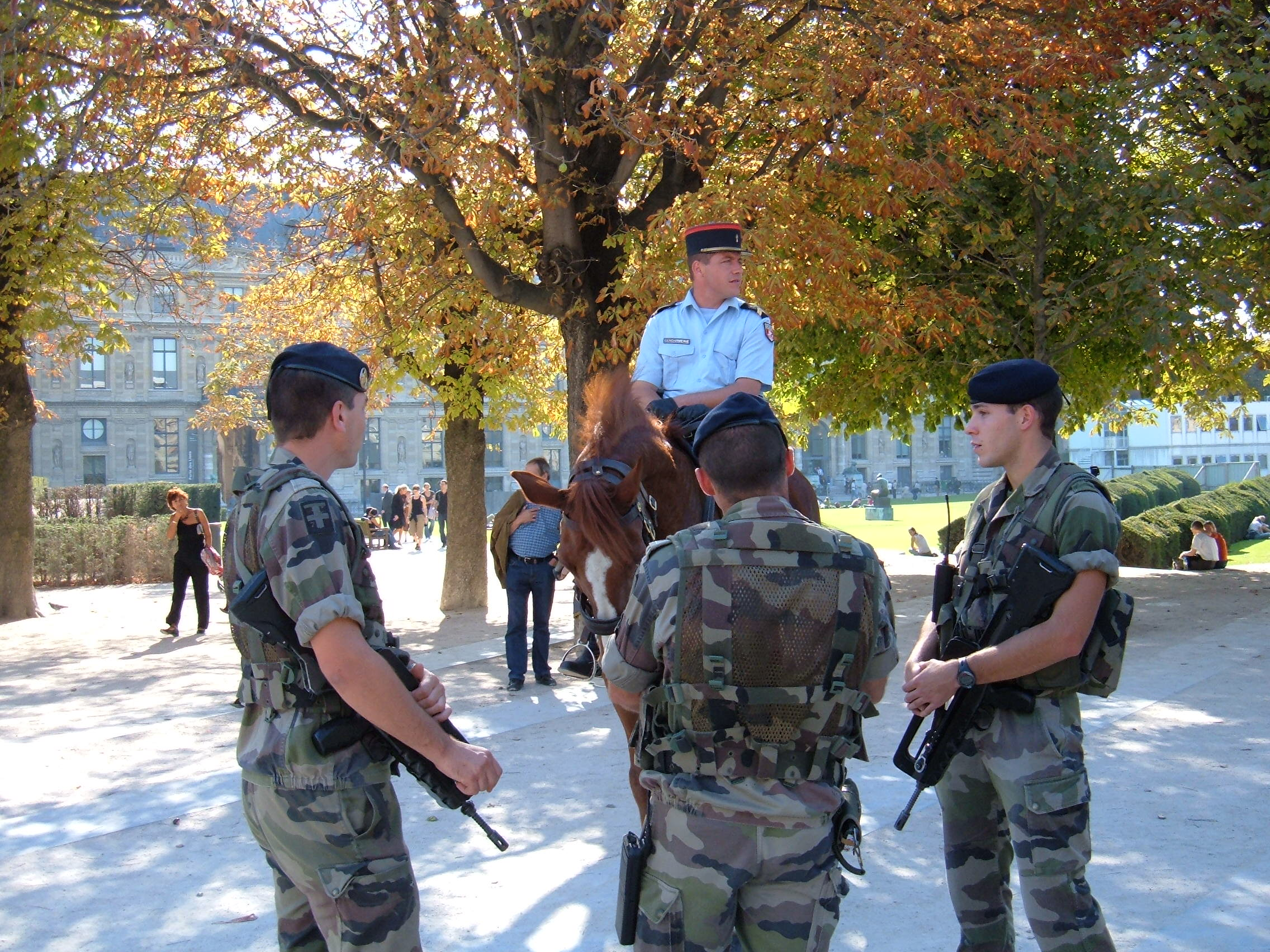
French soldiers stand guard in the Carrousel Garden in Paris during a Vigipirate patrol.

A security increase often occurs when a nation, state, or institution has recently suffered from a serious incident or is under the perception that there is an increased risk for an incident to occur that endangers or potentially endangers its well-being.

Historically, security has been increased by governments and private institutions for a variety or reasons, including incidents that have occurred to themselves, to other similar institutions, or to the world, nation, or region following a high-profile event or a perceived threat of one. When this occurs, many identify the move as elevated, heightened, or "beefed-up" security.

Those who are forced to make changes or be extra-vigilant as a result or the increase sometimes refer to the new era as the "security age."

Institutions which often increase security in response to perceived risks include airports, government buildings, international borders, hospital, schools, religious institutions, and tourist attractions. The September 11 attacks on the World Trade Center in 2001 resulted in security being greatly increased around the world.

Common methods employed to increase security include:

- Increased presence of police officers and/or security guards
- Photo ID checks
- Use of surveillance (human or video)
- Use of certain instruments, like metal detectors or X-ray scanners
- Banning items seen as a potential hazard in a secured area
- Random searches
- Increased enforcement of existing rules and regulations that were previously overlooked
- Background checks
- Warning the public of the perceived threat

== Notable security increases ==
=== Oklahoma City bombing ===
Following the Oklahoma City bombing in 1995, security was increased at high-profile government buildings around the United States. Jersey walls were erected around some buildings to prevent vehicles from coming too close. Pennsylvania Avenue in front of the White House was closed off to traffic.

=== September 11 attacks ===
Following the attacks of September 11, 2001, numerous measures were by the United States and other countries to increase security in many settings. Soon after, the United States launched the Department of Homeland Security.

=== Boston Marathon ===
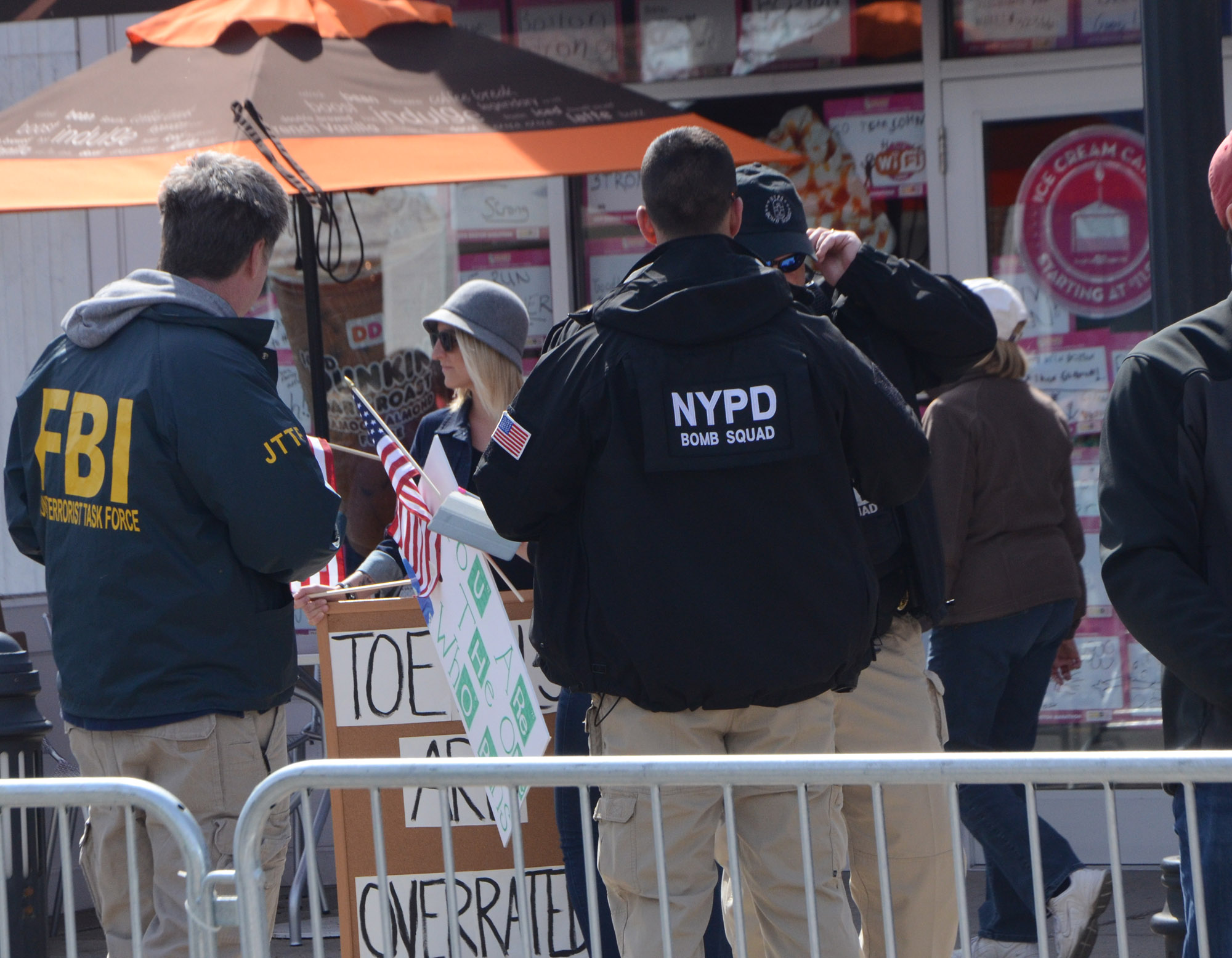
Barriers, FBI joint terrorism taskforce, NYPD officers. Three examples of increased security.

After the Boston Marathon bombing, police vowed to install additional security measures—including bag checks and additional barriers—while maintaining a friendly, happy atmosphere. Police banned backpacks, strollers, suitcases, glass containers, some costumes and props, weight vests, and items larger than 5 by 5 inches (13 cm × 13 cm). More than 3,500 uniformed Boston Police officers were present for security.

=== January 2015 Île-de-France attacks ===
France has deployed soldiers at sensitive sites during French military operations overseas.

The January 2015 Île-de-France attacks led to the deployment of gendarmes and soldiers at major civic centers in France and other European countries. The attacks lead to counter-terror operations in Belgium and other countries. There has generally been an increase in soldiers being deployed around Jewish schools and synagogues in France and Belgium.

Concern around Terrorism in the European Union has risen in the wake of the 2015 Copenhagen shootings.
