= State Security Service =

State Security Service may refer to:

- State Security Service of Abkhazia
- State Security Service (Azerbaijan)
- State Security Service (Belgium)
- State Security Service of East Germany, most commonly known as Stasi
- State Security Service of Georgia
- State Security Service (Kazakhstan)
- State Security Service (Kyrgyzstan)
- State Security Service (Nigeria)
- State Security Service (Uzbekistan)
- Directorate for State Security (Yugoslavia) (1946–1991), the Yugoslav secret police organization
- State Security Directorate (Serbia) (1991–2002), the security agency of the Federal Republic of Yugoslavia

== See also ==
- State Security (disambiguation)
- Committee for State Security (disambiguation)
- Ministry for State Security (disambiguation)
- State Security Agency (disambiguation)
- State Intelligence Service (disambiguation)
- State Intelligence Agency (disambiguation)
