= Intelligence Corps =

Intelligence Corps can refer to:

- Intelligence Corps (United Kingdom)
- Military Intelligence Corps (United States Army)
- Directorate of Military Intelligence (India)
- Directorate of Military Intelligence (Ireland)
- New Zealand Intelligence Corps
- Australian Army Intelligence Corps
- Canadian Intelligence Corps
- Israeli Intelligence Corps

== See also ==
- Directorate of Military Intelligence (disambiguation)
