= Ministry of Intelligence =

Ministry of Intelligence may refer to:

- Ministry of Intelligence (Iran)
- Ministry of Intelligence (Israel)

== See also ==
- Foreign Intelligence Service (disambiguation)
