= Ministry of Internal Security =

Ministry of Internal Security may refer to:

- Ministry of Internal Security (Malaysia)
- Ministry of Internal Security (Rwanda)
- Ministry of Internal Security (Somalia)

== See also ==
- Minister of Internal Security (disambiguation)
- Ministry of Public Security (disambiguation)
- Ministry of National Security (disambiguation)
