= National Intelligence Service =

The National Intelligence Service is the name of several state security agencies:

- National Intelligence Service (Albania)
- National Intelligence Service (Bulgaria)
- National Intelligence Service (Burundi)
- National Intelligence Service (Greece)
- National Intelligence Service (Kenya)
- National Intelligence Service (Peru)
- National Intelligence Service (South Africa)
- National Intelligence Service (South Korea)
- Intelligence Bureau (India)
- Research and Analysis Wing (India)
- Iraqi National Intelligence Service

== Others ==
- Servicio de Inteligencia Naval (Argentina)
- Servicio de Inteligencia del Ejército (Argentina)
- Servicio de Inteligencia de la Fuerza Aérea (Argentina)
- Servicio de Inteligencia Militar (Dominican Republic)

== See also ==
- Intelligence agency
- National Intelligence and Security Service (disambiguation)
- National Intelligence Directorate (disambiguation)
- Foreign Intelligence service (disambiguation)
- State Intelligence Service (disambiguation)
- Federal Intelligence Service (disambiguation)
- General Intelligence Directorate (disambiguation)
- Directorate of Military Intelligence (disambiguation)
- Intelligence Bureau (disambiguation)
