= Accident Investigation Branch =

Accident Investigation Branch or Accidents Investigation Branch may refer to:

- Air Accidents Investigation Branch, a British government agency that investigates aviation accidents, formerly known as the Accidents Investigation Branch
- Marine Accident Investigation Branch, a British government agency that investigates marine accidents
- Rail Accident Investigation Branch, a British government agency that investigates railway accidents

== See also ==
- Accident Investigation Board (disambiguation)
- Accident Investigation Bureau (disambiguation)
