= State Intelligence Agency =

State Intelligence Agency may refer to:

- State Intelligence Agency (Bulgaria)
- State Intelligence Agency (Indonesia)

== See also ==
- Defence Intelligence Agency (disambiguation)
- National Security Agency (disambiguation)
- National Intelligence Agency (disambiguation)
- State Security Agency (disambiguation)
- State Intelligence Service (disambiguation)
- State Security Service (disambiguation)
