= State Intelligence Service =

State Intelligence Service may refer to:

- SHISH (Albania)
- State Intelligence Service (Sri Lanka), formally the National Intelligence Bureau
- State Intelligence Services (The Gambia), formerly National Intelligence Agency (NIA)

== See also ==
- National Intelligence Service (disambiguation)
- National Intelligence and Security Service (disambiguation)
- Foreign Intelligence service (disambiguation)
- Federal Intelligence Service (disambiguation)
- General Intelligence Directorate (disambiguation)
- Directorate of Military Intelligence (disambiguation)
- State Intelligence Agency (disambiguation)
- State Security Service (disambiguation)
- State Security Agency (disambiguation)
- Intelligence Bureau (disambiguation)
