= KGB (disambiguation) =

KGB is a former Soviet security and intelligence agency.

KGB may also refer to:

== Organizations ==
- State Security Committee of the Republic of Belarus (KGB)
  - For others, see Committee for State Security (disambiguation)
- Knowledge Generation Bureau (stylized kgb), a directory assistance and knowledge market company
- Kerala Gramin Bank

== Entertainment and media ==
- KGB (AM), a radio station (760 AM) in San Diego, California, U.S., known as KGB since 2020
- KLSD, a radio station (1360 AM) in San Diego, California, U.S., known as KGB from 1928 to 1982
- KGB-FM, a radio station (101.5 FM) in San Diego, California, U.S.
- KGB (San Francisco), an AM radio station licensed from 1921 to 1922
- KGB (video game)
- KGB, a rock band featuring Ray Kennedy, Ric Grech, and Mike Bloomfield
- "KGB", a character in the movie Rounders
- WKGB-FM, a radio station (92.5 FM) in Binghamton, New York, U.S., branded on-air as KGB
- “KGB”, a song by Adéla, 2026

== Other uses ==
- Andrea Lee (fighter) (born 1989), American mixed martial artist known as KGB
- Kabeer Gbaja-Biamila (born 1977), American football player
- Kerb-guided bus
- Ketchikan Gateway Borough, Alaska
- KGB Archiver, a file archiver and data compression utility
- King George Boulevard, major road in Surrey, British Columbia
- R v B (KG), popularly known as the "KGB Case", a leading Supreme Court of Canada case on hearsay
- Kyle Gass Band, led by Tenacious D guitarist Kyle Gass, US
- Station code for Ketanggungan Barat railway station
