= State Security =

State Security may refer to:

- general concepts of security agency, national security, or secret police

== Active intelligence agencies ==
- State Security Service (Belgium)
- State Security Service (Latvia)
- Lebanese State Security
- State Security Department of Lithuania
- State Security Service (Nigeria)
- Presidency of State Security, Saudi Arabia
- State Security Agency (South Africa)

== Defunct intelligence agencies ==
- State Security (Czechoslovakia)
- Stasi, or Ministry for State Security in the former German Democratic Republic
- State Security Investigations Service, Egypt
- Bureau of State Security, South Africa
- State Security Council, former intelligence coordinating organ in South Africa
- State Security Administration (Yugoslavia)

== Other governmental agencies ==
- State Security Administration (Ukraine)

== See also ==
- Committee for State Security (disambiguation)
- Ministry for State Security (disambiguation)
- State Security Service (disambiguation)
