= State Security Agency =

State Security Agency may refer to:

- State Security Agency of the Republic of Belarus
- State Security Agency (South Africa)

== See also ==
- State Security Service (disambiguation)
- State Intelligence Agency (disambiguation)
- State Intelligence Service (disambiguation)
- National Security Agency (disambiguation)
- National Intelligence Agency (disambiguation)
- Defence Intelligence Agency (disambiguation)
