= Military Intelligence and Security Service =

Military Intelligence and Security Service can refer to

- Military Intelligence and Security Service Sweden, the Swedish external intelligence agency (Militära underrättelse- och säkerhetstjänsten)
- Military Intelligence and Security Service Netherlands, the Dutch Military intelligence agency
- Servizio per le Informazioni e la Sicurezza Militare, the military intelligence agency of Italy

== See also ==
- Military Intelligence (disambiguation)
