= Security Service =

Security Service or security service may refer to:

== Government ==
- Security agency, a nation's institution for intelligence gathering
- List of security agencies (MI5, NSA, KGB, etc.)
- Sicherheitsdienst (SD), Nazi German agency which translates as "Security Service"
- MI5, also called the Security Service, the United Kingdom's counter-intelligence and security agency
- United States Air Force Security Service, a former designation of the US Air Force Intelligence, Surveillance and Reconnaissance Agency
- RCMP Security Service, the Royal Canadian Mounted Police's political intelligence branch
- Swedish Security Service
- Secret service, a government agency concerned with gathering intelligence data
- Secret police, a police agency beyond the law to protect the political power of a dictator or regime

== Other ==
- Security service (telecommunication), security architecture for the interconnection of open systems
- Security and Intelligence Services (India)
- Private security company
- Private military company

== See also ==
- Security Intelligence Service (disambiguation)
- National Security Service (disambiguation)
- National Intelligence and Security Service (disambiguation)
