= Military Intelligence Service (disambiguation) =

The Military Intelligence Service (MIS) was a military unit of the United States during World War II.

Military Intelligence Service may also refer to:

- Military Intelligence Service (Czech Republic)
- Military Intelligence Service (Switzerland)
- Military Intelligence Services, part of the Ministry of Defence of the United Kingdom

== See also ==
- Military Intelligence (disambiguation)
- Military Intelligence Service Language School (MISLS), part of the U.S. Defense Language Institute during World War II
- Military Intelligence Service Memorial Highway, part of California State Route 23 in the United States named in honor of the Military Intelligence Service
