= Minister of Internal Security =

Minister of Internal Security may refer to:

- The head of the Ministry of Public Security (disambiguation) in several countries
- A position in the board game Junta (game)
