= Public Security Force =

Public Security Force is a term which may refer to:

- Jordanian National Police
- Polícia de Segurança Pública the Portuguese National Police
- Public Security Forces the Bahraini principal law enforcement arm of the Ministry of Interior
- National Public Security Force of Brazil

== See also ==
- Public Security Police Force
- Public security (disambiguation)
- Public security bureau (disambiguation)
