= National Intelligence Agency (Somaliland) =

Intelligence agency of Somaliland

- Hay'adda Sirdoonka Qaranka
- Logo of the National Intelligence Agency

Intelligence agency overview
- Formed: 2012
- Jurisdiction: Somaliland
- Headquarters: Hargeisa, Maroodi Jeex
- Employees: Classified
- Annual budget: Classified
- Intelligence agency executive: Jama Mohamoud Egal, Director-General
- Key document: National Intelligence Agency Act No. 59/2012

The National Intelligence Agency (NIA; Somali: Hay'adda Sirdoonka Qaranka) is the intelligence agency of Somaliland. It was established in 2012 under President Ahmed Mohamed Mohamoud (Siilaanyo), with its founding law approved by the Parliament of Somaliland. The agency is headed by a Director-General appointed by the president; the current Director-General is Jama Mohamoud Egal.

== Mandate and organisation ==
The agency operates under the National Intelligence Agency Act (No. 59/2012). Its role is to collect and analyse intelligence in support of national security, and it operates separately from the police. The Director-General sits on Somaliland's National Security Committee, created by the Public Order and Security Act No. 51 of 2012, alongside the president, vice president, the ministers of interior and defence and the chiefs of the army and police.

== Activities ==
In November 2026 the agency announced that it had briefly detained five United States nationals it accused of threatening national security, saying it had monitored them since their arrival and carried out a lengthy investigation into their activities. It did not identify them or give details of the alleged actions.

== Criticism ==
Critics have accused the agency of operating its own detention facilities despite not being a law-enforcement body, arguing that this falls outside the powers given to it by law and threatens human rights.

== See also ==
- Somaliland Armed Forces
- Somaliland Police Force
- Ministry of Defence (Somaliland)
- Politics of Somaliland
