= Defense intelligence (disambiguation) =

Defense intelligence or defence intelligence refers to military intelligence.

Defence Intelligence may also refer to:

- Defence Intelligence, key member of the United Kingdom Intelligence Community
- Defence Intelligence (company), Canadian firm also known as Defintel
- Defence Intelligence Organisation, Australian government agency

== See also ==
- Defence Intelligence Agency (disambiguation)
- Naval Intelligence Division (disambiguation)
