= Accident Investigation Bureau =

Accident Investigation Bureau may refer to:

- Accident Investigation Bureau (Nigeria), a Nigerian government agency
- Aircraft Accident Investigation Bureau (India), an Indian government agency
- Air Accident Investigation Bureau of Singapore, a Singaporean government agency
- Aircraft Accident Investigation Bureau (Switzerland), a former Swiss government agency

== See also ==
- Accident Investigation Board (disambiguation)
- Accident Investigation Branch (disambiguation)
- Aircraft Accident Investigation Bureau (disambiguation)
