= Public security (disambiguation) =

Public security is the prevention of and protection from events that could endanger the safety and security of the public from significant danger, injury, or property damage.

Public security may also refer to:

- Ministry of Public Security (China), a law enforcement agency of People's Republic of China
  - Public security bureau (China), local bureaus
- Public Security (Czechoslovakia), police force of the former Czechoslovak Socialist Republic
- Ministry of Public Security (Poland), secret police in the Polish People's Republic
- Public Security Intelligence Agency, an intelligence agency of Japan
- Public Security Section 9, a fictional intelligence agency and paramilitary force in the Ghost in the Shell anime and manga series

== See also ==
- Public security bureau (disambiguation)
- Public Security Force (disambiguation)
- Ministry of Public Security (disambiguation)
