= Remote guarding =

Remote guarding is a proactive security system combining CCTV video cameras, video analytics, alarms, monitoring centers and security agents. Potential threats are first spotted by cameras and analyzed in real-time by software algorithms based on predefined criteria. Once an event has been identified by the software, a security officer located in a remote center is then alerted to analyze the threat and take appropriate action immediately to prevent or minimize damage from occurring. These actions can include a verbal warning to the perpetrator via two-way radio from the center or reporting the event to local law enforcement.

Remote guarding adds a layer of human verification to automated security systems that results in reducing false alarms to almost 0% by having trained agents review each alert before taking action. This service along with changes to how the alarm industry handles alarms, such as second call verification, continue to reduce the false alarm burden on local law enforcement.

== Compliance with Bureaus & Law Enforcement Agencies ==
Remote guarding is considered by some as the next innovation in traditional man-guarding, which is when licensed security officers are placed on site to observe and report any suspicious activities per The Department of Consumer Affairs (DCA), Bureau of Security and Investigative Services (BSIS), which has jurisdiction over the private security industry. The authority is derived from Division 3, commencing with Section 7580 thru Section 7588.5, Chapter 11.5, Private Security Services Act in the Business and Professions Code (B&P).

Because remote guarding is relatively new to the security industry, organizations and agencies are still working on bringing standards to remote guarding services in respect to previous traditional security mediums.

In October 2016, Underwriter Laboratories (UL) issued the first certificate of compliance for remote guarding through the use of command and control in accordance to the requirements outlined in UL 827B and UL 827 to Elite Interactive Solutions, LLC. of Los Angeles, California. almost 4 years 2 long

== Adaptation of Remote Guarding ==
Traditional security guard companies, as well as a new breed of security companies that focus specifically on Remote Guarding, have emerged to help secure facilities that include property types such as automotive dealerships, multi-family residential housing, office buildings, office parks, warehouses, distribution centers, and many other locations where security is set up to monitor and protect property and people.

However, a new breed of security companies that are exclusively focused on remote guarding have approached the traditional security industry differently by forgoing the inclusion of man-guarding and designing systems and hiring/training agents specifically to solely provide remote guarding services.

While not in direct competition with Remote Guarding Robert H. Perry and Associates reports a trend that Contract Security Companies are starting electronic security divisions or teaming with companies that specialize in electronic security. According to the report, customers are replacing security officers with electronic security, or enhancing security coverage by using security officers and electronic security devices.
