= Ministry for State Security =

Ministry for State Security or Ministry of State Security (often abbreviated to MSS) may refer to:

- Ministry of State Security (China)
- Ministry of State Security (North Korea)
- Ministry for State Security (East Germany), more commonly known as the Stasi
- Ministry of State Security (Soviet Union)
- Ministry of State Security (Transnistria)
- Ministry of Public Security (Poland)

== Similar agencies ==
- Bureau of State Security in Apartheid South Africa
- State Security Committee of the Republic of Belarus
- Committee for State Security in the People's Republic of Bulgaria
- KGB (Committee for State Security) in the Soviet Union
- Sigurimi (Directorate of State Security) in the Socialist People's Republic of Albania
- Main Directorate of State Security in the Soviet Union
- State Security Council in Apartheid South Africa
- Securitate (State Security Department) in Communist Romania
- Directorate for State Security in the Socialist Federal Republic of Yugoslavia, more commonly known as the UDBA
- State Security Investigations Service in Egypt
- National Security Sector in Egypt
- State Security Service (Belgium)
- State Security Service (Nigeria)
- Reich Security Main Office (Nazi Germany)
- Ministry of National Security (Czechoslovakia)

== See also ==
- Interior ministry
- Ministry of Public Security (disambiguation)
- State Security (disambiguation)
- Committee for State Security (disambiguation)
- State Security Service (disambiguation)
