= Ministry of National Security =

The Ministry of National Security can refer to:

- Ministry of National Security of Azerbaijan
- Ministry of National Security (Bahamas)
- Ministry of National Security (Guyana)
- Ministry of National Security (Belize)
- Ministry of National Security (Barbados)
- Ministry of National Security (Czechoslovakia)
- Ministry of National Security (Ghana)
- Ministry of National Security (Grenada)
- Ministry of National Security (Israel)
- Ministry of National Security (Jamaica)
- Ministry of National Security (Saint Kitts & Nevis)
- Ministry of National Security (Saint Vincent & the Grenadines)
- Ministry of National Security (South Sudan)
- Ministry of National Security (Trinidad and Tobago)
- Ministry for National Security (Turkmenistan)
- Ministry of National Security and Labour (Antigua & Barbuda)
- Ministry of National Security, Immigration and Labour (Dominica)
- Ministry of Legal Affairs, Home Affairs and National Security (Saint Lucia)

== See also ==
- Ministry of Public Security (disambiguation)
- Ministry of Internal Security (disambiguation)
