= General Intelligence Directorate =

General Intelligence Directorate may refer to:

- Dirección General de Inteligencia (General Directorate of Intelligence, Cuba)
- General Intelligence Directorate (Egypt)
- General Intelligence Directorate (Jordan)
- General Intelligence Directorate (Saudi Arabia)
- General Intelligence Directorate (Syria)
- General Directorate of Intelligence (Afghanistan)

== See also ==
- National Intelligence Service (disambiguation)
- Foreign Intelligence service (disambiguation)
- State Intelligence Service (disambiguation)
- Federal Intelligence Service (disambiguation)
- Directorate of Military Intelligence (disambiguation)
- Intelligence Bureau (disambiguation)
