= Guardia Urbana =

Guardia Urbana ('Urban Guard') may refer to:

- Guardia Urbana de Buenos Aires, Argentina
- Guàrdia Urbana de Barcelona, Spain
