= National Bureau of Investigation (Ukraine) =

The National Bureau of Investigation (Ukrainian: Національне Бюро Розслідувань України, romanized: Natsional'ne Biuro Rozsliduvan' Ukrayiny) was an organization in Ukraine dedicated to prejudicial investigation on especially dangerous crimes. They are most commonly known in Ukraine as NBR (Ukrainian: НБР) or anglicized as NBI.

== History ==
Its most recent inception was formed in 2005 by President Viktor Yushchenko.

The NBI was succeeded by the SBI in 2016.

== Organization ==
The NBI is formerly subordinated to the General Prosecutor of Ukraine.
