= Ministry of Public Security =

Ministry of Public Security can refer to:

- Ministry of Justice and Public Security (Brazil)
- Ministry of Public Security of Burundi
- Ministry of Public Security (Chile)
- Ministry of Public Security (China)
- Ministry of Public Security of Costa Rica, supervising the Public Force of Costa Rica
- Ministry of Public Security (Israel)
- Ministry of Public Security (Mexico City)
- Ministry of Justice and Security (Netherlands)
- Ministry of Public Security (North Korea)
- Ministry of Public Safety and Security (South Korea)
- Ministry of Public Security of Panama, supervising the Panamanian Public Forces
- Ministry of Public Security (Poland)
- Ministry of Public Security (Quebec)
- Ministry of Public Security (Vietnam)

== Similar agencies ==
- United States Department of Homeland Security

== See also ==
- Interior ministry
- Public security (disambiguation)
- Ministry for State Security (disambiguation)
- Ministry of National Security (disambiguation)
- Ministry of Social Security (disambiguation)
- Ministry of Internal Security (disambiguation)
