= Intelligence Bureau =

Intelligence Bureau may refer to the following:

- Intelligence agency
- Intelligence Bureau (India)
- Intelligence Bureau (Pakistan)
- Intelligence Bureau for the East
- Intelligence Bureau of the Joint Staff Department

== See also ==
- Intelligence agency
- National Intelligence Service (disambiguation)
- National Intelligence and Security Service (disambiguation)
- Foreign Intelligence service (disambiguation)
- State Intelligence Service (disambiguation)
- Federal Intelligence Service (disambiguation)
- General Intelligence Directorate (disambiguation)
- Directorate of Military Intelligence (disambiguation)
