= National Intelligence and Security Service =

National Intelligence and Security Service may also refer to:

- National Intelligence and Security Service (Ethiopia)
- National Intelligence and Security Service (Rwanda)
- National Intelligence and Security Service (Sudan), renamed General Intelligence Service in 2019

== See also ==
- National Intelligence and Security Agency (Somalia)
